= Newcourt =

Newcourt may refer to:

- Richard Newcourt (cartographer) (died 1679)
- Richard Newcourt (historian) (died 1716)
- Newcourt (County Cork) railway station, Ireland
- Newcourt, Exeter, England
- Newcourt (Exeter) railway station, England
- Irishtown, Kilkenny, AKA manor of Newcourt or borough of St Canice's

== See also ==
- New Court (disambiguation)
