= Richard Newcourt =

Richard Newcourt may refer to:

- Richard Newcourt (historian) (died 1716), English notary and historian
- Richard Newcourt (cartographer) (died 1679), English topographical draughtsman and cartographer
