= John Speed =

English cartographer and historian (1551 or 1552 – 1629)

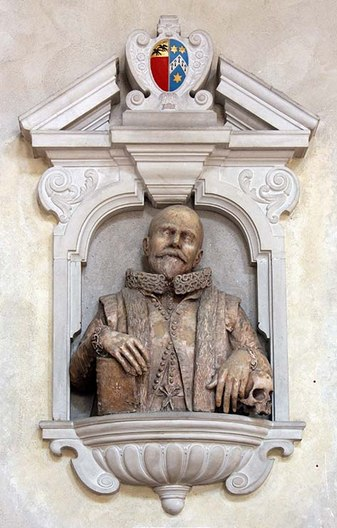
- Memorial to John Speed, St Giles-without-Cripplegate
- Born: 1551 or 1552; Farndon, Cheshire, England
- Died: 1629 (aged 76–77); St Giles-without-Cripplegate, Cripplegate, London, England
- Scientific career
- Fields: Cartography, history

John Speed (1551 or 1552 – 28 July 1629) was an English cartographer, chronologer and historian of Cheshire origins. The son of a citizen and Merchant Taylor in London, he rose from his family occupation to accept the task of drawing together and revising the histories, topographies and maps of the Kingdoms of Great Britain as an exposition of the union of their monarchies in the person of King James I and VI. He accomplished this with remarkable success, with the support and assistance of the leading antiquarian scholars of his generation. He drew upon and improved the shire maps of Christopher Saxton, John Norden and others, being the first to incorporate the hundred-boundaries into them, and he was the surveyor and originator of many of the town or city plans inset within them. His work helped to define early modern concepts of British national identity. His Biblical genealogies were also formally associated with the first edition of the King James Bible. He is among the most famous of English mapmakers.

== Family and early life ==
According to his daughter Sarah Blackmore, John Speed was born in the Cheshire village of Farndon in c. 1551/52. Various families of Speed dwelt in that neighbourhood, but John's relation to them is not precisely established. His father John Speed gained the freedom of the Company of Merchant Taylors of London in April 1556, and is supposed to be the same John Speed who married Elizabeth Cheynye at Christchurch, Newgate Street in the City of London in January 1555/56. From this it is inferred that Speed's birth-mother died during his infancy.

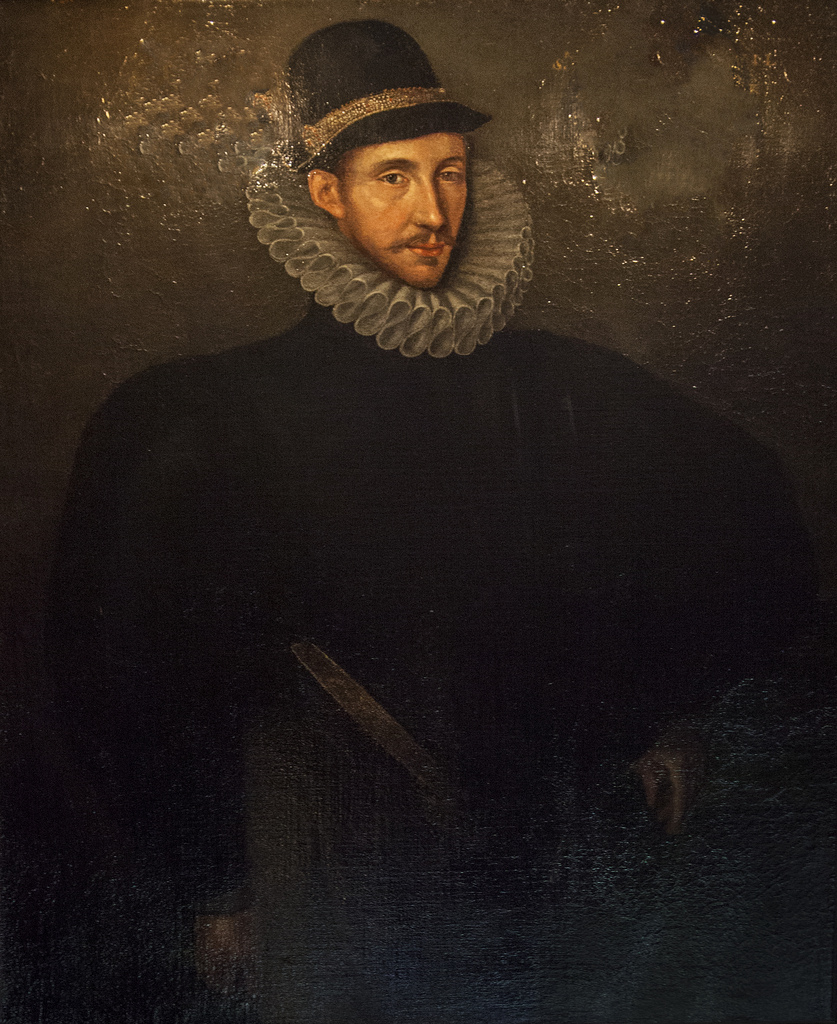
Sir Fulke Greville

By his own account, Speed followed in his father's mercantile business in London, and in 1580 he obtained the freedom of the Merchant Taylors' Company by patrimony. He had married Susanna (born c. 1557/58), daughter of Thomas Draper of London, in 1571 or 1572, and began to raise a family. Most sources state that they had twelve sons and six daughters, of whom the most famous to reach maturity was John Speed, M.D., who studied at Merchant Taylors' School, London and St John's College, Oxford. It appears that the Speed family was fairly well-to-do.

== Patronage ==
Speed came to the attention of learned individuals, among whom was Sir Fulke Greville: Greville, "perceiving how his wide soul was stuffed with too narrow an occupation" (as Thomas Fuller has it), thereafter made him an allowance to enable him to devote his whole attention to research:

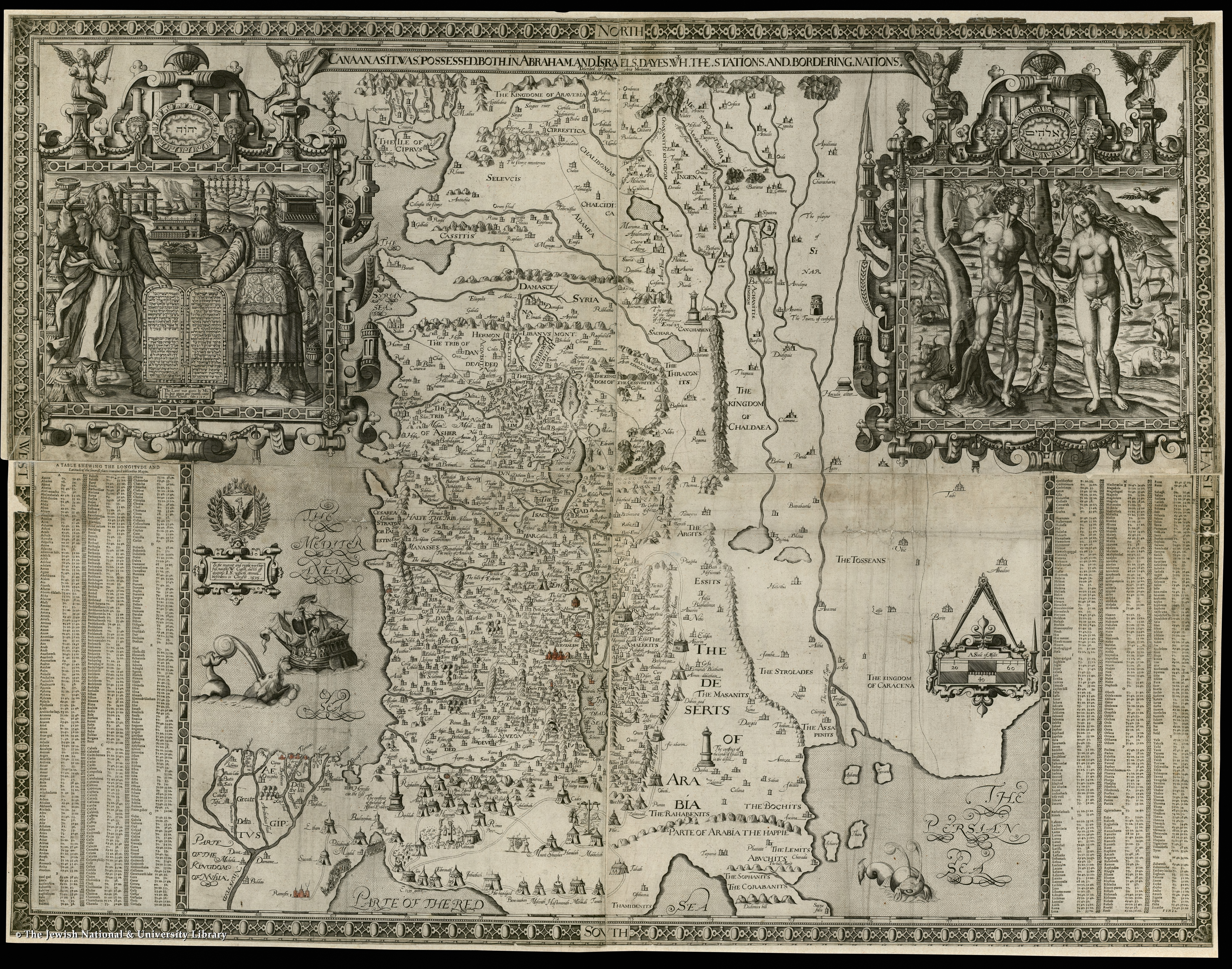
Four-page wall map of Canaan, 1595

[His] merits to me-ward I do acknowledge, in setting this hand free from the daily employments of a manual trade, and giving it his liberty thus to express the inclination of my mind, himself being the procurer of my present estate.

In around 1590 Speed was working with the Puritan scholar Hugh Broughton, and developing their work on the genealogies of Jesus Christ. By 1595 he published a map of biblical Canaan, and in 1598 he presented his maps to Queen Elizabeth. As a reward for these efforts, Elizabeth granted Speed the position of a Waiter (a customs officer):

Mr Fulke Greville has just brought me word of Her Majesty's pleasure that I should write you that there is a waiter's room of the Custom-house fallen in, which she has long determined might be bestowed upon John Speed, who has presented her with divers maps; she therefore desires you will bestow the place upon him, whom she takes to be a very sufficient man to discharge the same.

— William Killigrew to Lord Burghley

He was by then a scholar with a highly developed pictorial faculty. In 1600 he presented three maps of his own making to the Merchant Taylors, who hung them in their Hall or Parlour and made provision for them to be protected by curtains. This gift was remembered in 1601 when Speed sought a lease from the company on a property in Fenchurch Street, a request which failed owing to a higher claim:

he is a man of very rare and ingenious capacitie in drawing and setting forthe of mapps and genealogies and other very excellent inventions... three severall mappes of his own invention, which he freely gave unto this Companie...

In 1598 he contributed a genealogical and heraldic frontispiece to Thomas Speght's edition of the Works of Geffrey Chaucer, reprinted 1602.

=== Career ===
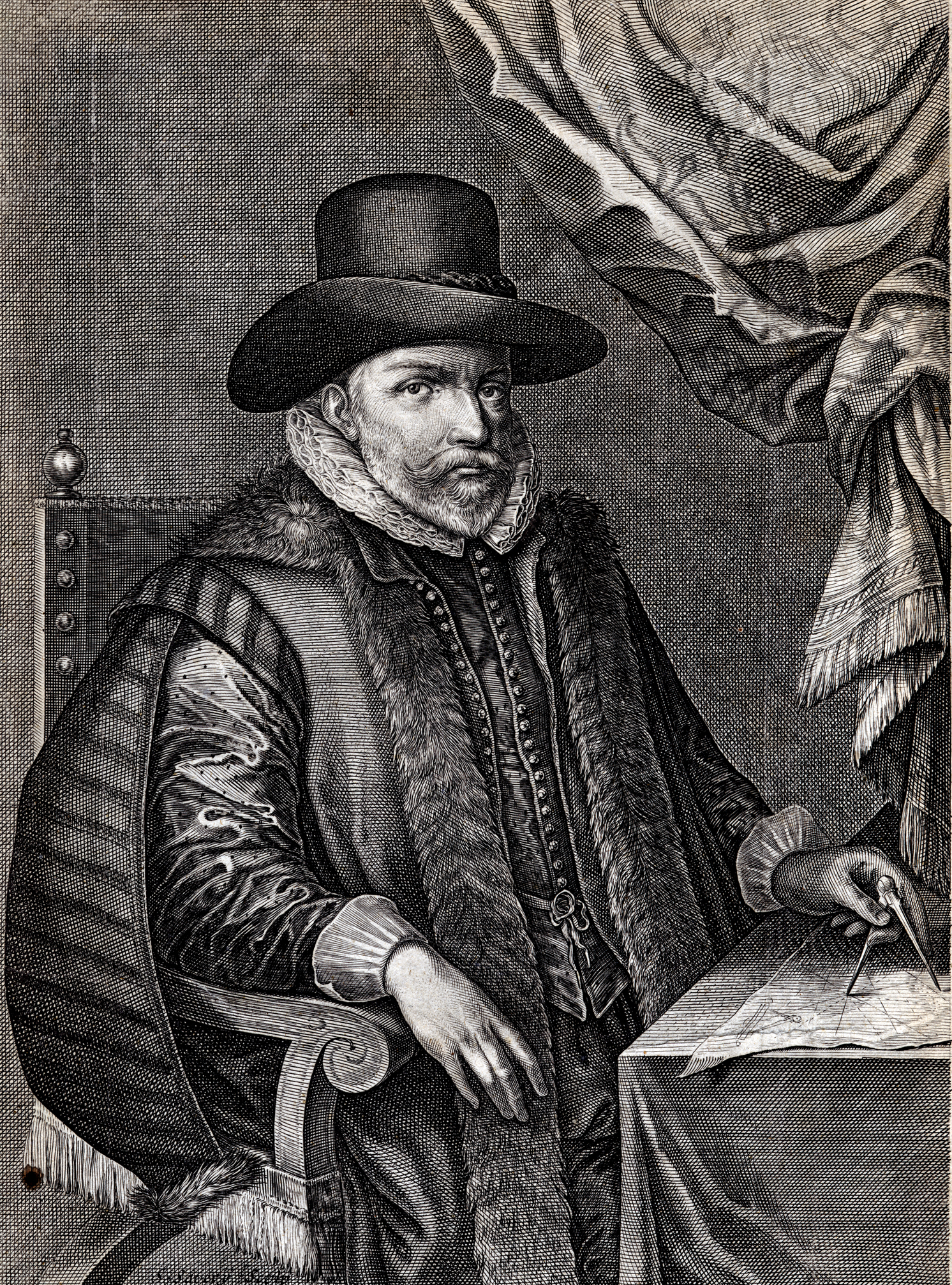
John Speed, by Salomon Savery (1594-1683)

"I shall not fear to commend in the first place, that famous Man John Speed", wrote Degory Wheare in 1637. "He having travell'd over all Great Britain, read diligently all our own Historians, and those of our neighbour Nations, together with a diligent search in the Publick Offices, Rolls, Monuments, and Ancient Writings, or Charters, built up a Splendid and Admired Theatre of the British Empire; which, with great Expedition and Labour, he perfected in XIV. years..." In 1611–1612 the first collated edition of Speed's celebrated atlas and history of Great Britain was published, his son perhaps assisting Speed in preparing surveys of English towns. At the same time, with royal consent, his Sacred Genealogies became incorporated into the first editions of the King James Bible.

In May 1612 Prince Henry asked the Merchant Taylors for his lease on the Company's house in Fenchurch Street to be renewed for Sir Arthur Ingram, as reward for Ingram's good service as Master of the Customs House - which was granted, "to the prejudice" of their brother John Speed. In the 1611 conclusion of his History Speed wrote of "my disease growne dangerous, and life held in suspence." His friend Alexander Gill contributed one of the commendatory verses of the work to Speed, "being very sicke", and wrote that his "...cruell symptomes, and these thirteene yeers assay / For thy deare country, doth thy health & strength decay." (This dates the commencement of the project to about 1598, as Degory Wheare thought.) But it was as a very renowned person that in 1614 Speed negotiated for the Merchant Taylors the renewal of their lease of the gardens and "tayntor" grounds (racks for the drying of dyed cloths) in the prebendary lands at Moorfields, London which the Company held from the Chapter of St. Paul's.

In 1615 Speed requested of the Company the renewal and extension of the lease on a garden and tenement, granted by them in 1594 to George Sotherton, which Speed had since held and upon which he had built "a fayer house", but which he had afterwards surrendered to them with nine years of his tenure still outstanding. A new term of 31 years as from Christmas 1614 was approved. Speed then purchased an adjacent garden and plot of taynter to enlarge his own grounds, and in 1618 (after inspection by the Master and Wardens) obtained the Company's permission to annex it and to enclose it with a wall, together with another new lease. As the lease of the premises was later renewed to his heirs, it appears that this house and grounds remained John Speed's residence until his death.

During the same period Speed greatly enlarged his work on the sacred chronologies and genealogies, as A Clowde of Witnesses (1616, 2nd 1620): and after re-issue in various forms, his History and Theatre were newly presented as a Second, revised Edition, in 1623. In his last years, Speed was working on further revisions and adaptations of his atlas in other formats, and on the materials for his world atlas, which took shape as his Prospect of the Most Famous Parts of the World in 1627. He continued to maintain his annals, though by April 1626 he had become blind and suffered from the stone.

=== Death ===
John Speed died in July 1629 at the age of 77 or 78. He was buried alongside his wife (who had died in the previous year) in London's St Giles-without-Cripplegate church on Fore Street. According to Fuller, his funeral sermon was delivered by Josias Shute. A monument to John Speed was soon afterwards erected on the south side of the chancel of the church. (See Monument and epitaph below.)

== Works ==
=== Biblical genealogies ===
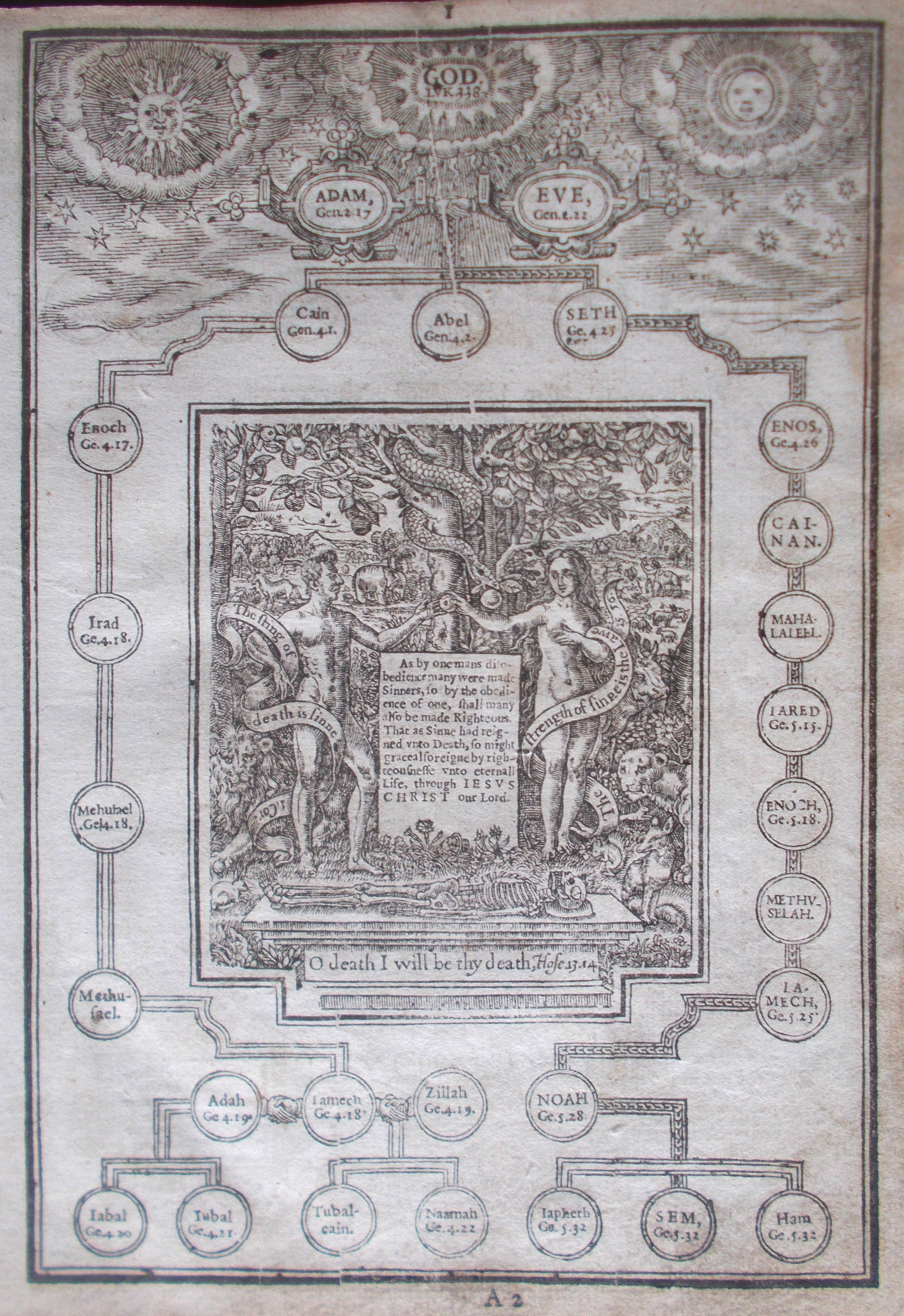
Opening of the Genealogies, 1611

The Puritan clergyman scholar Hugh Broughton developed his study of Old Testament chronology and concordance in his work A Concent of Scripture in editions of 1588/89 and 1590, with illustrations said to be engraved by Jodocus Hondius. John Speed, "by acquaintance with Mr. Broughton, [had] grown very studious in the scriptures" (wrote John Lightfoot), "and by his directions grown very Skilfull in them". Owing to the censure of puritan doctrines, Broughton recruited John Speed to see the work through the press, and from this collaboration arose the abstract of sacred genealogies first issued in Speed's name in 1592. In around 1595 the two men brought out an index to that work. To that period belongs Speed's first Map of Canaan (after Montanus) in four sheets.

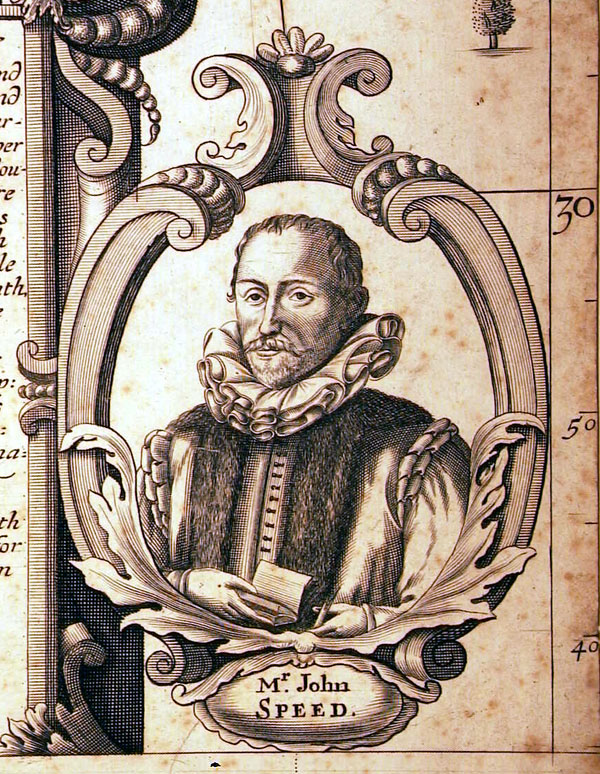
Speed's portrait, from the version of More's Map of Canaan re-engraved after 1666

In October 1610 Speed was granted a royal patent by King James to publish his genealogical work. In 1611, as The Genealogies recorded in the Sacred Scriptures according to euery family and tribe with the line of Our Sauior Jesus Christ obserued from Adam to the Blessed Virgin Mary, it was incorporated into the first edition of the King James Bible. For many years, this work (which had its own title-page) was bound into all copies of the Authorised Version, and it was reprinted for that purpose many times during the 17th century. It contained some now-famous illustrations, including an image of Adam and Eve taking fruit from the forbidden tree in the Garden of Eden, and a tree of the nations of the world arising out of Noah's Ark. The royal patent enabled Speed to have the profit of it in reward for his various great labours. Speed is said to have admitted, for this reason, that "Mr Broughton was a means under God of great Blessings to him, and his Children, for worldly comforts": he also reputedly confessed to having burned a great quantity of Broughton's manuscripts.

This work was not merely an ornamental adjunct to the Bible, but had the serious intellectual purpose of expounding a resolution (or at least an explanation) of the differing descents of Jesus Christ from King David as they are recited in the Gospels of St Matthew and St Luke. His continuation and finishing of the Map of Canaan originated by a Puritan scholar, the Norwich minister and chronologer John More (who died in 1592), appeared with the date 1611 in the King James Version but the version of this map, which includes portraits of More and Speed, was engraved after the Great Fire of London (1666), in which the original plates were destroyed (according to a text within the later map).

In 1616 Speed developed the genealogies into a longer work, A Cloud of Witnesses confirming the Humanity of Christ Ihesus, with lengthy textual explanations, in twelve chapters, for the descents shown in his diagrams or family trees. The first issue was printed by John Beale for Daniel Speed: (Daniel was presumably the stationer who had licence to marry Matilda Garrett in February 1617/18). Beale printed a second edition in 1620, with a dedication to George Abbot, Archbishop of Canterbury 1611-1633, and a third appeared in 1628 printed by Felix Kyngston for Edward Blackmore, Speed's son-in-law. Speed's distinctive style of genealogical diagram, with the names contained in circular bubbles linked in chains, later appeared in the royal genealogies in the 1623 edition of the History.

=== History and Theatre ===
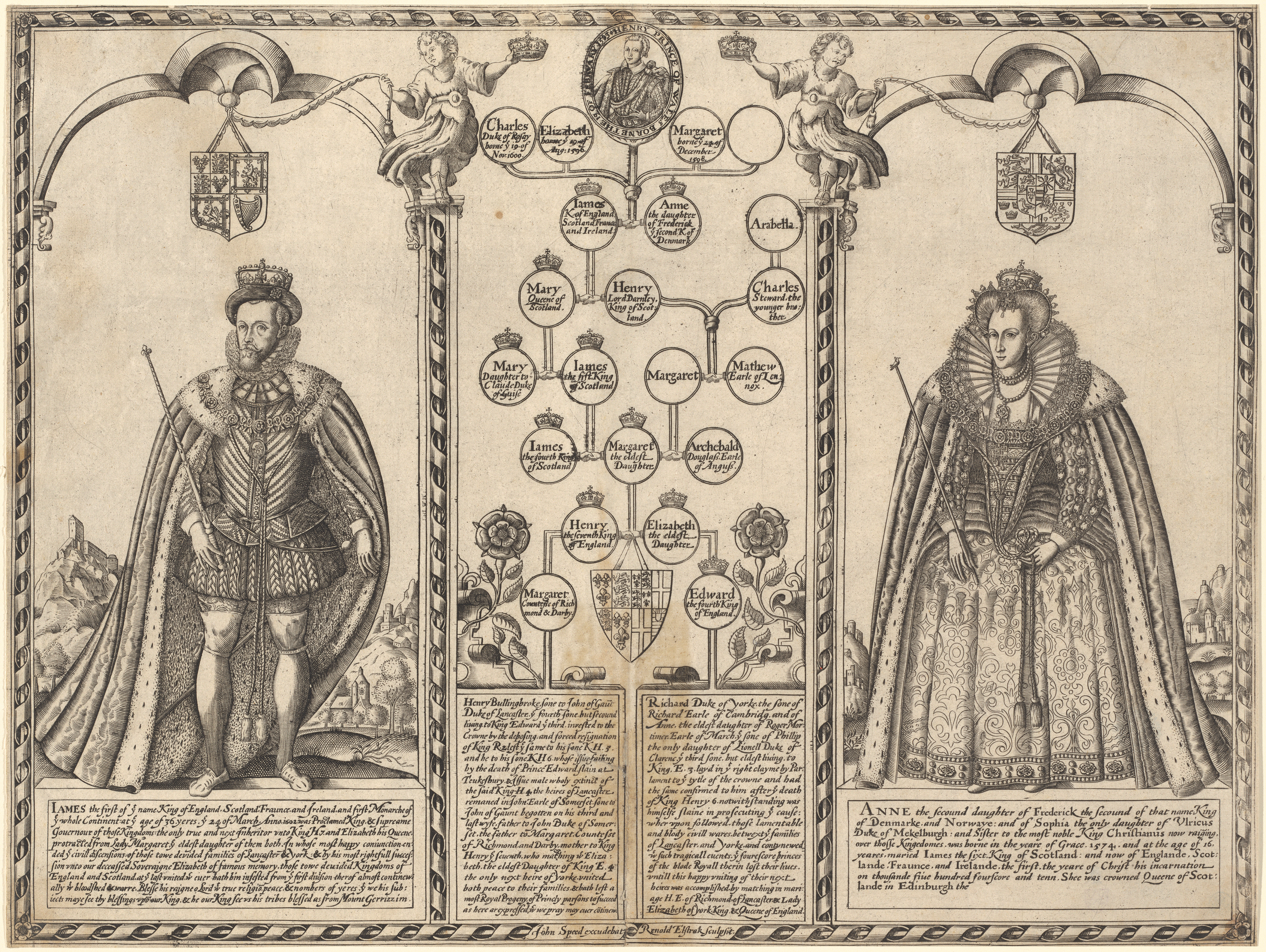
Dynastic representation of King James printed by John Speed, by 1612. The tree ascends to Henry, Prince of Wales.

John Speed's fame today rests, in popular estimation, upon his work as map-maker, but this should not be held separate from his important contributions as a historian, chronologer, and scriptural genealogist. Many of his publications reached their definitive form in 1611. The succession of King James VI of Scotland to the crown of England and Wales, and to that of Ireland, upon the death of Queen Elizabeth in 1603, brought the Tudor dynasty to a close and inaugurated the House of Stuart monarchy of Great Britain. Speed's historical researches under the patronage of Fulke Greville were stimulated or assisted by William Camden (Clarenceux King of Arms), Sir Robert Cotton, Sir Henry Spelman, John Barkham, William Smith (Rouge Dragon Pursuivant) and others, who during the 1580s together formed the Elizabethan College of Antiquaries, predecessor of the London Society of Antiquaries. Their interests were rooted in early-medieval English antiquities. But (after the abolition of that college by James I in 1607) Speed's work came together, Cum Privilegio, as an instrument of the unification of British kingship in the person of King James, much as the "Authorized Version" of the English Bible to which Speed contributed his sacred genealogies. This English Bible was promulgated in the same year of 1611.

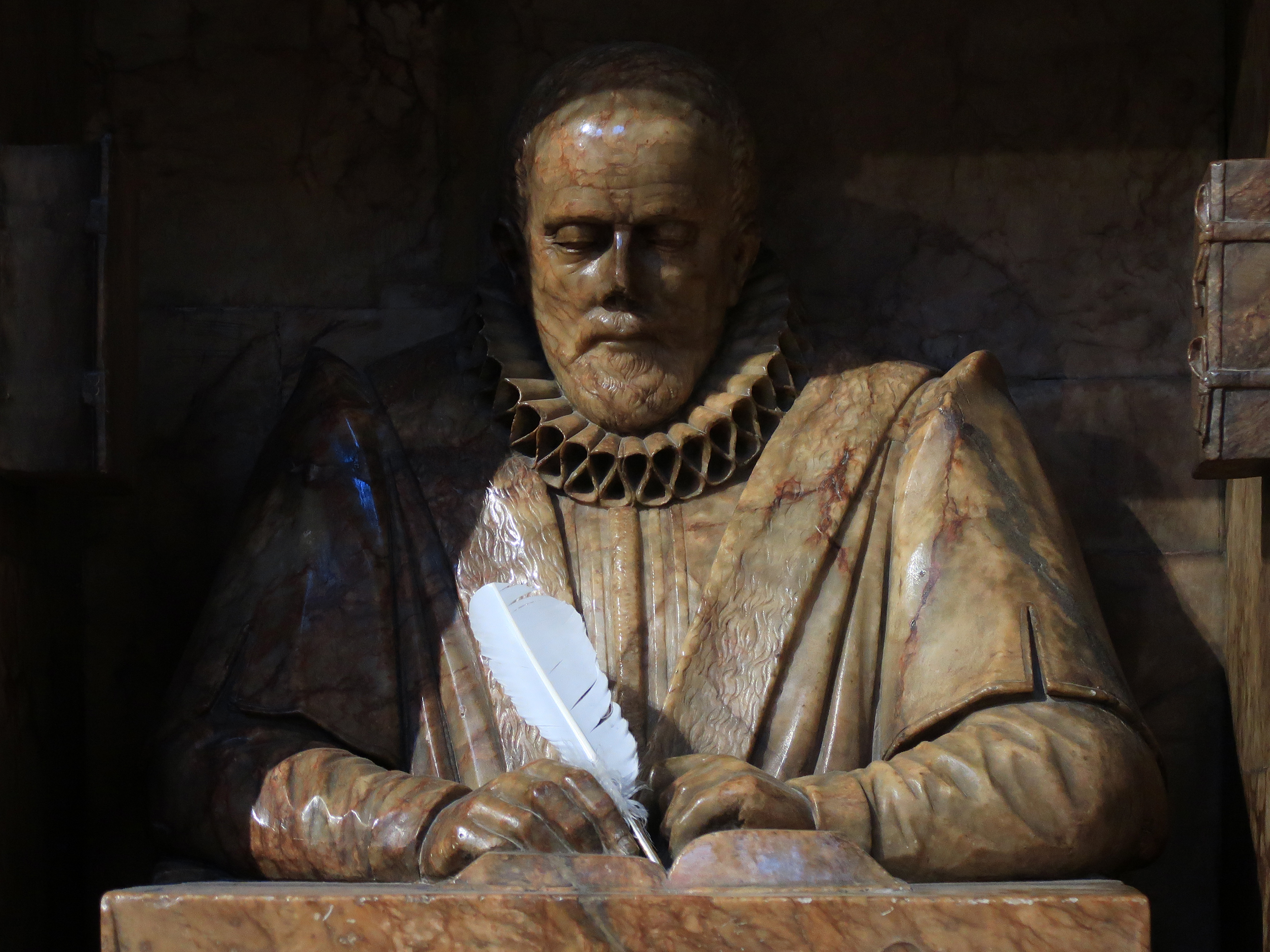
John Stow, Chronicler and Topographer

The chronicler John Stow (died 1605, also a Merchant Taylor), Speed's elder contemporary, from 1562 sought to disentangle the confused order of the English Chronicles, finding much fault in "the ignorant handling of ancient affairs" by Richard Grafton: Stow's Summarie of Englyshe Chronicles (and its abridgement) of 1566/67, several times republished, his Chronicles of England from Brute unto this present yeare of Christ, 1580, and his The Annales of England (1592, 1601, 1605), which itself lists a very wide range of sources, were the immediate predecessors to Speed's History, from the historical aspect, as Camden's Britannia in the 1607 edition (with county maps) was his chorographical precedent. Stow announced a (much larger) forthcoming history of Britain, A Historie of this Iland, in 1592, but it never reached publication. Editions of Florence of Worcester, the Flores Historiarum, and of William of Malmesbury, Henry of Huntingdon and others in Sir Henry Savile's Rerum Anglicarum Scriptores post Bedam came into print in the same period. The standard available edition of Bede's Historia Ecclesiastica (a primary text for the early medieval history of England) was in volume III of the Hervagius (Johannes Herwagen) 1563 Opera Bedae Venerabilis.

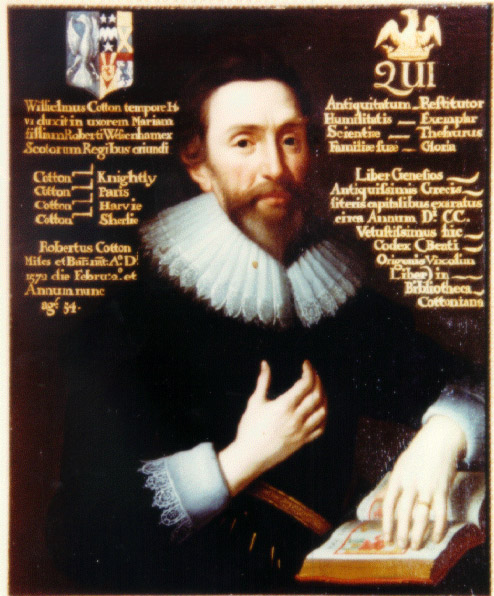
Sir Robert Cotton

Speed naturally drew extensively on the work of his predecessors, including Christopher Saxton and John Norden as cartographers, William Camden as chorographer (Britannia 1586), and upon Stow and other late chroniclers, in so vast an undertaking (for which Speed considered his own powers quite insufficient), while at the same time revising, improving, verifying and subjecting to scholarly scrutiny all that he could, and where possible obtaining new expert contributions. Some letters survive from Speed to Sir Robert Cotton, written in the years before publication, asking for assistance in gathering necessary materials. Speed acknowledged gratefully that Sir Robert's cabinets were unlocked and his library set open, to supply the "chiefest garnishments" of this work, such as antique altars and trophies, and ancient coins, seals and medals: that the books and collections of John Barkham were similarly brought to his assistance; and that William Smith, Rouge Dragon, had particularly helped in matters of heraldry.

From the first page of the Histories a fresh approach is afoot. Speed dispenses with the full list of pseudo-historic rulers stemming from Brutus the supposed founder of Britain, drawn from Geoffrey of Monmouth's History of the Kings of Britain and repeated by Stow, and instead touches upon the Trojan theory in his discussion of the Name of Britain. Coming into the Saxon narrative, marginal references identify the sources of information from Gildas (De Excidio Britanniae), Bede, Widukind of Corvey and many others, presenting an erudite voice and a discursive historical method, while preserving the structure and chronology relating to the seven kingdoms, and illustrating coins and other materials in true antiquarian fashion. James Spedding, noting the limitations in Speed's account of Henry VII, allowed that his Historie "was enriched with some valuable records and digested with a more discriminating judgement than had been brought to the task before."

=== History of Great Britaine ===
In the first edition of his History of Great Britaine (1611), following the "Proem", the historical text begins as page 155 of the whole work, to which the maps of that edition are counted as occupying the preceding page-numbers, and presented separately as The Theatre of the Empire of Great Britain. "This collection makes a noble apparatus to his history", observed Richard Gough, who noted that these were the first maps in which all the counties are divided into hundreds, and that those which Speed derived from Saxton's maps were mostly so corrected or amended as to supersede any attribution to Saxton. The County descriptions printed on the reverse of the maps were mainly adapted from those of William Camden. Speed's magnum opus is from this point a twin Chorographical and Historical work. In the issue of 1614 and the second, revised and augmented edition (of 1623) the whole work is introduced as being in ten Chapters, of which the first four (the "Chorographicall Part") are the maps, arranged as:

- (1) Describing the whole Kingdome in generall, with those Shires, Cities, and Shire-townes which are properly accounted for English
- (2) Containing the Counties of Wales (13)
- (3) Scotlands Kingdom in one Generall (1)
- (4) Containing the Kingdome of Ireland – a general plan, and maps of Munster, Leinster, Connaught and Ulster (5)

The work then proceeds to the "Historicall Part", Books 5-10, arranged as follows:

- (5) The Site, Names, Ancient Inhabitants, Manners, Government, Governors, Costume and Appearance of Great Britain and the Ancient British.
- (6) The Monarchs of Great Britain under the Romans (54 sections).
- (7) The Saxon Kings and English Monarchs, from the downfall of Britain and the origins and arrival of the Saxons, through the Heptarchy, from Hengest (sect. 13) to Edmund Ironside (sect. 45).
- (8) The Danish rulers, with their origins and first assaults, and in detail from Cnut to Harold II (7 sections).
- (9) The Norman rulers and their origins, continued from William I to the end of Elizabeth I (24 sections).
- (10) "James, our dread Soueraigne".

The many coins, seals and other antiquities illustrated in Speed's text were cut by the Swiss wood-engraver Christoph Schweitzer. An important feature of the History is Speed's "Catalogue of the Religious Houses, Colledges, and Hospitals Sometimes in England and Wales", appended to the reign of Henry VIII, said to have been compiled by the elder William Burton. The list was published in Latin in 1622 as "Catalogus ex Anglico Ioannis Speed, Latinus", as appendix to Nicholas Harpsfield's Historia Anglicana Ecclesiastica.

=== The Theatre of the Empire of Great Britaine ===
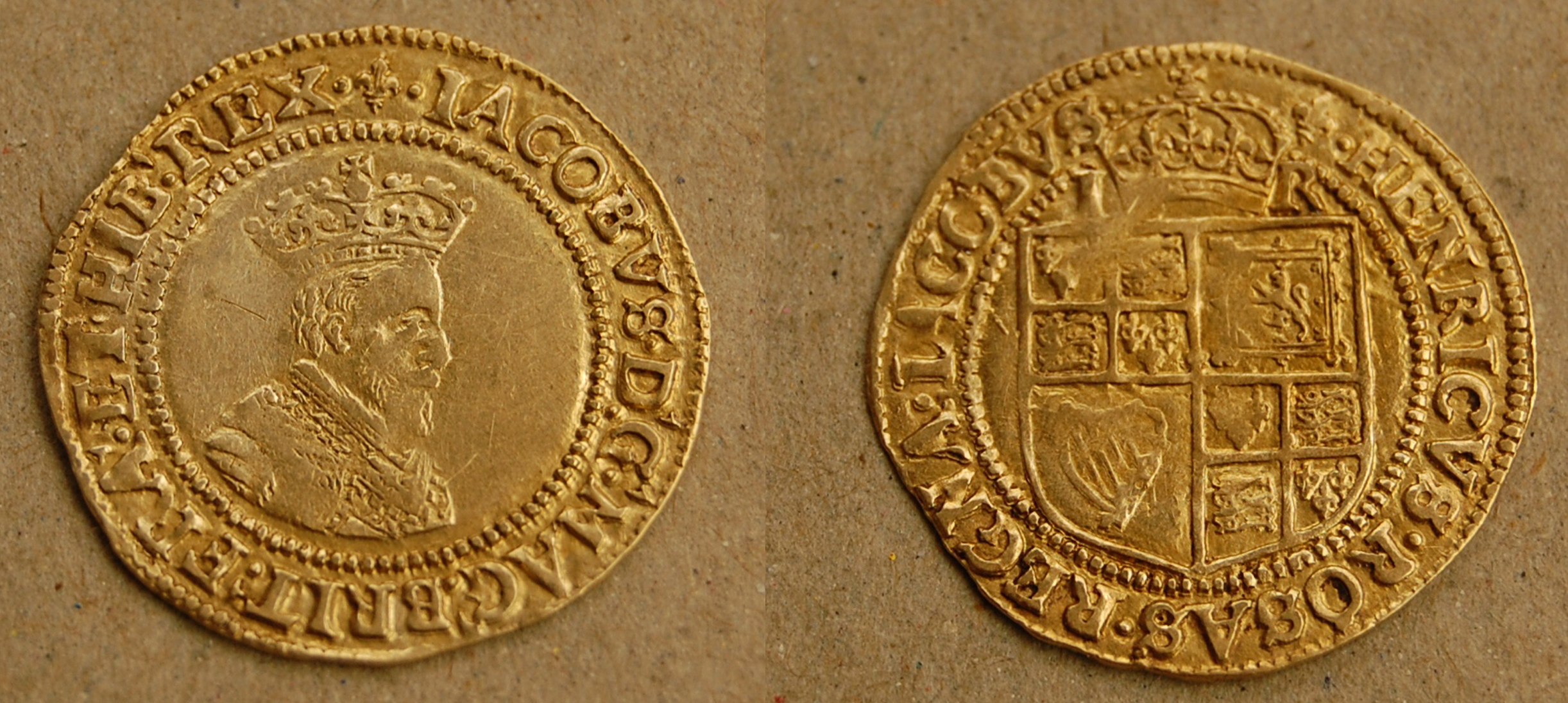
Gold crown of King James, exemplifying the Union of the crowns

Speed is now best-known as a map-maker, and above all for his atlas, The Theatre of the Empire of Great Britaine (1611, 1616, 1623), which attempted a complete set of individual county maps of England and Wales, as well as maps of Ireland and a general map of Scotland. A 21-year royal privilege (franchise) for the printing of Speed's Theatre was granted to George Humble in April 1608. The collection developed cumulatively, together with his History, and was undertaken with the encouragement of William Camden. The entire work, including the History, was dedicated to King James I as the ruler in whom the distinct Kingdoms of the British Isles had been brought together under one rule in such a way as to form an Empire.

In the Introduction to his "well affected and favourable reader", Speed acknowledged that he had "copied, adapted and compiled the work of others" rather than making an entirely new survey. He took various existing maps as his models, crediting five to Christopher Saxton, five to John Horden, two to William Smith, one to Philip Symonson (Kent) and others to John Harrington (Rutland), William White, Thomas Durham, James Burrell, and Geradus Mercator. Much of the engraving was done in Amsterdam at the workshop of the Flemish engraver Jodocus Hondius, to whom Speed's project was recommended by Camden, and with whom Speed collaborated from 1606 until Hondius's sudden death in 1612. The maps were printed by William Hall and John Beale, and sold by John Sudbury and George Humble.

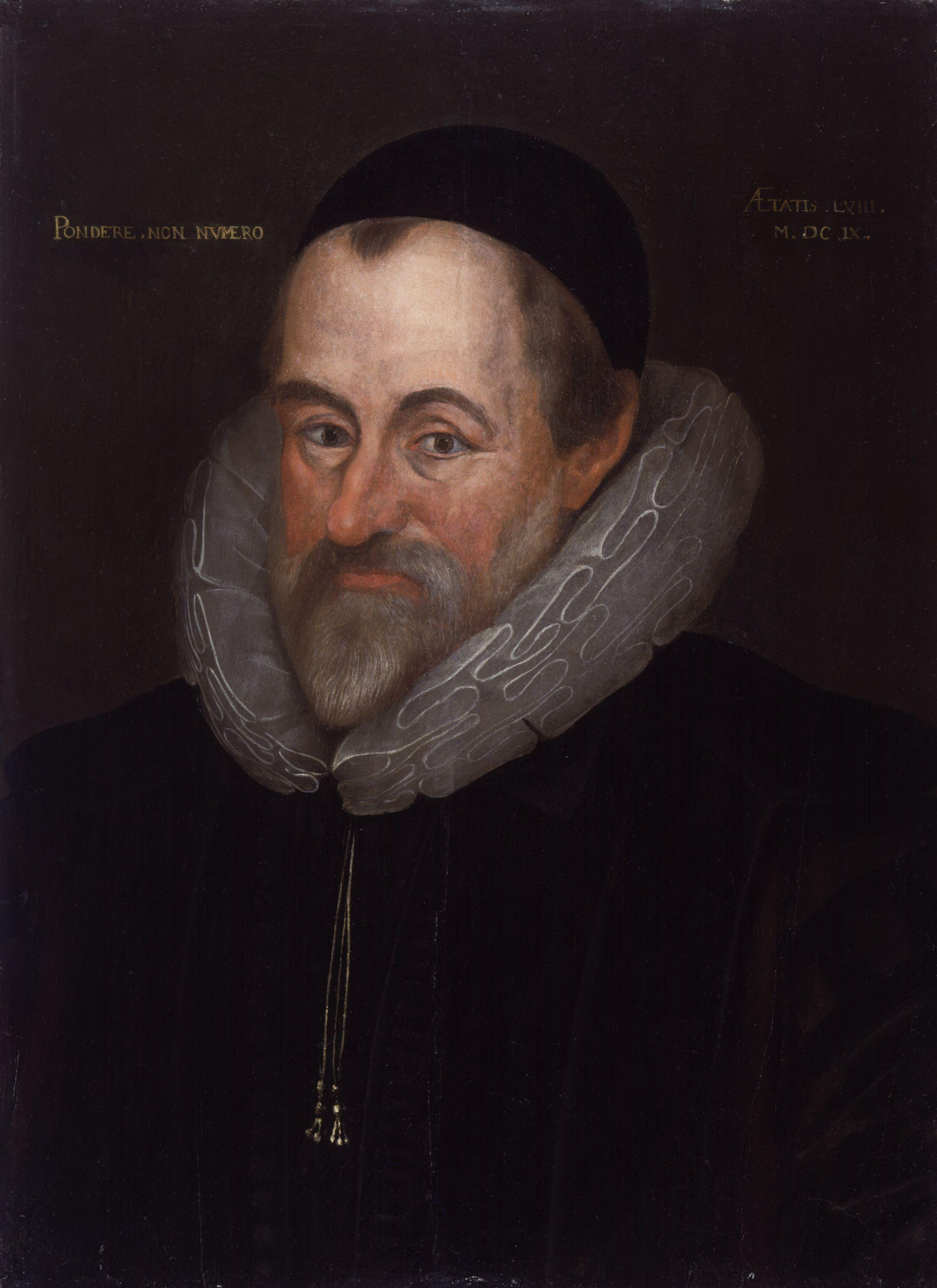
William Camden, Clarenceux

Speed is admired also for his detailed plans of principal British towns, several of which are the earliest-known depictions of those places and provide valuable topographical insights. Most, but not all, of the county maps have town plans inset; those showing a Scale of Passes (i.e., Paces, reckoned at five feet imperial) were surveyed by Speed himself. On the back of the maps a text in English appears, describing the areas shown: a rare 1616 edition of the British maps has the text in Latin, in a translation by Philemon Holland, thought to have been produced for the Continental market. His maps of English and Welsh counties were often bordered with costumed figures ranging from nobility to country folk. Speed drew historical maps as well as those depicting present times, showing (for instance) invasions of England and Ireland, or the Anglo-Saxon Heptarchy, a subject previously attempted (probably by Laurence Nowell) for William Lambarde's Archaionomia published in 1568.

The "Gardner copies" in the Cambridge University Library are a collection of proof impressions from the engraved copper plates, taken during the process of checking the detail before the publication of 1611. In describing his intentions Speed admitted the possibility of errors despite his best endeavours:

my purpose... in this Island (besides other things) is to shew the situation of every Citie and Shire-town only... The Shires divisions into Lathes, Hundreds, Wapentakes and Cantreds, according to their ratable and accustomed manner, I have separated, and under the same title that the record beareth, in their due places distinguished: wherein by help of the tables annexed, any Citie, Towne, Borough, Hamlet, or Place of Note may readily be found, and whereby safely may be affirmed, that there is not any one Kingdome in the World so exactly described, as is this our Island of Great Britaine... In shewing these things, I have chiefly sought to give satisfaction to all, without offence to any...

The maps, in two-folio spreads, represented: Fol. 1, The British Isles; 3, England (General); 5, The Saxon Heptarchy; 7, Kent; 9, Sussex; 11, Surrey; 13, Hampshire; 15, Isle of Wight; 17, Dorset; 19, Devon; 21 [73], Cornwall; 23, Somerset; 25, Wiltshire; 27, Berkshire; 29, Middlesex; 31, Essex; 33, Suffolk; 35, Norfolk; 37, Cambridgeshire; 39, Hertfordshire; 41, Bedfordshire; 43, Buckinghamshire; 45, Oxfordshire; 47, Gloucestershire; 49, Herefordshire; 51, Worcestershire; 53, Warwickshire; 55, Northamptonshire; 57, Huntingdon; 59, Rutland; 61, Leicestershire; 63, Lincolnshire; 65, Nottinghamshire; [67], Derbyshire; 69, Staffordshire; 71, Shropshire; 73 [21], Cheshire; 75, Lancashire; 77, Yorkshire; 79, West Riding; 81, North and East Ridings; 83, Durham-Bishopric; 85, Westmorland; 87, Cumberland; 89, Northumberland; [91], Isle of Man; 93, Islands (Holy Island, the Farne Islands, the Channel Islands). 99, Wales (General); 101, Pembrokeshire; 103, Carmarthenshire; 105, Glamorganshire; 109, Radnorshire; 111, Cardiganshire; 113, Montgomeryshire; 115, Merionethshire; 117, Denbighshire; 119, Flintshire; 121, Carnarvonshire; 123, Anglesey. 131, Scotland (General). 137, Ireland (General); 139, Munster; 141, Leinster; 143, Connaught; 145, Ulster. In 2016, the British Library reprinted this collection of maps of the British Isles with an introduction by Nigel Nicolson and commentaries by Alasdair Hawkyard.

=== Counties (examples) ===
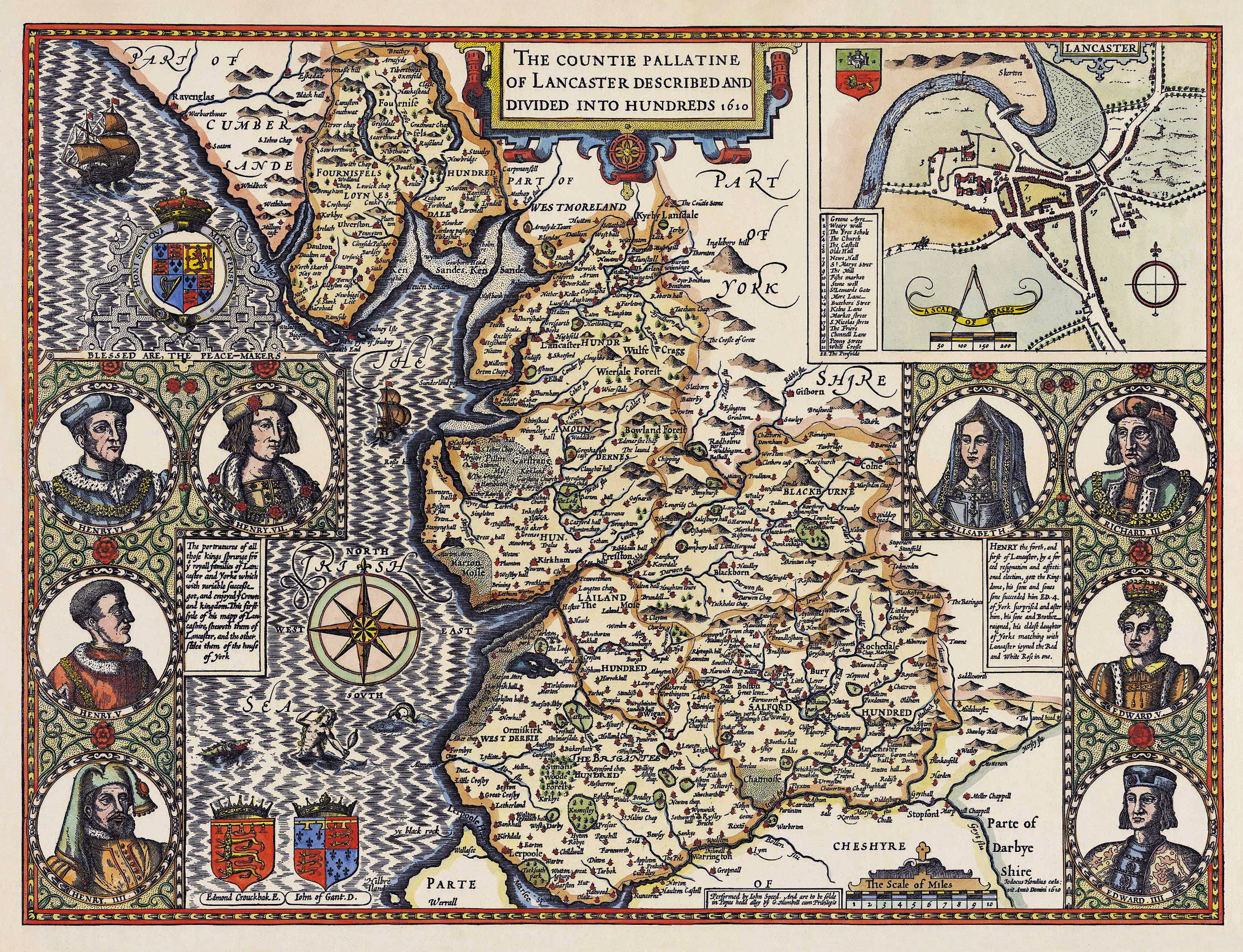
The Countie Pallatine of Lancaster described and divided into hundreds, 1610

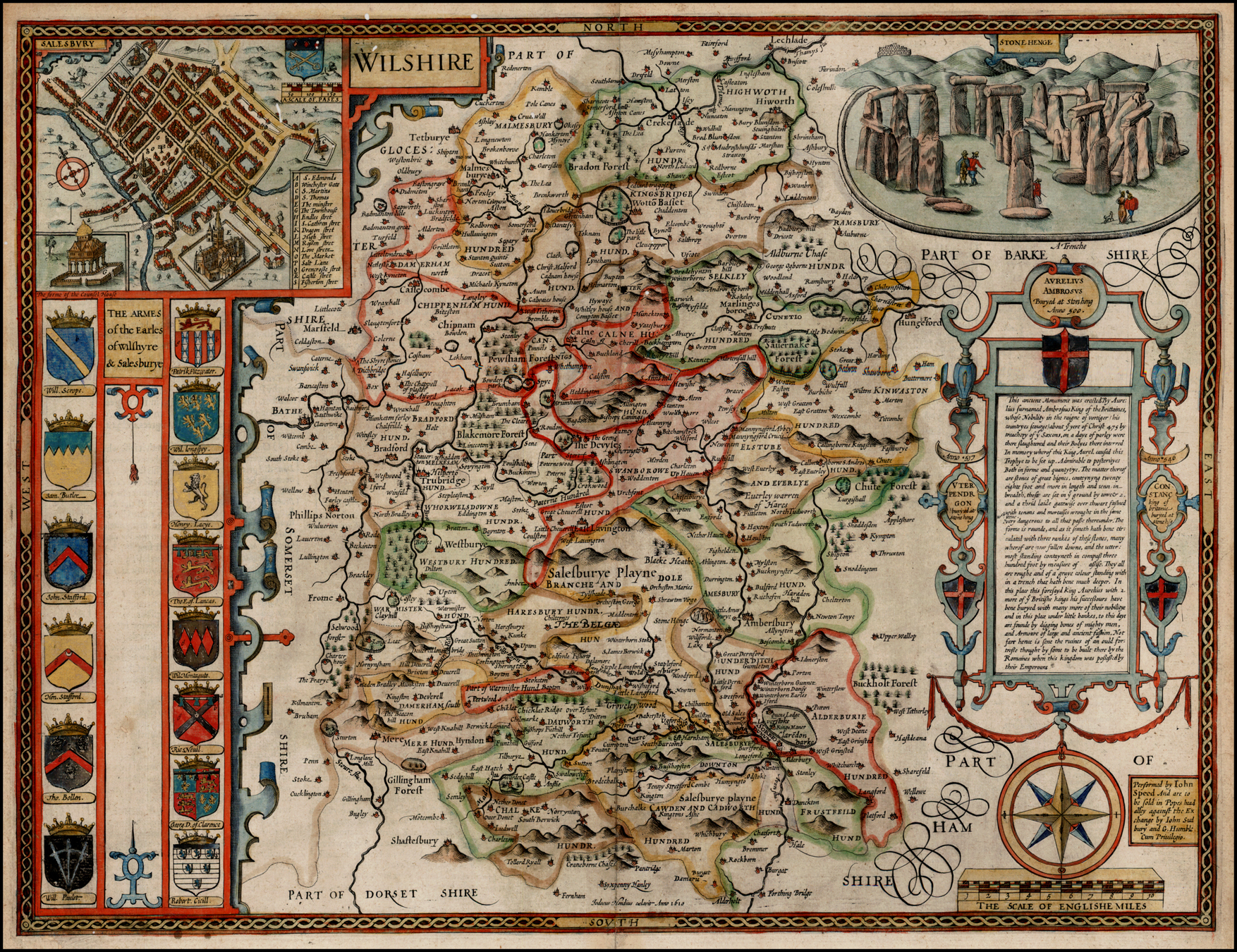
Wilshire, 1610, with a town plan of Salisbury and a view of Stonehenge

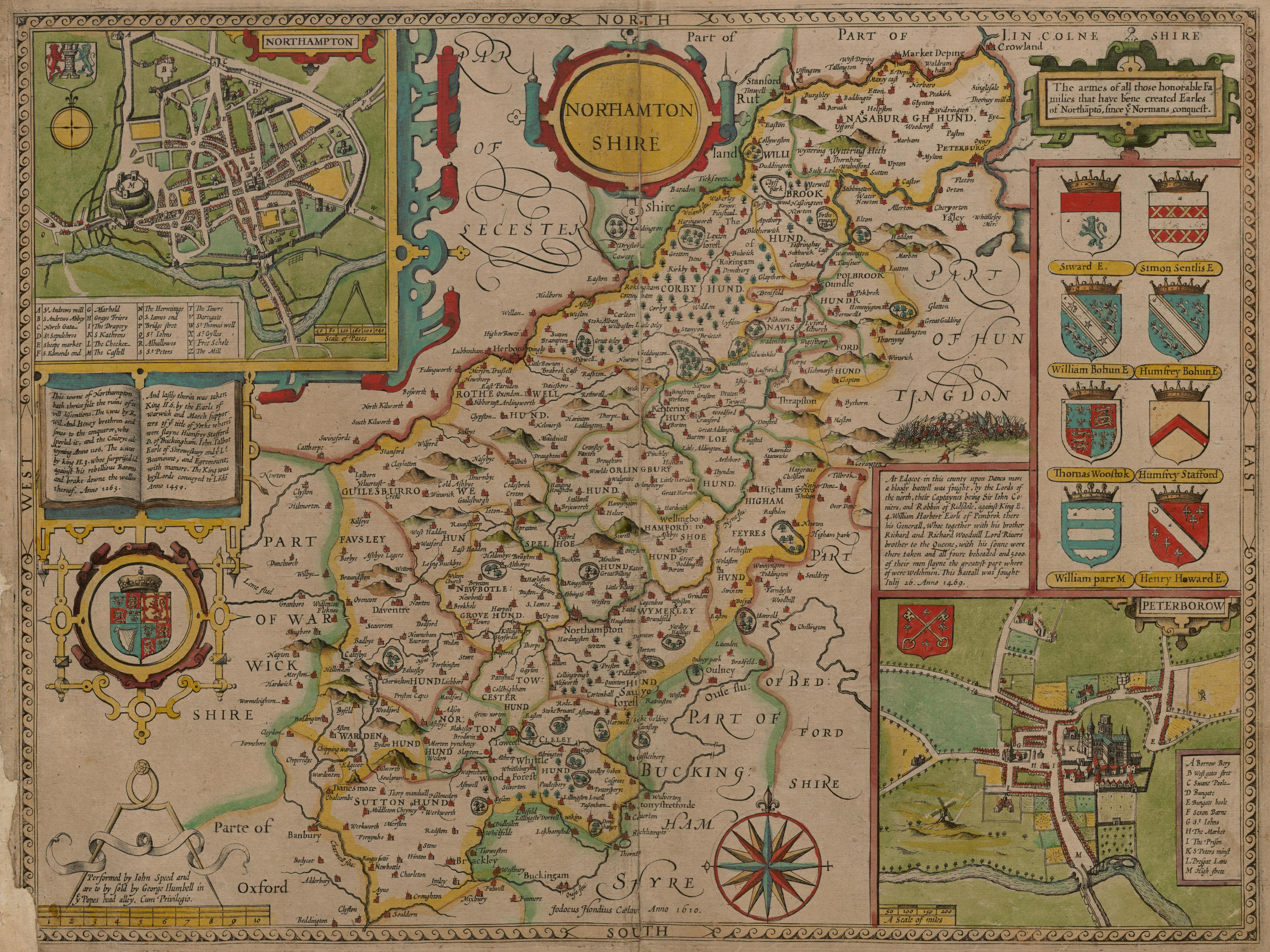
Northamptonshire, 1610

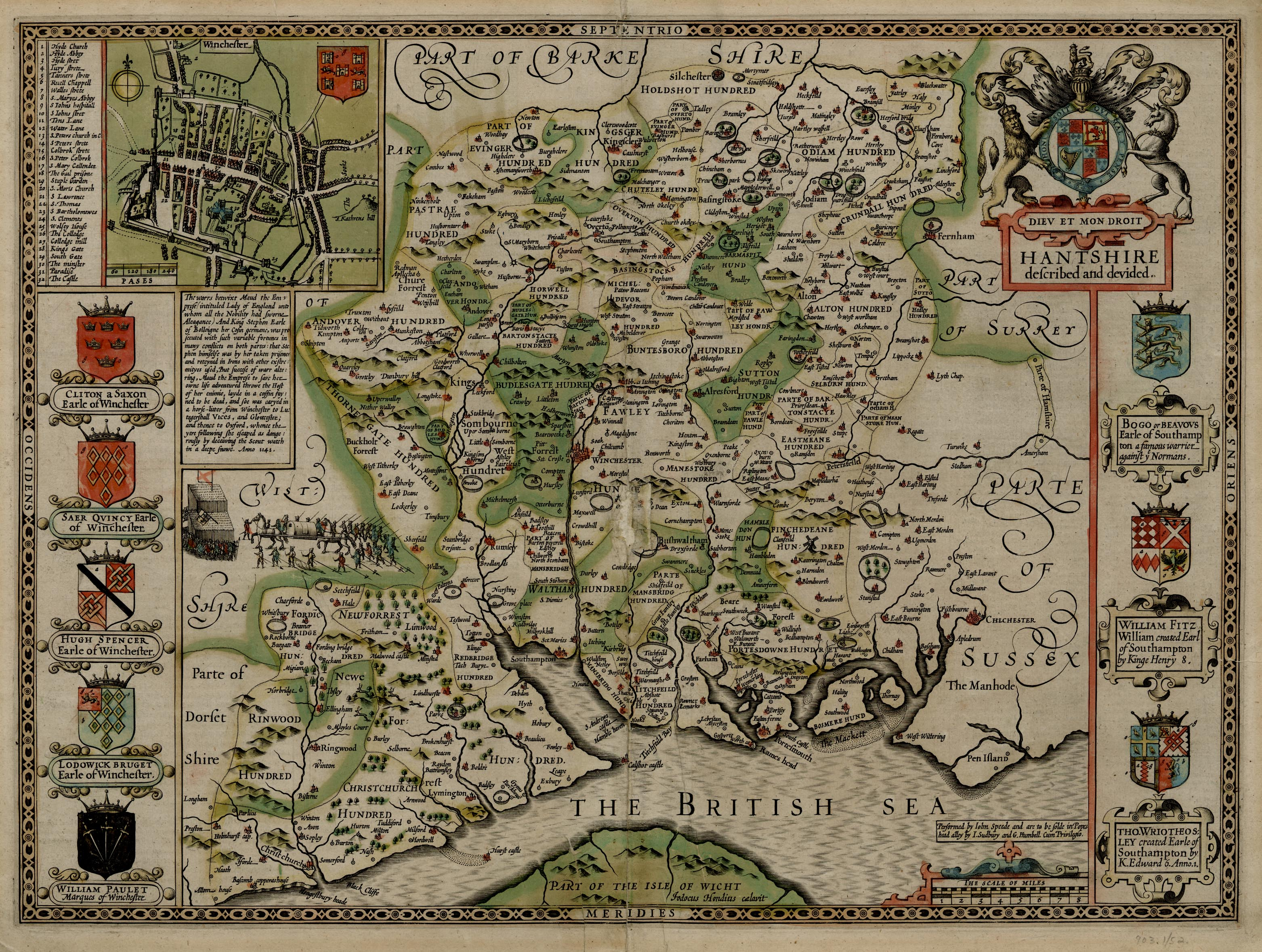
Hampshire, 1610

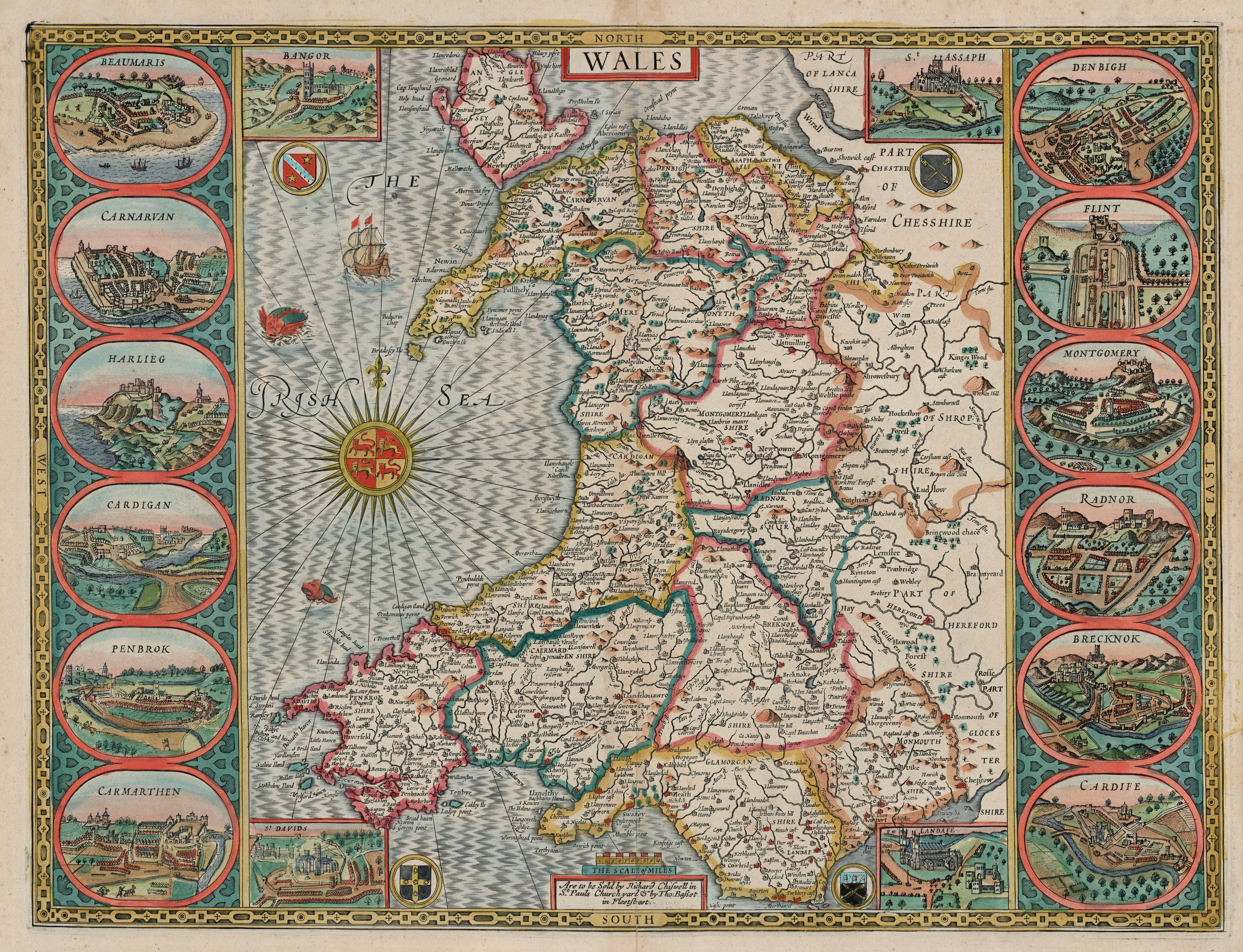
Wales, 1610

=== Town inserts (examples) ===
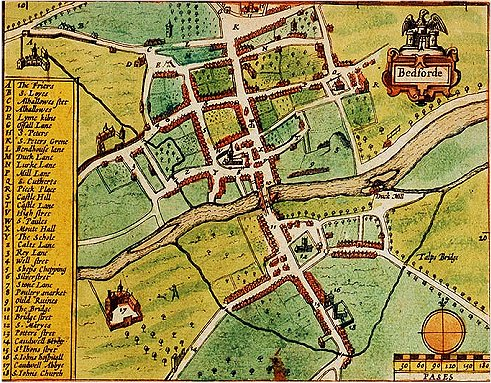
Bedforde, 1611

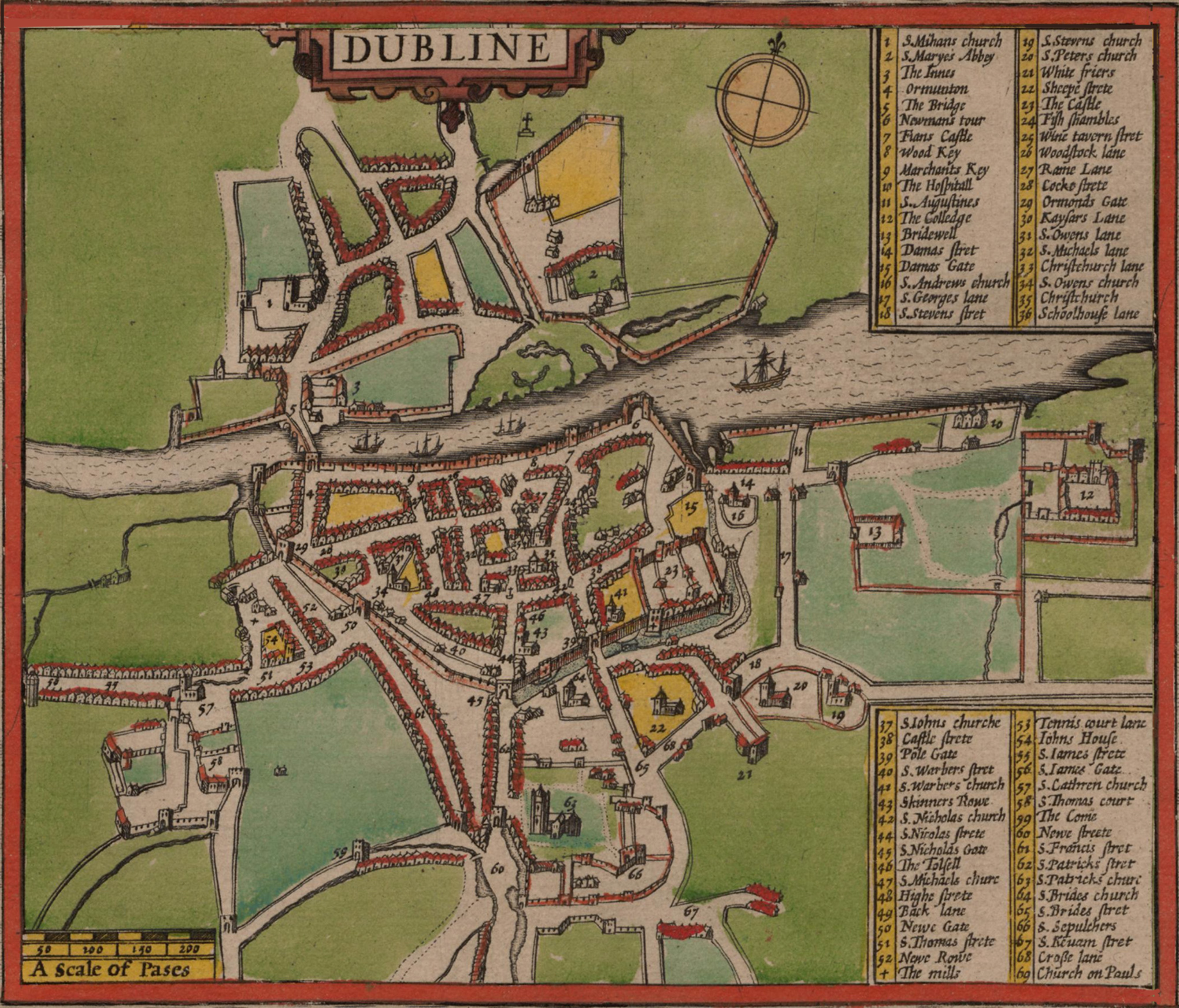
Dubline, 1610; an 1896 reprint

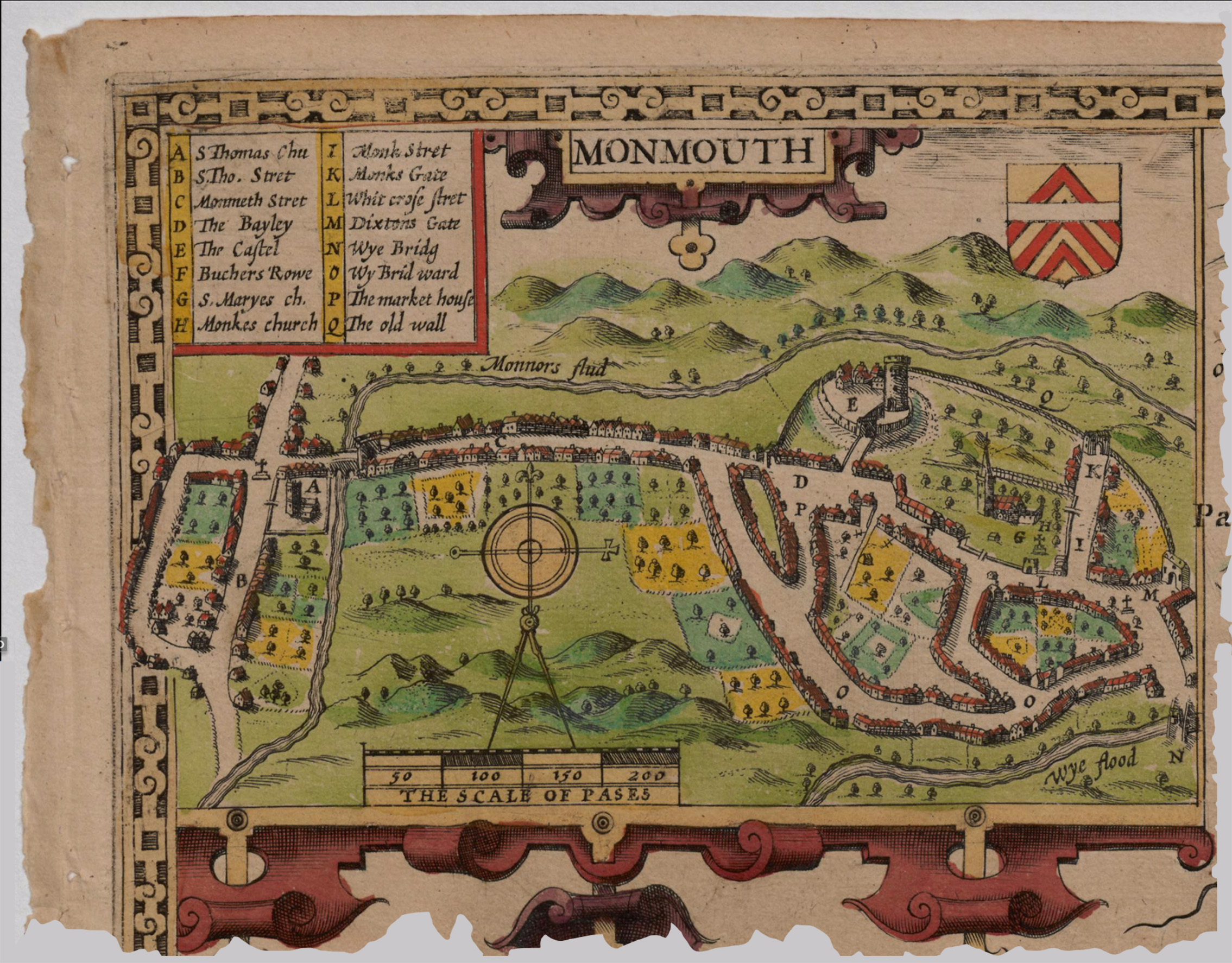
Monmouth, 1610

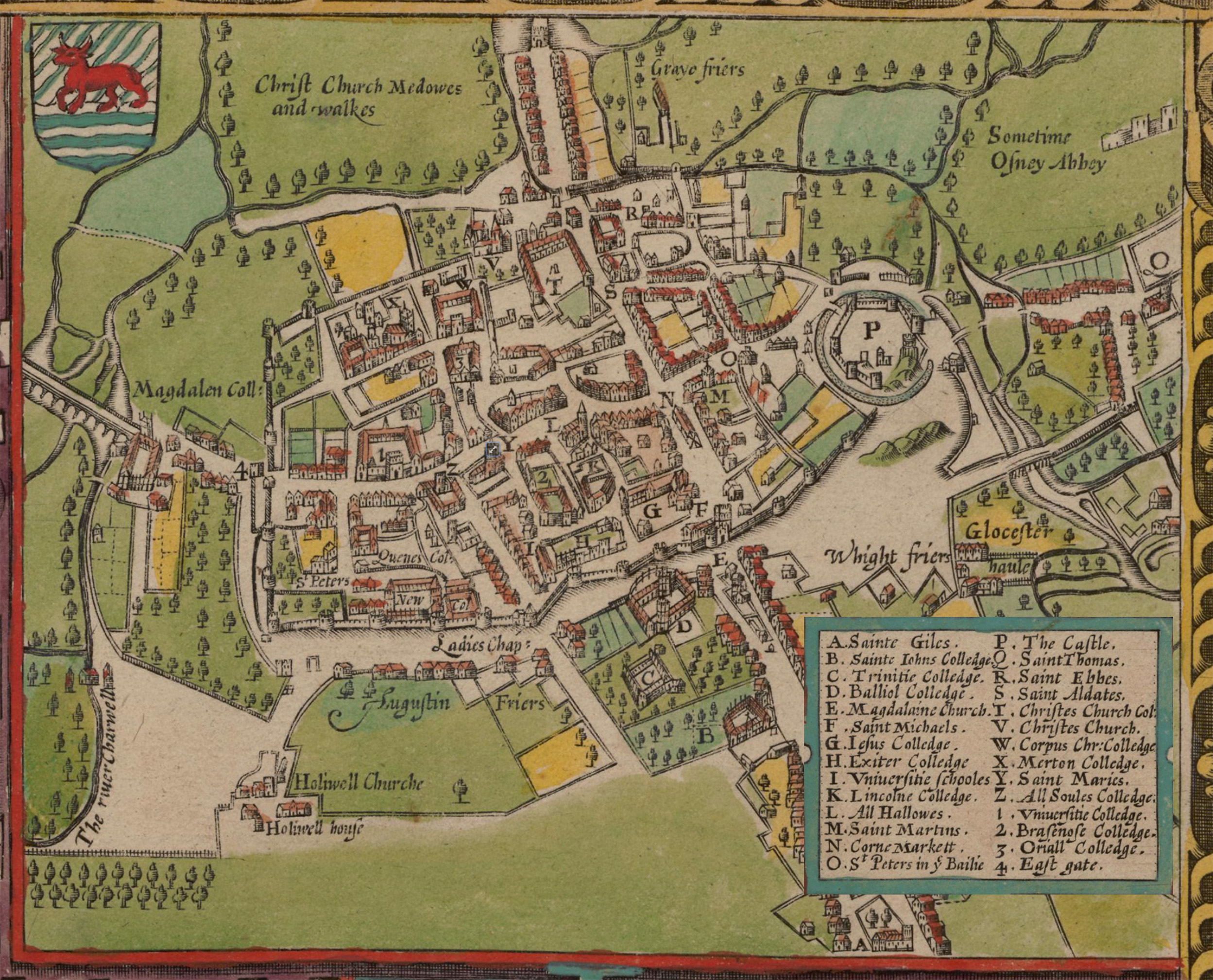
Oxford, 1610

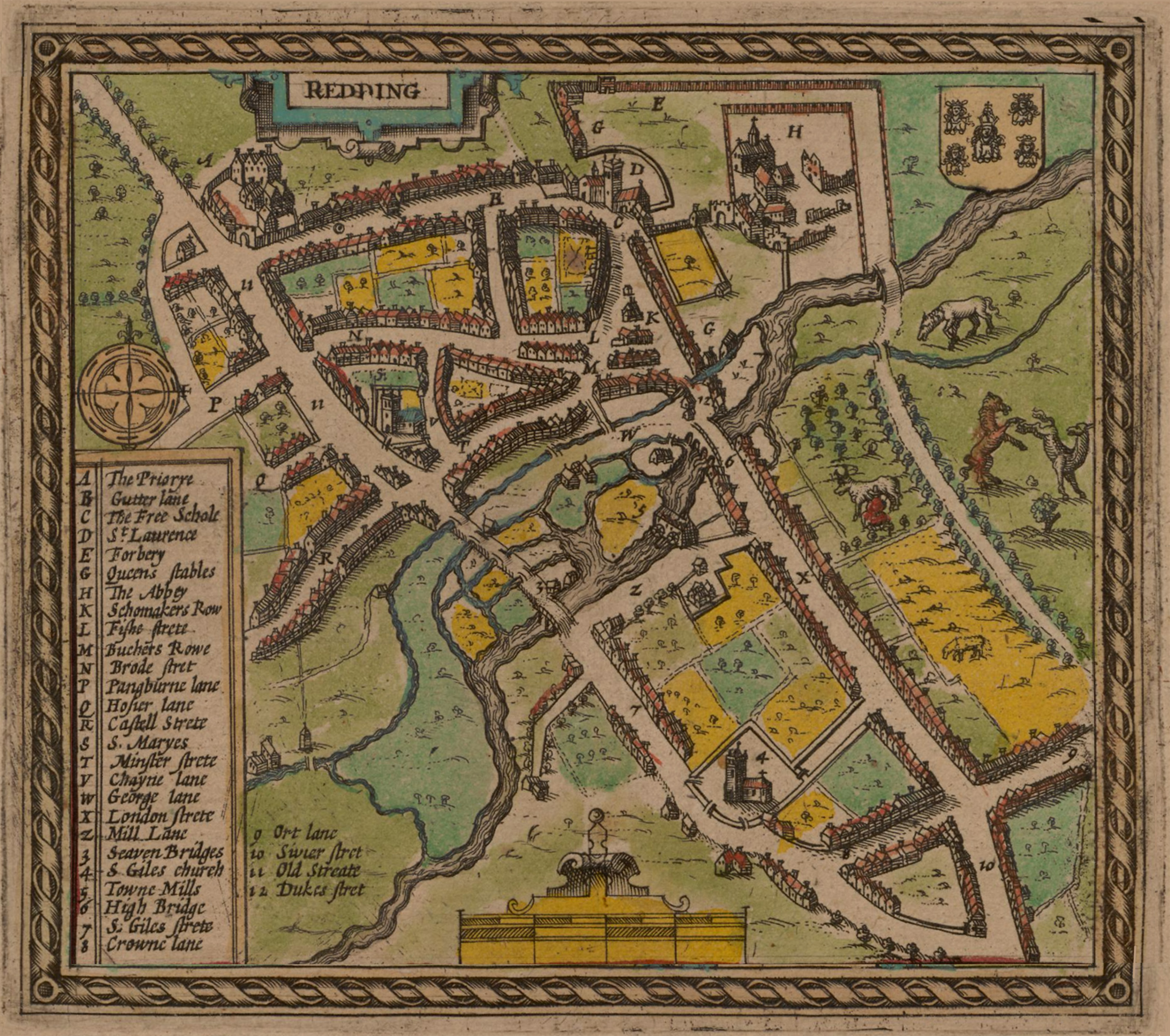
Redding, 1610

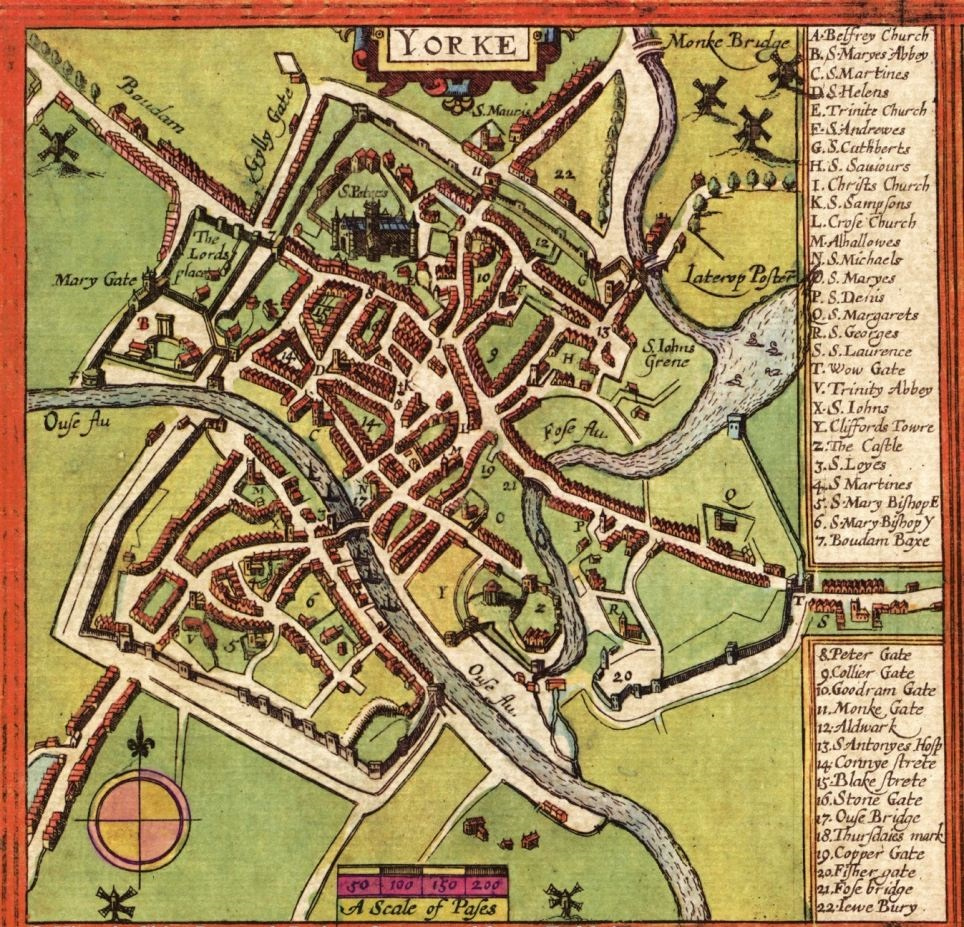
York, 1611

=== Views of Welsh towns (examples) ===
Speed represented Wales as a separate province from England but not as an independent entity.

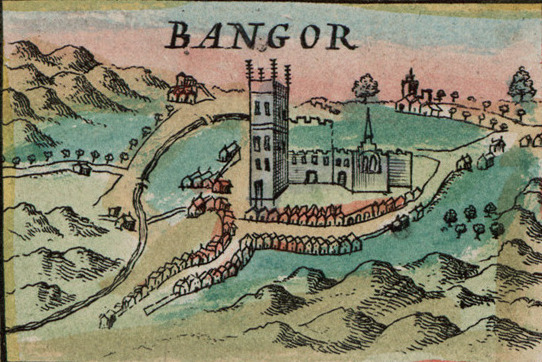
Bangor, 1610

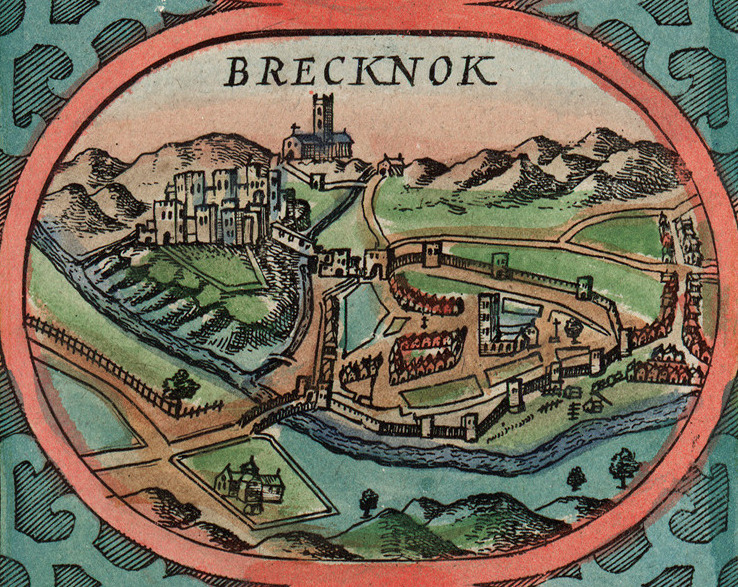
Brecon, 1610

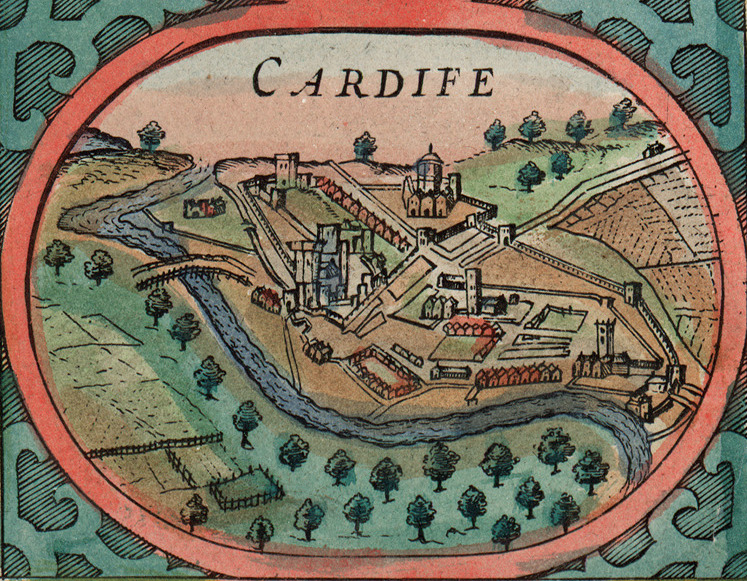
Cardiff, 1610

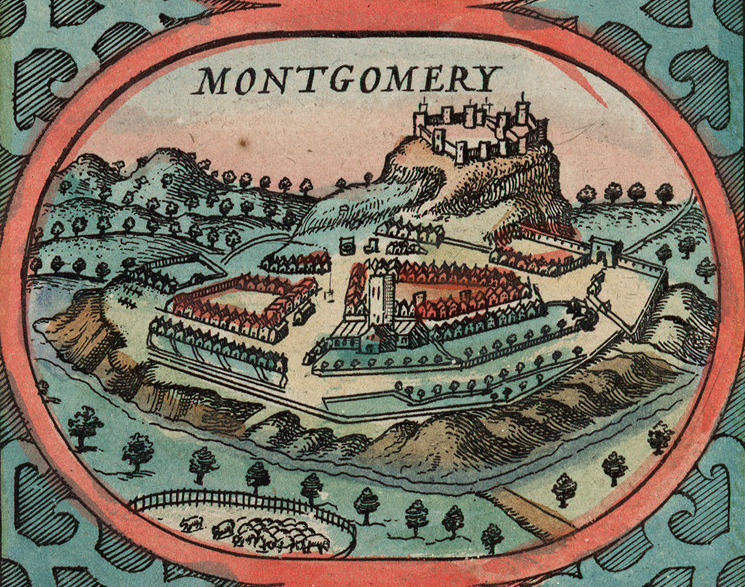
Montgomery, 1610

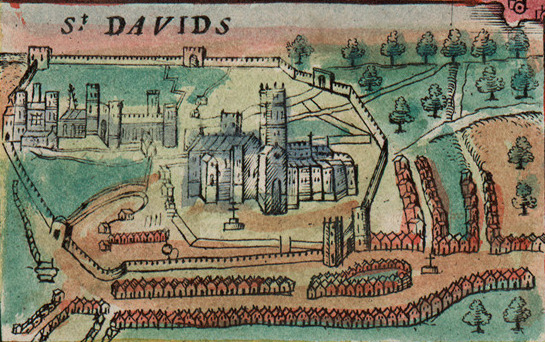
St David's, 1610

=== A Prospect of the Most Famous Parts of the World ===
In 1627, two years before his death, was published Speed's A Prospect of the Most Famous Parts of the World, printed by John Dawson for George Humble. This was the first world atlas produced by an Englishman. The principal sheets included the continents of 3, Asia, 5, Affrica, 7, Europe, 9, America; with the following domains, 11, Greece; 13, The Romane Empire; 15, Germanie; 17, Bohemia; 19, France; 21, Belgia; 23, Spaine; 25, Italia; 27, Hungarie; 29, Denmarke; 31, Poland; 33, Persia; 35, Turkish Empire; 37, Kingdom of China; 39, Tartarie; 41, Sommer Islands (Bermudas). With it were also included the County and Kingdom maps from the Theatre, corresponding to the third edition of that work, together with a New and Accurat Map of the World in a double hemisphere projection. A facsimile edition was published in 1966.

At 40 shillings, its circulation was limited to wealthier sort of customers, and to libraries, where many copies are nowadays preserved.

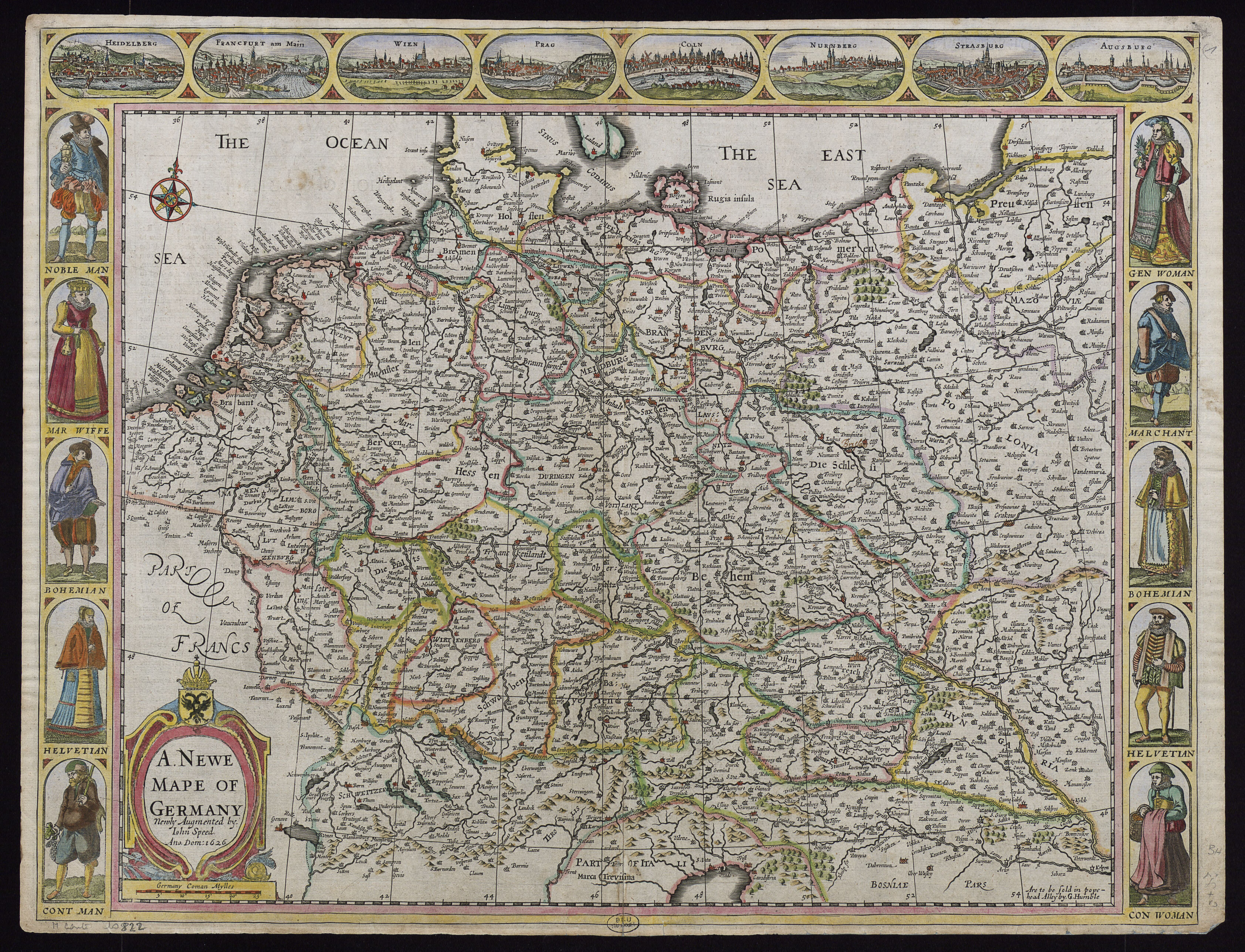
A Newe Mape of Germany, 1626

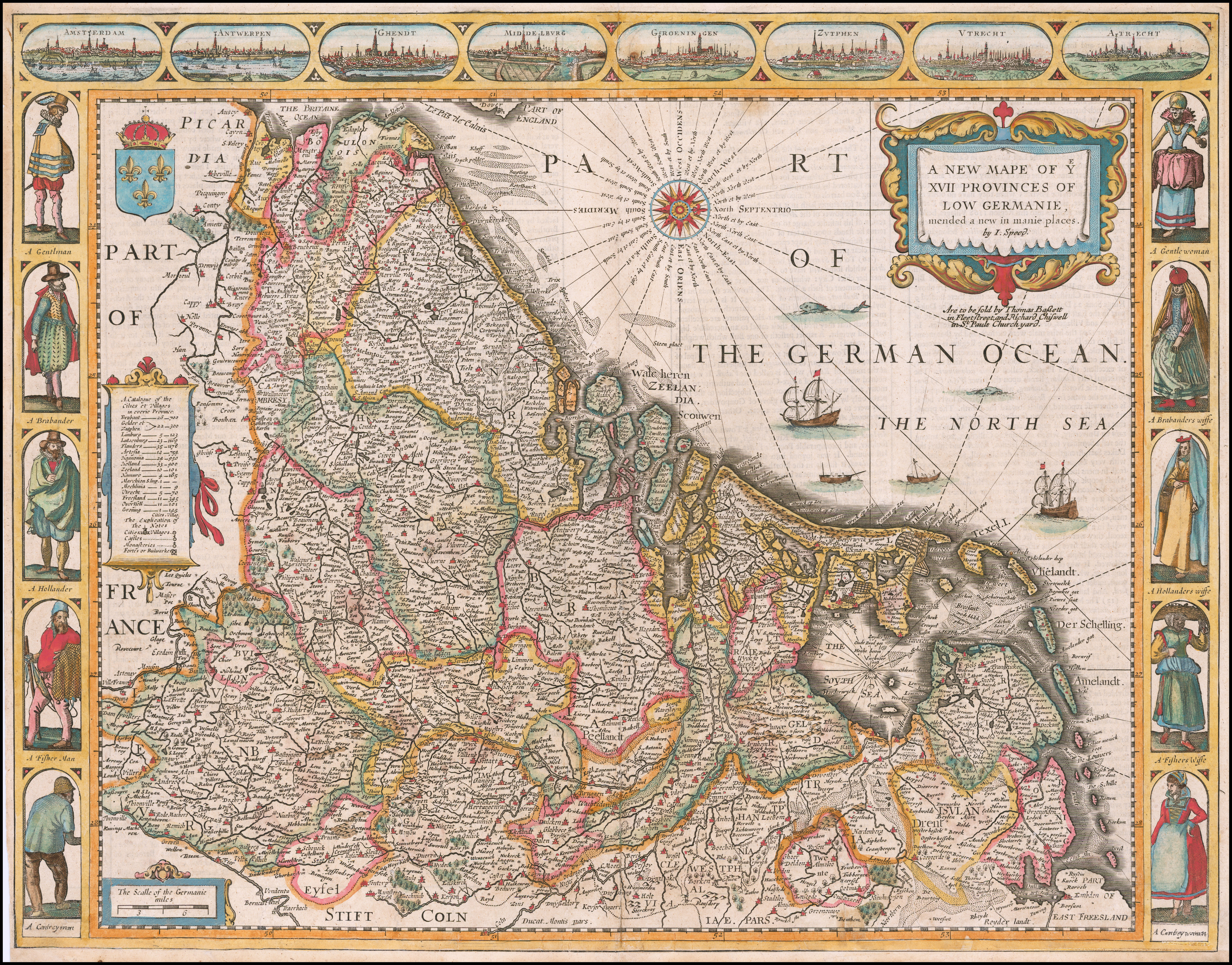
A New Mape of Ye XVII Provinces, 1626 (The Netherlands)

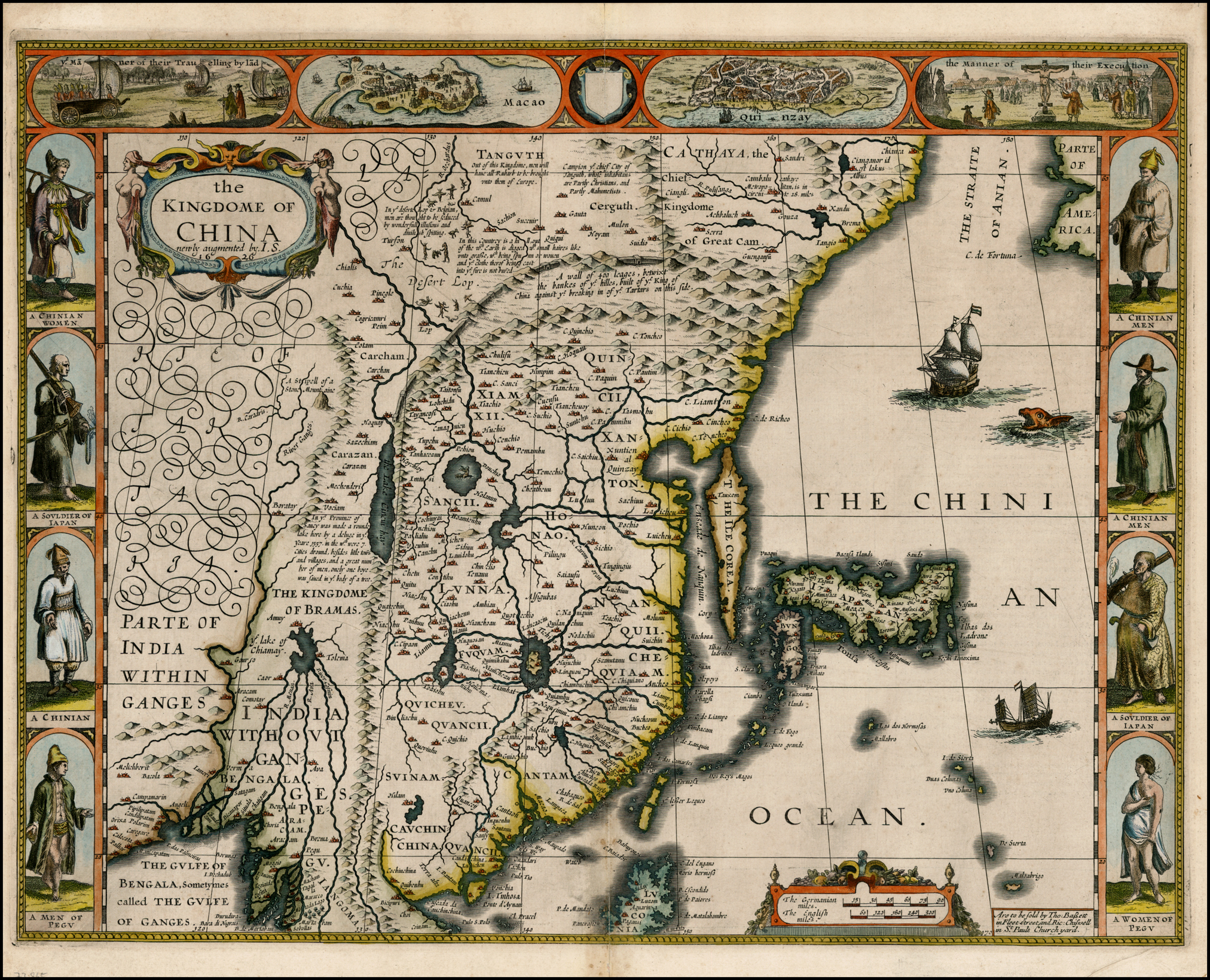
The Kingdome of China, 1626

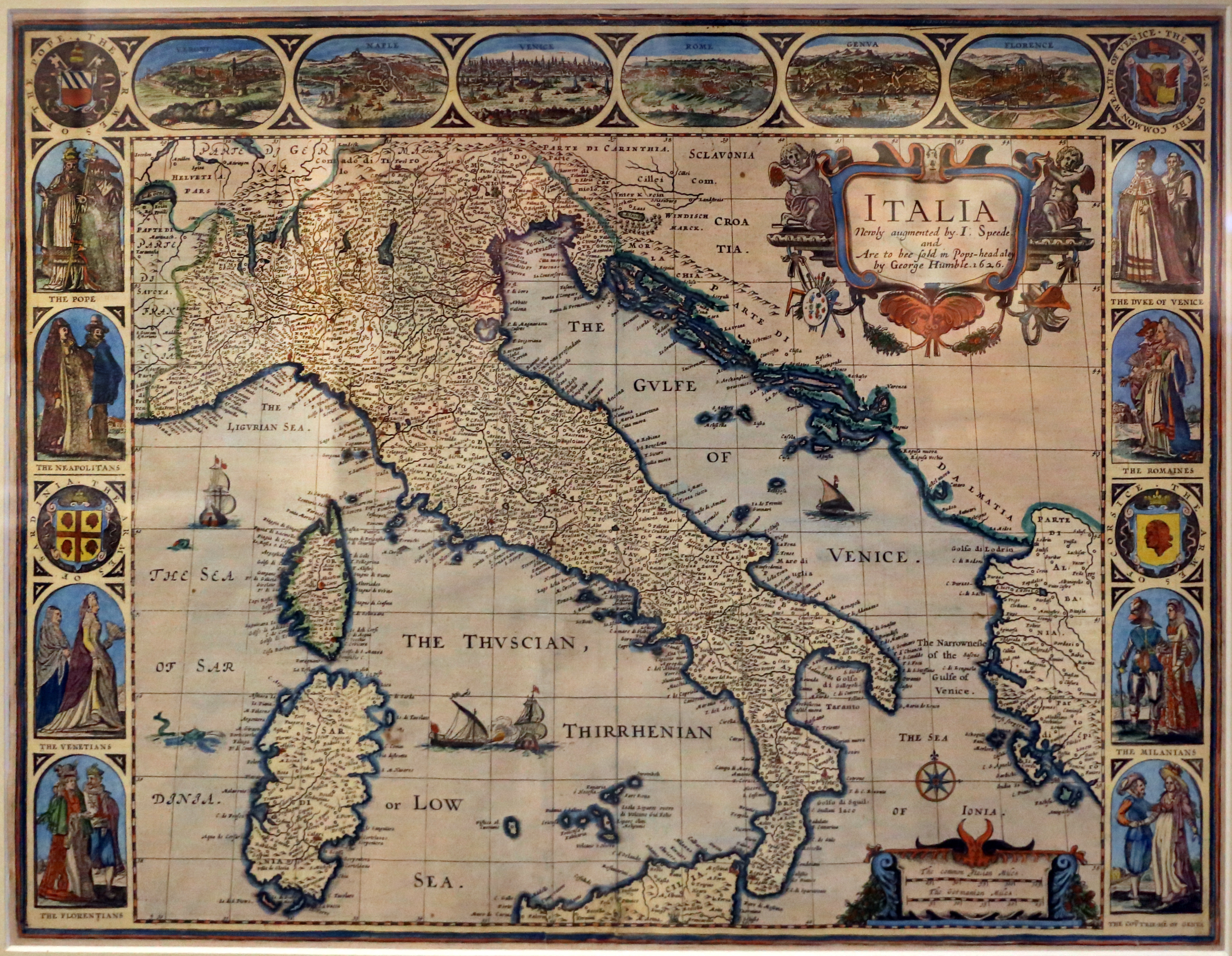
Italia, 1626

== Family ==
The pedigree for "Speed of Southampton", as prepared by the antiquary Benjamin Wyatt Greenfield in 1896, has the marriage of John Speed and Susanna daughter of Thomas Draper, Esq., of London, at its head, and shows the descendants of their son John. Although stating that Speed was born in 1542, and giving other dates which conflict with variant sources, it presents the names of six children. They are shown as:

- John Speed (1595-1640), M.D. (1628), studied at Merchant Taylor's School (1603–04), and was Scholar (1612), B.A. (1616), M.A. (1620) and Fellow of St John's College, Oxford. He married Margaret, daughter of Bartholomew Warner, M.D., of St John's College (Professor of Physic). John died testate in 1640 and is buried in the chapel of St John's College. Their sons:
  - John Speed was a student of St John's College, Oxford in 1652, and was Mayor of Southampton in 1681 and 1694.
  - Samuel Speed, D.D. of Christ Church, Oxford, died in 1674.
- Samuel Speed, Merchant Taylor of London, who married Joan, daughter of Richard Joyner, alias Lloyd, of Abingdon, and had a son Samuel who died in 1633
- Nathan Speed
- Joan Speed, who married John Hayley, Esq., of London
- Sarah Speed, who married Edward Blackmore, Esq., of London
- Anne Speed, who married Benjamin Wesley, citizen and Merchant Taylor of London

His arms, granted by William Camden, are: "Gules, on a chief or, two swifts volant proper". Crest: "On a wreath or and gules a swift volant proper." His monument, in the escutcheon within the broken pediment above the niche, shows these arms impaling "Azure a chevron Ermine between three estoiles Or."

From their funeral monument, it appears that John and Susanna Speed had 12 sons and 6 daughters in all.

== Monument and epitaph ==
=== Wall monument ===
Richard Newcourt described the monument to John Speede at St Giles without Cripplegate. "...the famous Chronologer and Historiographer John Speed, lies buried here, and hath a Monument on the South-side of the Chancel, with this inscription on one side for him, and on the other for his Wife":

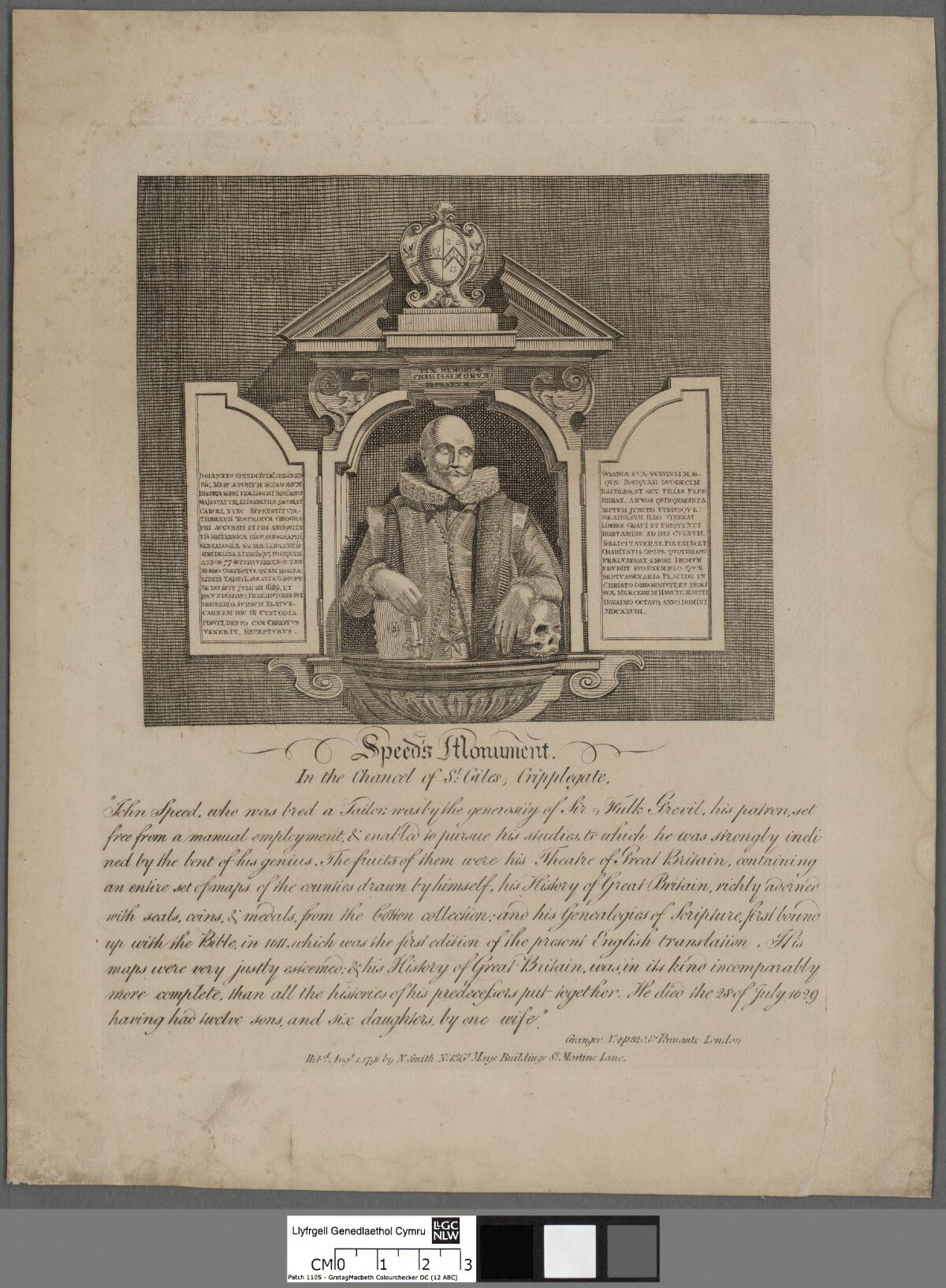
1790 engraving showing the original appearance of Speed's monument

Piæ Memoriæ Charissimorum Parentum -
Johannis Speed, Civis Londinensis Mercatorum Scissorum Fratris, servi fidelissimi Religiarum Majestatum, Eliz., Jacobi & Caroli nunc superstitis: Terrarum nostrarum Geographi accurati, & fidi Antiquitatis Britannicæ Historiographi, Genealogii sacræ elegantissimi delineatoris, qui postquam Annos 77. superaverat, non tam Morbo confectus, quam Mortalitatis taedio lassatus, Corpore se levavit, Julii 28. 1629. & jucundissimo Redemptoris sui desiderio sursum elatus carnem hic in custodiam posuit, denuo cum Christus venerit recepturus.
(To the Pious Memory of Most Beloved Parents" – [that is to say,]
of John Speed, Citizen of London of the Brethren of Merchant Taylors, a very faithful servant of their Devout Majesties Elizabeth, James and Charles that now is: the accurate Geographer of our Lands, reliable Historiographer of the Antiquity of Britain, and most elegant delineator of the sacred Genealogies, who, after he had lived 77 years, not so much defeated by illness as wearied out by the burden of Mortality, arose from the Body on 28 July 1629, and, being borne aloft in the joyous desire of his Redeemer, he laid down his flesh here in keeping, to be received anew when Christ shall come.)

Susannae suae suavissimae, quae postquam duodecim illi filios, & sex filias pepererat quinquaginta septem annos junctis utriusque solatiis, cum illo vixerat; liberos gravi et frequenti hortamine, ad Dei cultum solicitaverat; Pietatis et Charitatis opere quotidiano praeluxerat, emori demum erudiit suo exemplo. Quae septuagenaria placide in Christo obdormivit, et Fidei suae mercedem habuit, Martii vigesimo octavo, Anno Domini MDCXXVIII.
(Also of his sweetest Susannah, who after she had borne him twelve sons and six daughters, lived jointly in companionship with him for fifty seven years; she encouraged her children in their duty to God by serious and frequent exhortation; she shone brightly in the daily work of piety and charity, and at last gave instruction by her example of how to surrender life. Who as a septuagenarian placidly fell asleep in Christ and received the reward of her faith on 28 March, in the Year of Our Lord 1628.)

Although the monument was damaged by enemy action in 1940–1941, an engraving of 1791 by John Thomas Smith shows how the panels carrying the inscriptions were originally disposed as if forming the opened hinged doors of a cabinet. The church's website notes that it was "one of the few memorials that survived the bombing" of this church during the London Blitz of 1940–1941: a modern plaque records that the monument was restored in 1971 by the Merchant Taylors' Company, in which John Speed was a citizen and brother.

=== Monumental brass ===
In 1944 Sir William Burrell and Constance, Lady Burrell included a monumental brass, stated to be for the cartographer John Speed, among their collection donated to the city of Glasgow. It is described as a tomb brass representing a full-length male figure, 62.7 cm tall, facing three-quarters to the right [i.e. his left side turned away], his hands joined in prayer. He has short hair with a trimmed beard and moustache, and wears a gown and cape over a buttoned tunic surmounted by a ruff. The expression "tomb brass" suggests that this figure may have belonged to a group set into the covering slab of a stone table tomb (as opposed to a floor matrix), an inference supported by the comparatively unworn condition of the engraving.

The latten is torn away at the toe, suggesting a forceful detachment, but the rivet-holes by which the brass was originally attached to its stone matrix are neatly preserved, suggesting careful removal. The position of the figure indicates that there was once a corresponding, facing plate representing a wife. The squared edge of the brass plate below the foot possibly rested against another brass plate bearing an inscription. The descriptions by Newcourt, Strype and Granger of Speed's monument agree with the text (including the words "On the other side of him" to introduce the inscription for Susanna) given in Anthony Munday's 1633 edition of Stow's Survey of London, and all clearly refer to the wall monument and inscriptions depicted by Smith and now remaining in restored form. If, however, the attribution of this brass to a tomb monument for John Speed is correct, it may enlarge the view of the original appearance of Speed's monument as it stood on the south side of the chancel of St Giles. The brass is on display in the Burrell Collection.

== Interpretations ==
=== John Speed and William Shakespeare ===
William Shakespeare had near connections with St Giles, Cripplegate parish, of which John Speed was a parishioner. In his account of the reign of King Henry V, John Speed mentions that the character of Sir John Oldcastle, a Lollard martyr in Henry V's time, was falsely represented in the theatres as a stock buffoon and rogue. He wrote,

The author of The Three Conversions hath made Oldcastle a ruffian, a robber and a rebel, and his authority, taken from the stage players, is more befitting the pen of his slanderous report, than the credit of the judicious, being only grounded from this papist and his poet, of like conscience for lies, the one ever feigning and the other ever falsifying the truth.

The author of The Three Conversions was the Jesuit Robert Persons, and the references to the Lollard martyr Oldcastle are in the third part of the work. Speed is saying that Persons the Catholic author had infamously falsified the historical character of Oldcastle the Lollard martyr by representing him as the cowardly rebel portrayed in the late Elizabethan stage plays. Thomas Fuller, in his Church-History of Britain (1655), evidently echoes Speed where he remarks:

Stage-poets have themselves been very bold with, and others very merry at, the memory of Sr John Oldcastle, whom they have fancied a boon Companion, a jovial Royster, and yet a Coward to boot, contrary to the credit of all Chronicles, owning him a Martial man of merit. The best is, Sr John Falstaffe, hath relieved the Memory of Sr John Oldcastle, and of late is substituted Buffoone in his place, but it matters as little what petulant Poets, as what malicious Papists, have written against him."

While Shakespeare's character of Sir John Falstaff is evidently based on the stage-Oldcastle model, under a different name, the inference drawn by some editors (since Nicholas Rowe) that Speed was referring specifically to Shakespeare, or (if he was), that he intended to associate Shakespeare directly with Robert Persons and his Catholic sympathies, has long been debated. Possibly, Speed was referring to the author of a different play in which the Oldcastle figure appeared by name. A summary of the argument was presented by Edmond Malone's editors.

John Speed's maps and associated commentaries are sometimes employed for the interpretation of William Shakespeare's plays. Speed's historiography employs "theatrical metaphors" and makes use of medieval mythical content.

=== Appreciation ===
In later years, Robert Sheringham (who recited Speed's text to his map of the Isle of Wight) referred to him as "summus et eruditus Antiquarius" (a foremost and erudite antiquary), and he was called "our English Mercator"; "a person of extraordinary industry and attainments in the study of antiquities" (by William Nicolson); an "honest and impartial historian... who was furnished with the best materials from some of the most considerable persons in this kingdom" (by Stephen Hyde Cassan), a "faithful Chronologer" (in a text of 1656), and "our Cheshire historian...a scholar...a distinguished writer on history" (by Charles Hulbert). Richard Newcourt called him a "celebrated chronologer and historiographer"; James Granger observed, "his History of Great Britain was in its kind incomparably more complete than all the histories of his predecessors put together."

"And thus" (says Thomas Fuller), "we take our leaves of Father Speed, truly answering his name, in both the acceptions thereof, for celerity and success."

== Persistence ==
His maps were used in high-income circles, and therefore Speed's influence was long-lasting and far-reaching. In 1673 and 1676 long after his death, other maps were published under his name obviously being counterfeits abusing the brand to represent the British Isles, the Chesapeake Bay region, and specifically Virginia and Maryland, the East Indies, the Russian Empire (then ruled by Peter the Great), Jamaica, and Barbados, and other locations. With these printings and many others, Speed's maps became the basis for world maps until at least the mid-eighteenth century: his British maps formed an important topographical resource long after their original publication.

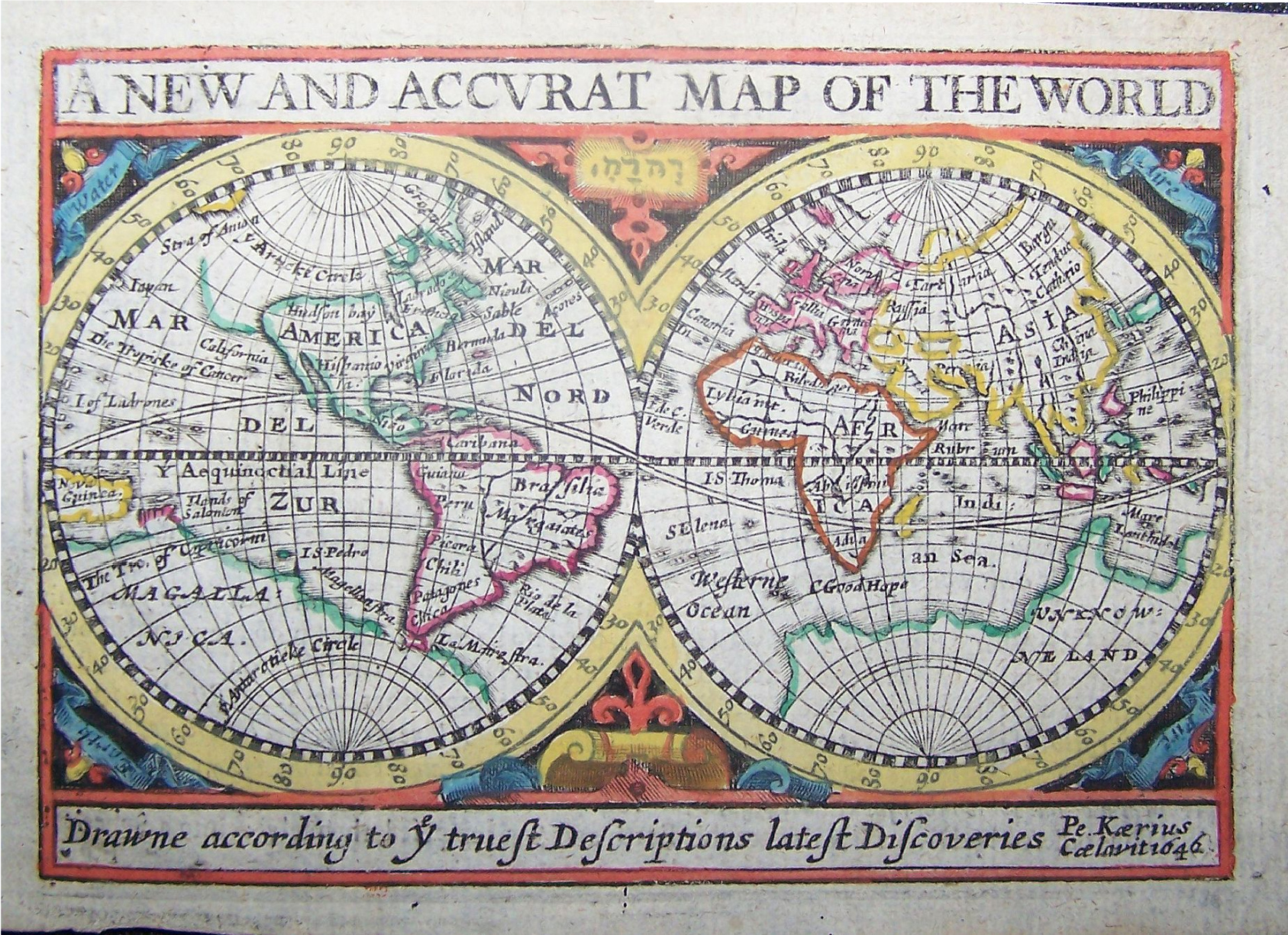
A New And Accvrat Map of the World, 1646 miniature edition

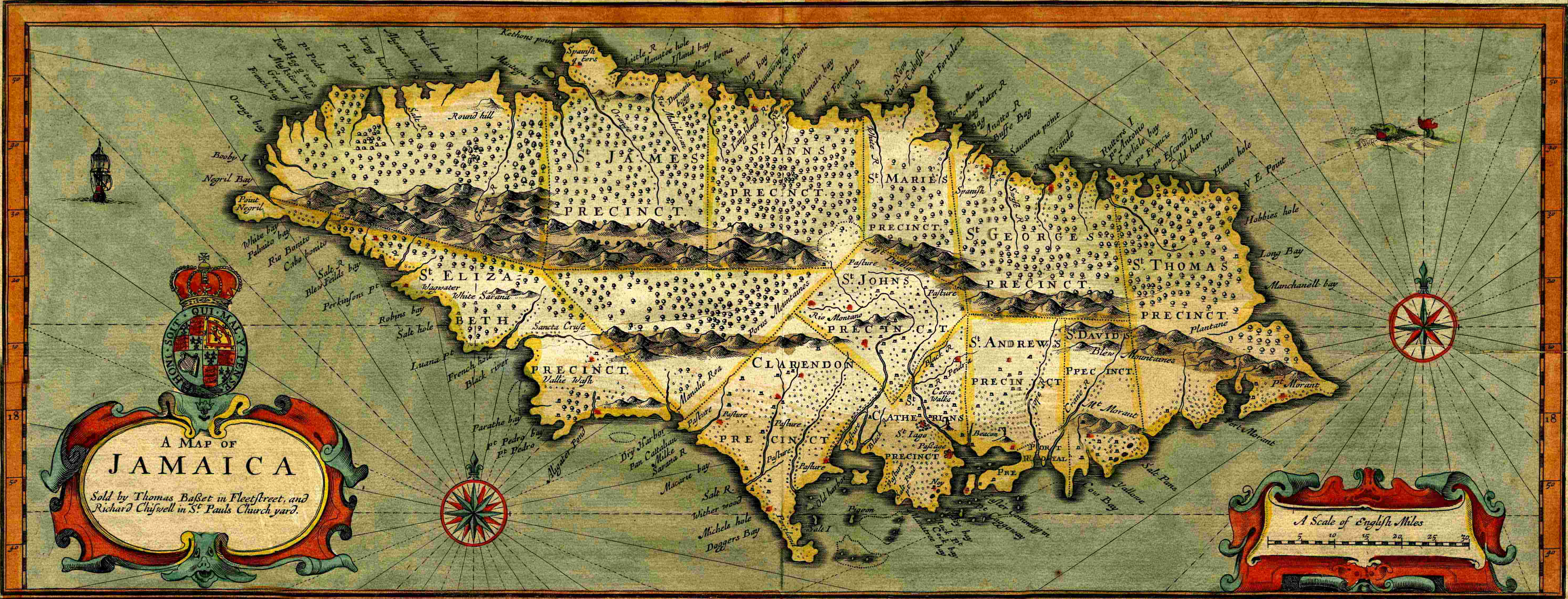
Jamaica, 1676

== Published works ==
- The Theatre of The Empire of Great Britaine, Presenting an exact geography of England, Scotland, and Ireland (London 1611–12). Full text (including the History) at Umich/eebo.
- Theatrum Imperii Magnae Britanniae, Latin Edition (London 1616). Page views at gallica (Bibliothèque Nationale Française).
- History of Great Britaine Under the Conquests of Romans, Saxons, Danes, and Normans, 1st Edition (London 1611), text at Umich/eebo. Re-issue (London 1614) Second, Revised Edition (London 1623).
- The Genealogies recorded in the Sacred Scriptures according to euery family and tribe with the line of Our Sauior Jesus Christ obserued from Adam to the Blessed Virgin Mary (London 1611). 1636 printing bound into 1637 Robert Barker bible.
- A Cloud of Witnesses: and they the holy genealogies of the sacred scriptures. Confirming unto us the truth of the histories in Gods most holie word; and the humanitie of Christ Iesus 1st Edition (London 1616). Second Edition (London 1620), text at Umich/eebo.
- England, Wales, Scotland and Ireland: Described and Abridged with Ye Historic Relation of Things Worthy Memory: from a Farr Larger Voulume (London 1627) The "Farr Larger Volume" is The Theatre of The Empire of Great Britaine.
- A Prospect of the Most Famous Parts of the World (London 1627)

== Miscellanea ==
- In 1969, the first residential block to be completed on the Barbican Estate in London was named Speed House. All the Barbican's residential buildings are named after famous people with a connection to the locale.
- Speed's descendants included Sir Keith Speed, MP (1934–2018).
