= John Speed map of Canaan =

1595 map of the Land of Israel

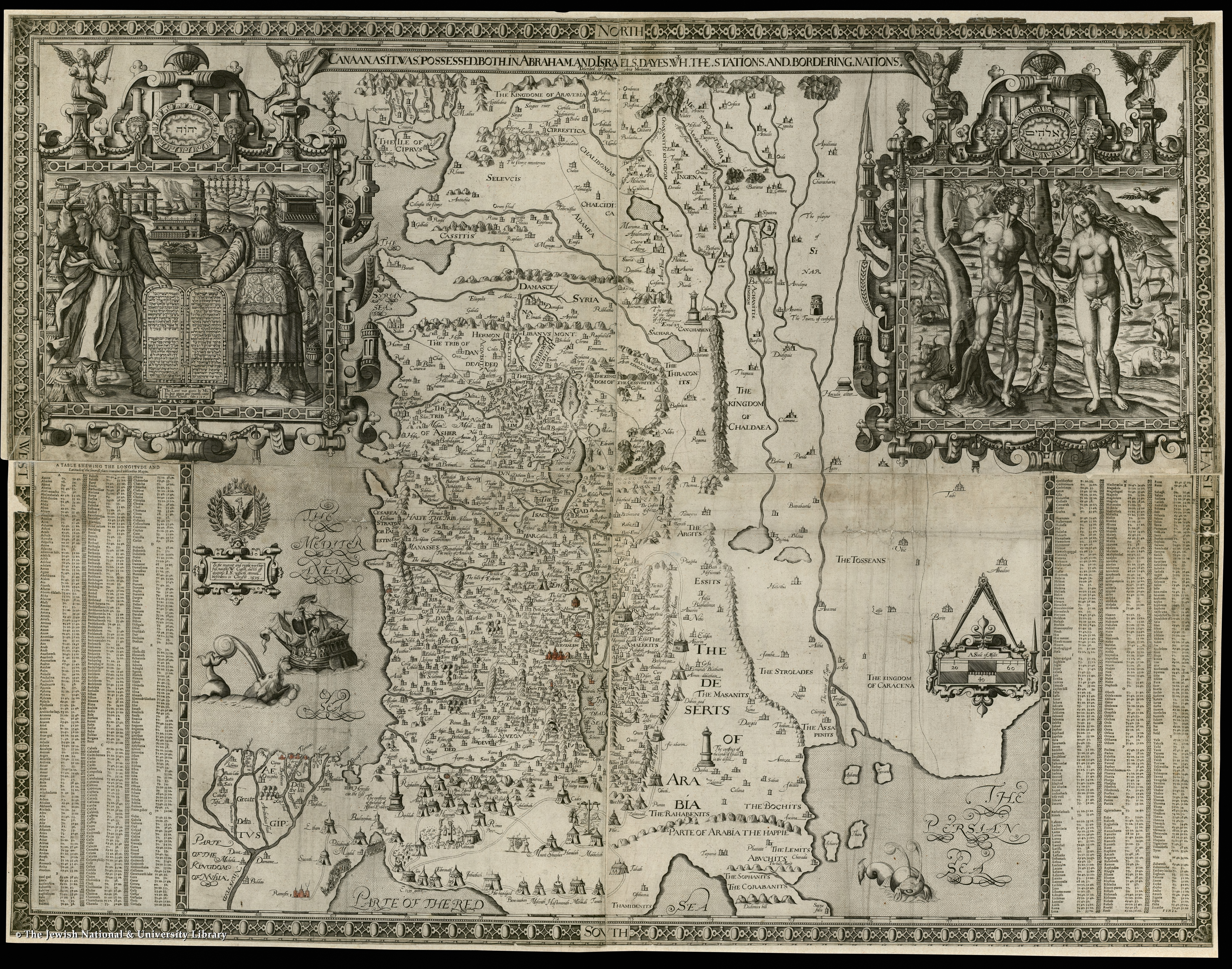
Canaan as it was possessed both in Abraham and Israels dayes with the stations and bordering nations

The John Speed map of Canaan, formally titled "Canaan as it was possessed both in Abraham and Israels dayes with the stations and bordering nations," is an ancient wall map of the Land of Canaan drawn by the English historian and cartographer John Speed in 1595. It is the first map to be drawn by Speed. Today the only copy of the map is found within the Eran Laor maps collection in the National Library of Israel in Jerusalem.

== Description ==
The map is printed on four sheets as divided to quadrants, with the dimension of each being 957 by 745 millimeters.

The map is based on the map of Benito Arias Montano, which in turn is based on the map of Santo Vesconta, while the map of Speed is larger than those other two and includes areas that don't appear on those: Mesopotamia at the Fertile Crescent area, the Arabian Peninsula, the shores of Turkey and of Cyprus island, and the Nile Delta in Egypt. The map also includes historical-biblical details: The story of The Exodus - the Israelites' route out of Egypt with illustrations of miniature figures and events along the route, the formation of the land of Israel with the borders of the Israeli tribes in marking with striated lines, and the story of Jonah and the whale illustrated off shore from the city Ascalon with the whale opening his mouth in order to swallow the prophet Jonah. On the sides of the bottom right and left quadrants appear two tables of references, according to longitude and latitude lines of sites on the map.

The map has decorative enframes-cartouches on its sides, with two big cartouches at the top quadrants and two small ones at the bottom quadrants. The big cartouche at the top left shows the biblical Israeli leaders Moses and Aaron placing their hands on Israel's Tablets of the Law with the Ten Commandments inscribed in Hebrew. Above them at the top of the cartouche frame within another frame, appears a caption of the Hebrew word "יְהֹוָה" - YHWH, the tetragrammaton as the most sacred name of God. The big cartouche at the top right quadrant shows the biblical story of Adam and Eve in Paradise, which is based on Albrecht Dürer's engraving from 1504 under the title Adam and Eve - with small differences between the two (Note: With the most notable changes being expressed by the animals that appear on Speed's map and Dürer's engraving: On Dürer's engraving Eve looks at Adam with her face in profile, while on Speed's map she faces the front; On Dürer's engraving a bull lies to the right of Eve, while on Speed's map it lies to the left of Adam). Above them at the top of the cartouche frame within another frame, appears a caption of the Hebrew word "אֱלֹהִים" - Elohim as the second name of God. The small cartouche at the bottom left quadrant shows a heraldic eagle and an inscription to sir Robert Cotton who encouraged Speed to start drawing maps.
