= New Court (disambiguation) =

New Court may refer to:

- New Court (also known as The Rothschild Headquarters) is a collection of proximate buildings in London having served as the global headquarters of the Rothschild investment bank since 1809.
- Corpus Christi College, Cambridge#New Court
- New Court, Emmanuel College, Cambridge
- St John's College, Cambridge#New Court's Clock Tower
- Trinity College, Cambridge#New Court
- Old Court – New Court controversy 19th-century political controversy in the U.S. state of Kentucky

== See also ==
- Newcourt (disambiguation)
