= Richard Newcourt (cartographer) =

Richard Newcourt (died 1679) was an English topographical draughtsman and cartographer.

== Life ==
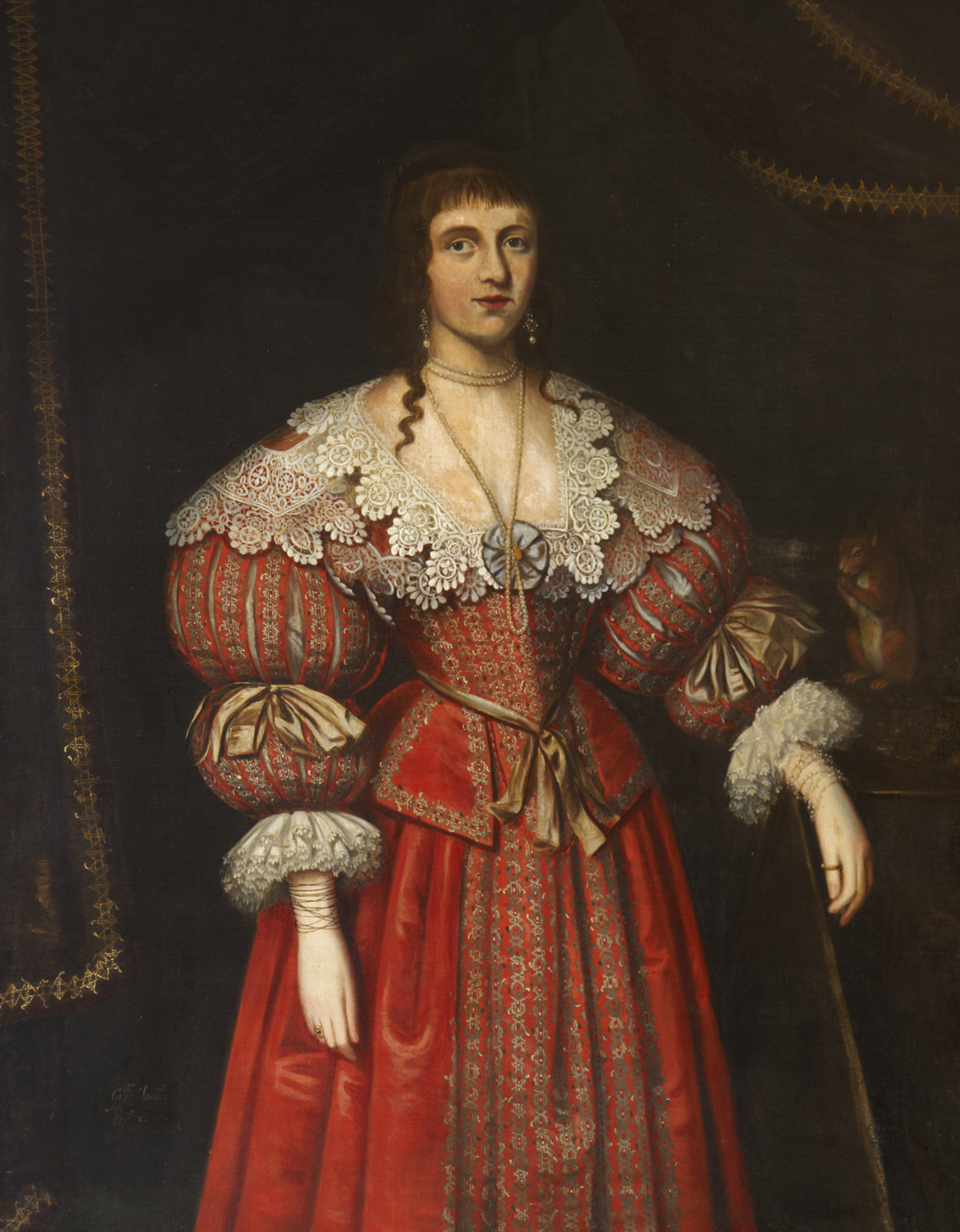
After Elizabeth Hext (pictured) died in 1657, Richard Newcourt was granted admonition of her will.

He was the second son of Philip Newcourt of Tiverton, Devon, and his wife Mary (née Tucker). Newcourt was baptised at Washfield, near Tiverton.

In 1633 he is recorded as having been granted admonition of the will of Sir Edward Hext, his father's half-brother, and in 1657 he received permission to act in the same capacity for Hext's daughter Elizabeth, the widow of Sir John Stawell of Cothelstone, Somerset. He came into possession of an estate at Somerton, Somerset, where he lived. In November 1652, Parliament resolved that Newcourt's name should be inserted into the "Additional Bill for Sale of several Lands and Estates forfeited to the Commonwealth for Treason."

== Architectural drawings and the map of London ==
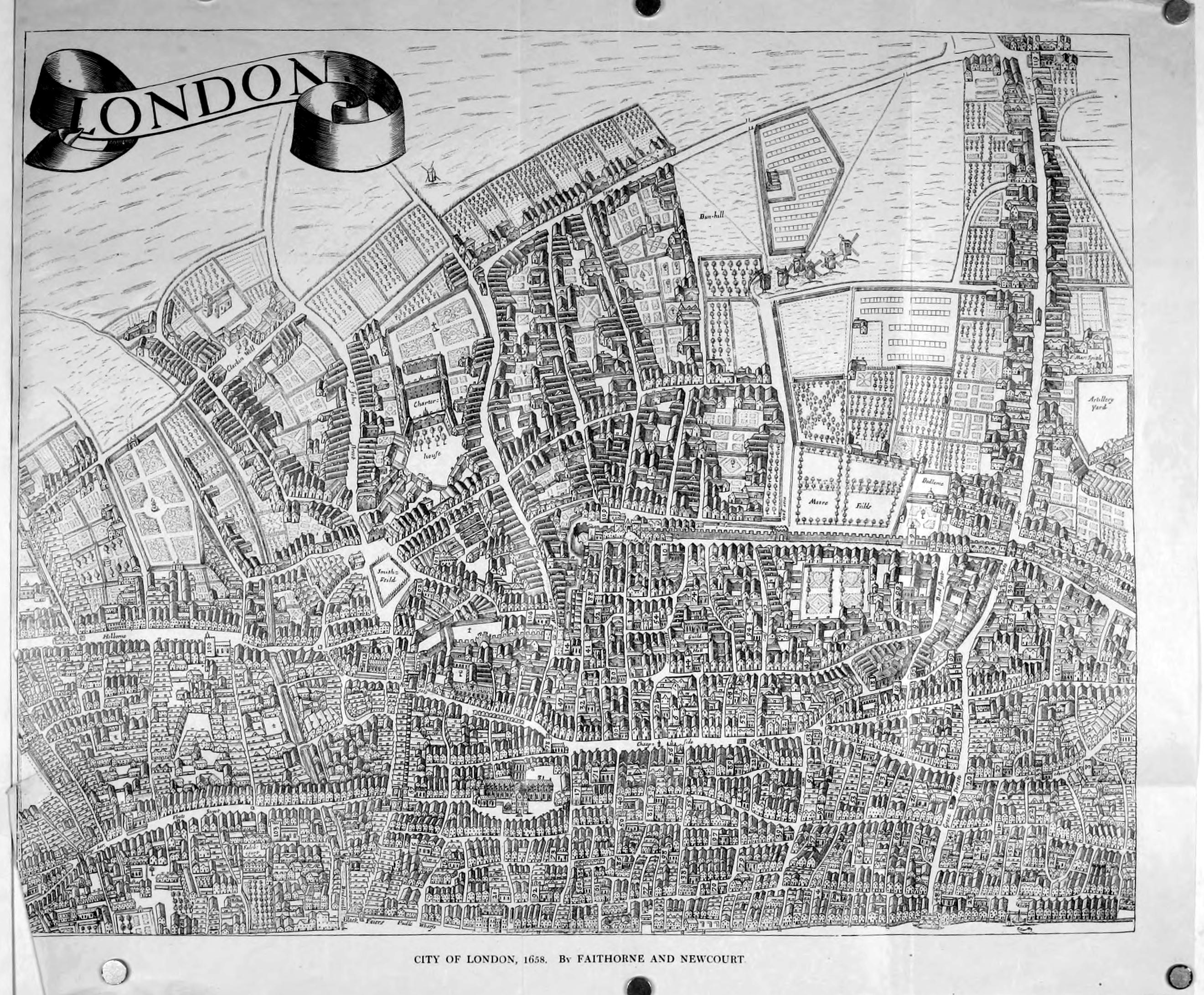
Map of London; William Faithorne (engraver), Richard Newcourt (draughtsman)

He drew some views of religious houses which were engraved as illustrations to his friend Sir William Dugdale's Monasticon Anglicanum.He later drew a map of London which was to become the most important ones of the city executed before the Great Fire. It was engraved by William Faithorne the Elder and published in 1658 as An Exact Delineation of the Cities of London and Westminster and the Suburbs thereof, Together with ye Burrough of Southwark And all ye Thorough-fares Highwaies Streetes Lanes and Common Allies wthin ye same Composed by a Scale, and Ichnographically described by Richard Newcourt of Somerton in the Countie of Somersett Gentleman. The map was a large one, printed on four sheets and measuring more than five feet across. Although drawn as a "view map," it offers little information about individual buildings, the representations being largely conventional. It became extremely rare; for much of the 19th century only one copy was known, in the Bibliothèque Nationale in Paris, but during the 1850s a second copy was discovered, and a facsimile published.

== Plan for the rebuilding of London ==
Following the Great Fire, Newcourt drew up a plan for the rebuilding of the City of London. He proposed laying the city out on a grid system, which would have divided it into 64 equal portions. Four adjoining divisions would have been left open to form a large central square, surrounded by houses after the pattern of those in the Piazza at Covent Garden, and four others would also have provided open spaces, one of them containing the rebuilt St Paul's Cathedral. Each of the other 55 areas would have formed a single parish, with a church and churchyard at its centre. A wharf, 60 yards wide would have run along the river, lined by an unbroken row of buildings raised on arches. Newcourt also produced a variant plan, under which the city would have been divided into only 39 parishes. The full text of his manuscript was published in the first volume of David Hughson's London in 1805.

== Death ==
Newcourt died in 1679, and was buried with his wife at Somerton. In his will, dated 25 March 1675, and proved on 4 July 1679, he mentions his eldest son, also named Richard Newcourt, his second son, Gerard, who succeeded him at Somerton; and his daughter, Mary, wife of Thomas Spicer of Somerton.

== Sources ==
This article incorporates text from a publication now in the public domain: "Newcourt, Richard (d.1679)" . Dictionary of National Biography. London: Smith, Elder & Co. 1885–1900.
