= Richard Newcourt (historian) =

English notary and historian (died 1716)

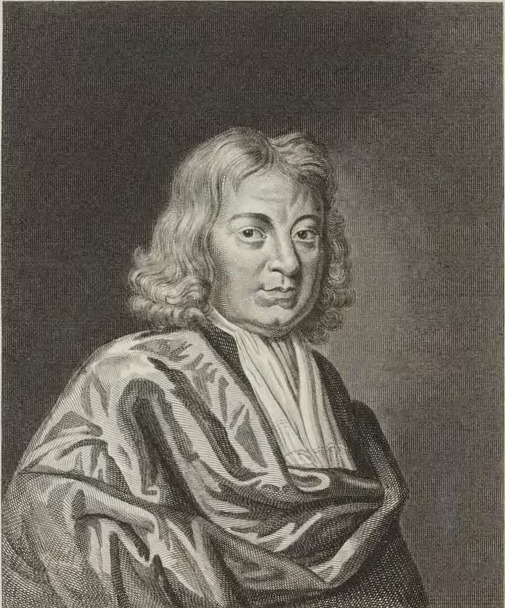
- Died: 1716
- Education: Wadham College
- Occupations: Writer, notary
- Father: Richard Newcourt

Richard Newcourt (died 1716) was an English notary and historian, author of the Repertorium Ecclesiasticum Parochiale Londinense, a history of the diocese of London.

== Life ==
Newcourt was the son of a topographical draughtsman, also called Richard Newcourt, who owned an estate at Somerton, Somerset. He attended Wadham College, Oxford, where he matriculated on 9 December 1653, but did not graduate. After university he became a notary public, and a clerk at the Court of Arches in London, the main consistory court of the Archbishop of Canterbury, becoming a Proctor-General of the court in (according to his own account) 1668. In 1669 he became principal registrar of the diocese of London, a post he held until 1696.

Using the records in his custody and other documents, Newcourt compiled a history of the diocese of London, which was published in two volumes in 1708 and 1710, under the title Repertorium Ecclesiasticum Parochiale Londinense: An Ecclesiastical Parochial History of the Diocese of London. The work recounts the history of St Paul's Cathedral, of the bishops and deans of London, and of the parishes in the diocese. His sources of information included the London Registers, which were begun in 1306, and registers kept by individual bishops. The incomes of the parishes were taken from a return made in 1636, the manuscript of which was then at Sion College. He also wrote a history of the bishops of England, which was not published.

He spent the last years of his life at Greenwich, and was buried at the parish church in February 1716. His wife had been interred there the previous month. He left his property to his sister, Mary Spicer.

A collection of Newcourt's papers, including drafts and notes for the first volume of the Repertorium Ecclesiasticum Parochiale Londinense was donated to the Guildhall Library in 1939, and is now in the London Metropolitan Archives.
