= Robert Chichester (died 1627) =

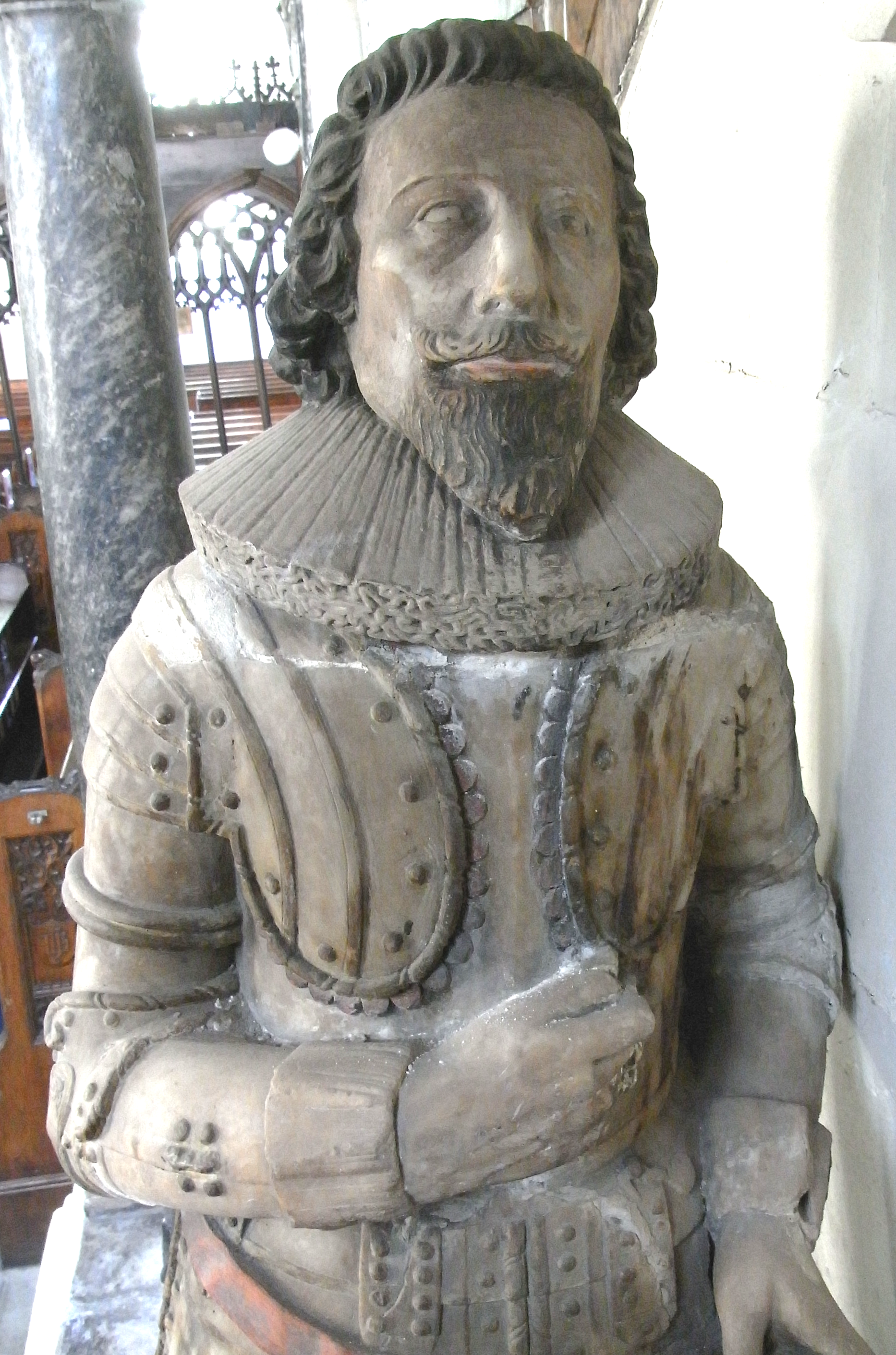
Effigy of Sir Robert Chichester in Pilton Church

Arms of Chichester: Chequy or and gules, a chief vair

Sir Robert Chichester (1578–1627), (KB), lord of the manor of Raleigh in the parish of Pilton in Devon, was Custos Rotulorum and Deputy Lieutenant of Devon.

== Biography ==
He was the eldest son and heir of Sir John Chichester (died 1586), of Raleigh, Sheriff of Devon in 1585, by his wife Ann Dennis, the eldest daughter of Sir Robert Dennis (died 1592), of Holcombe Burnell, in Devon.

He was a minor aged 8 at the death of his father in 1586 and went into wardship. He was appointed Knight of the Order of the Bath at the coronation of King James I in 1603. He was Custos Rotulorum and Deputy Lieutenant of Devon, and was Colonel of a Regiment of Foot, as is recorded on his monument in Pilton Church.

=== Marriages and children ===
Chichester married twice. His first wife was Frances Harington, one of the two daughters of John Harington, 1st Baron Harington (died 1613) of Exton in Rutland, and a co-heiress of her brother John Harington, 2nd Baron Harington of Exton (1592–1614). By her he had one daughter, Anne Chichester (died 1627), who became the first wife of Thomas Bruce, 1st Earl of Elgin (1599–1663). Anne died the day after having given birth to an only child Robert Bruce, 2nd Earl of Elgin, 1st Earl of Ailesbury (1626–1685). Her monument with sculpted recumbent effigy in marble survives in Exton Church.

His second wife was Mary Hill, a daughter of Robert Hill (died 1637) of Shilston in the parish of Modbury in Devon. She survived him and remarried to Sir Ralph Sydenham, who held on her behalf the Chichester manor of Shirwell, in which is situated the mansion house of Youlston. By his second wife he had two sons and one daughter (as is recorded on his monument in Pilton Church) including his eldest son and heir, Sir John Chichester, 1st Baronet (died 1667), of Raleigh, and Robert Chichester, second son.

=== Death and monument ===
Chichester died in 1627 aged 48. His elaborate monument survives in Pilton Church, showing his kneeling effigy dressed in armour, behind which kneel two young male children, and in front of which, separated by a prie dieu, kneel effigies of his two wives, behind whom kneels an adult daughter, Anne Chichester (Countess of Elgin). The monument is described by Pevsner as having an "odd feature" of a central column in front of the prie dieu which comes further forward than the side columns and "leads to awkward consequences in the entablature above". The base he describes as "eccentric", having a curved bottom supported by short marble columns. A black panel above is inscribed in gilt letters as follows:

In memory of S^{r} Robert Chichester Knig^{ht} of the Bath, Custos Rotulorum & Deputy Lieutenant of this shire & Colonel of a Regiment of Foot. He was a son of S^{r} John Chichester K^{t} by Anne daughter of S^{r} Robert Dennis of Holcomb. He married his first wife Frances daughter and co-heir of John Lord Harrington of Exton in Rutlandshire by whom he had issue Anne who became the wife of Thomas, Lord Bruce. S^{r} Robert married to his second wife a daughter of Robert Hill of Shilston in this county Esq^{r} by whom he had issue two sons and one daughter. He died 1627 aged 48.

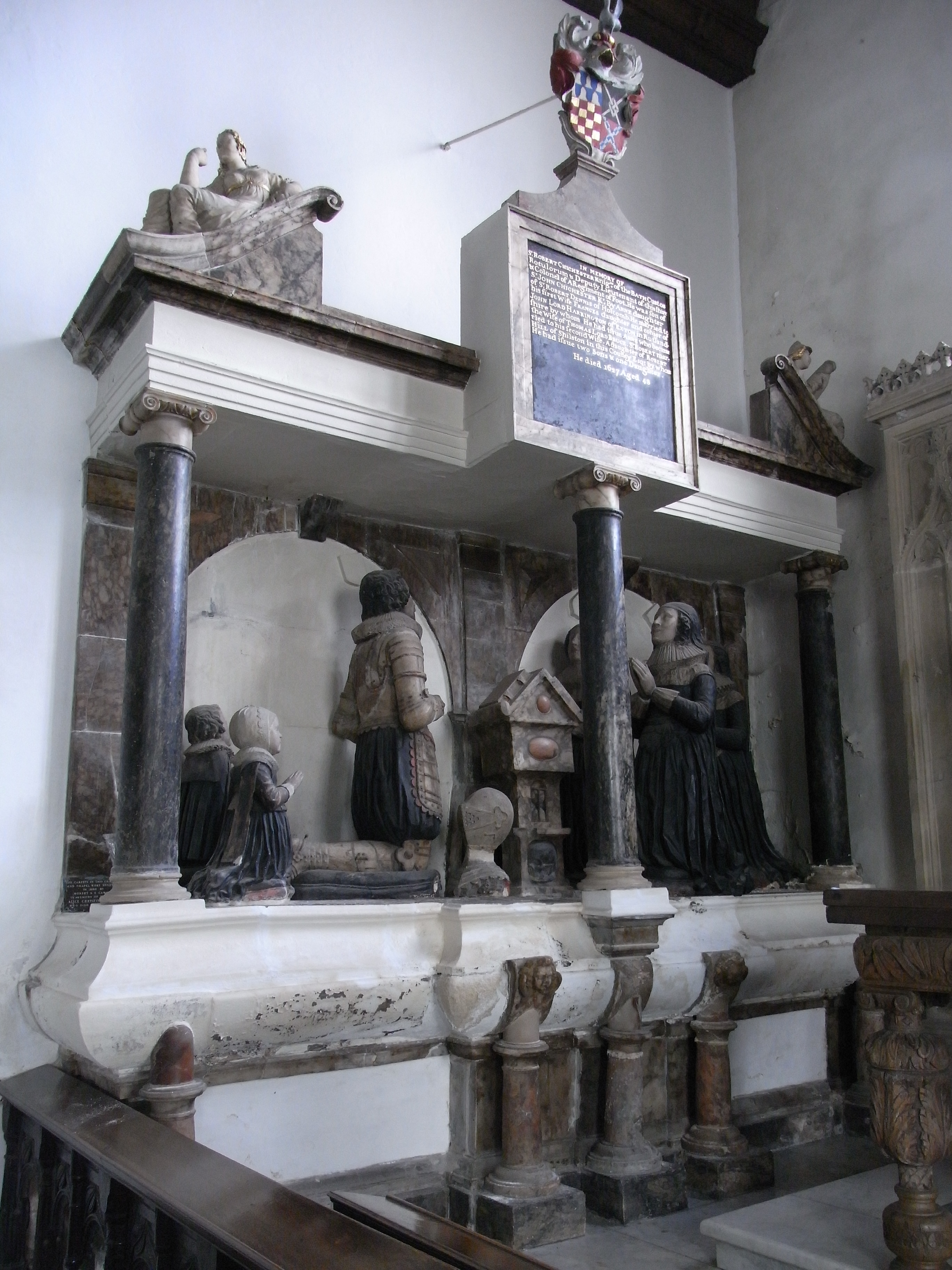
The monument to Chichester in Pilton Church

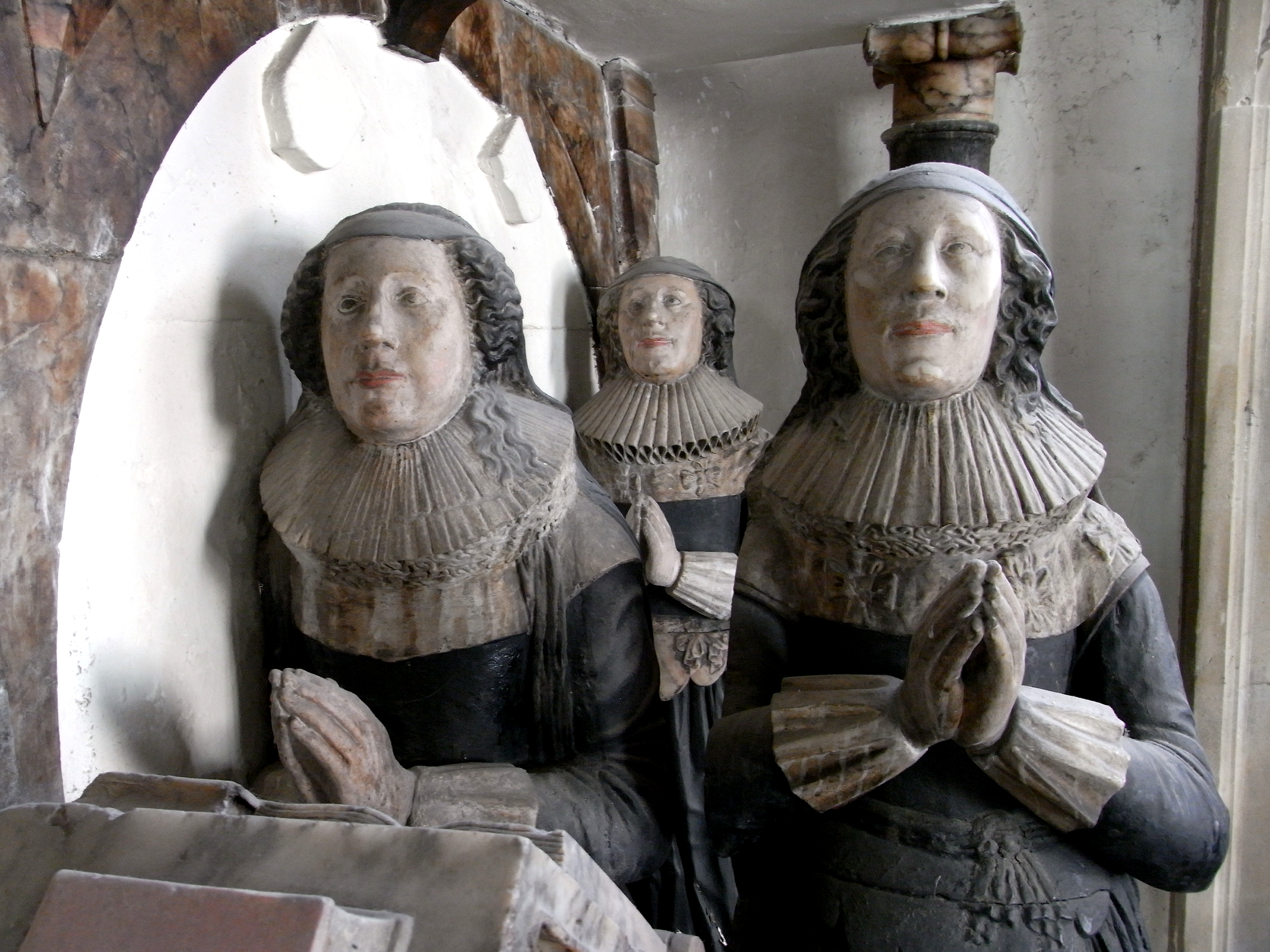
Chichester's two wives, and behind them his daughter Anne. Detail from his monument.

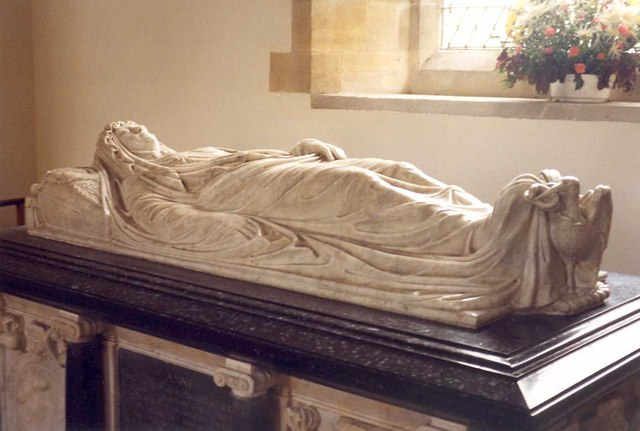
Effigy of Chichester's daughter Anne in the Church of St Peter and St Paul, Exton.
