= John Chichester =

John Chichester may refer to:

== Chichester of Raleigh, Devon, England ==
- Sir John Chichester (died 1569), of Raleigh, Sheriff of Devon
- Sir John Chichester (died 1586), Sheriff of Devon
- Sir John Chichester, 1st Baronet (1623–1667) of the Chichester baronets of Raleigh
- Sir John Chichester, 2nd Baronet (c. 1658–1680) of the Chichester baronets of Raleigh
- Sir John Chichester, 4th Baronet (1669–1740) of the Chichester baronets of Raleigh
- Sir John Chichester, 5th Baronet (1721–1784) of the Chichester baronets of Raleigh
- Sir John Chichester, 6th Baronet (c. 1752–1808) of the Chichester baronets of Raleigh
- Sir John Chichester, 11th Baronet of the Chichester baronets of Raleigh

== Other ==
- Sir John Chichester, 1st Baronet, of Arlington Court (c. 1794–1851), English Whig and Liberal politician
- John Chichester (American politician) (born 1937), American politician in Virginia
- Lord John Chichester (1811–1873), Anglo-Irish Member of Parliament
- John Chichester (d.1669) of Hall (1598–1669), Member of Parliament for Lostwithiel in Cornwall
