= John Chichester (died 1569) =

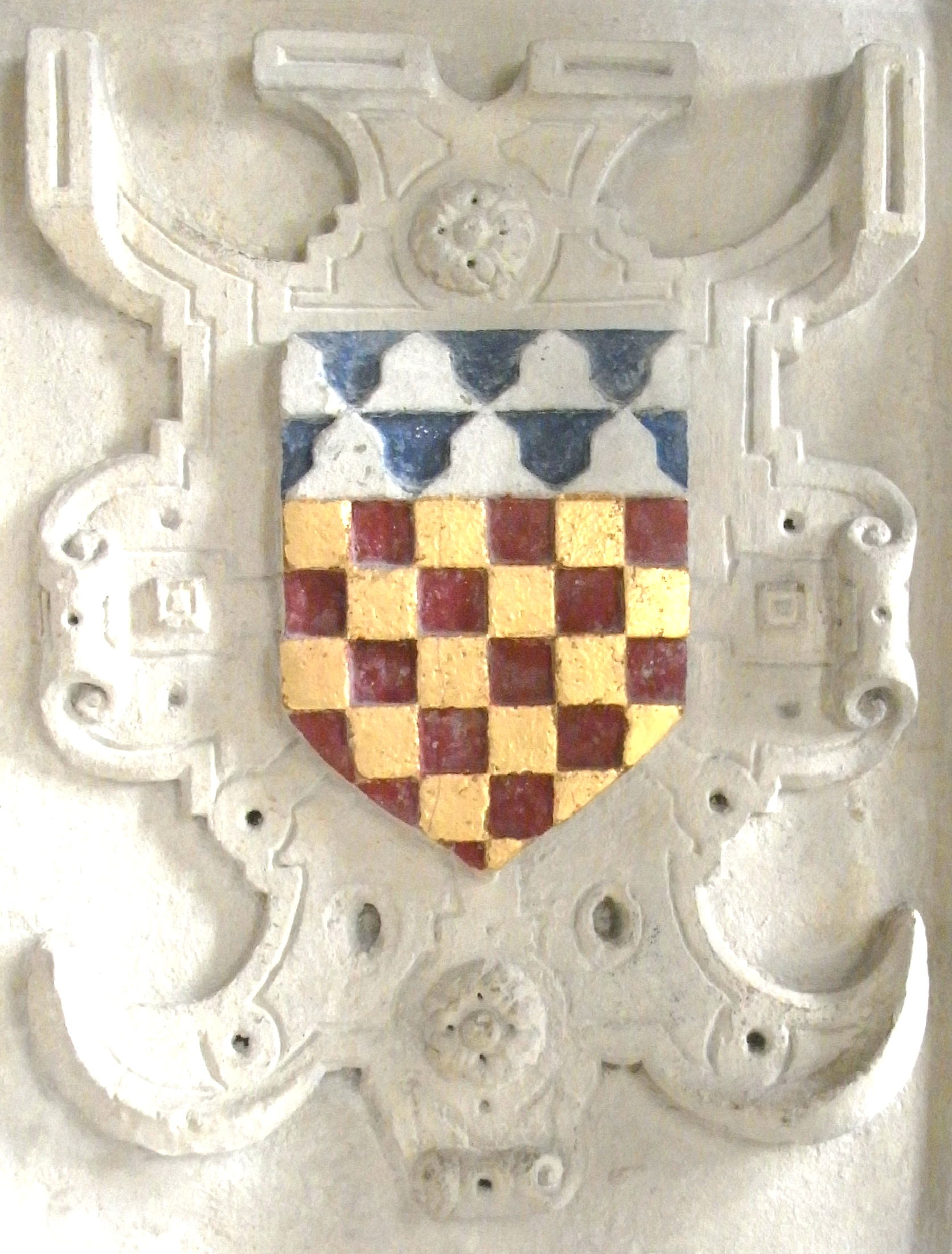
Arms of Sir John Chichester shown within a strapwork surround from his monument in Pilton Church: Chequy or and gules, a chief vair

Sir John Chichester (1519/20 – 1569) of Raleigh in the parish of Pilton, near Barnstaple in North Devon, was a leading member of the Devonshire gentry, a naval captain, and ardent Protestant who served as Sheriff of Devon in 1550-1551, and as Knight of the Shire for Devon in 1547, April 1554, and 1563, and as Member of Parliament for Barnstaple in 1559, over which borough his lordship of the manor of Raleigh, Pilton had considerable influence.

== Origins ==
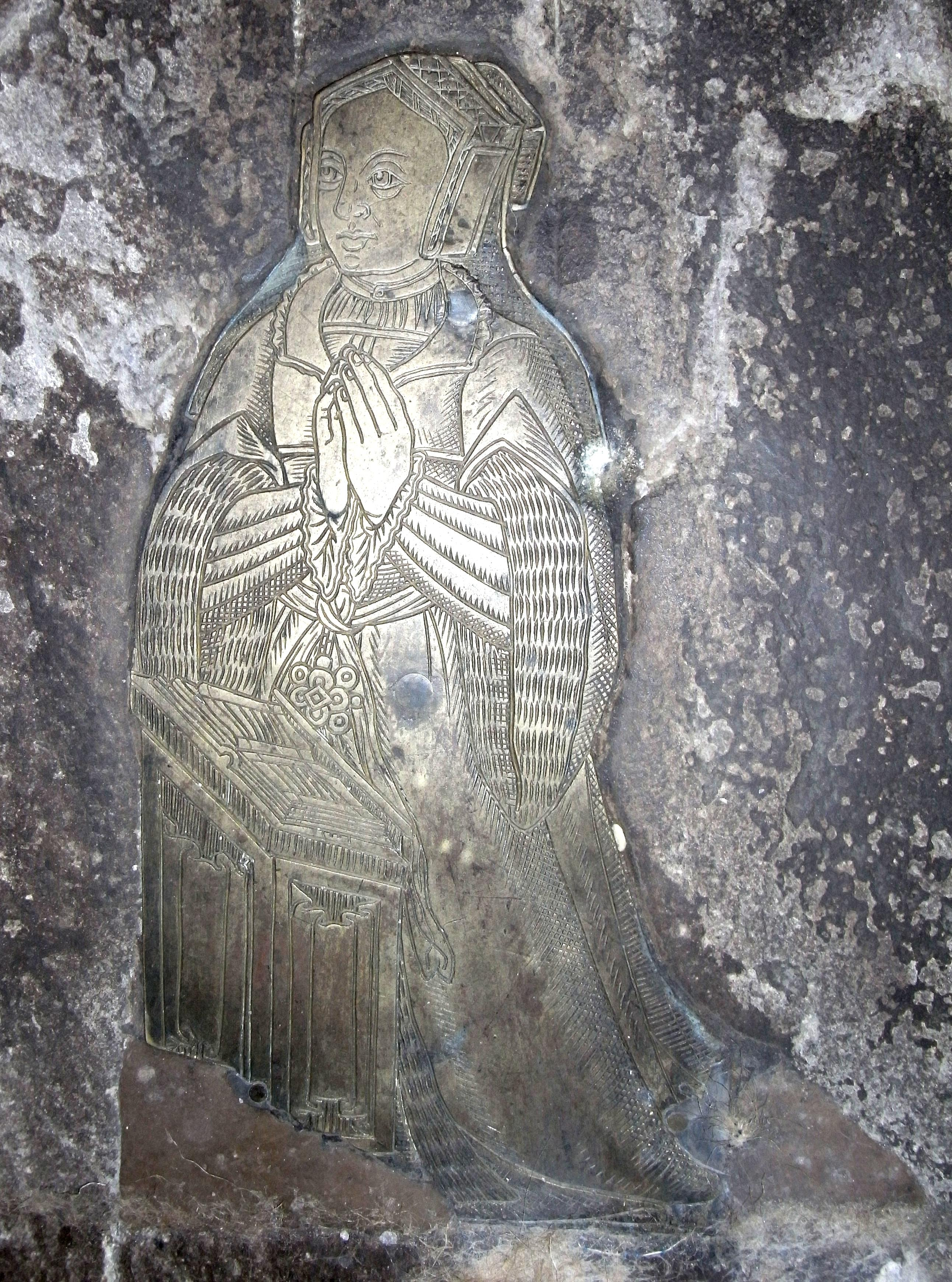
Small monumental brass (c. one ft high) in St Brannock's Church, Braunton, Devon, of Lady Elizabeth Bourchier (died 1548), daughter of John Bourchier, 1st Earl of Bath & wife of Edward Chichester (died 1522) of Raleigh, Pilton. She kneels at prayer before a prie dieu on which is an open book. Gothic text inscription under: "Here lyethe Lady Elyzabethe Bowcer daughter of John Erle of Bathe & sumtyme wyffe to Edwarde Chechester Esquyer the whyche Elyzabethe decessyd the XXXIIIth day of August in the yere of O_r Lorde God M Vc (i.e. 5*c) XLVIII apon whose soule God have m(er)cy". The brass is a palimpsest, engraved on the reverse is the face of a knight, with helmet unfinished, apparently containing an artistic error which led to its abandonment & reuse

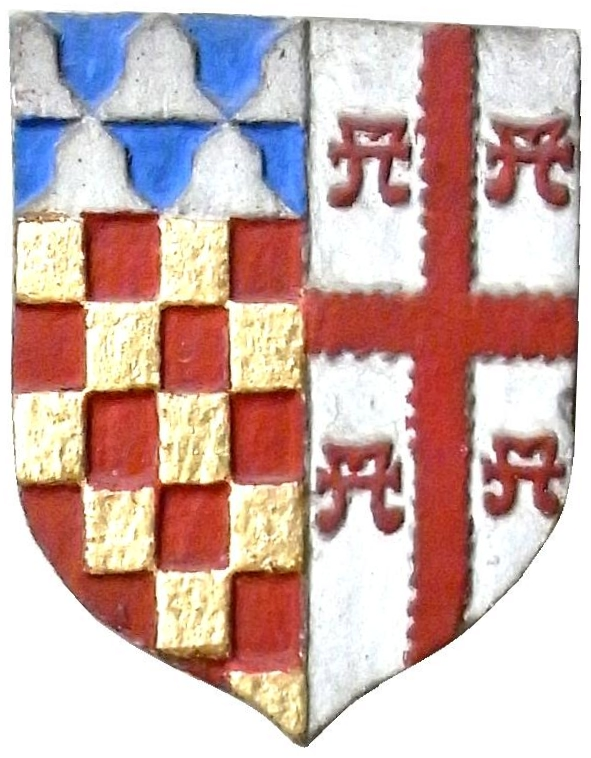
Heraldic escutcheon on the monument to Sir John Chichester (died 1569) of Raleigh in Pilton Church, Devon. Showing arms of Chichester impaling Bourchier (Argent, a cross engrailed gules between four water bougets sable, here restored incorrectly as gules), representing the marriage of his parents

The Chichester family had been seated at the manor of Raleigh since the mid-14th. century. He was the son of Edward Chichester (died 27 July 1526) of Great Torrington, who predeceased his own father, also Sir John (1474-1537), by his wife Lady Elizabeth Bourchier (died 1548), whose small monumental brass exists in St Brannock's Church, Braunton, a daughter of John Bourchier, 1st Earl of Bath (1470–1539) whose seat was at Tawstock Court, 3 miles south of Raleigh. In the 16th and 17th centuries these two houses, Raleigh and the new Tawstock Court built in 1574, were probably the largest in North Devon. He succeeded his grandfather in 1536.

== Career ==
As a young man he served in the Royal Navy, and in 1544 he was with King Henry VIII in France at the Siege of Boulogne. In 1545 he was captain of the ship Struce of Dansick under the command of Sir George Carew, a fellow Devonian. He was in London on the outbreak of the Western Rebellion in 1549, and set off back to Devon to fight for the royalist forces under the command of John Russell, 1st Baron Russell, who was probably responsible for recommending him to the king for Sheriff of Devon in 1550-1. As an expression of royal gratitude, Russell awarded Chichester jointly with Sir Arthur Champernon, the metal clappers which had been removed by royal command from Devon churchbells to prevent their being rung out by the rebels as calls to arms.

Following the death of King Henry VIII in 1547 he became an ardent supporter of the Duke of Somerset, the uncle of Henry's infant son King Edward VI, as Lord Protector. When Somerset was overthrown in 1551, Chichester was one of those temporarily imprisoned with him in the Tower of London.

When King Edward VI died in 1553, Chichester refused to support the Duke of Northumberland, Somerset's successor as Edward's chief minister, particularly not Northumberland's efforts to have his daughter-in-law Lady Jane Grey proclaimed Queen. He joined his cousin John Bourchier, 2nd Earl of Bath in being amongst the first to defy Northumberland by proclaiming Queen Mary I as monarch. The queen rewarded Chichester with a knighthood, which he received three days before the opening of the first parliament of her reign in 1553.

In 1555 he accompanied Francis Russell, 2nd Earl of Bedford on an embassy to the Imperial court at Brussels, and went on with him as far as Venice. Chichester was arrested in 1556 for his involvement in the Dudley conspiracy against Queen Mary and was again imprisoned in the Tower of London. He was soon released although remained under various restrictive controls.

After the death of Queen Mary and the accession of Queen Elizabeth I in 1558, Chichester returned to active local and national political activity until his death in 1569. In April 1558 he was commissioned to command the Militia of the Hundreds of North Devonshire. In 1566 he assigned to the Mayor, Corporation and Burgesses of Barnstaple all his rights and interests in the Manor of Barnstaple.

== Marriage and children ==
Arms of Courtenay of Powderham: Or, three torteaux a label azure

He married Gertrude Courtenay, a daughter of Sir William III Courtenay (1477–1535) "The Great", of Powderham, Devon, MP for Devon in 1529, thrice Sheriff of Devon, in 1522, 1525-6, 1533-4, an Esquire of the Body to King Henry VIII, whom he accompanied to the Field of the Cloth of Gold. He was 6th in descent from Hugh Courtenay, 2nd Earl of Devon (died 1377), and his own grandson William Courtenay (1527–1557) of Powderham became himself de jure 2nd Earl of Devon under the 1553 creation of that title. The arms of Courtenay quartered with Redvers appear amongst the many heraldic escutcheons shown on Chichester's monument in Pilton Church. He had by her seven sons and nine daughters, who married into many of the leading gentry families of Devonshire, two of them marrying children of first cousins of Lady Jane Grey (1536/1537-1554), The Queen of Nine Days. The marriages of his children are represented heraldically on a panel on his monument in Pilton Church.

=== Heraldic Panel ===
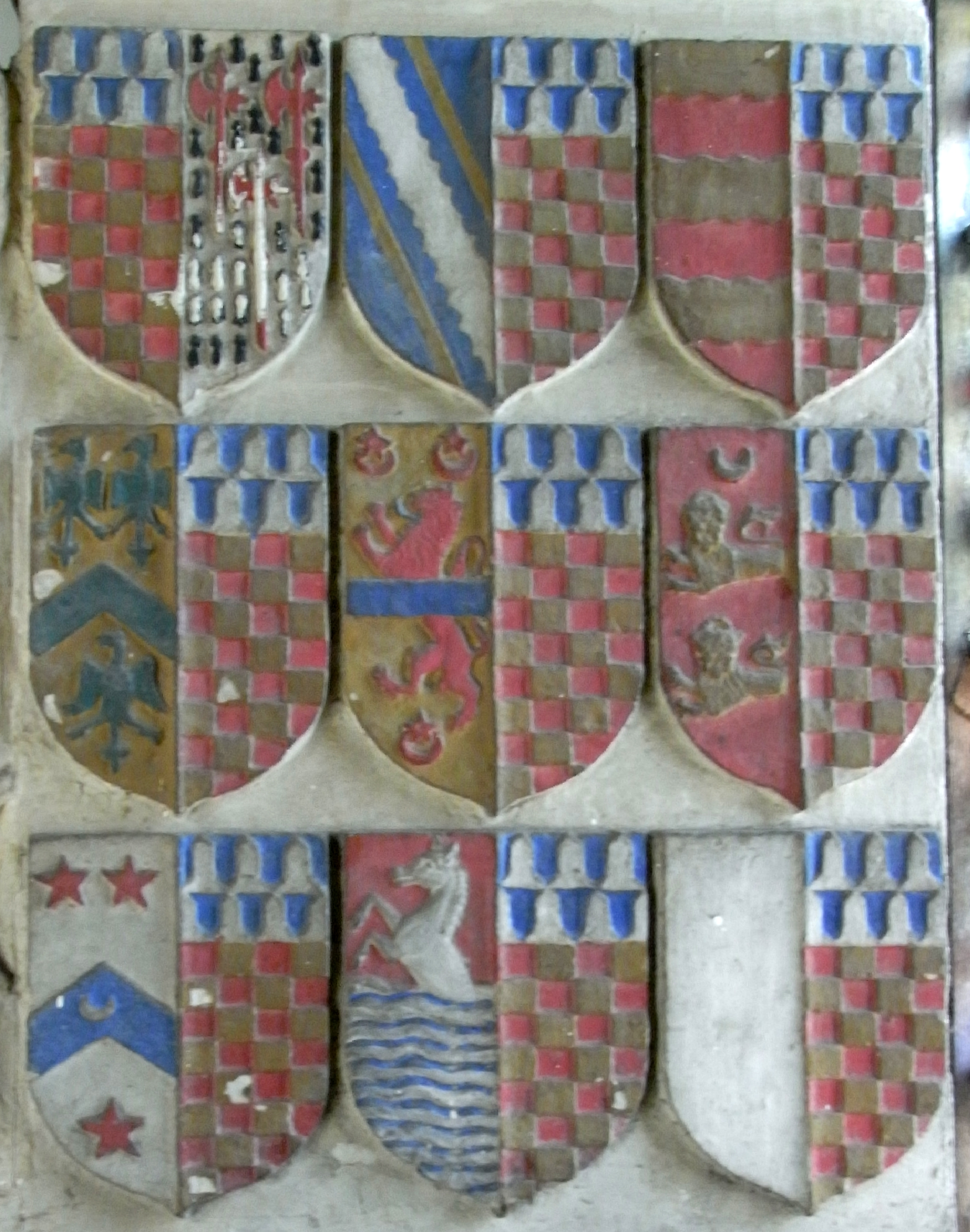
Heraldic panel on monument to Sir John Chichester (died 1569) in Pilton Church, showing his children and their marriage alliances

A heraldic panel from high up on the right side of the monument to Sir John Chichester (died 1569) in Pilton Church shows his children and their marriage alliances. The first (leftmost, top row) representing the marriage of his eldest son and heir, shows Chichester impaling the Danish battle-axes of Denys of Holcombe Burnell. The remaining shields are all those of his daughters, with the arms of Chichester being impaled by the arms of the husband of each: l to r:

row 1
Denys, Fortescue, Basset
row 2
Bluett, Dillon, Hatch of Aller (Gules, two demi-lions passant guardant or)
row 3
Pollard, Trevelyan of Nettlecombe (Gules, the base barry wavy argent and azure, a demi-horse issuant of the second maned and hoofed or), (blank)

=== Sons ===
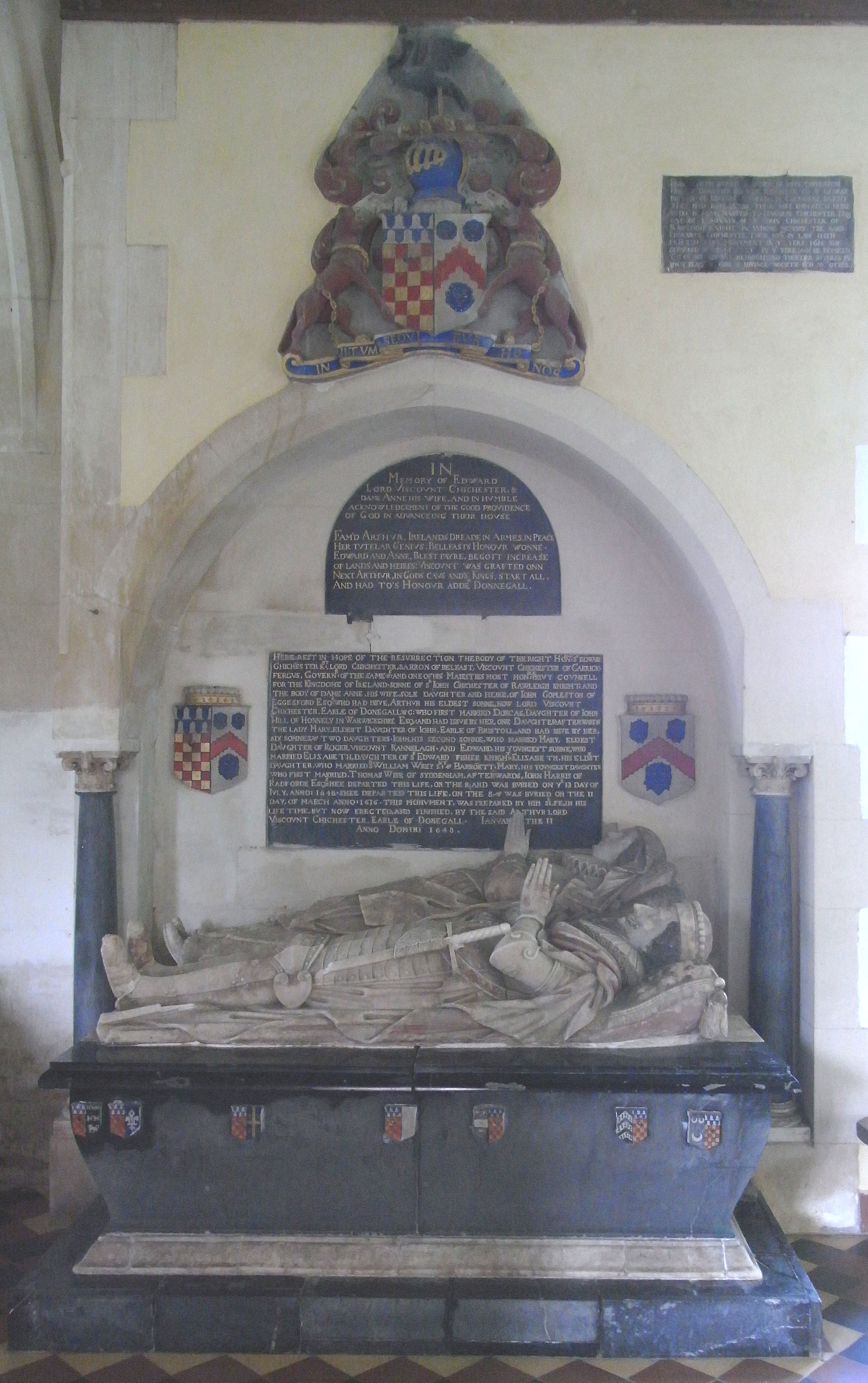
Monument in Eggesford Church of Edward Chichester, 1st Viscount Chichester of Carickfergus (1568–1648) and his wife Anne Copleston (1588–1616)

He had the following 7 sons:

- Sir John Chichester, senior (died 31 March 1586), eldest son and heir, of Raleigh, who married Ann Dennis, the eldest daughter of Sir Robert Dennis (died 1592), of Holcombe Burnell, in Devon, by his wife Mary Blount who was one of the two daughters and co-heiresses of William Blount, 4th Baron Mountjoy (c. 1478–1534), KG, and a first cousin of Queen Lady Jane Grey.
- Arthur Chichester, 1st Baron Chichester of Belfast (1563-1624/5), 2nd son, who succeeded his brother Sir John as Governor of Carrickfergus.
- Edward Chichester, 1st Viscount Chichester (1568–1648), 3rd son, of Eggesford, Devon, whose recumbent effigy survives in Eggesford Church.
- Charles Chichester, 4th son, died childless.
- Sir John Chichester, junior, 5th son. He was Governor of Carrickfergus, County Antrim, Ireland, and was captured and beheaded by Randal MacSorley Macdonnell. He died childless.
- Sir Thomas Chichester, 6th son
- Adrian Chichester, 7th son, died childless.

=== Daughters ===
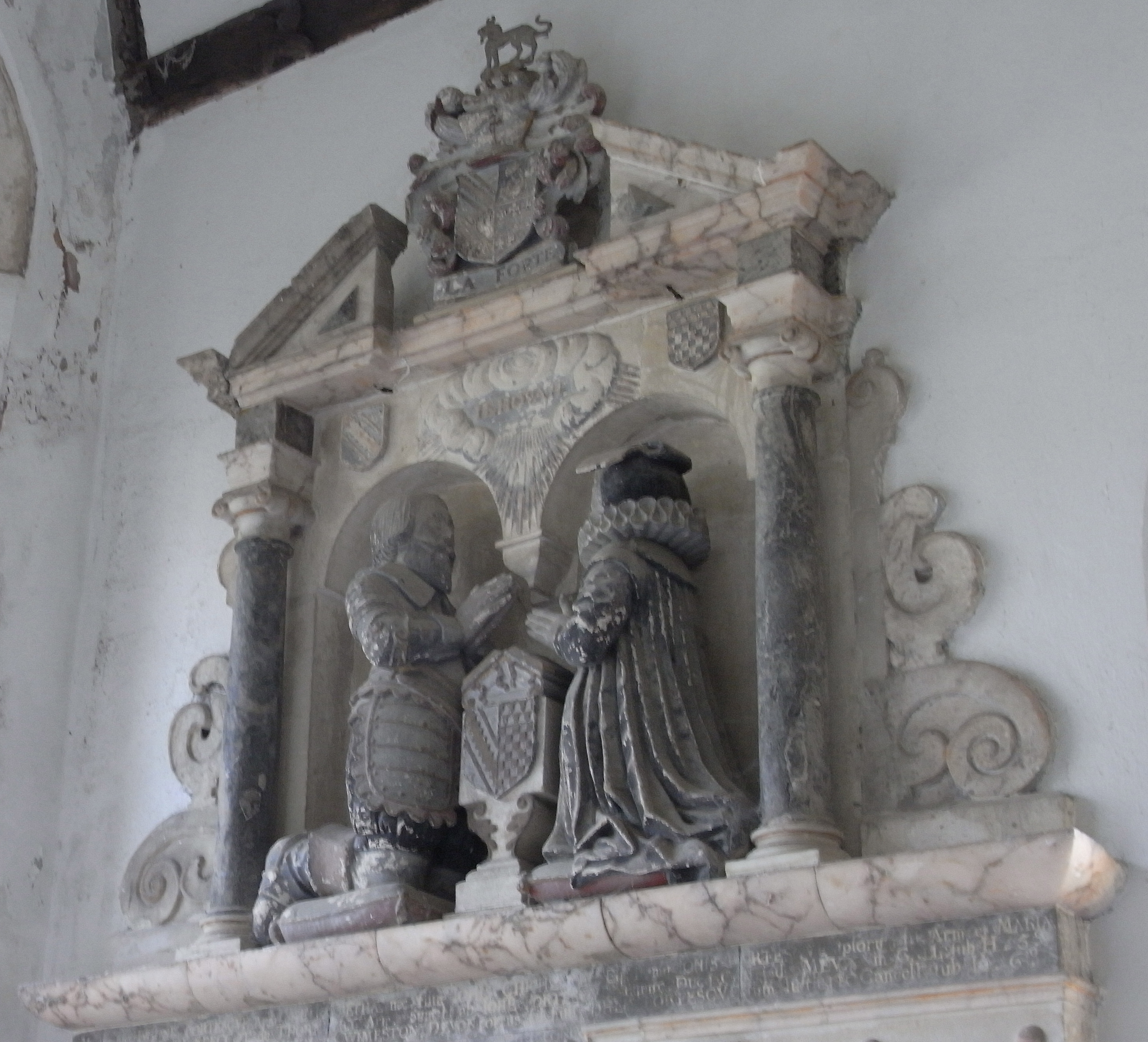
Hugh Fortescue (1544–1600) and his wife Elizabeth Chichester (died 1630), daughter of Sir John Chichester (died 1569), top row of 1638 Fortescue mural monument in Weare Giffard Church. On the side of the prie-dieu is an escutcheon showing the arms of Fortescue (Azure, a bend engrailled argent cotised or) impaling Chichester
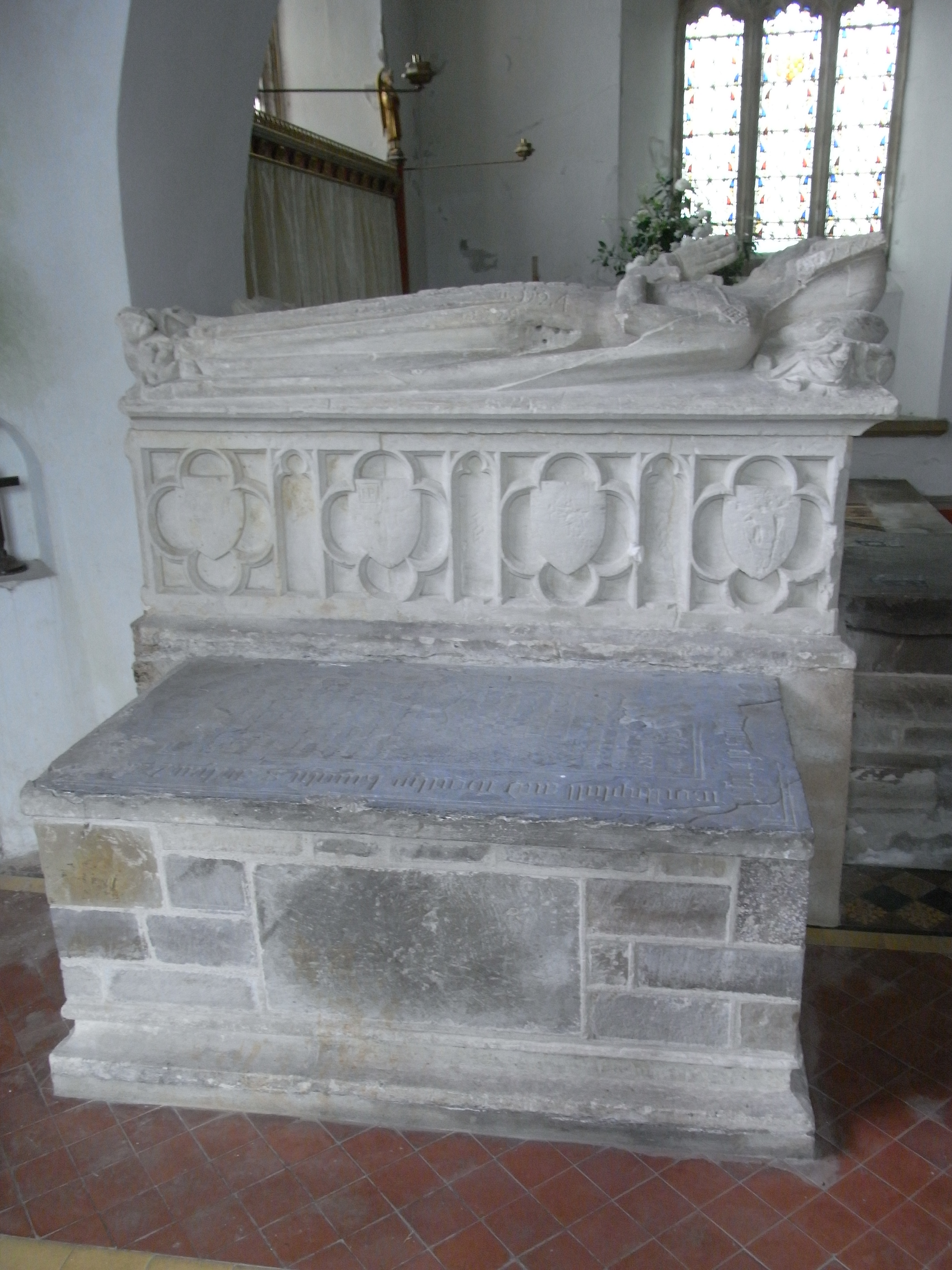
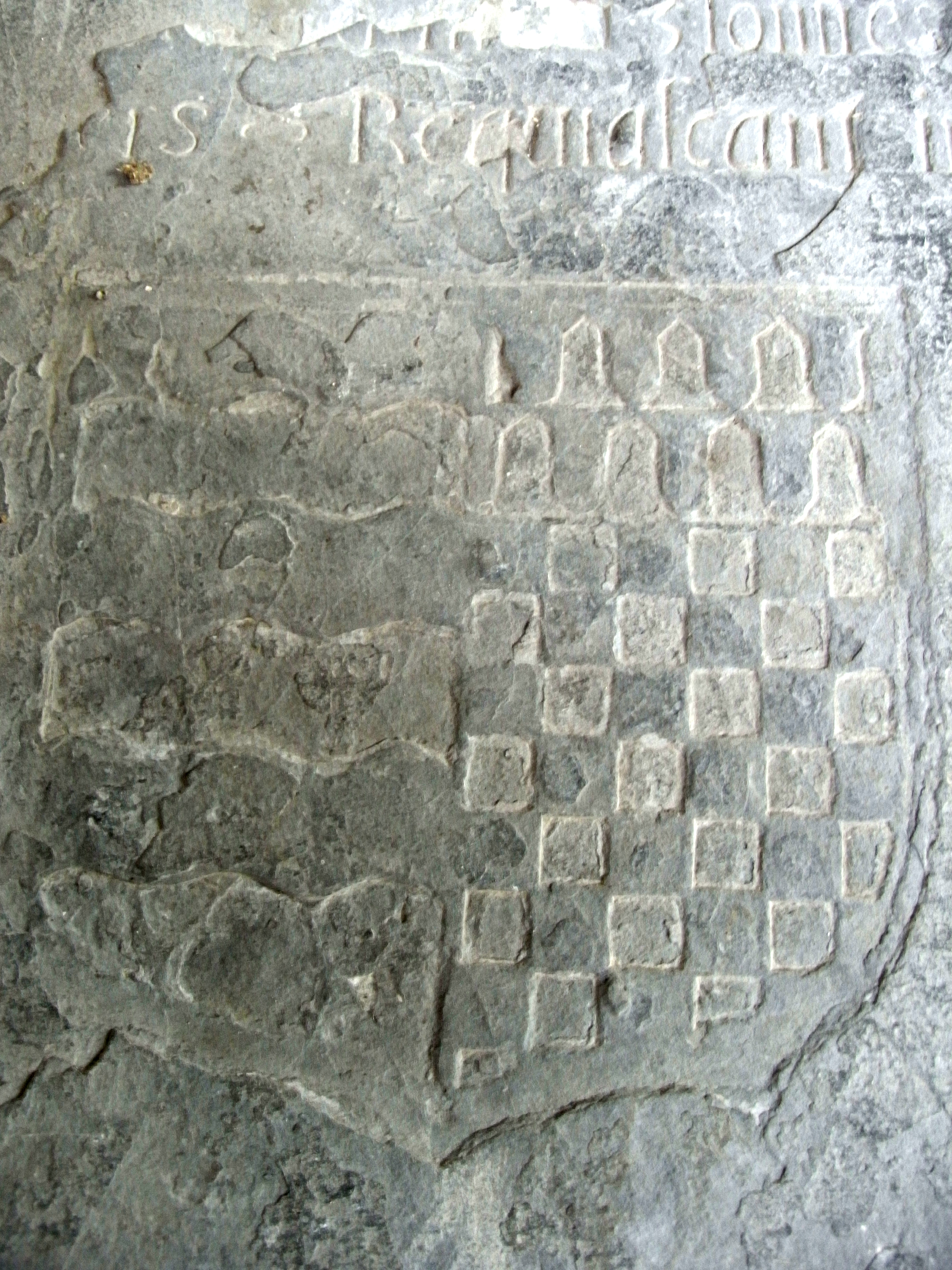
Small chest tomb (foreground) in Atherington Church, Devon, of Sir Arthur Basset (1541–1586) of Umberleigh and his wife Eleanor Chichester, daughter of Sir John Chichester (died 1569) of Raleigh. Slate slab on top shows arms of Basset, Barry wavy of six or and gules, impaling Chichester

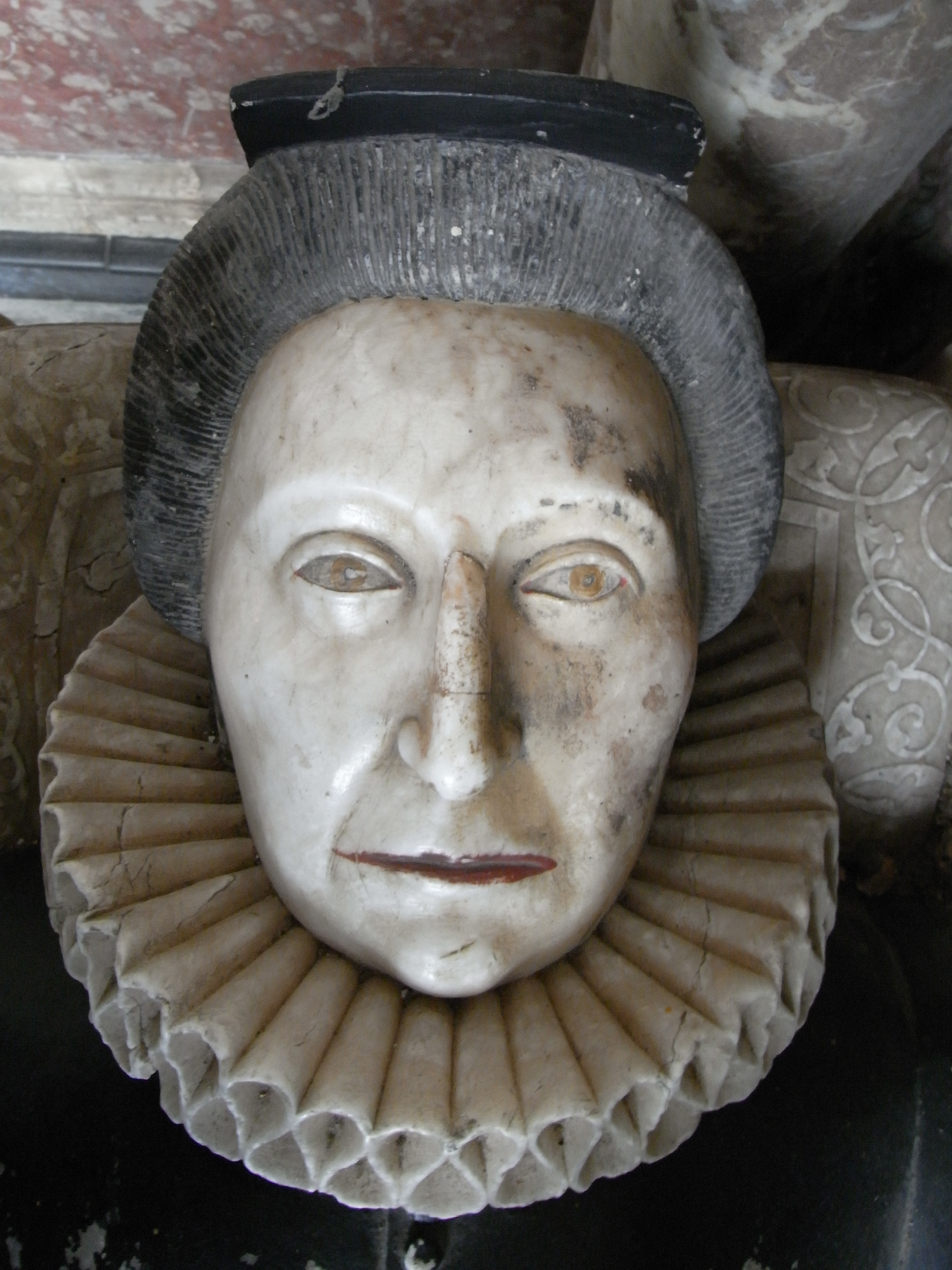
Mary Chichester (died 1613), wife of Richard Bluett Esq. (died 1614) of Holcombe Rogus. Detail from her effigy on the couple's monument in All Saints Church, Holcombe Rogus

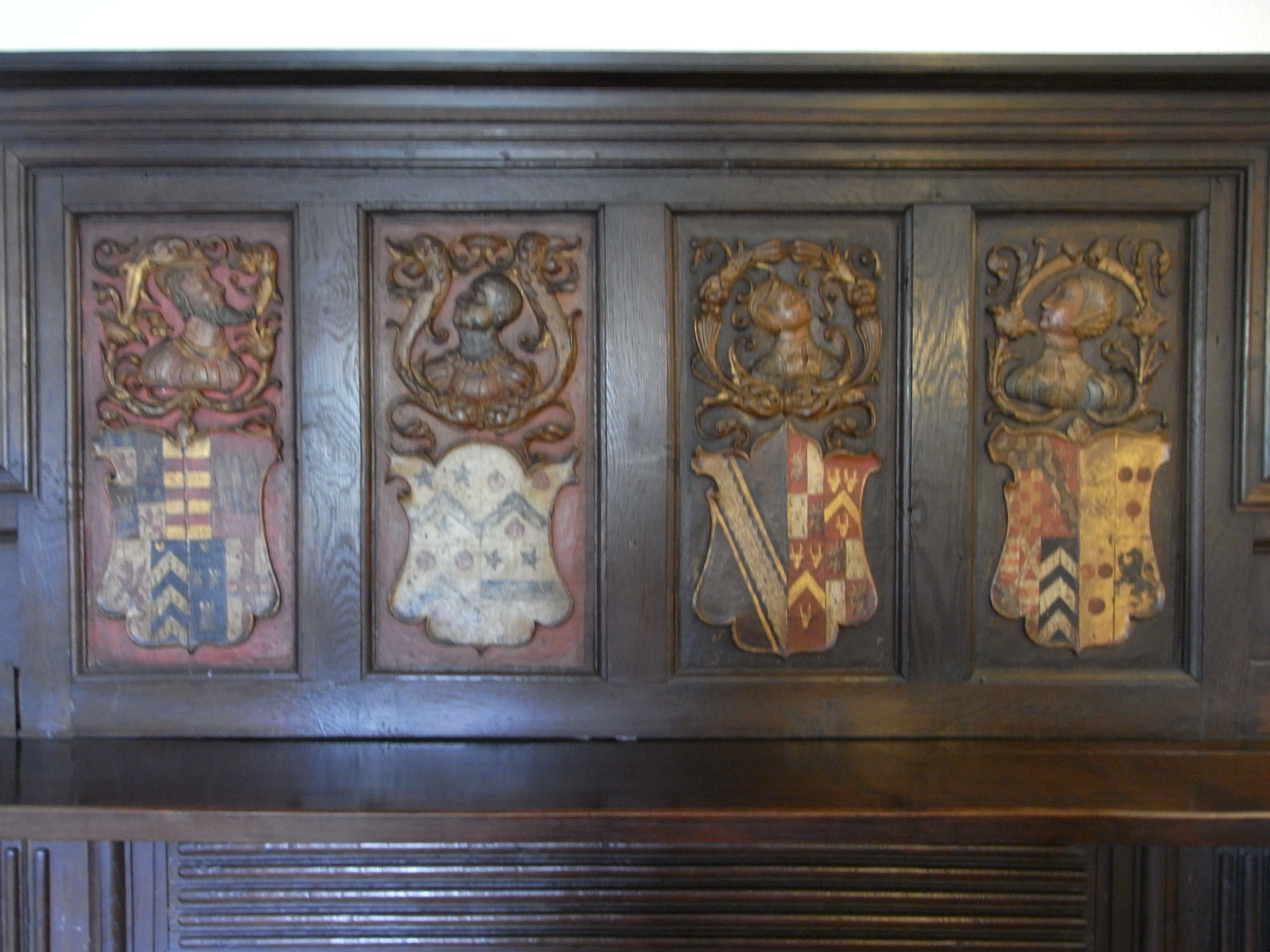
Far right: 16th century escutcheon showing the quartered arms of Sir John Chichester (quarterly of 4: Chichester, Raleigh, Beaumont quartering Willington, Wise), impaling Courtenay quartering Redvers. Chimney-piece in Simonsbath House, having been moved there in the early 20th century by the Fortescue family from their seat at Weare Giffard Hall. Hugh Fortescue (1544–1600) of Weare Giffard married Elizabeth Chichester (died 1630), a daughter of Sir John Chichester by his wife Gertrude Courtenay

- Elizabeth Chichester (died 1630), married Hugh Fortescue (1544–1600), Sheriff of Devon in 1583, eldest son of Richard Fortescue (c. 1517 – 1570) of Weare Giffard and of Filleigh, ancestor of the Earls Fortescue. Effigies of the couple facing each other kneeling can be seen on the top tier of the mural monument in Weare Giffard Church erected by their grandson Hugh Fortescue (1592–1661). A 16th century escutcheon showing the quartered arms of her father, John Chichester (quarterly of 4: Chichester, Raleigh, Beaumont quartering Willington, Wise), impaling Courtenay quartering Redvers, survives on a chimney-piece in Simonsbath House, having been moved there in the early 20th century by the Fortescue family from their seat at Weare Giffard Hall.
- Cecilia Chichester, married Thomas Hatch
- Eleanor Chichester (died 1585), married Sir Arthur Bassett (1541–1586), MP, of Umberleigh and Heanton Punchardon, MP for Barnstaple in 1563 and for Devon in 1572. He was the son of John Basset (son of Sir John Bassett (1462–1529) Sheriff of Devon in 1524) by his wife Frances Plantagenet, one of the three daughters and co-heiresses of Arthur Plantagenet, 1st Viscount Lisle (died 1542), an illegitimate son of King Edward IV. The couple's chest tomb with arms of Basset impaling Chichester on the slab-top exists in Atherington Church, in the parish of which is situated the manor of Umberleigh. The tomb was moved from the Basset Chapel which formerly existed next to Umberleigh House.
- Mary Chichester (died 1613), who married Richard Bluett (died 1614) of Holcombe Rogus, Devon, son of John Bluett of Holcombe Rogus by his wife Dorothy Blount (a first cousin of Lady Jane Grey), one of the two daughters and co-heiresses of William Blount, 4th Baron Mountjoy (c. 1478 – 1534), KG, and his wife Dorothy Grey, daughter of Thomas Grey, 7th Baron Ferrers of Groby, 1st Earl of Huntingdon, 1st Marquess of Dorset (1455–1501), KG, father of Henry Grey, 1st Duke of Suffolk, 3rd Marquess of Dorset (1517–1554), KG, and grandfather of Lady Jane Grey. The couple are represented as effigies on their monument in the Bluett Chapel, All Saints Church, Holcombe Rogus.
- Grace Chichester, married Robert Dillon of Farthington, Northamptonshire, son and heir of Henry Dillon of Bratton Fleming by his wife Elizabeth Pollard, daughter of Sir Hugh Pollard of Kings Nympton.
- Dorothy Chichester, married Sir Hugh Pollard of King's Nympton, son and heir of Sir Lewis II Pollard of Kings Nympton.
- Urith Chichester, married John Trevelyan of Nettlecombe in Somerset.
- Bridget Chichester, married (as his first wife) Sir Edmund Prideaux, 1st Baronet (died 1628) of Netherton, Farway, Devon.
- Susannah Chichester, who in 1584 married (as his 2nd wife) John Fortescue (d.1604), of Buckland Filleigh in Devon (3rd cousin of her sister's husband Hugh Fortescue (1545-1600) of Weare Gifford and Filleigh), by whom she had a son Sir Faithful Fortescue (1585-1666). Faithful Fortescue followed his uncle Arthur Chichester, 1st Baron Chichester of Belfast, to Ireland, where he had a distinguished military career and where he founded his own branch of the Fortescue family, who in the 18th century were created Earls of Clermont in the Peerage of Ireland.

== Death and burial ==
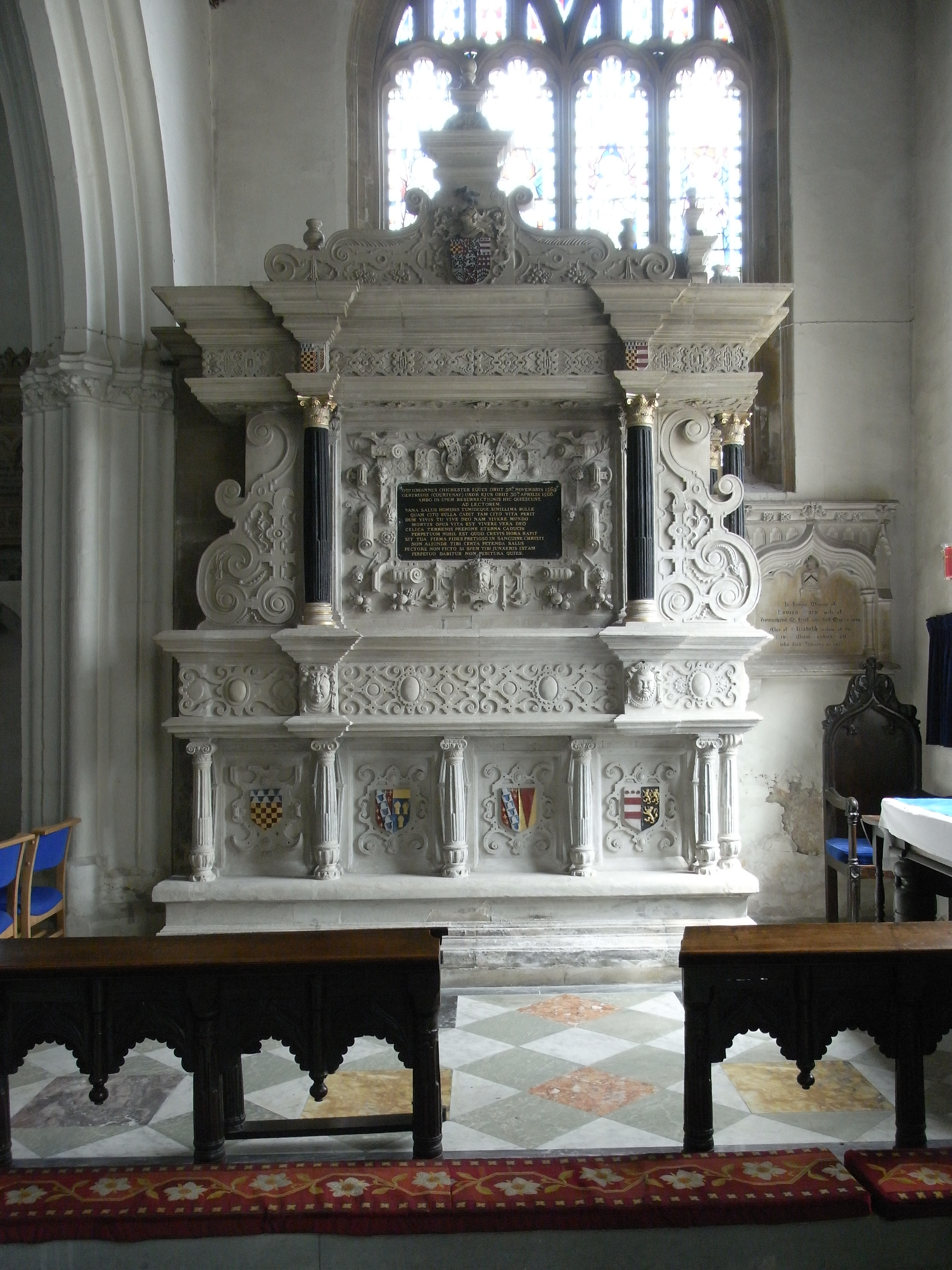
Monument to Sir John Chichester (died 1569), Raleigh Chapel in Church of St Mary the Virgin, Pilton, Devon

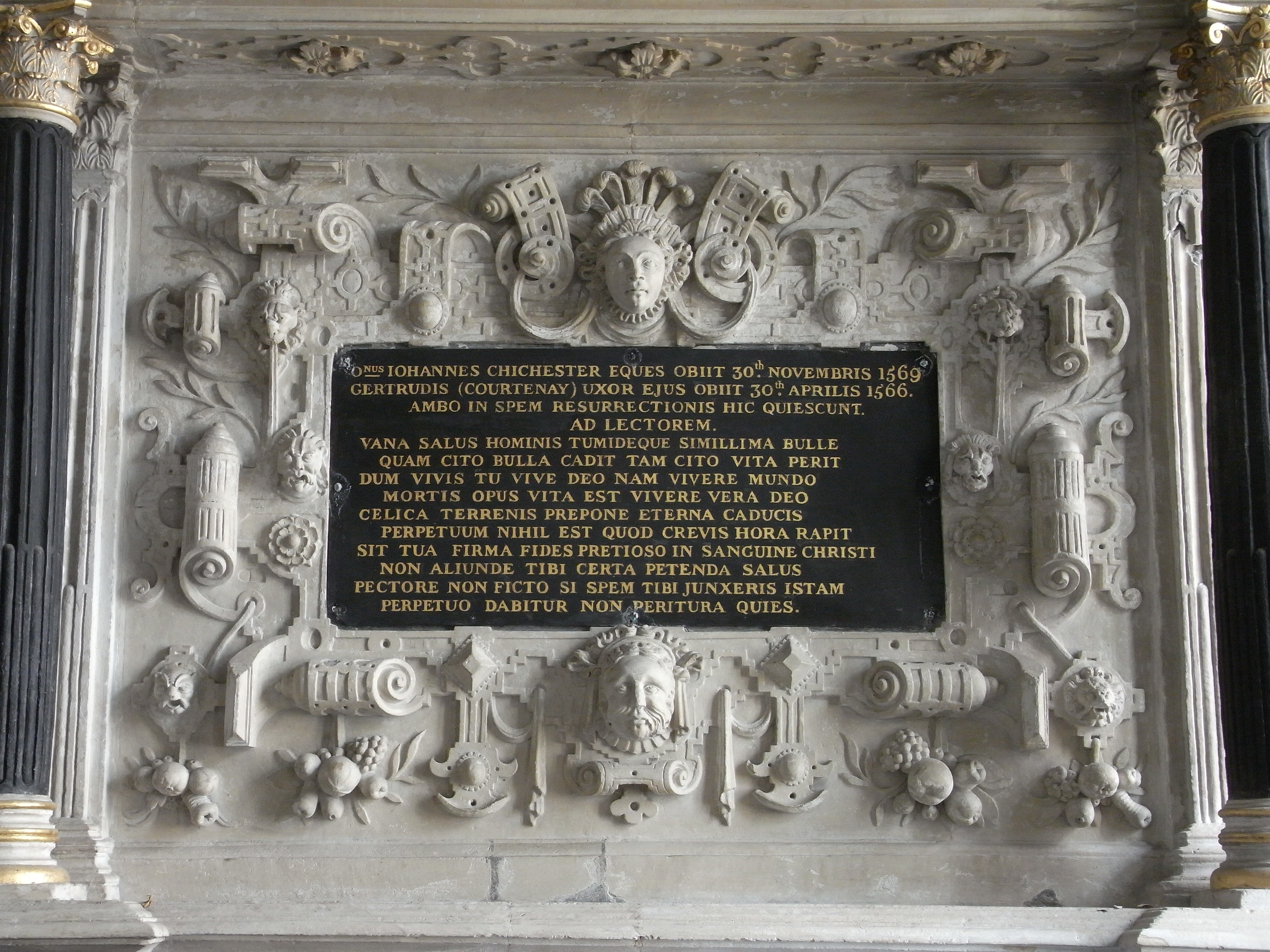
Latin inscription on Monument to Sir John Chichester (died 1569), Raleigh Chapel in Church of St Mary the Virgin, Pilton, Devon

Sir John Chichester died on 30 November 1569, and was buried in Pilton Church, in the parish of which, near Barnstaple in Devon, was situated his manor of Raleigh.

=== Monument in Pilton Church ===
A highly ornate monument exists against the east wall of the Raleigh Chapel in the Church of St Mary the Virgin in Pilton. It is decorated profusely with strapwork, but includes no effigy. On a tablet placed in its centre is inscribed the following Latin text:

O.nus Johannes Chichester Eques obiit 30th (sic) Novembris 1569. Gertrudis (Courtenay) uxor eius obiit 30th (sic) Aprilis 1566. Ambo in spem Resurrectionis hic quiescunt. Ad lectorem:
Vana salus hominis tumideque simillima bulle,
Quam cito bulla cadit tam cito vita perit,
Dum vivis tu vive deo nam vivere mundo,
Mortis opus vita est vivere vera deo,
Celica terrenis prepone eterna caducis,
Perpetuum nihil est quod crevis hora rapit,
Sit tua firma fides pretioso in sanguine Christi,
Non aliunde tibi certa petenda salus,
Pectore non ficto si spem tibi junxeris istam,
Perpetuo dabitur non peritura quies.

Which may be translated literally as:

"John Chichester, knight, died the 30th of November 1569. Gertrude Courtenay his wife died the 30th of April 1566. Both rest here in hope of the Resurrection. To the reader:
The health of man is most like an empty and swollen bubble,
As quickly as the bubble falls so quickly perishes life,
Whilst you are alive live you in God! for to live in the world,
Life is the work of death to live in God is true life,
Place eternal heavenly things before perishable earthly ones,
Nothing is forever, what you grow the hour snatches away,
Let your faith be strong in the precious blood of Christ,
It is not fitting for you to seek sure health elsewhere,
Not with a brave look if you shall join to yourself that hope,
Rest not about to perish shall be given in perpetuity".

== Sources ==
- Hawkyard, A.D.K., Biography of Sir John Chichester, published in History of parliament: House of Commons 1509-1558, Bindoff, S.T. (Ed.), London, 1982
- Chichester, Sir Alexander Bruce Palmer, Bart., History of the Family of Chichester from AD 1086 to 1870, published 1870, quoted in leaflet in Pilton Church. The author was Sir Alexander Palmer Bruce Chichester, 2nd Baronet (1842–1881), of the Chichester baronets, 1840 creation of Arlington Court.
- Col Henry Walrond, Historical Records of the 1st Devon Militia (4th Battalion The Devonshire Regiment), With a Notice of the 2nd and North Devon Militia Regiments, London: Longmans, 1897/Andesite Press, 2015, ISBN 978-1-37617881-4.
