= Church of St Mary the Virgin, Pilton =

Church in Devon, England

Coordinates: 51°05′18″N 4°03′45″W

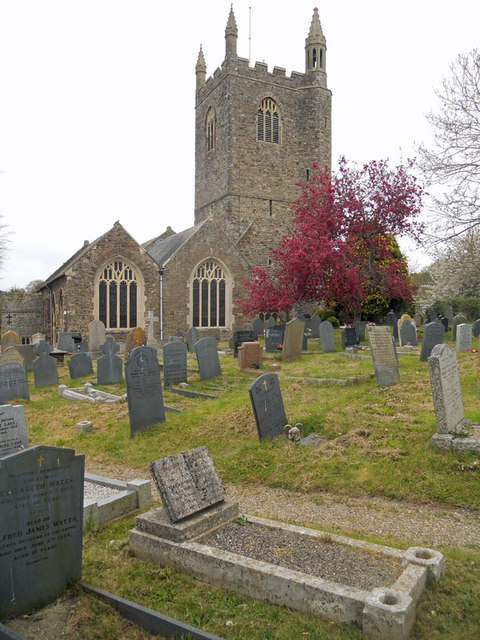
Church of St Mary the Virgin in Pilton in Devon

The Church of St Mary the Virgin in Pilton is the 13th-century Anglican parish church for the Pilton suburb of Barnstaple in Devon. It has been a Grade I listed building since 1951 and comes under the Diocese of Exeter.

== History and exterior ==
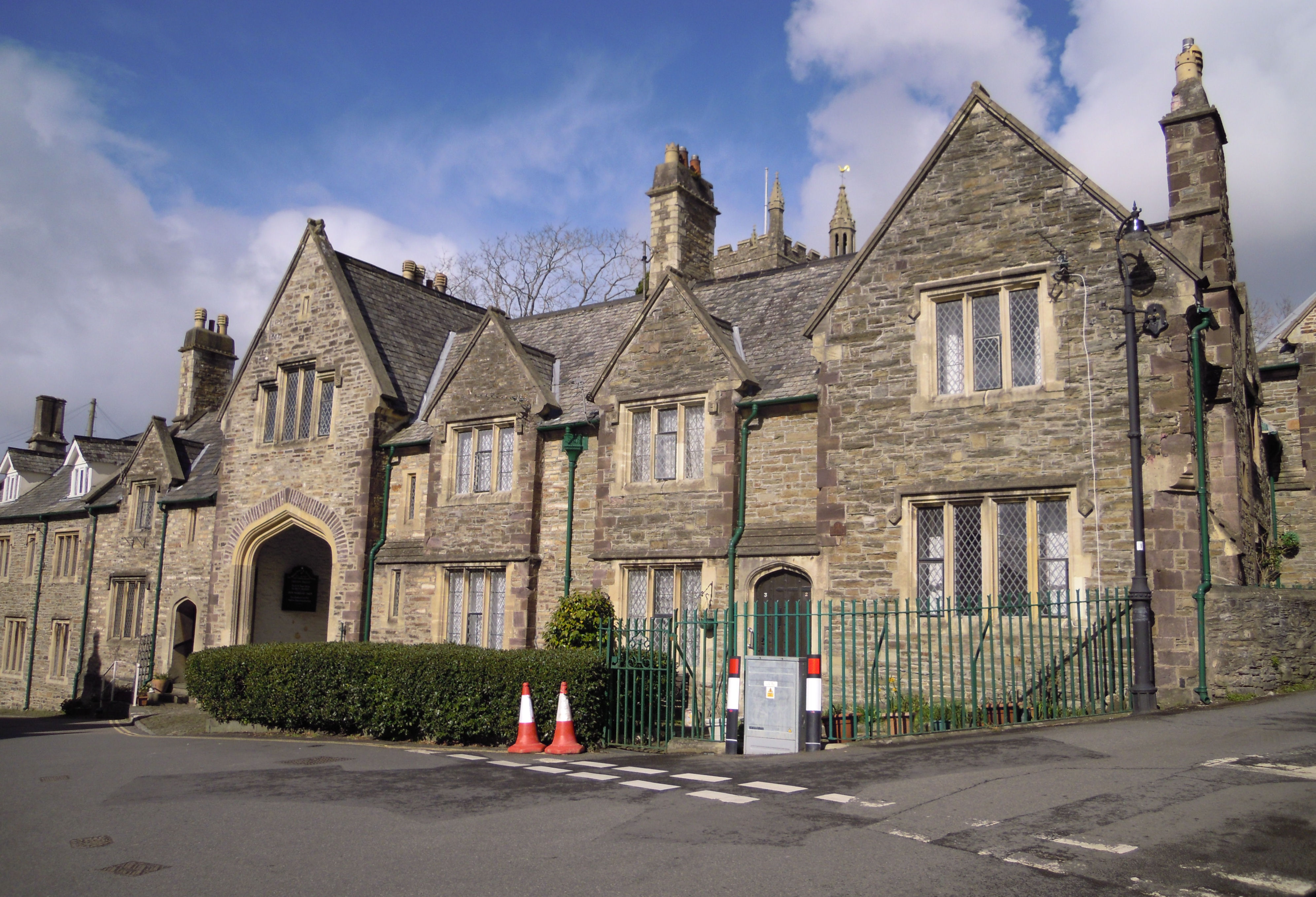
The mock-Tudor almhouses leading to the church date from 1849

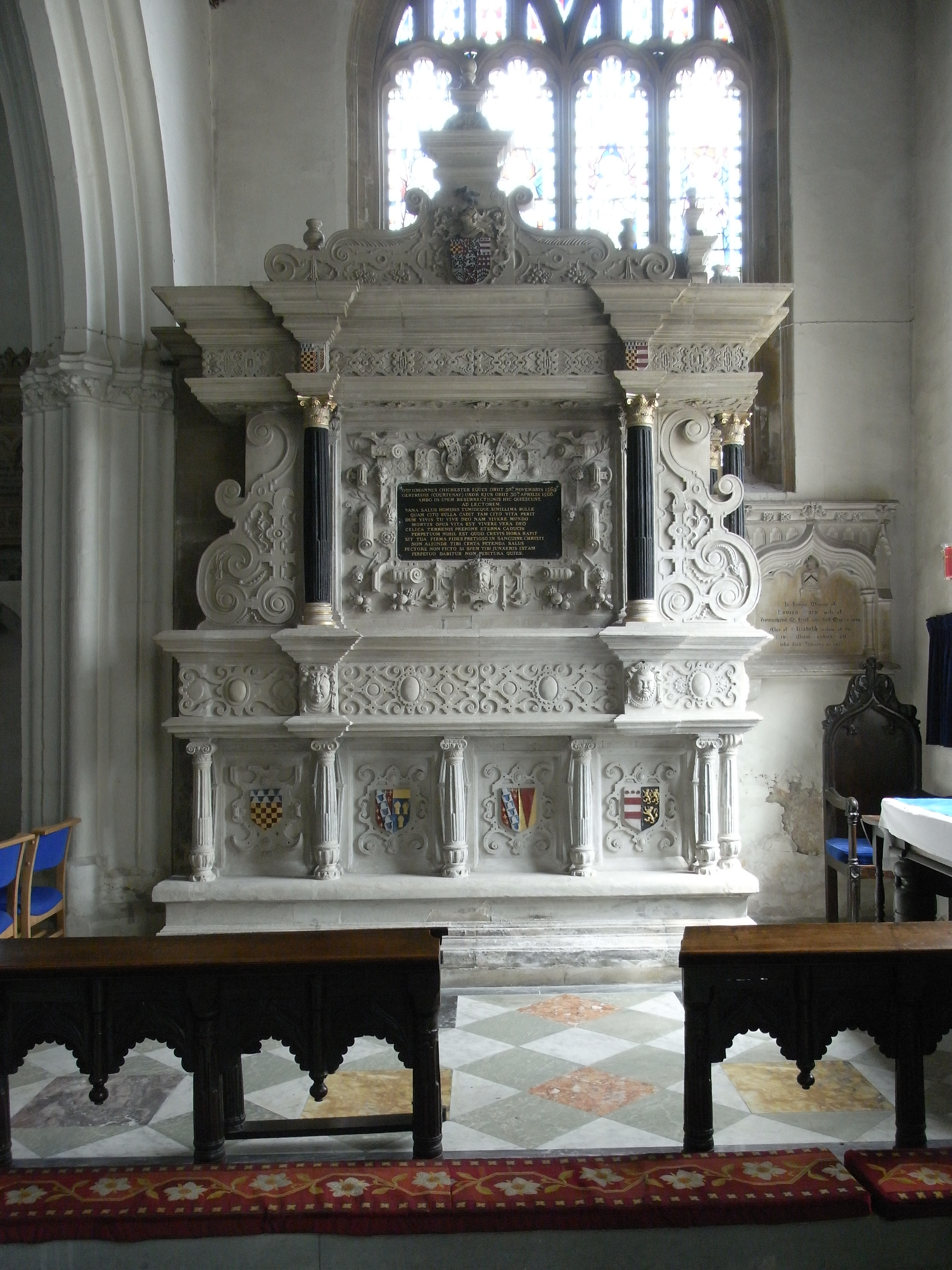
Memorial to Sir John Chichester (d.1569) in the Raleigh Chapel

The Church of St Mary the Virgin is a large parish church and formerly formed part of the Benedictine Pilton Priory which was founded 925-940 as a cell of Malmesbury Abbey. It was closed during the Dissolution of the Monasteries in 1533 when it was acquired by the Chichester Family of Raleigh Manor. The church building we see today is partly 13th-century (it was dedicated in 1259) and partly 15th-century with some limited restoration and rebuilding during the 17th century. It is built with local purple, grey and brown slatestone with sandstone dressings; the roofs are of slate. The church is approached through the pretty imitation-Tudor almshouses built in 1849.

The tower and South aisle date from the time of the Priory and on the church's North side the roof-line of the adjoining monastic buildings can still be seen, the cloister having run along the nave (hence the high sills of the North aisle windows) and traces of other taller buildings can be seen butting against the North tower. The church has a peal of eight bells some of which date from 1712. The tower is described as `rebuilt' according to an inscription on the porch by Robert Nutting in 1696 as a result of damage during the Civil War; the church has later rebuilding from 1845 to 1850.

== Interior of the church ==
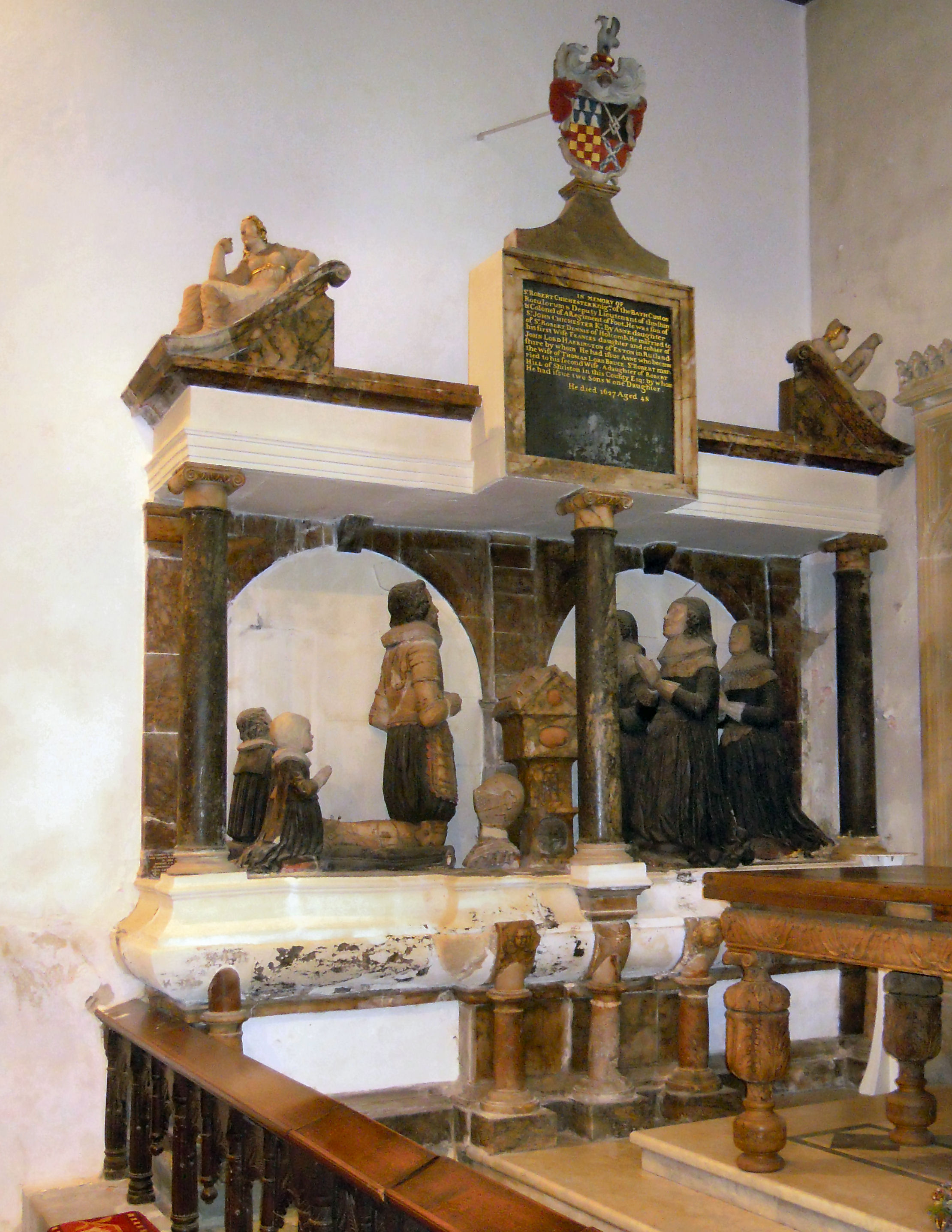
The monument to Sir Robert Chichester has life size figures

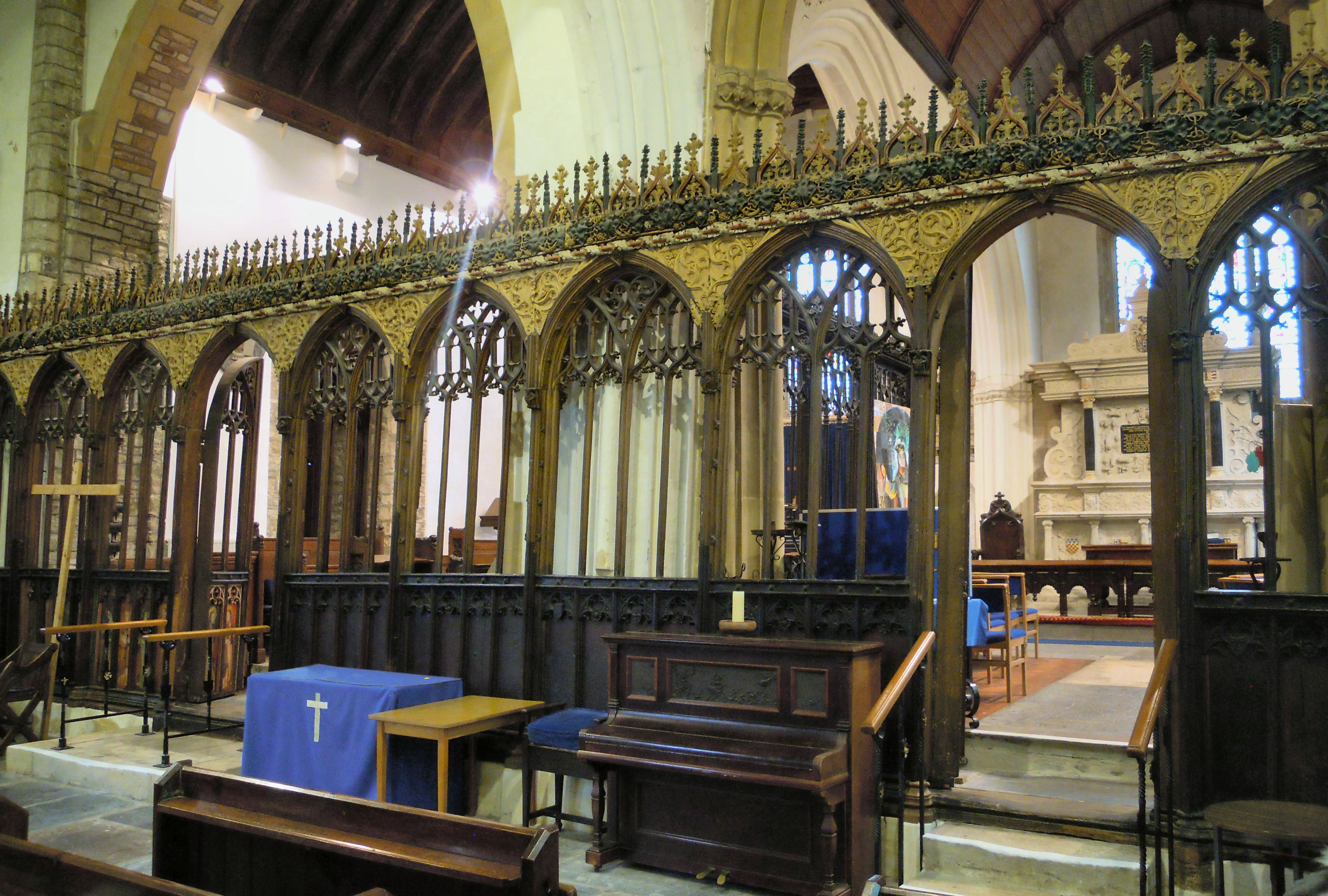
The elaborate painted rood screen

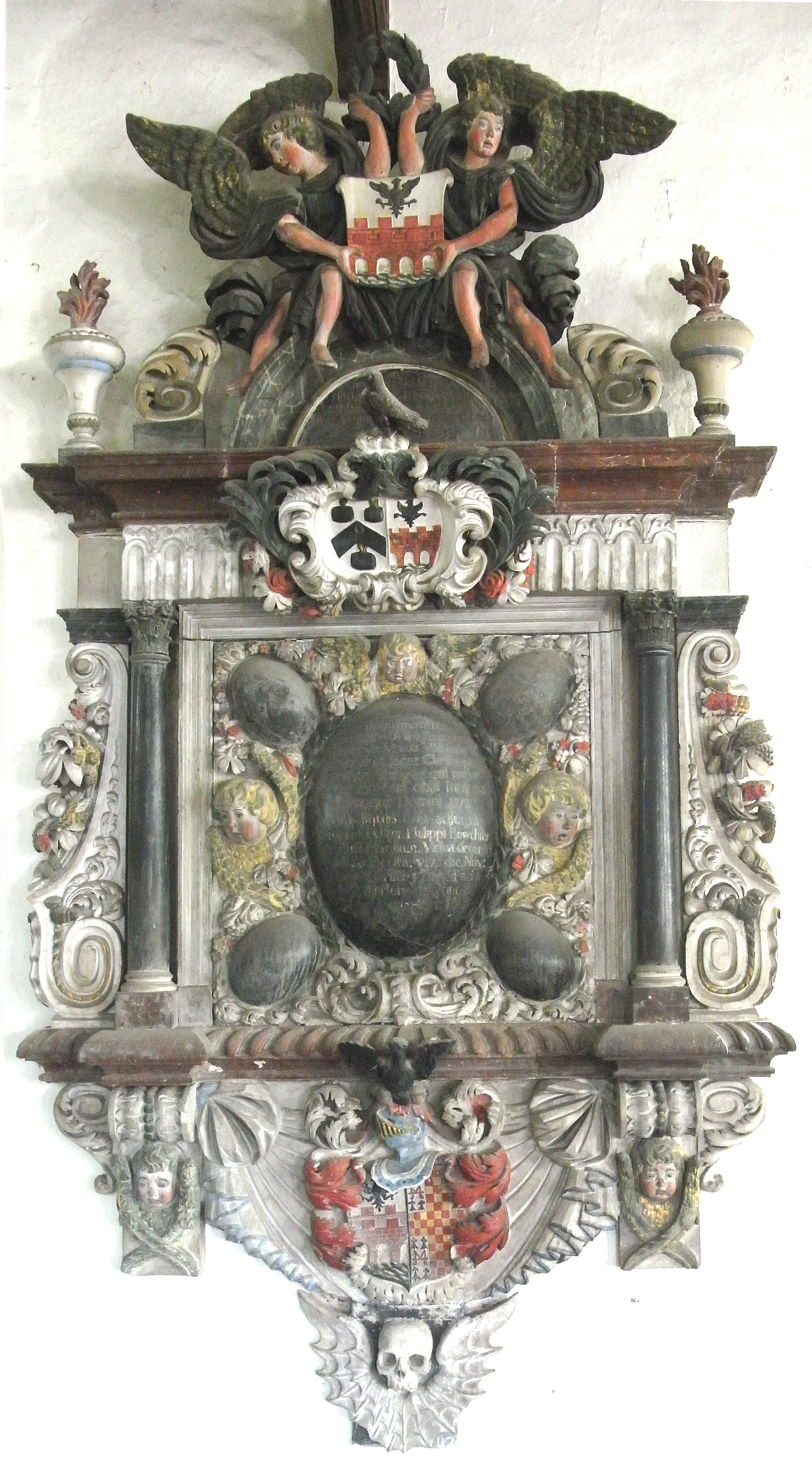
Wall monument to Christopher Lethbridge (d.1713)

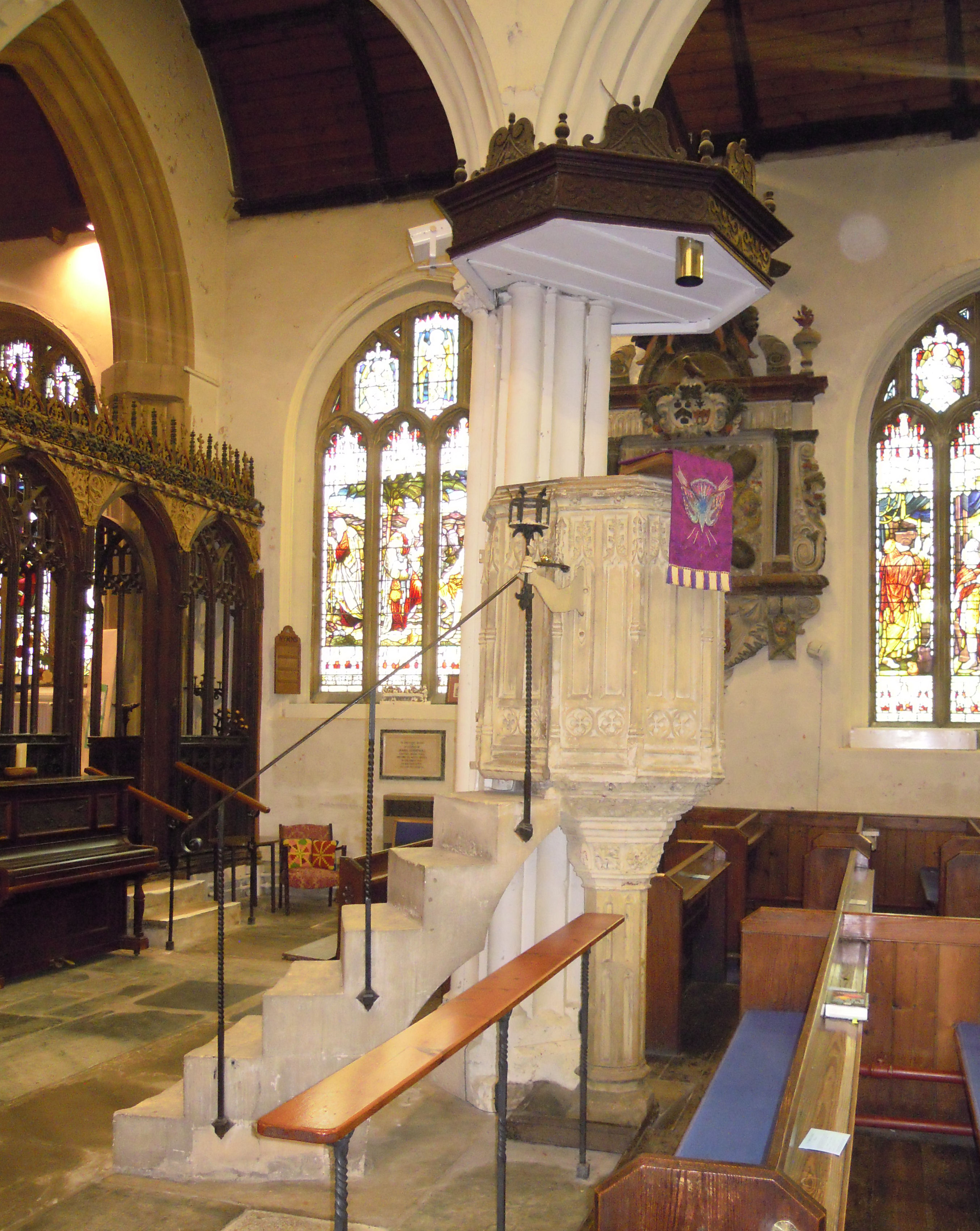
The pulpit with its iron arm dates to c1550

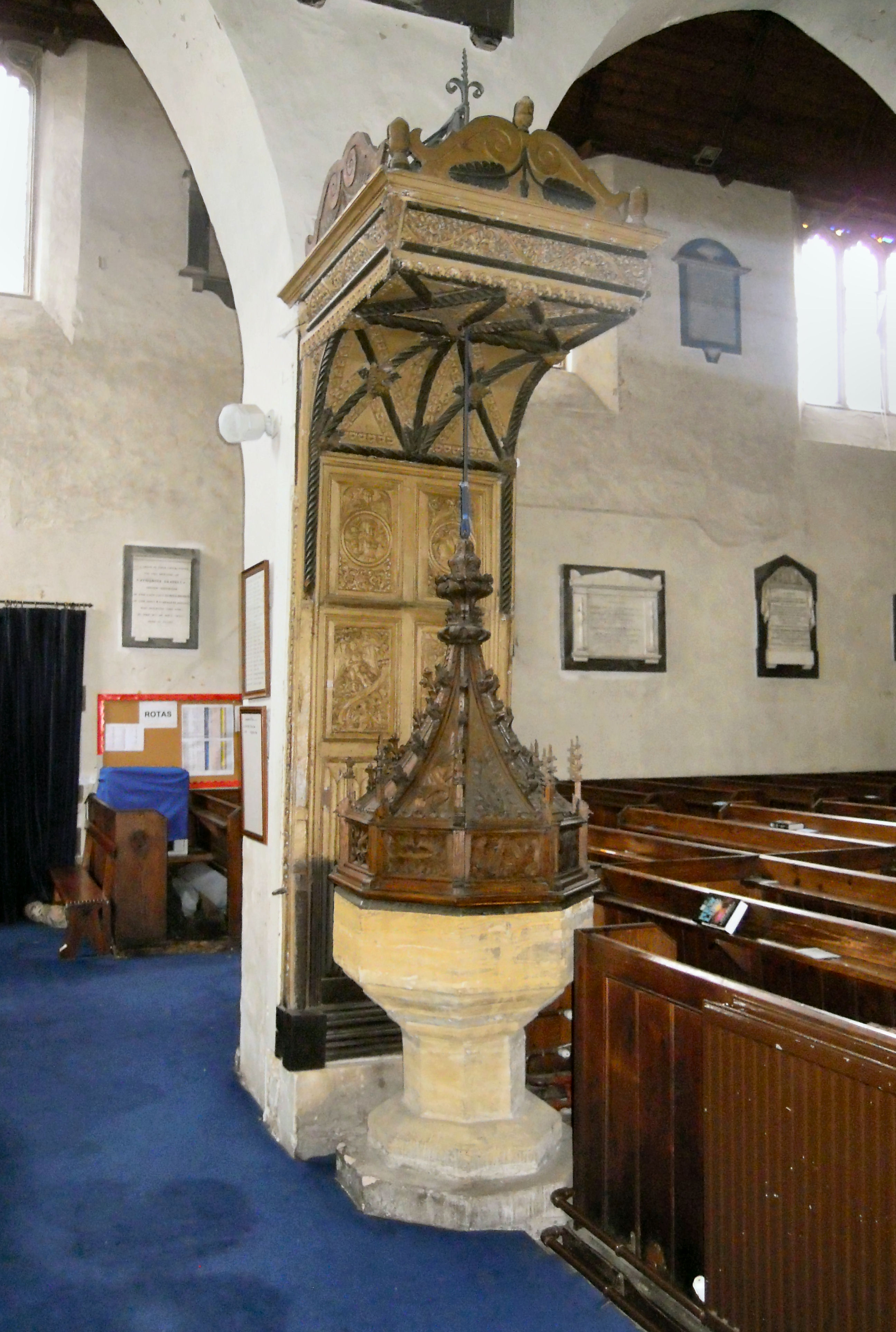
The font also dates to c1550

The North aisle has plain glass in its windows but some fragments of Medieval coloured glass can be seen in the tracery at the top. The nave and chancel were added to the North aisle section of the church in about 1320 to 1330, which is confirmed by an extract from the Register of Walter de Stapledon, Bishop of Exeter, who in 1311 made a contribution to Pilton Priory towards the cost of building the chancel.

The parclose screen into the South East chapel (the Raleigh Chapel) is of three bays and is well carved with a mixture of Gothic and Renaissance detail and is inscribed with an R for Raleigh and is presumably post-1533. It may have been brought to the church from the private chapel at Raleigh Manor when it was demolished in the 18th century. The stone pulpit is Perpendicular Period of about 1550 and stands on a stem while its panels are decorated with blind arcading with a Tudor rose carved above the pedestal and retaining some traces of its original colour. The pulpit has a Jacobean sounding board and projecting from the side there is an unusual iron arm and hand which is probably Elizabethan which once held an hourglass for timing the sermons. In 1616 a payment was made for a replacement hourglass, and in 1646 a half-hour glass was purchased, which suggests that shorter sermons had become the fashion.

The baptismal font has a plain octagonal Ham Hill bowl on a stem and a fine font cover which Nikolaus Pevsner believed was put together in the Elizabethan era. The font also dates to about 1550 and stands beneath a canopied tester made from pieces of Gothic and Renaissance carving including linenfold, figure panels, applied barley-sugar ribs and Gothic fretwork. The altar table with its pull-out leaves is late 16th-century and was restored in 1985. The communion rail is Elizabethan.

The rood screen that separates the chancel and Raleigh Chapel from the nave and South aisle has lost its coving and cresting while the spandrels have been filled with a variety of remnants from the missing pieces. The panels in the lower section once depicted the Apostles some of which have been restored to something like their original appearance. These images were added to the screen at the expense of Thomas Martyn who, when he died in 1510, left a legacy in his will for this purpose. Sometime later the images were obliterated with lime wash and red and green paint, while in Victorian times they were over-stained in brown. The expensive restoration process has been discontinued at present owing to cost but the aim is to restore further panels in the future.

A plaque is located above a very narrow moulded doorway in the chancel which originally lead to an East end chapel with an adjoining cell which was inhabited by a recluse in 1329. The Royal Arms of 1707 are those of Queen Anne and are painted on boards and fixed to the West end of the North wall. A section of medieval wall painting is visible on the West wall.

== Monuments ==
The church possesses some very notable monuments including a standing sandstone wall monument to Sir John Chichester (d.1569) at the West end of the South East chapel with columns and strapwork cartouches. On the North wall of the chancel can be found a fine monument with original colour to Sir Robert Chichester (d.1627) with two rows of life-size kneeling figures, including children facing a double prie-dieu. The South aisle has a large wall monument to Christopher Lethbridge (d.1713) with elaborate achievements and putto heads.
