= John Chichester (died 1586) =

Arms of Chichester: Chequy or and gules, a chief vair

Sir John Chichester (died 31 March 1586) lord of the manor of Raleigh in the parish of Pilton, near Barnstaple, North Devon, was Sheriff of Devon in 1576/7 and/or in 1585 and died of gaol fever contracted whilst acting as a magistrate at the Lent Black Assizes of Exeter in 1586.

== Origins ==
John Chichester was the eldest son and heir of Sir John Chichester (1519/20–1569) of Raleigh, a leading member of the Devonshire gentry. His mother was Gertrude Courtenay, a daughter of Sir William Courtenay (1477–1535) of Powderham.

He had at least six brothers, three of whom became Governor of Carrickfergus: Sir John Chichester, junior, who was killed at the Battle of Carrickfergus (1597); Arthur Chichester, 1st Baron Chichester (1563–1624/5), who succeeded him; and Edward Chichester, 1st Viscount Chichester (1568–1648) of Eggesford, Devon, who became governor on Arthur's death.

== Marriage and children ==
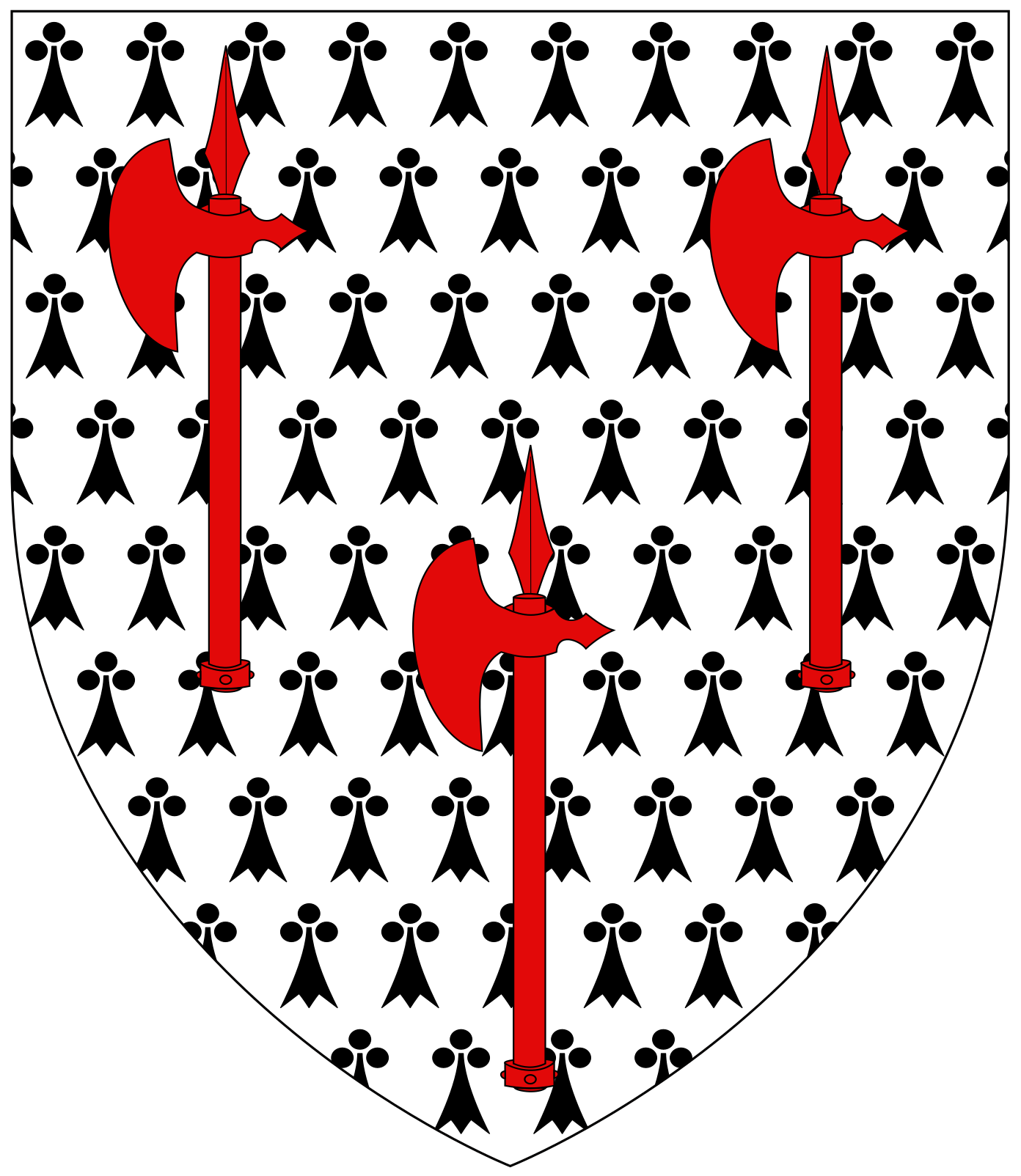
Arms of Dennis of Holcombe Burnell & Bicton, Devon: Ermine, three battle-axes gules

John Chichester married Anne Dennis, the eldest daughter of Sir Robert Dennis (died 1592), of Holcombe Burnell, in Devon, by his wife Mary Blount who was one of the two daughters and co-heiresses of William Blount, 4th Baron Mountjoy (c. 1478–1534), KG, and a first cousin of Lady Jane Grey. Their children included:

- Sir Robert Chichester (1579–1627), eldest son and heir (whose kneeling effigy and monument survives in Pilton Church), father of Sir John Chichester, 1st Baronet (1626-1667).
- John Chichester (1605–1627), second son, died childless aged 22.
- Mary Chichester, eldest daughter, who married twice, firstly to Thomas Francis of Combe Florey in Somerset; secondly to John Smith of Tregonnacke in Cornwall.
- Gertrude Chichester, second daughter, wife of Amias Copleston (1581/2–1621) of Warleigh in the parish of Tamerton Foliot in Devon, and lord of the Manor of Copleston in Devon.
- Elizabeth Chichester (died 26 January 1656/7), third daughter, who married William Coryton (1580–1651). She was the mother of Sir John Coryton, 1st Baronet (1621–1680).

== Death ==
Chichester died in 1586 of gaol fever contracted whilst serving as a magistrate at the Lent Black Assizes of Exeter in 1586, which accounted for the deaths of many people, including several other prominent Devonshire magistrates and visiting circuit judges.

== Sources ==
- Vivian, Lt.Col. J.L., (Ed.) The Visitations of the County of Devon: Comprising the Heralds' Visitations of 1531, 1564 & 1620, Exeter, 1895
