= Pilton West =

Civil parish in Devon, England

Coordinates: 51.0956°N 4.0734°W

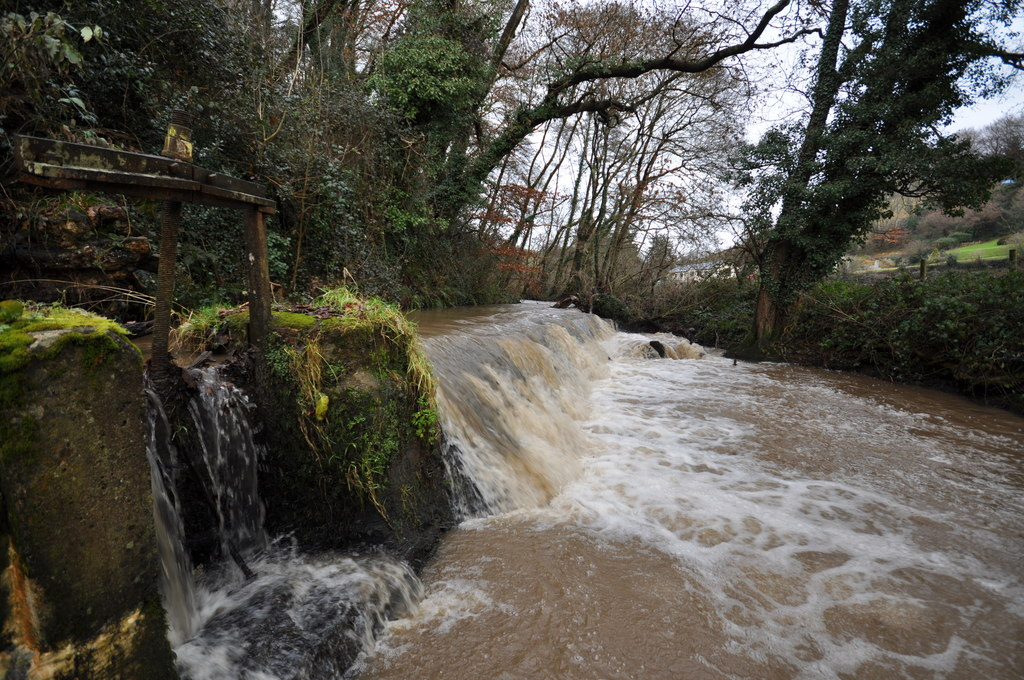
- A weir and sluice gate on Bradiford Water in Tutshill Wood, in Pilton West

- Location within Devon
- Population: 253 (2019)
- Civil parish: Pilton West
- District: North Devon
- Shire county: Devon
- Region: South West
- Country: England
- Sovereign state: United Kingdom
- Post town: BARNSTAPLE
- Postcode district: EX31
- Dialling code: 01271
- Police: Devon and Cornwall
- Fire: Devon and Somerset
- Ambulance: South Western
- UK Parliament: North Devon

Pilton West is a rural civil parish of North Devon, Devon, England, immediately north-west of the suburb of Pilton in the town of Barnstaple. The parish was created as "West Pilton" in 1894 from the parts of the ancient parish of Pilton which lay outside the borough boundaries of Barnstaple. The parish was renamed Pilton West in 1999. In 2019, the population of Pilton West was 253, and its area was around 1.6 square miles (4.16 square kilometres). The parish is older than the national average — 28% of the local residents are over 65, compared to 18% of the British population — and it is overwhelmingly white, with the 2011 census finding that all but one of the parish's residents identified themselves as white. It elects a parish council, the clerk of which is Geoff Dwyer.

The parish spans a wide tract of land to the north-west of Barnstaple, from the River Yeo and Smoky House Lane in the east to the banks of the River Taw's estuary and a short section of the A361 road in the south-west. The A39 road — named here as Shirwell Road — and Upcott Hill run north–south through the parish, connecting it with Pilton proper. There is also a north–south right of way that follows the path of a rivulet called the Colm Stream or Bradiford Water, and next to the right of way, a copse called Tutshill Woods. One traveller reports that Tutshill Woods is a popular dog-walking spot.
