= Prie-dieu =

Desk article for private devotional use

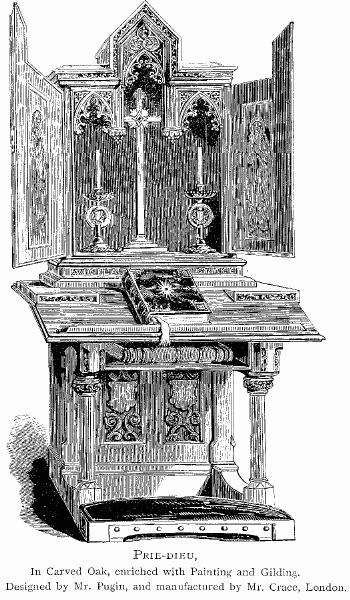
A fairly large, elaborately carved prie-dieu with a built-in altar that can be closed

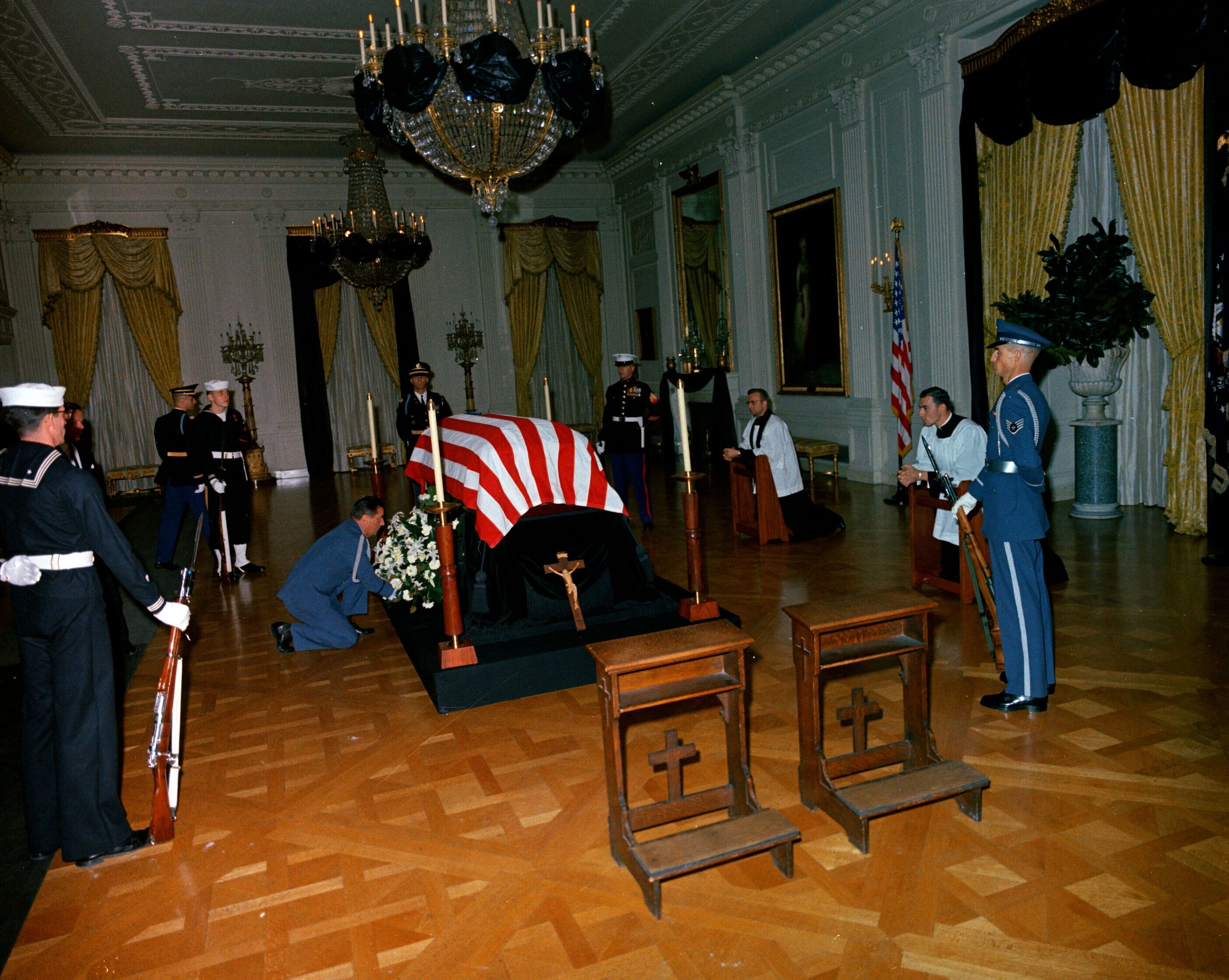
Prie-dieux facing the casket of the US President John F. Kennedy in the East Room of the White House in 1963. The priests Robert Mohan and Gilbert Hartke are praying on two more to the right.

A prie-dieu (pl. prie-dieux; French: [pʁi djø], lit. 'pray [to] God') is a type of prayer desk primarily intended for private devotional use, but which may also be found in churches. A similar form of chair in domestic furniture is called "prie-dieu" by analogy. Sometimes, a prie-dieu will consist only of the sloped shelf for books without the kneeler.

== History ==
The prie-dieu appears not to have received its present name until the early 17th century. In that period in France, a small room or oratory was sometimes known by the same name. In the Middle Ages, the faithful attended the parish services standing. From the 16th century onwards, wooden benches or chairs were made available, according to an order fixed by the customary law, and rented from the farmer who was the successful bidder for the "chair farm" or from the churchwarden, the fixed prices (increased during solemn masses) being collected by the chairmaker.

== Description and use ==
The design of this prayer stand varied in time, eventually settling as a small, ornamental wooden desk furnished with a thin, sloping shelf for books or hands, and a kneeler. Sometimes, instead of the sloping shelf, a padded arm rest will be provided. This type is useful for devotions such as the Rosary, which do not require a book, or for private, non-liturgical prayer.

Prie-dieux may be provided in church weddings for the bride and groom to kneel on during the service (either one long double prie-dieu or a pair), or may be used by a cleric when he or she leads the worshippers in prayers such as litanies and other prayers. In the Byzantine Rite, a prie-dieu is provided for the bishop when he kneels in the Holy Doors during the consecration of a church. One may also be used by the priest reciting Kneeling Prayers at Pentecost.

== See also ==
- Analogion
- Credence table
- Travelling icons
