= Pilton, Devon =

Suburb within the town of Barnstaple

Coordinates: 51.089°N 4.063°W

Pilton
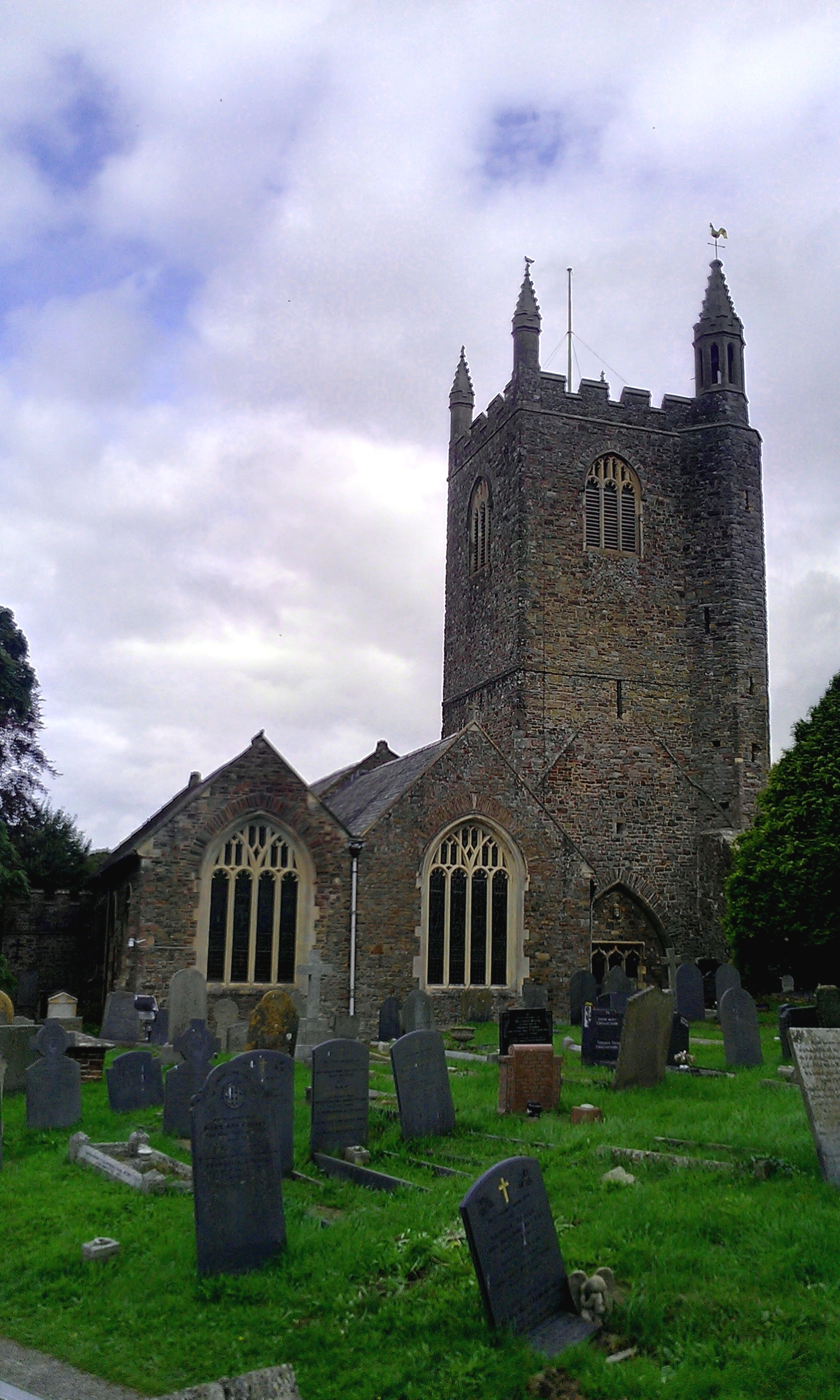
- St Mary the Virgin church

- Location within Devon
- Civil parish: Barnstaple
- District: North Devon
- Shire county: Devon
- Region: South West
- Country: England
- Sovereign state: United Kingdom

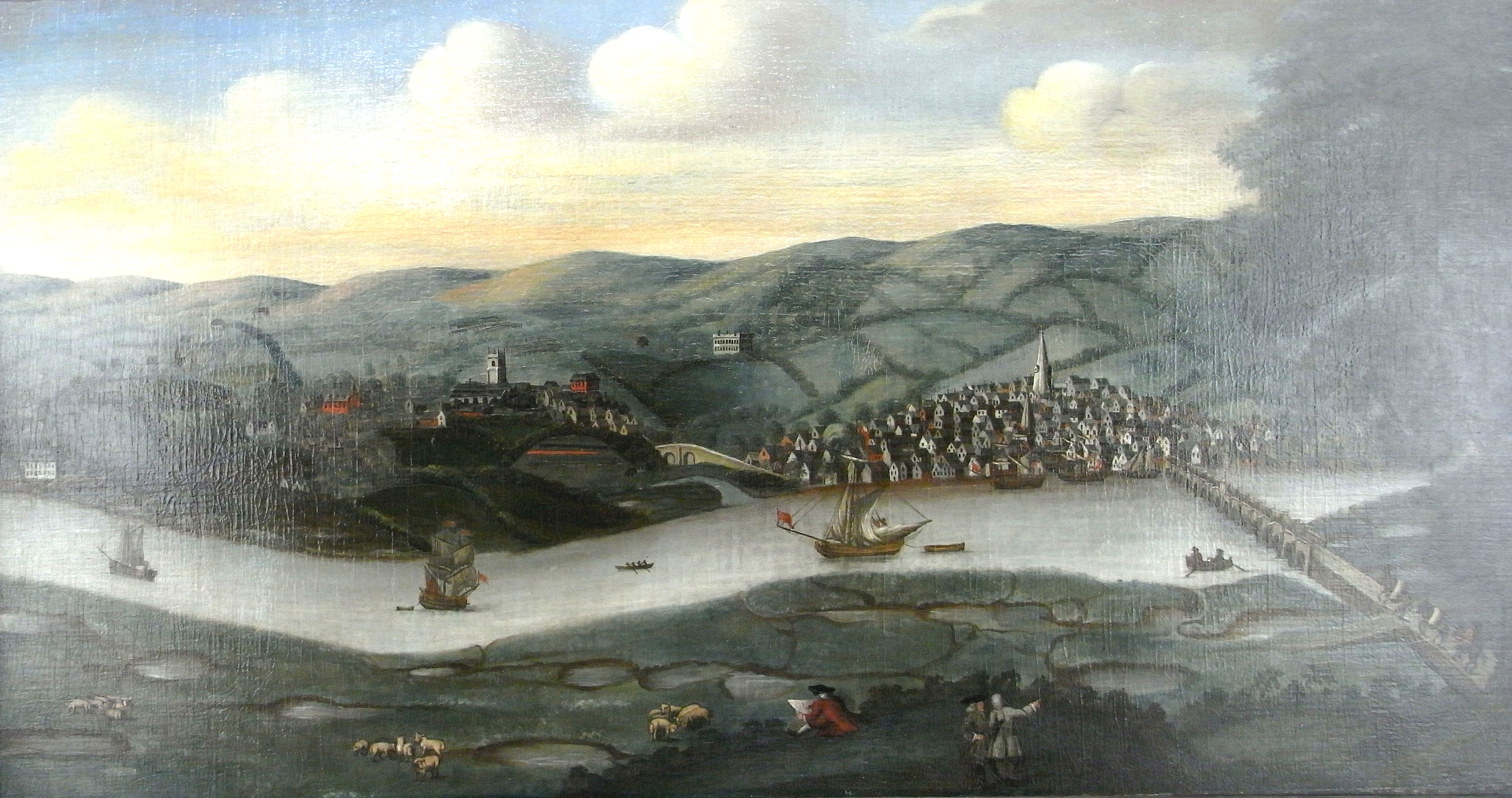
18th century view of Pilton (left) and Barnstaple (right), divided by the small River Yeo, flowing into the broad River Taw (foreground). Left: St Mary's Church, Pilton; Pilton Bridge over the River Yeo. The centrally placed crenellated white mansion house appears to represent Pilton House, built in 1746. Right: St Peter's Church, Barnstaple, with spire; Barnstaple Long Bridge over River Taw. Undocumented 18th century (?) oil painting now in the Museum of Barnstaple and North Devon

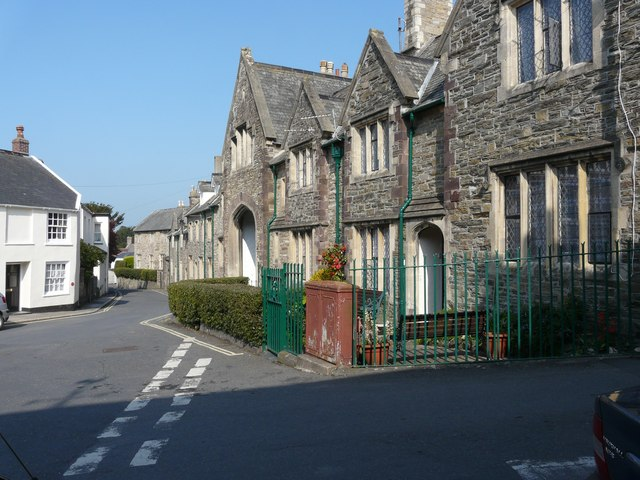
Bull Hill, Pilton

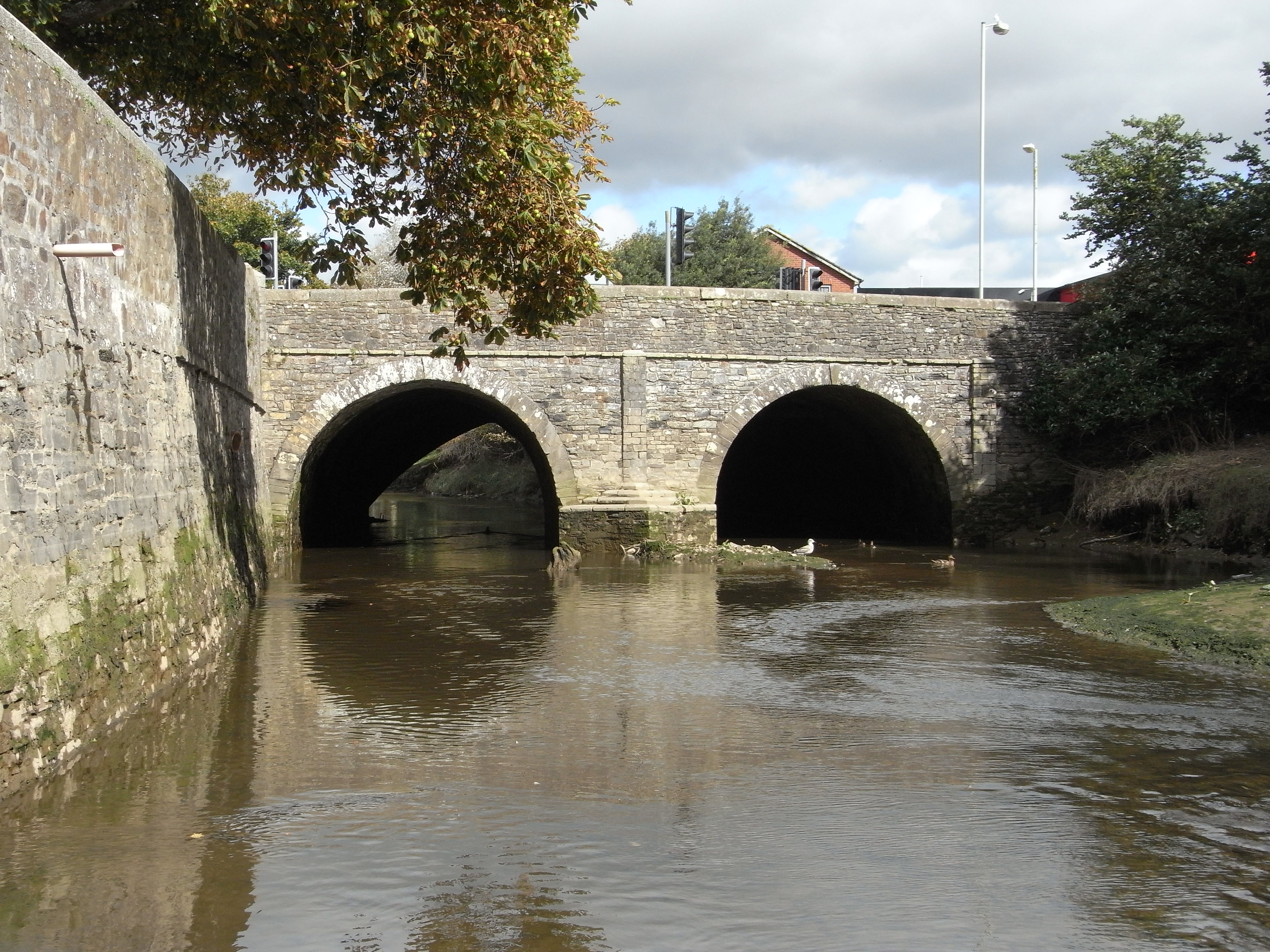
Bridge over River Yeo at northern end of Pilton Causeway linking towns of Barnstaple and Pilton. Built originally by Sir John Stowford

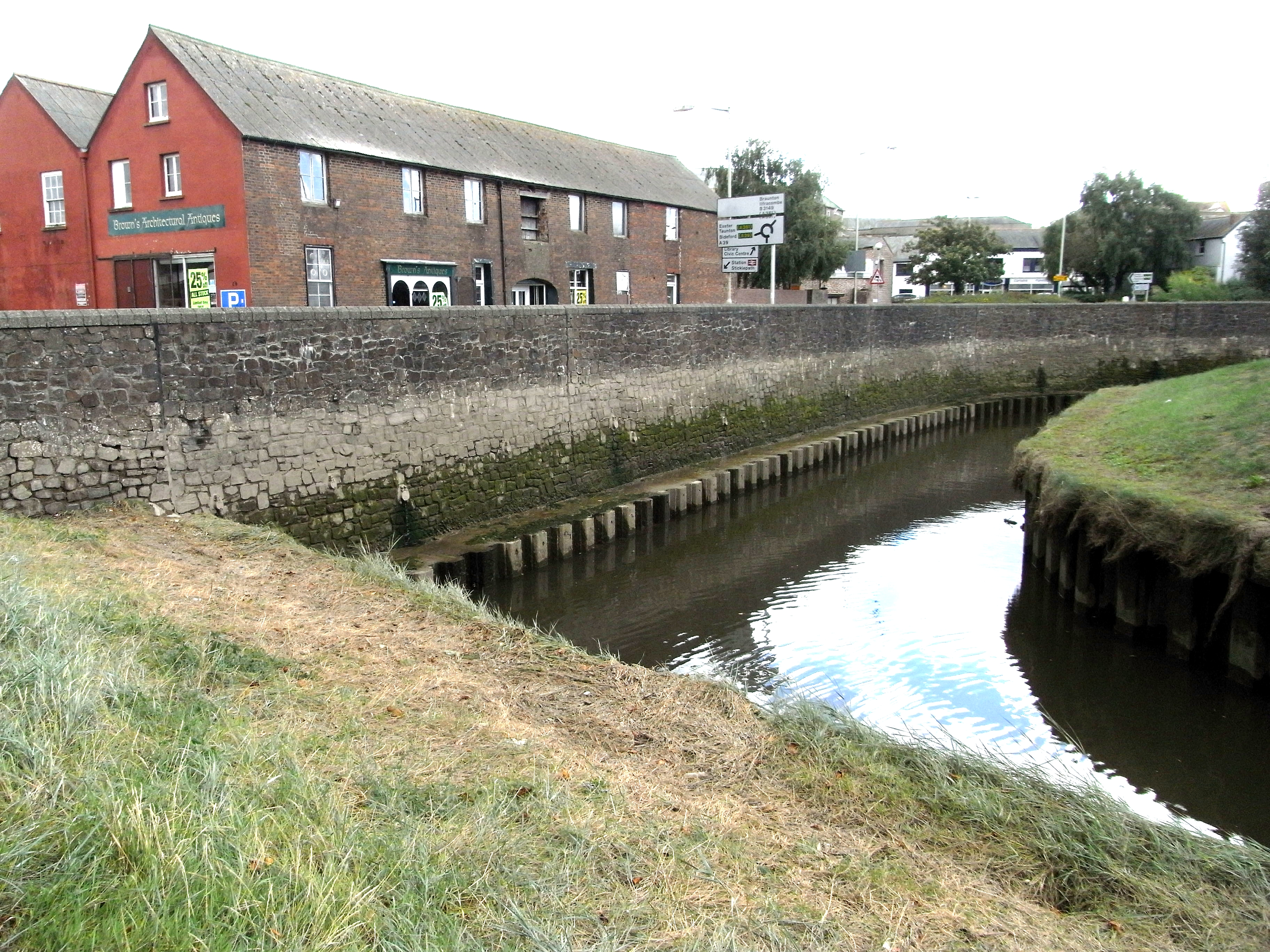
Pilton Causeway, looking towards Barnstaple. Here it crosses the tip of the last surviving meander in the River Yeo. Built originally by Sir John Stowford

Pilton is a suburb of the town of Barnstaple, it is located about quarter of a mile north of the town centre, in the civil parish of Barnstaple, in the North Devon district, in the county of Devon, England. It was formerly a separate village. The civil parish of Pilton West covers the more rural parts of the ancient parish of Pilton that have not been incorporated into the town of Barnstaple. In 2009, the Pilton (Barnstaple) ward had a population of 4,239 living in some 1,959 dwellings. It has its own infants and junior school, houses one of Barnstaple's larger secondary schools, and one of Barnstaple's SEN specialist schools. North Devon Hospital is also within West Pilton parish. It has a Church Hall, two public houses, two hotels, and residential homes. It has residential estates of both private and public housing including flats. It also has a historic Church that dates back to at least the 11th Century.

It was once separated from the adjacent town of Barnstaple by the River Yeo. Sir John Stowford (born c.1290 died c.1372) of Stowford, West Down. Chief Baron of the Exchequer built Pilton Causeway which links the town of Barnstaple and village of Pilton, which were then separated by the treacherous marshy ground in which flowed the tidal meanders of the small River Yeo. It is recounted by John Prince (1643–1723), that Stowford decided on building the causeway when on his way from his home at Stowford, north of Pilton, to Barnstaple, he met whilst fording the Yeo the drowned bodies of a woman with her child. He is also believed to have contributed to the financing of the long-bridge in Barnstaple.

== History ==
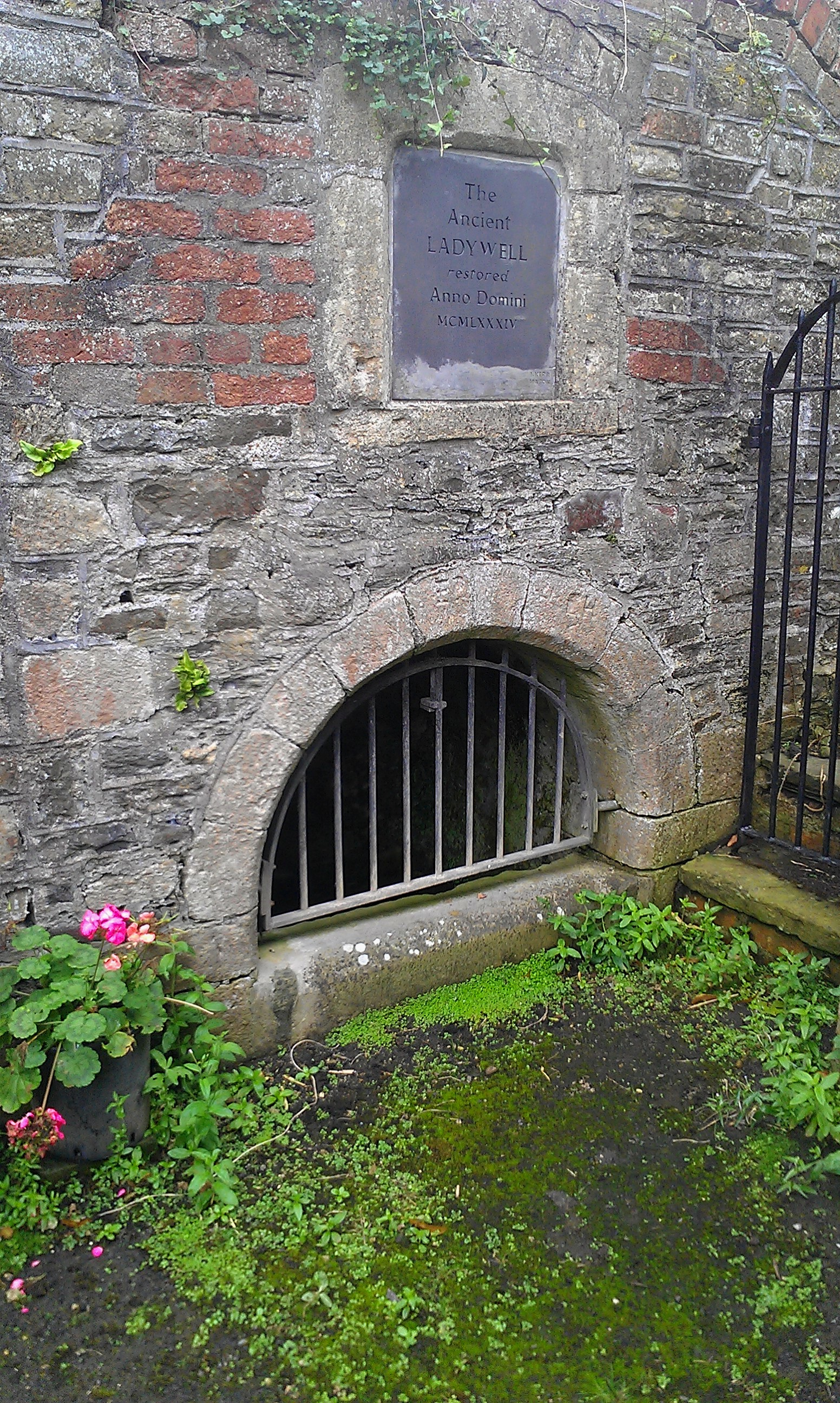
Ladywell in Pilton

Pilton was originally separate from Barnstaple. Situated on an easily defended hill at the head of the Taw estuary and close to where the river narrows enough to be fordable, Pilton was an important Saxon settlement. Alfred the Great (871–899) had a fortified town, or burh, built at Pilton. According to the Burghal Hidage, an early 10th Century document setting out the details of all burhs then functioning, Pilton's wall was 1485 feet long and the nominated garrison consisted of 360 men drawn from the surrounding district in the event of an invasion. The other burhs in Devon were Exeter, Halwell (near Totnes) and Lydford; Watchet in Somerset was another burh which could provide mutual support. Pilton remained the site of the original burh through much of the 10th century until this was moved a mile or so to the south-east to become Barnstaple, probably because times were more peaceful and the burh's role as a civilian market centre had become more significant. Barnstaple was better located for trade and developed as a market town and then as a borough. A Saxon ford would have typically been indicated by a stapol, or post – Bearda's stapol giving the town of Barnstaple its name.

The 13th century parish Church of St Mary the Virgin is a Grade I listed building. This building is used for regular services, coffee mornings and concerts.

Part of the parish, including the village itself, was added to the borough of Barnstaple in 1836. In 1891 the parish had a population of 2172. The parish was divided into two civil parishes in 1894 under the Local Government Act 1894, which said that parishes could not straddle borough boundaries. The part of Pilton within the borough of Barnstaple became a parish called "East Pilton", and the part outside the borough became "West Pilton". As an urban parish, East Pilton did not have a parish council but was directly administered by the town council. The parish of East Pilton was abolished in 1974, becoming part of the parish of Barnstaple. The parish of West Pilton was renamed Pilton West in 1999.

Since 2012, the history and heritage of Pilton has been collected by a group based in Pilton Church Hall, which is compiling an archive of old and new memories, tales, documents, recordings and photographs of the people and settlement of the settlement The Pilton Story.

=== Leper Hospital ===
A history of St. Margaret's Leper Hospital at Pilton was written by the genealogist Benjamin Incledon (1730–1796), of Pilton House, whose ancient family had originated at the estate of Incledon, 3 miles north-west of Braunton. It was published in Archæologia, vol. xii. pp. 211–14.

=== Victorian Pilton ===
White's Devonshire Directory (published 1850) described Pilton in these terms:-

PILTON is a pleasant village, on an eminence, about half a mile north of Barnstaple. Its parish contains 1805 inhabitants, and is mostly included in the Borough of Barnstaple. . . The manor of Pilton belonged to a Benedictine Priory, which was founded here as a cell to Malmsbury Abbey, and was valued at £56. 12s. 8d. per annum at the dissolution, when it and the manor were granted to the Chichester family. The manor, after passing to the Sydenham, Northmore, and other families, was dismembered. John Whyte, Esq., owns the site of the priory, and Westaway estate, and has a handsome mansion here, called Pilton House; but a great part of the parish belongs to the Trustees of the late Lord Rolle, J. R. Griffiths, Esq., Capt. May, and several other freeholders.

Morris and Co.'s Commercial Directory and Gazetteer (published 1870) expanded this with:-

In the census of 1861, 1863 inhabitants, and 1861 acres; in the deanery and archdeaconry of Barnstaple, diocese of Exeter, hundred of Braunton, North Devonshire, a portion of it being included in the borough of Barnstaple, from which it is separated by the river Yeo, which is here crossed by a bridge. The vicarage in the incumbency of the Rev. William Cradock Hall, M.A., is valued at £105 per annum, with residence, and is in the patronage of William Hodge, Esq. The church is an ancient Gothic edifice, dedicated to St. Mary, formerly part of a priory of the Benedictines, established here as a cell to Malmesbury Abbey: it has an embattled tower and a peal of eight bells. The tower was partly destroyed by the Parliamentarians in 1646, but was rebuilt in 1696. In the church is a stone pulpit, handsomely carved, with an arm attached to it holding an hour glass. There are tablets and tombs in memory of some members of the Chichester family, also two brasses to the memory of Alexander and Robert Bret. There are some considerable charitable bequests for the benefit of the poor, which are under the management of charity trustees, and also several almshouses. The Honourable Mark Rolle is lord of the manor, and one of the principal landowners.

== Education ==
Pilton has four schools: Pathfield Special Educational Needs School (Reception – Post 16), 'Pilton Infants' (Reception – Year 2), 'Pilton Bluecoat' (Year 3 – 6), secondary school 'Pilton Community College' (Year 7 – 11). Pathfield School caters for pupils with profound or severe learning difficulties and for pupils on the autistic spectrum, serving an age range 3–19 and is a member of the SENtient Trust – a Co-operative Educational Trust. Pilton Infants is an infants school serving 5–7 year-old pupils in and around the Pilton area. At the age of 7, pupils usually proceed into the Pilton Bluecoat Junior School. Pilton Bluecoat is a junior school serving an age range of 7–11. Pupils from this school usually proceed into Pilton Community College at age 11. Pilton Community College is a coeducational secondary school serving an age range 11–16 and is also an academy.

== Historic estates ==
The parish of Pilton contained several historic estates or manors:

=== Pilland ===
The estate of Pilland was held for many years by the Brett family, alias "Brighte", "Brite", etc. Robert Brett (d.1540) was lord of the manor of Pilland and the last steward of Pilton Priory before the dissolution of the monasteries In 1536 following its dissolution, Robert Brett purchased the Prior's House (now called "Bull House") next to Pilton Church. Robert's daughter Joan Brett married three times, all to prominent members of the Devonshire gentry, firstly to John I Courtenay (1466–1509), lord of the manor of Molland and secondly (after 1510), as his second wife, Sir John Chichester (died 1537) lord of the manor of Raleigh in the parish of Pilton, and from her were descended the cadet branch of the Chichester family of Arlington. Joan married thirdly (after 1537) to Henry Fortescue (d.1587) of Wimpstone in the parish of Modbury, the earliest known Devonshire seat of that prominent family later created Earl Fortescue of Castle Hill, Filleigh.

The Brett family was from Whitestaunton in Somerset and had married the heiress of Pilland late in the 15th. century. The Brett family is today represented by Viscount Esher. The arms of Brett are: Or, a lion rampant between six crosses crosslet fitchy gules.

=== Pilton House ===
Pilton House was built in 1746 by Robert Incledon (1676–1758), a lawyer of New Inn, London, Clerk of the Peace and Deputy Recorder of Barnstaple and twice Mayor of Barnstaple, in 1712 and 1721. He was a member of the local ancient gentry family of de Incledon (later Incledon, pronounced "Ingleton"), which originated at the estate of Incledon, in the parish of Braunton, which family is first recorded in 1160. He was the younger of the two sons of Lewis III Incledon (1636–1699) of Buckland House, Braunton, about 5 miles to the north-west of Pilton.

=== Pottington ===
The estate of Pottington eventually was acquired by George Rolle (c.1486–1552), of Stevenstone, whose family retained it until after the death of Mark Rolle in 1907. The Rolles were responsible for much development in Pottington and after this family are named Rolle Bridge, which spans the River Yeo which separates Barnstaple from Pottington, and the Rolle Quay, on the River Yeo on the Pottington side.

== Railways ==
From 1898 to 1935, Pilton was the main depot and operating centre for the Lynton & Barnstaple Railway. The site, a triangle of land to the East of Pilton Causeway, south of Yeo Vale Road and North of what is now the A361, was originally part of the tannery and reverted to its original ownership when the line closed. The Yard Offices were, for many years after, home to The Sheepskin Shop, and more recently used as an antiquarian furniture shop. The carriage sheds, locomotive shed and other remnants of the railway were destroyed in a fire in 1992 and much of the site is now used for car parking.

== Pilton Festival ==
Pilton was granted the right to hold an annual festival by Edward III. Since it was revived in 1982, the Pilton Festival is normally held on the third weekend of July and incorporates Green Man Day. The Pilton Festival includes a parade through Barnstaple, market, craft and food stalls, live music and performances of a Green Man pageant at Pilton House. The event is non-profitmaking for the organisers, who aim to providing family fun and entertainment, celebrating the local community and helping local charities and businesses.
