= Keilway =

Keilway is a surname. Notable people with the surname include:

- Anne Keilway (died 1620), English aristocrat
- Robert Keilway (1497–1581), English politician
- Robert Keilway (MP for Salisbury) (1483–1537), English politician
- Francis Keilway (died 1602), English politician
