= Wedding of Frederick V of the Palatinate and Princess Elizabeth =

1613 wedding in London, England

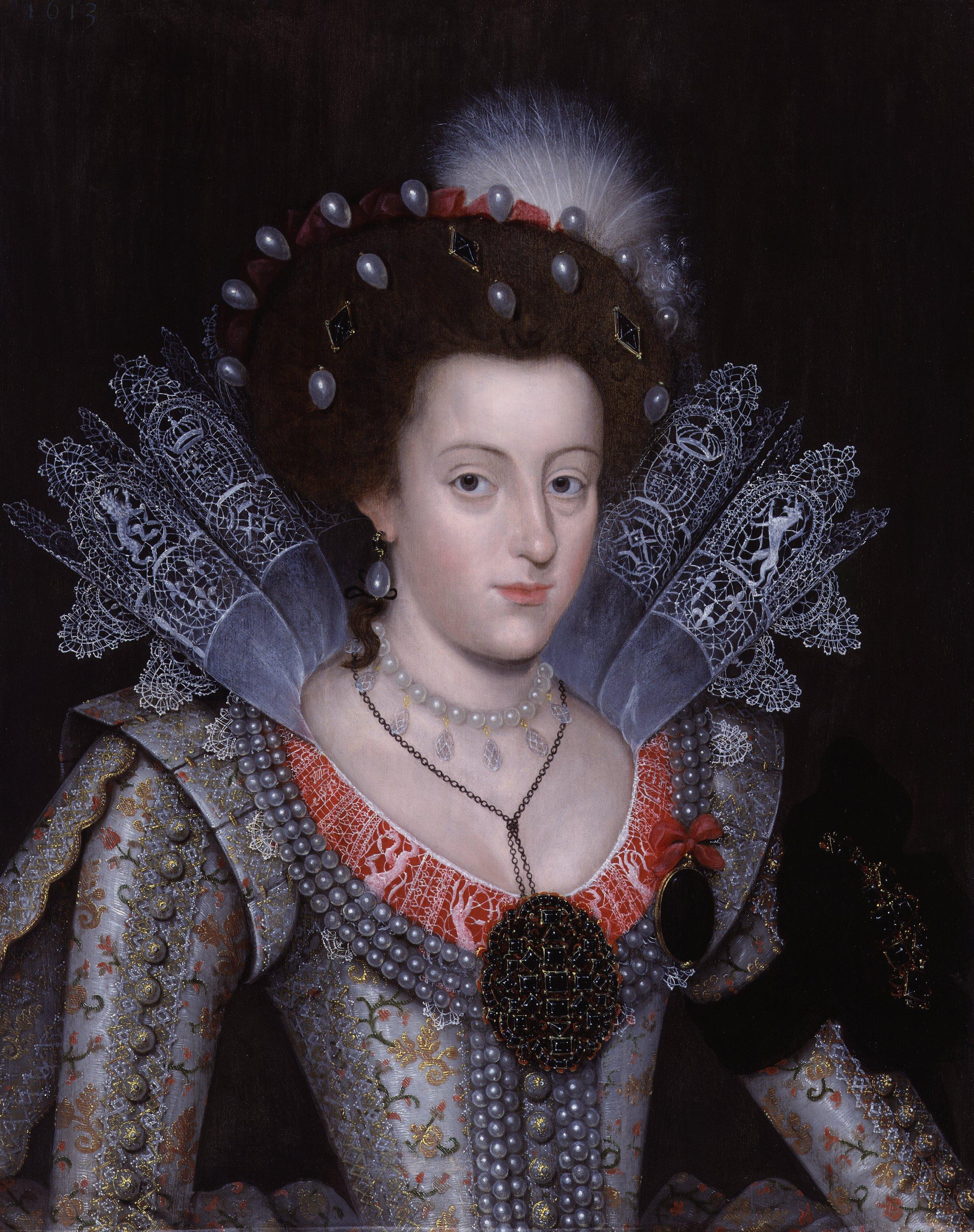
Elizabeth Stuart, Queen of Bohemia, National Portrait Gallery, London, thought to be a wedding portrait. Her pearl and diamond necklace may represent the jewels given by the cities of Edinburgh and London.

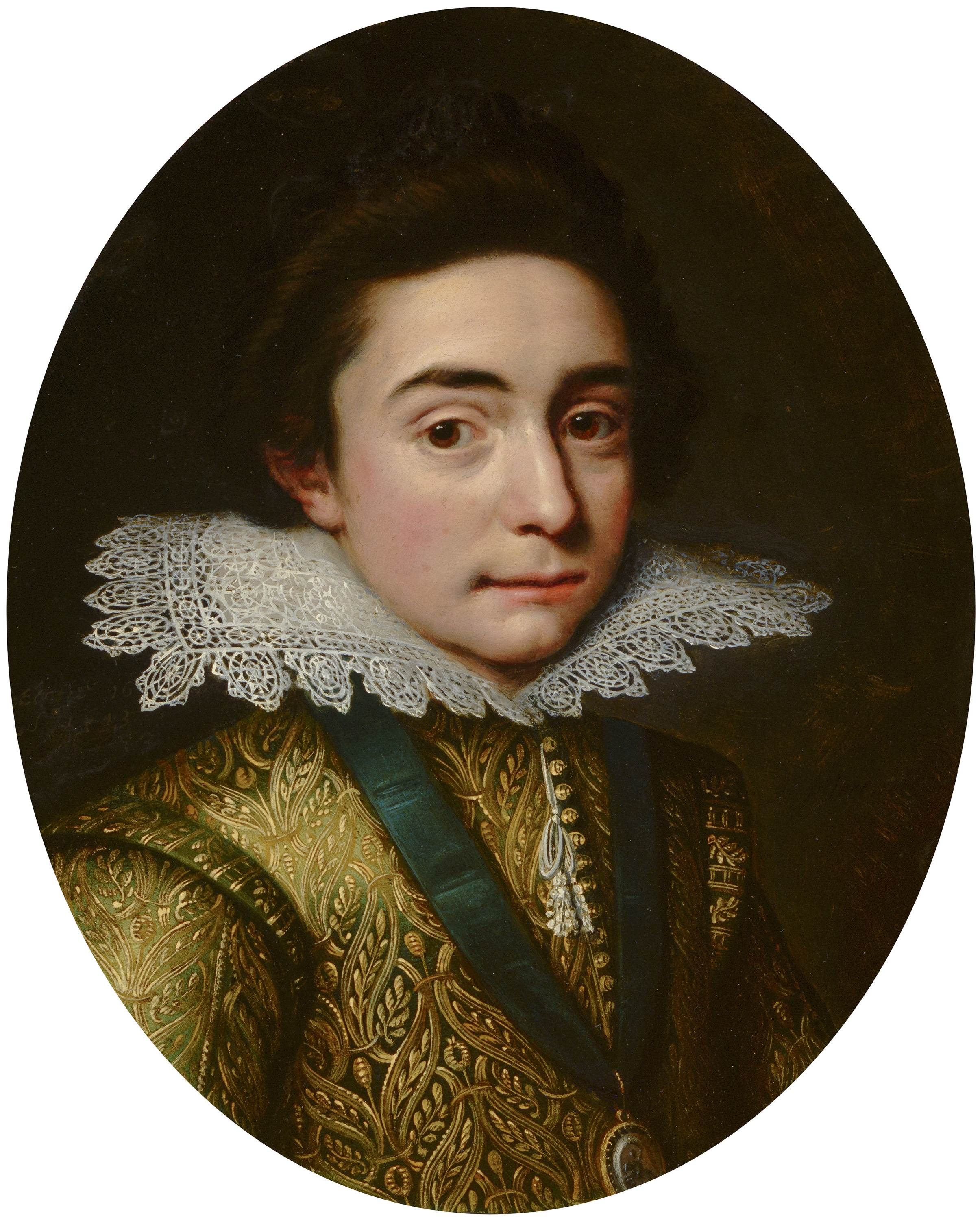
Portrait of Frederick V of the Palatinate by Michiel Jansz. van Mierevelt, 1613

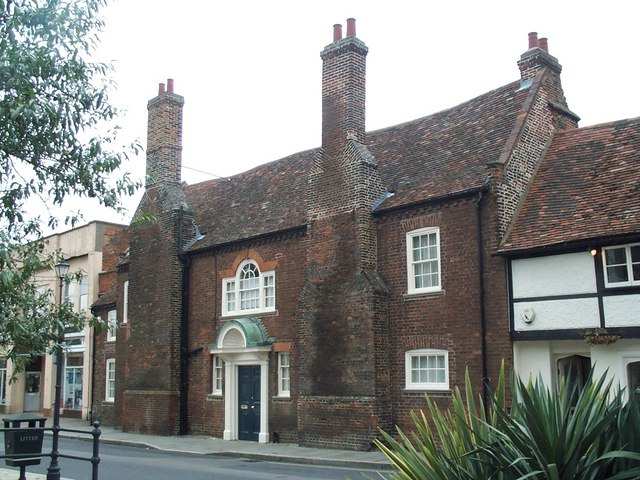
James VI and I and Frederick V went to Royston to talk things over, now that Elizabeth was nearer in succession to the throne of England.

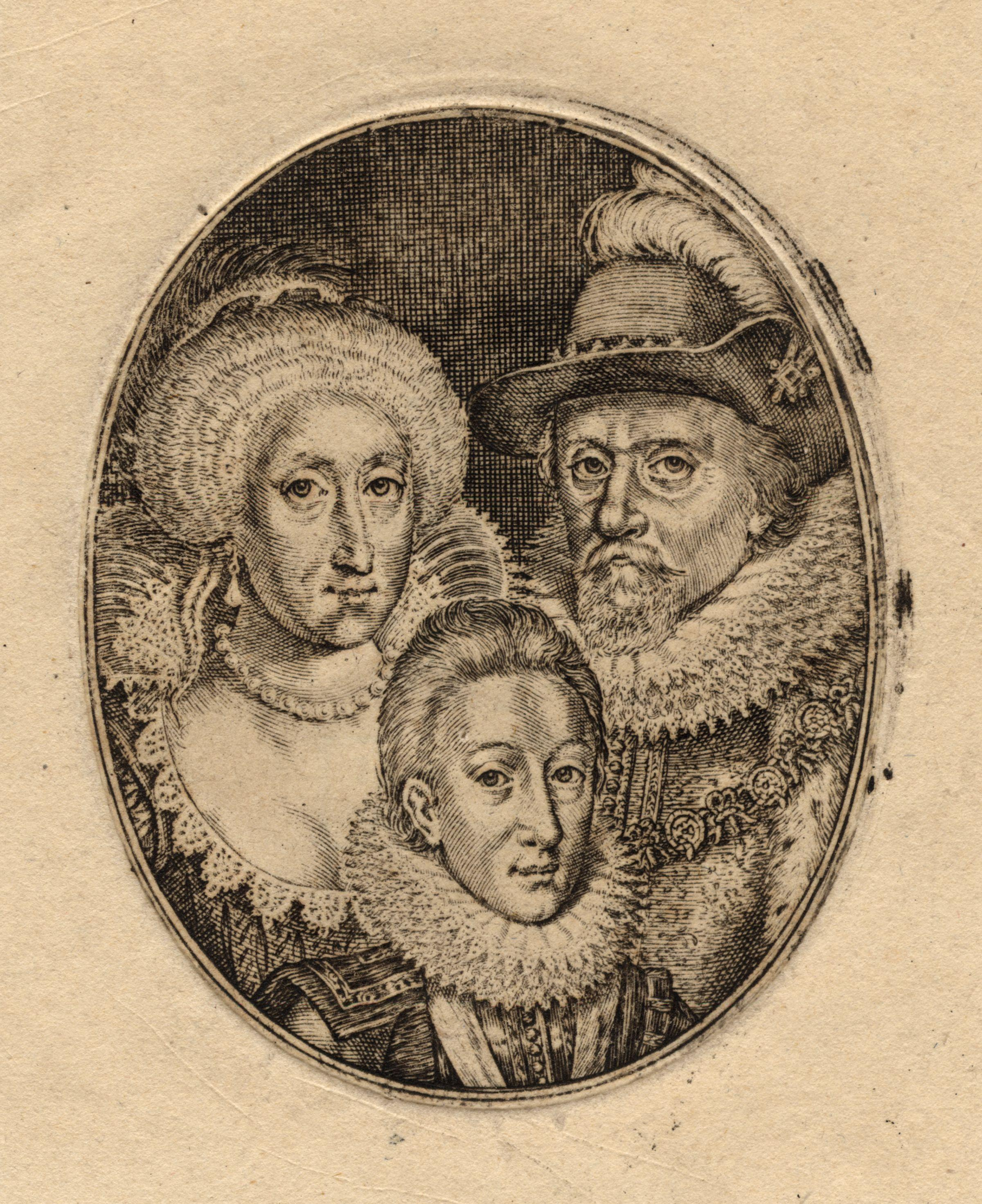
Queen Anne and King James with their second son, Charles, Duke of York, engraving by Simon de Passe

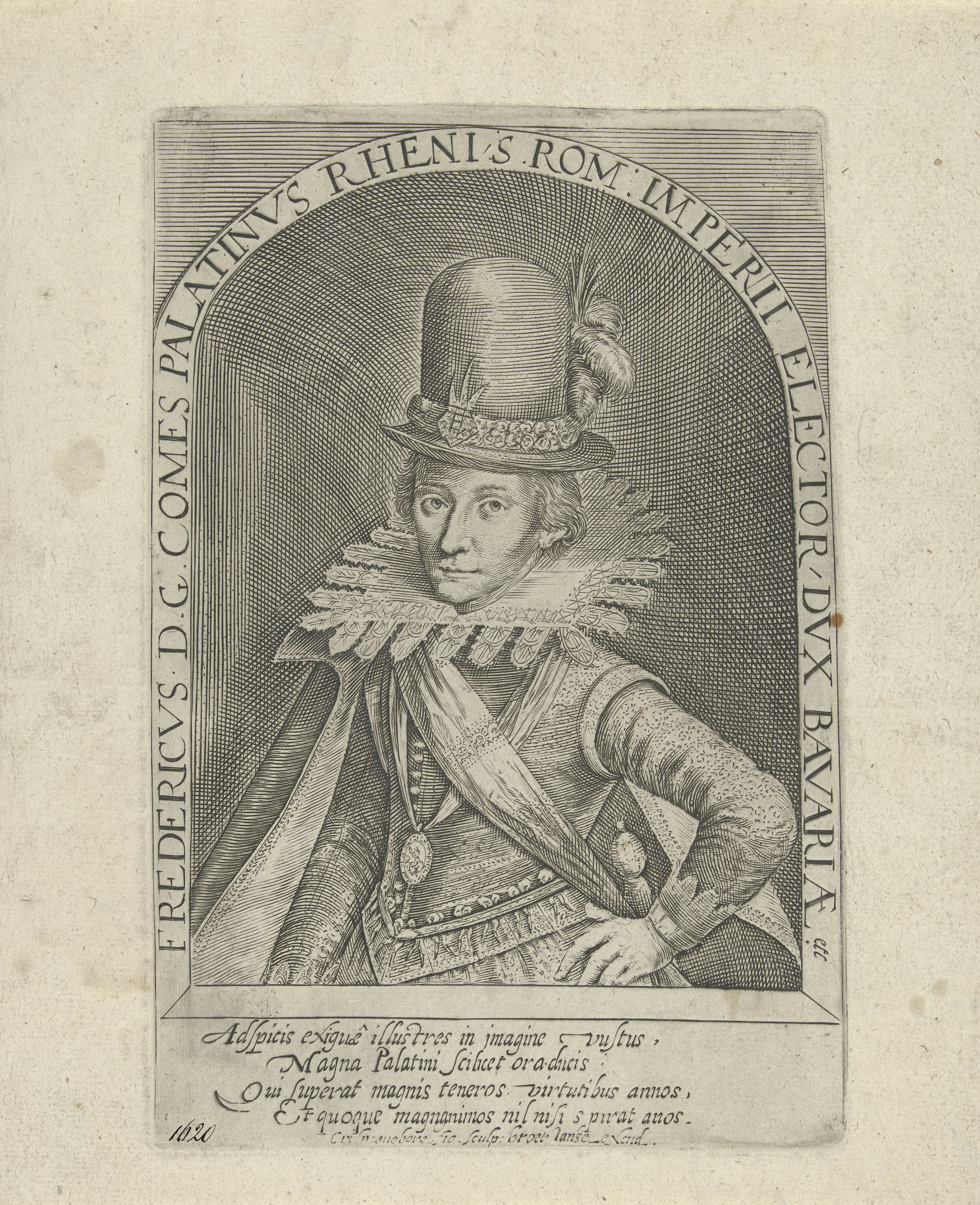
Frederick in a tall hat with an aigrette, c. 1620, Crispijn van den Queborn

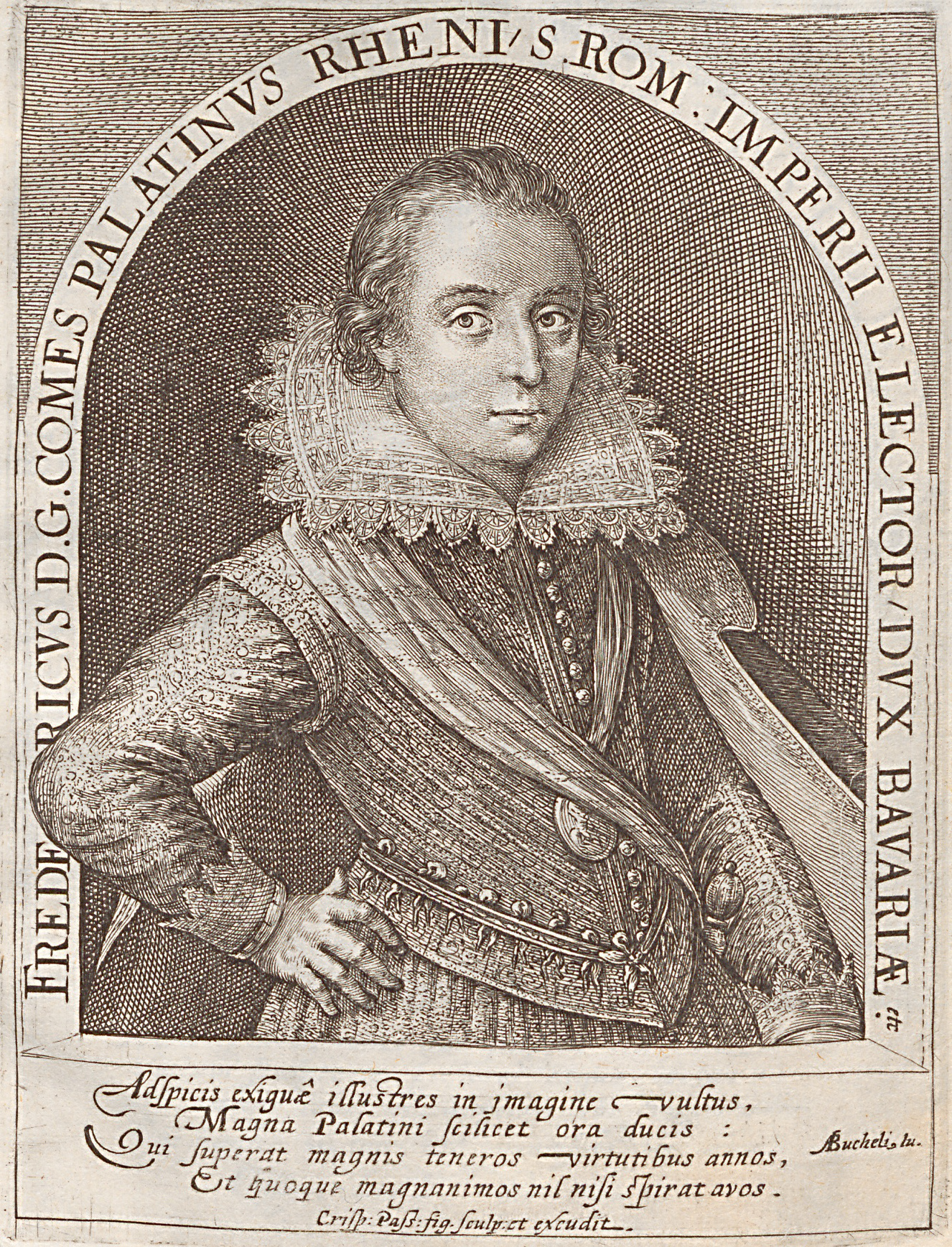
Frederick wears a medal on a ribbon and a sash, Crispijn van de Passe the elder

The wedding of Frederick V of the Palatinate (1596–1632) and Princess Elizabeth (1596–1662), daughter of King James VI and I, was celebrated in London in February 1613. There were fireworks, masques (small, choreography-based plays), tournaments, and a mock-sea battle or naumachia. Preparations involved the construction of a "Marriage room", a hall adjacent to the 1607 Banqueting House at Whitehall Palace. The events were described in various contemporary pamphlets and letters.

== Arrival of the Count Palatine ==
Frederick arrived at Gravesend on 16 October 1612. He was met by Lewes Lewknor, the master of ceremonies, and he decided to come to London by river. The Duke of Lennox brought him to the water gate of Whitehall Palace where he met Elizabeth's brother Prince Charles, Duke of York. He went into the newly built Banqueting Hall (or rather a new adjacent hall, the banqueting house had been built in 1607) to meet King James. They spoke in French, as it seems Elizabeth did not speak much German, and Frederick did not speak much English. Frederick kissed the hem of Elizabeth's dress. James took Frederick to his bedchamber and gave him a ring. He was lodged at Essex House. His companions included two counts of the House of Nassau, with Count John of Nassau or John Albrecht of Solms and Frederick Henry, Prince of Nassau.

According to popular opinion, Elizabeth's mother, Anne of Denmark, was not keen on the marriage, and believed that Elizabeth was marrying below her station, but after meeting him, "was much pleased with him". James Howell wrote that Anne called Elizabeth "Goody Palsgrave" after the wedding.

Frederick was said not to enjoy tennis, riding, or the equestrian sport of "running at the ring", but only his conversations with Princess Elizabeth. He changed his lodging to the late Lord Treasurer's house, apparently Salisbury House on the Strand.

Elizabeth's wardrobe was updated with silks and satin from Baptist Hicks and Thomas Woodward, gold lace from Christopher Weever, and John Spence made her whalebone "bodies" and farthingales. This was noted by the Venetian ambassador Antonio Foscarini as an adornment to her great natural beauty. David Murray, a Scottish poet in the household of Henry Frederick, Prince of Wales, organised the embroidery of the wedding gown. William Brothericke, an embroiderer, made hangings for the bride-chamber. A fool at court, Archibald Armstrong, was bought a crimson velvet coat with gold lace to wear at the wedding. Dionysius Pepper made a green hat for Armstrong and a black hat for the keeper of the royal leopard.

=== Death of Prince Henry ===
Prince Henry, heir to the throne, died of a fever on 6 November 1612. The wedding plans were altered in a period of mourning and grief. Some courtiers now thought Elizabeth should not marry and leave England. There were rumours that since the death of Prince Henry a Scottish faction at court advocated a marriage with the Marquess of Hamilton instead. This alternative could ensure the future of the Union as the Hamiltons also had a place in the royal succession.

King James discussed the matter with his Privy Council and the dates were brought forward. Now there would be a ceremony of espousal or marriage on 6 January and a state wedding on 14 February. Henry's death affected the entertainments at the wedding in February, as the themes of masques were invested with the political aspirations of their patrons. Henry and Elizabeth's previous plans for masques were abandoned or modified.

Frederick joined King James in the country at Royston and Theobalds. Elizabeth obtained one of her late brother's night gowns. Frederick's cook brought her a pike dressed in the German fashion. King James came back from the country and played cards with Elizabeth at Whitehall, almost every night (lost stakes are recorded in her accounts).

== January 1613 ==
The marriage contract was finalized, and in a ceremony at Whitehall on St John's Day, 27 December, Frederick took Elizabeth's hand in her bedchamber and led her to the King in the Banqueting Hall, where they kneeled on a Turkish carpet and received his blessing and then the Archbishop of Canterbury's. The letter writer John Chamberlain heard that the contracts were read out by Thomas Lake, but the poor quality of the translations made the guests laugh out loud. Frederick was in purple velvet trimmed with gold, Elizabeth wore mourning black satin with silver lace, with a cloak of black "semé velvet" (sprinkled with silver flowers or crosslets) trimmed with gold lace, and a plume of white feathers in her attire. White feathers were immediately adopted by fashionable London. Her mother was absent, suffering since Christmas from painful gout. She was being treated by the physician Théodore de Mayerne, but French diplomats thought she avoided the ceremony on purpose. After the ceremony Frederick and Prince Charles went back to wearing mourning clothes.

A Scottish courtier Viscount Fenton sent the news that the couple were now "assured" to his kinsman in Stirling, adding, "The marriage is appointed to be on Saint Valentine's day and by mere accident". King James gave orders that the court should prepare their costume for the day, and not wear mourning clothes for Henry.

Frederick gave New Year's Day gifts including medals with his portrait to the women of Elizabeth's household including Theodosia Harington. There were jewels bought in Germany, for Elizabeth "2 most rich pendant diamonds, and 2 most rich orientall pearles [sic]", a pair of earrings, which she wore in the following days, and more jewels for Queen Anne's gentlewomen and maids of honour, King James told Frederick not to overreach himself with gifts for all his servants.

Frederick ordered more gifts from Paris, including caskets of jewels, and a particularly fabulous coach for Elizabeth covered inside and out with embroidered velvet. French courtiers, and even the Queen of France visited the workshop to see it, as if it were "a precious monument". On 7 February Frederick was made a knight of the Order of Garter in St George's Chapel at Windsor Castle. Elizabeth went to stay at St James' Palace. They were both sixteen years old when they married.

Ambassadors attempted to gain advantage over rival diplomats by securing invitations to the feasts and masques. It was noted that the wife of the ambassador of the Archduke of Savoy visited Somerset House and danced before Queen Anne. The Queen was said to have warmed to Frederick, caressed him, and had ordered new livery clothes for her household. As the wedding drew near the City raised a volunteer guard of 500 musketeers.

== James Nisbet and Edinburgh's gift to Princess Elizabeth ==
The city of Edinburgh sent a gift of 10,000 merks, as promised at Elizabeth's baptism in November 1596. James Nisbet was sent to London with the cash. He presented her with a diamond necklace on the day of the wedding and the money three days later. A detailed account of his expenses survives. He had a new suit of clothes made in Edinburgh, and hired a horse from John Kinloch on 5 February. When he arrived in London he had a new taffeta cloak made up. He went to court to meet John Murray of the king's bedchamber. The King sent word that Nisbet should buy a jewel, "a carquan of diamonds of great value", to give to Elizabeth on the morning of the wedding as she waited in the gallery at Whitehall before going in procession to the Chapel Royal.

Nisbet found his linen "overlayers" to be unfashionable in London, and following strong hints about clothes and pleasing the king, he ordered new clothes to wear at the wedding in the same style as John Murray's. Robert Jousie, a Scottish merchant and courtier who had relocated to London helped him. Patrick Black, formerly a tailor to Prince Henry, made him a suit of "villouris raze" with satin and Milan passments and a velvet cloak. A ras fabric was a velvet with a short nap. The outfit included a castor hat and a satin piccadill.

Nisbet watched the fireworks from the Savoy. He had his hair cut on Friday 12 February. On Saturday he bought the necklace for Elizabeth costing £815 sterling and watched the sea-fight. On Sunday he paid half a crown to book a place to watch the wedding processions, (after giving Elizabeth her jewel). On Saturday he saw the "masquerade". He lodged in King Street, socialised with Scots in London and saw four comedies. On 29 February Nisbet went to Newmarket to say his goodbye to King James. Elizabeth sent a thank-you letter to the Provost of Edinburgh, James Nisbet's father-in-law Sir John Arnot on 24 February.

The Lord Mayor and aldermen of London gave a chain of oriental pearls worth £2000, presented to Elizabeth by the Recorder of London, Henry Montagu, possibly at the same time as Edinburgh's gift.

== Fireworks and sea-battles ==
The fireworks on Thursday 11 February were the work of John Nodes, Thomas Butler, William Betts, and William Fishenden, royal gunners. The theme was loosely based on the allegory in the first book of Edmund Spenser's The Faerie Queen, a work of 1590 celebrating the reign of Elizabeth I. The costs were administered by Roger Dalison, Lieutenant of the Royal Ordnance. The displays were mostly built on barges on the Thames, with a "fort and haven of Algiers" on land for the sea-battle, all intended to be visible from Whitehall Palace. There was a long gallery at Whitehall known as the river gallery, leading to Princess Mary's Lodging, with several large windows on to the river. There had been a comparable spectacle on the Thames in May 1610, London's Love to Prince Henry.

The poet John Taylor, known as the Water Poet, published an account of the "Fire and Water Triumphs" on Saturday, as Heaven's Blessing and Earth's Joy. His publication includes lists of fireworks attributed to each of the royal gunners. The fireworks illustrated a theme or device, involving Lady Lucida, Queen of the Amazons, who spurned the love of the magician Mango, a "Tartarian". Mango had captured Lucida and her Amazons and imprisoned them in a pavilion, watched over by a dragon. Saint George, after feasting with Lucida, was ready to effect her rescue. The fireworks began, with fiery balls shooting into the air around the pavilion. A deer hunt with dogs appeared around the pavilion, and then "artificial men" spitting flame. As the whole pavilion went up in flames, Saint George rode over a bridge to the dragon's tower, the enchanted "Tower of Brumond". The next part of the action was devised by Thomas Butler. Saint George killed the dragon on the bridge, only to awaken a sleeping giant. The giant was vanquished and told Saint George that a drink from a sacred fountain was the only way to conquer Mango. The magician travelled to the castle using an invisible flying devil, and rockets started firing from the castle. Saint George captured Mango and his conjuring sceptre (wand) and tied him to a pillar.

Then followed a further firework display, credited to John Tindall, of an assault by three ships on the Castle of Envy on an island in the Sea of Disquiet. The castle was said to be built on a mount of adders, snakes, toads, serpents, and scorpions, all emitting fire. This description may have brought to mind a garden feature of Somerset House designed for Queen Anne by Salomon de Caus, a Mount Parnassus carved with mussels and snails. This performance was not a complete success, John Chamberlain wrote, "the fireworks were reasonably well performed, all save the last castle of fire, which bred most expectation, and had most devices, but when it came to execution had worst success".

=== Sea-fight on the Thames ===
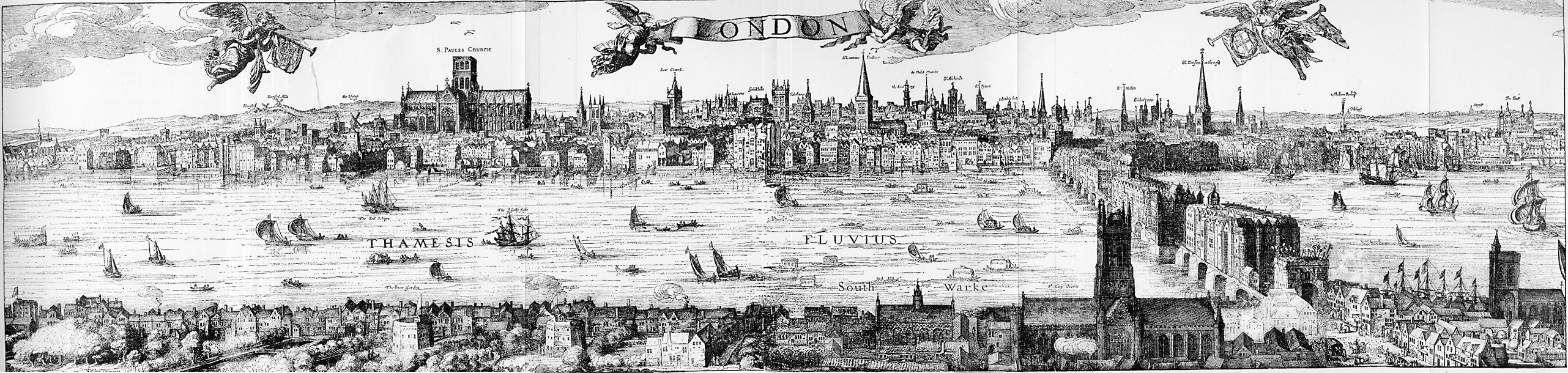
The Thames between the City and Lambeth, 1616, Claes Jansz. Visscher

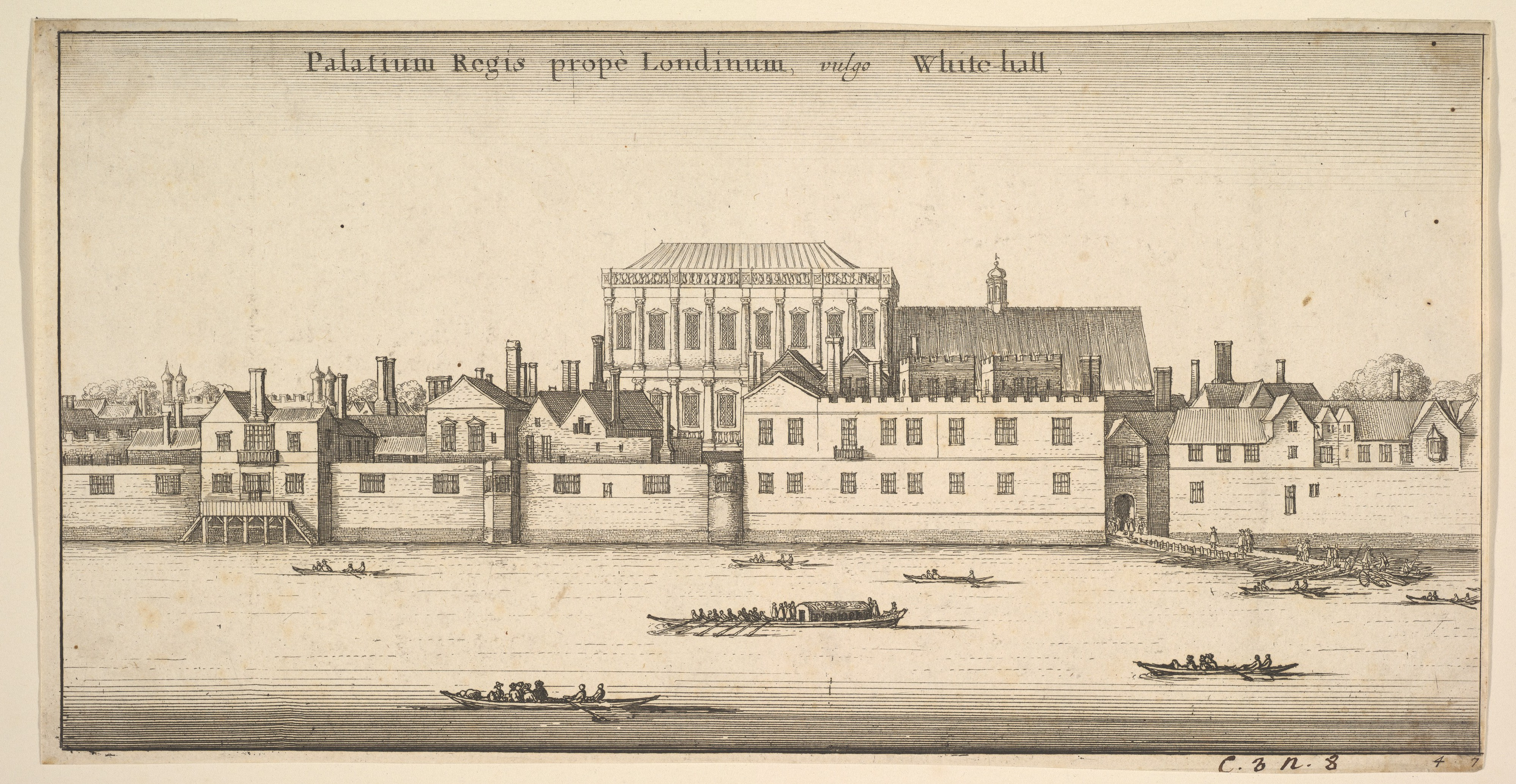
Whitehall Palace and the Thames, with the 1619 Banqueting House and the pitched roof of an adjacent hall with a belvedere, possibly the 1613 'Marriage Room' mentioned by John Chamberlain or an older Great Hall, Wenceslaus Hollar

The treasurer of the navy Robert Mansell was granted funds for "the naval fight to be had upon the river of Thames, for the more magnificent and royal solemnizing of the marriage of the Lady Elizabeth". Chamberlain calls Mansell the "Chief Commander" of the show, which was partly the work of the naval architect Phineas Pett. The battle took place on the afternoon of Saturday 13 February between Lambeth Steps and Temple stairs, with a cordon or boom of tethered boats reserving a free passage for ordinary Thames traffic. The King, the Queen, and the royal party were seated on the privy stairs at Whitehall.

The show represented a battle between Christian and Turkish ships, including a Venetian argosy or caravel captained by Phineas Pett, near a Turkish harbour and castle of Argeir of Algiers built at Stangate at Lambeth. The castle was armed with 22 cannon. A Turkish watchtower at Lambeth was set on fire. After an English victory, captives in Turkish costume (red jackets with blue sleeves) were brought by the English admiral to Whitehall, where Robert Mansell presented them to the Earl of Nottingham who took them to King James.

John Taylor thought the action resembled the Battle of Lepanto or the defeat of the Spanish Armada. John Chamberlain thought the event had fallen far short of expectation, and King James and the royals took no delight in the mere shooting of guns. Phineas Pett later wrote that he was in more danger on the Venetian argosy, which he had converted from an old pinnace, The Spy, than if he had been on active sea-service. Several soldiers and sailors or workmen had been seriously injured, and plans for a second day were abandoned.

The sea battle was said to have cost £4,800 and the fireworks on the Thames £2880. A royal debt of £693 for the "naval fight" was still unpaid three years later. A pension was granted to Otwell Astmore, who was injured or maimed during the performance.

== Wedding at Whitehall ==
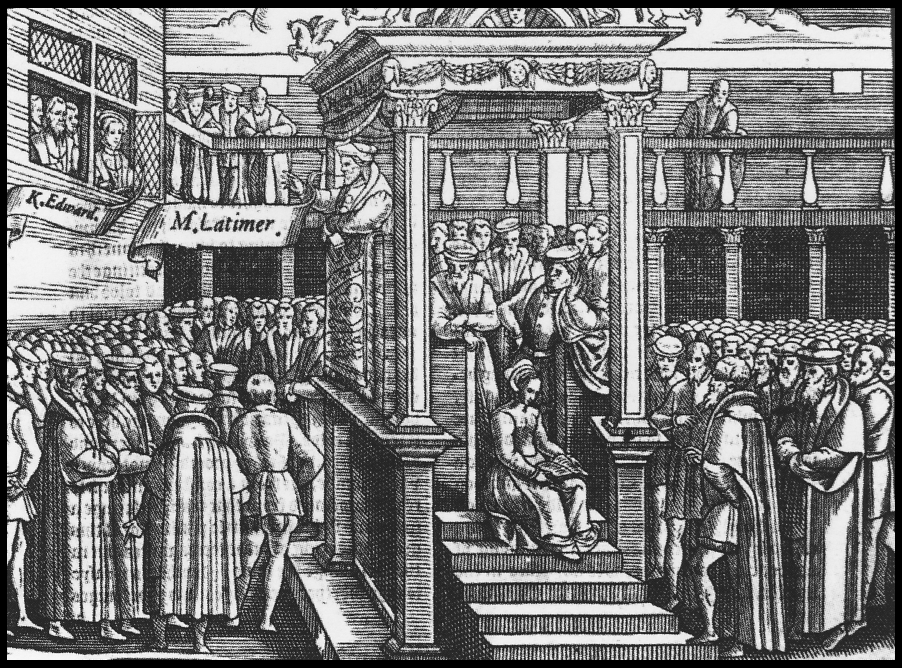
John Chamberlain was able to see the wedding procession crossing the courtyard by the Preaching Place

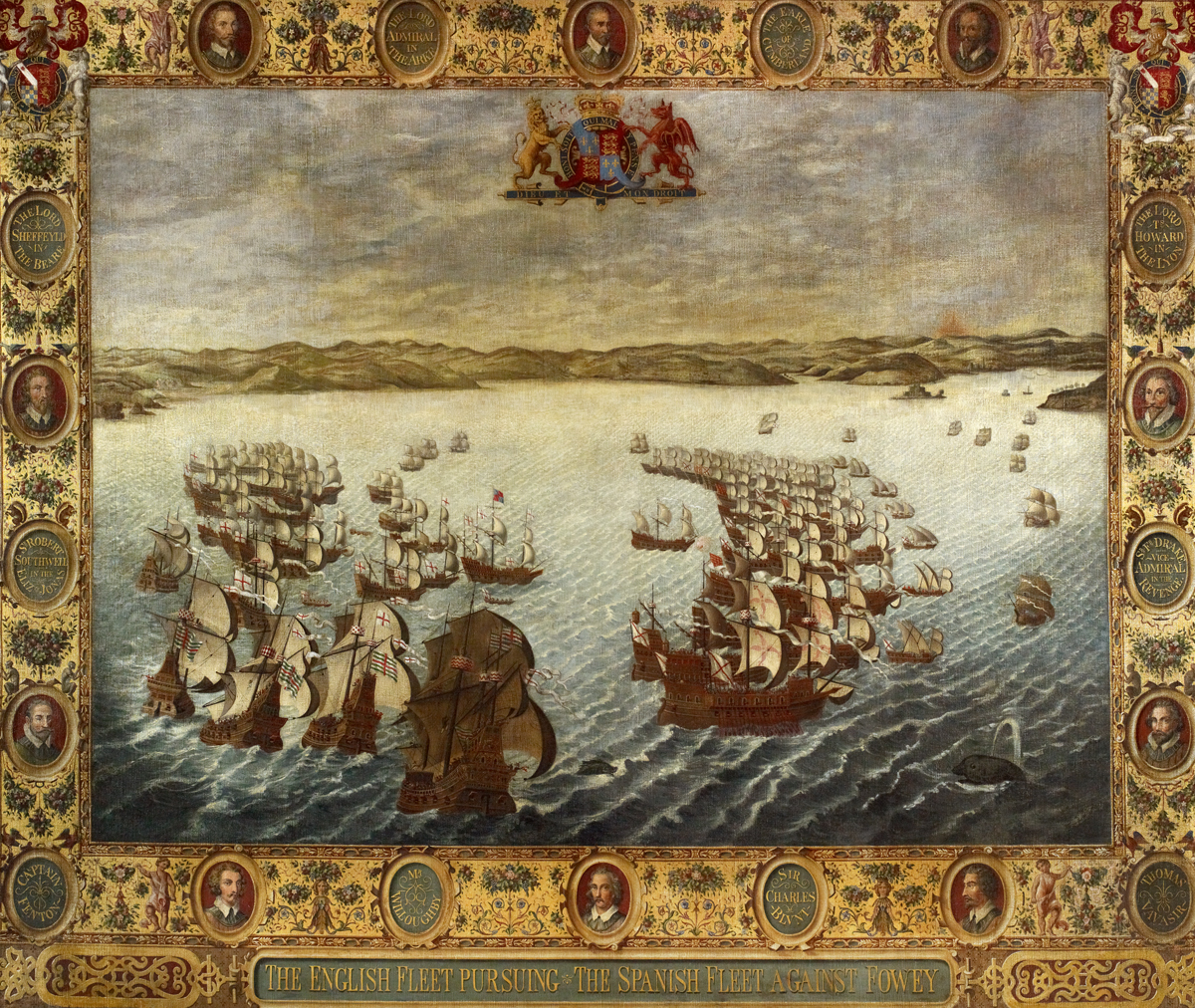
An artist's impression of one of the lost Armada Tapestries, commissioned by the Earl of Nottingham

The marriage took place on Sunday 14 February 1613 in the chapel of Whitehall Palace, which was decorated with tapestry depicting the "Acts of the Apostles". The tapestry had been bought by Henry VIII in 1542 and used to hang Westminster Abbey at the coronation of Elizabeth I.

A processional route was established around the palace so that the wedding party could be seen by more people. For the benefit of spectators around the palace and in adjacent buildings, a scaffold with a raised walkway crossed an open courtyard by the Preaching Place. King James went from the Privy Chamber through the Presence Chamber and Guard Chamber, and the new Banqueting House (or Marriage-Room), down stairs by the court gate, along the temporary walk-way, "a raised gallery conspicuous to all", to the Great Chamber and Lobby to the Closet, and down stairs to the Royal Chapel. Frederick went from the Banqueting Hall, and then Elizabeth, preceded by her tutor or guardian Lord Harington.

John Chamberlain was able to glimpse the procession from a pre-booked window of the Whitehall Jewel House or Revel's House. He saw the bride go from the stairs at the gallery by the Preaching Place onto the "terrace" or walkway, which he described as "a long stage or gallery which ran along the court into the hall". He thought King James was "somewhat strangely attired in a cap and feather, with a Spanish cape and a long stocking". He also noted that the daughters of the Earl of Northumberland and the Catholic Lord Montagu were very well dressed, a public show of loyalty when the groom was a leading Protestant prince.

Elizabeth wore an imperial crown (but not with closed arches) set with diamonds and pearls, shining on her amber hair, let down to her waist, and dressed with rolls of gold spangles, pearls, precious stone and diamonds. Her white gown was richly embroidered by the workshop of Edward Hillyard. Some accounts say the white costume was made of cloth of silver. The mercer Robert Grigge had provided fabric for eleven "bryde maydens". 14 or 15 (likely 16) ladies dressed in white satin like the bride held her train.

Queen Anne's page Piero Hugon brought a jewel for Elizabeth to wear. The Venetian ambassador Foscarini noted that Elizabeth was wearing a diamond necklace, probably the one bought by James Nisbet. He wrote that there were 8 daughters of earls on either side of her train. Anne, dressed in white satin, had a great number of pear-shaped pearls in her hair, and was ablaze with diamonds. Her jewels were thought to be worth £400,000. The hairstyles of the queen and her daughter were represented accordingly in a contemporary engraving of the wedding procession. Roger Wilbraham wrote, "the Court abounding in jewels and embroidery beyond custom or reason: God grant money to pay debts". According to a surviving record, the wedding of Elizabeth and Frederick, cost £93,293 in total, which equates to approximately £9,131,518 today.

The Archbishop of Canterbury officiated. Elizabeth was nervous during the ceremony and could not help laughing. Afterwards the guests drank spiced hippocras wine. Dinner for the bride and bridegroom with the ambassadors was served in the new purpose-built room, which was hung with tapestry depicting the defeat of the Spanish Armada. This apparently tactless gesture was noted by Luisa Carvajal y Mendoza.

The event was celebrated in John Donne's Epithalamion, or Mariage Song on the Lady Elizabeth, and Count Palatine being married on St Valentines Day.

Hail Bishop Valentine, whose day this is,

All the air is thy diocese,
And all the chirping choristers

And other birds are thy parishioners

... ...

The feast, with gluttonous delays,

Is eaten, and too long their meat they praise,
The masquers come late, and I think, will stay,
Like fairies, till the cock crow them away.
Alas, did not antiquity assign
A night, as well as day, to thee, O Valentine?

In Donne's Epithalamium, Elizabeth and Frederick were two phoenixs who became one.

Frederick and Elizabeth were called to become prominent Protestant leaders in Europe, and much of the literature performed at the reception carried religious overtones. Literature celebrated the union as "a triumph over the evil of popery". Elizabeth and Frederick were both "zealous Protestants", and the public called upon Frederick to be a leader among the Protestants. Much of the poetry recited at the wedding reception emphasized these political and religious desires, and Frederick was encouraged to become the next great Protestant leader, one that would unite European Protestant countries and bring an end to the Roman Catholic influence.

== Three masques at Whitehall ==
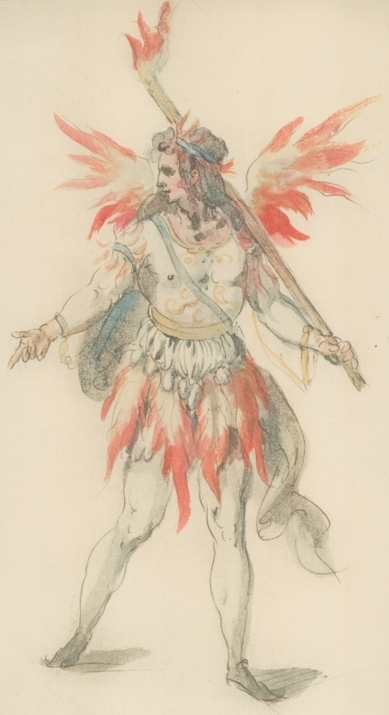
Costume drawing by Inigo Jones for a fiery spirit page in the Lord's Masque.

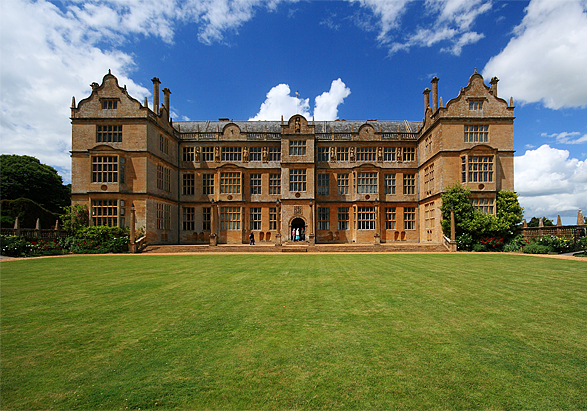
Edward Phelips produced the Memorable Masque which delighted King James, and built Montacute House as a country retreat

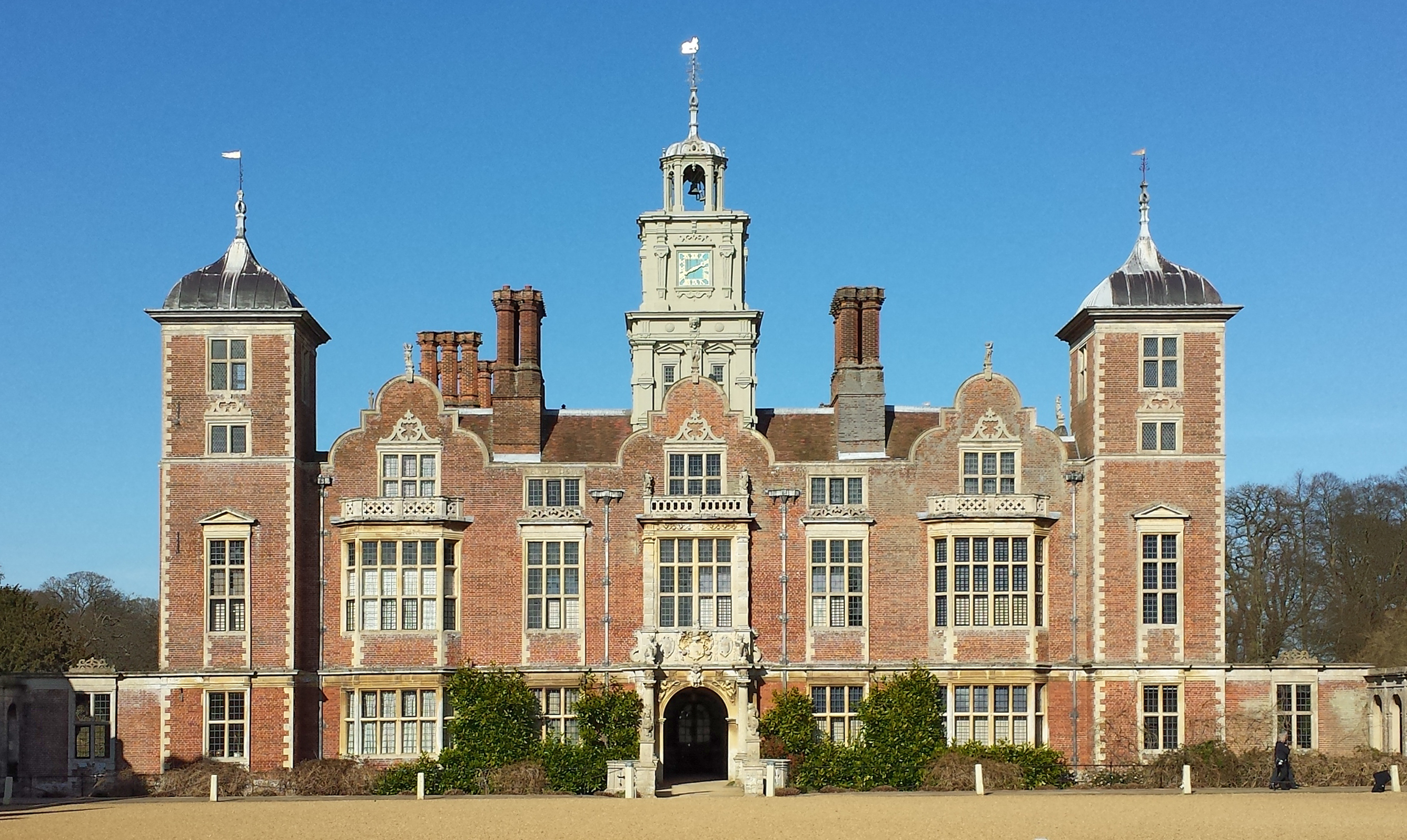
Henry Hobart's country estate was at Blickling in Norfolk

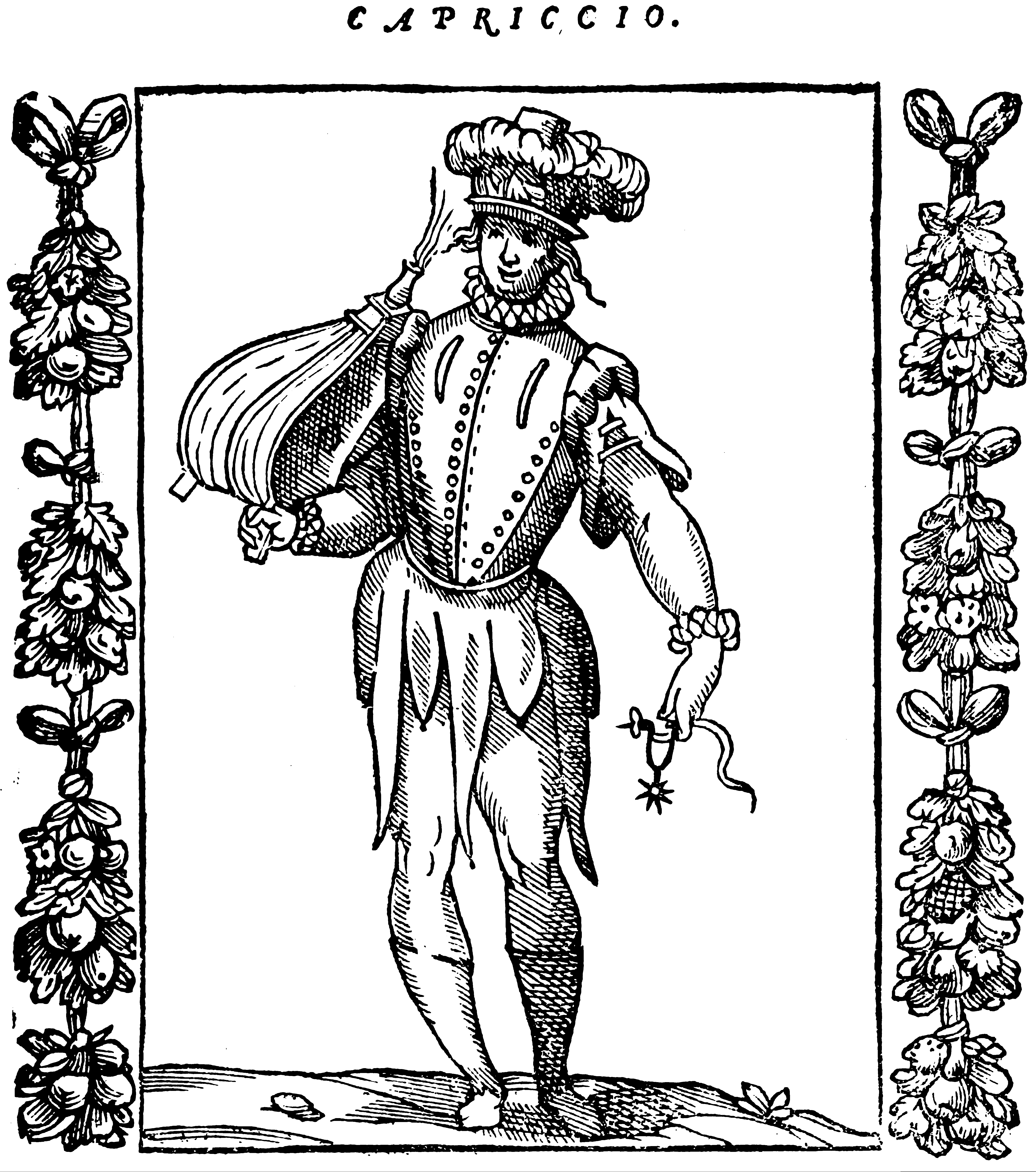
Capriccio, woodcut by Cesare Ripa

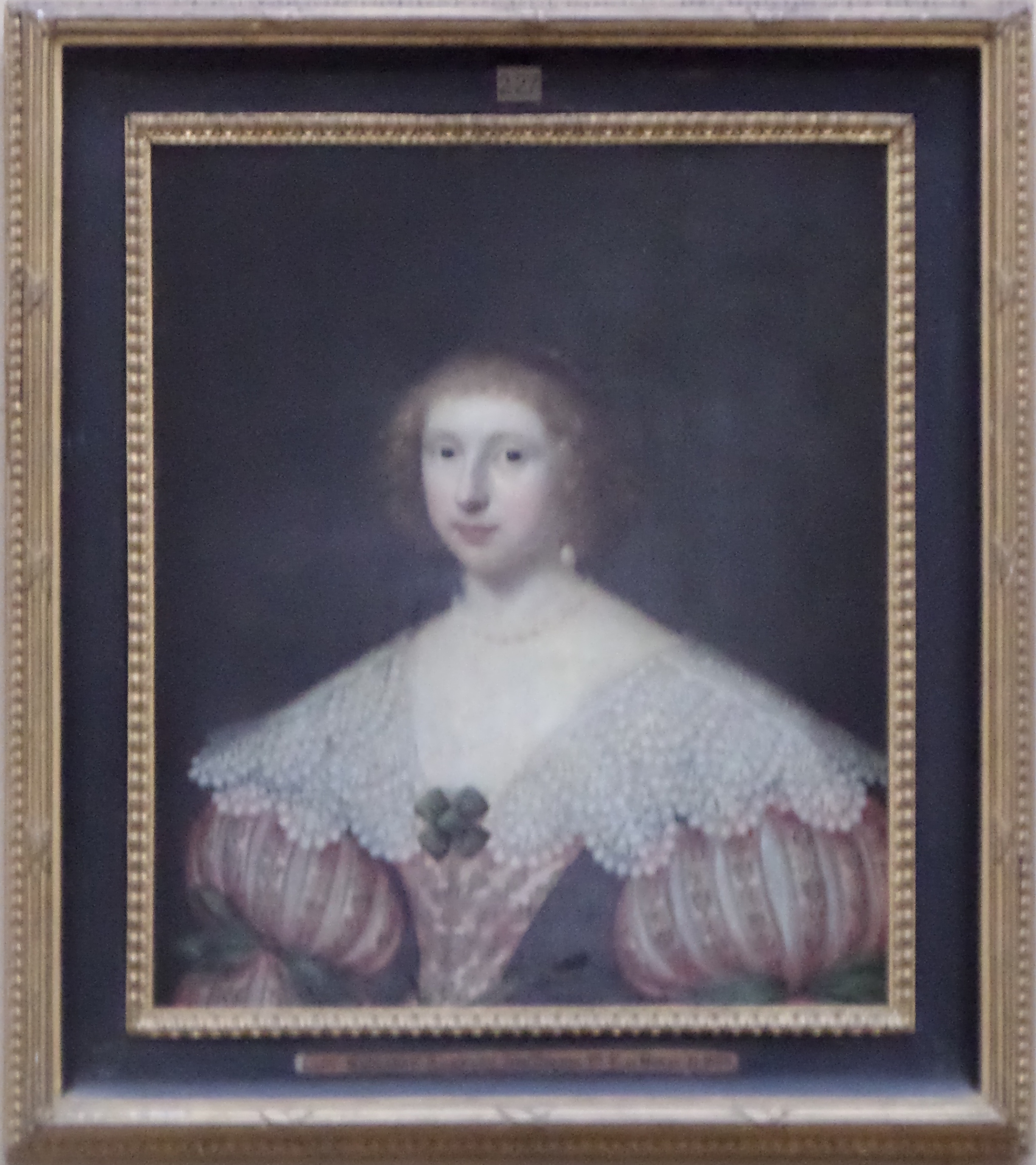
Margaret Howard, Countess of Nottingham, who insisted on precedence, by Cornelius Johnson (Dunrobin Castle)

=== Stars and Statues: The Lord's Masque ===
After the wedding, on 14 February, a masque by Thomas Campion was presented in the Banqueting House at Whitehall Palace. The patron of The Masque of Lords and Honourable Maids, as John Finet named it, was Lord Knollys. A woodland scene in the lower part of the stage was revealed, and Orpheus and Mania had a dialogue. Mania and her twelve companion "franticks" danced a "mad measure" and left the stage to Entheus, a distracted poet. He spoke with Orpheus, and Prometheus was revealed in the upper part of the stage, with eight masquers dressed as stars on moving clouds designed by Inigo Jones. There was a song, imploring the stars to come on down:

Large grow their beams, their near approach afford them so
By nature sights that pleasing are, can not too amply show;
Oh might these flames in human shapes descend to grace this place,
How lovely would their presence be, their forms how full of grace!

Sixteen fiery pages with torches danced below, and then waited to attend the male masque star dancers. As these masquers descended in a cloud, the woodland scene changed to reveal four silver women, dancers turned to stone by Jove, in niches built according to the canons of classical architecture but gilded and set with jewels. The statues came to life, and the niches were replenished with another four women, who came to life. The masquers danced two dances together, then drew the bride and groom to dance with them. The scene changed to a classical perspective with gold statues of the couple, and a central obelisk which served as Sybilla's needle. Sybilla delivered her message in Latin, prophesying Elizabeth's imperial destiny in the union of British and German peoples. The costumes were also designed by Inigo Jones, whose source material included a 1589 pageant or intermezzi in Florence celebrating the wedding of Christina of Lorraine and Ferdinando I de' Medici, Grand Duke of Tuscany.

Campion's Lord's Masque was published in 1616. One song from Campion's masque, "Woo her and win her" was separately published with its music, including the lines:

Woo her and win her, he that can, Each woman hath two lovers;
So she must take and leave a man, Till time more grace discovers;
Courtship and music suit with love, They both are works of passion;
Happy is he whose words can move, Yet sweet notes help persuasion.

Opinions on the performance were mixed. The ambassador Foscarini thought the masque was very beautiful and he was impressed by Inigo Jones' mechanism to make the stars dance. John Chamberlain was not invited to the Lord's Masque, but heard "no great commendation". A wardrobe account includes several items for this masque, costumes for five masquers with speaking parts were made by Thomas Watson.

Further celebrations included the performances of The Memorable Masque of the Middle Temple and Lincoln's Inn by George Chapman, and The Masque of the Inner Temple and Gray's Inn by Francis Beaumont. The Temple and the Inns were associations of lawyers in London who trained the sons of aristocrats. Beaumont's masque was set up in the Banqueting Hall but delayed till the 20 February. Chamberlain wrote that entry to these events was not allowed to ladies wearing a farthingale, to gain space. Both the Banqueting Hall and the Great Hall already had more scaffolds and temporary seating than usual. Twelve farthingales had been supplied by Robert Hughes for attendants at the wedding, six of taffeta and six of damask with wire and silk, and John Spens made five farthingales of changing taffeta for masque dancers.

=== Tournament: Running at the Ring ===
On Monday 15 February there was a tournament of tilting and running at the ring at Whitehall. Elizabeth, her mother, and aristocratic women watched from the Banqueting House. King James rode first. The task was the lift a hoop with a spear or lance. Prince Charles did particularly well. The performances of expert riders were appreciated for taking the ring with "much strangeness".

=== Colonialism as entertainment ===
Chapman's Memorable Masque was performed in the Great Hall of Whitehall Palace on 15 February. The roof of the hall and its cupola can be seen in Wenceslaus Hollar's engraving of the palace. The masquers arrived in procession and King James made them go around the tilt yard for the benefit of the royal audience. The Memorable Masque was produced for the Inns of Court by Edward Phelips, the Master of the Rolls and Richard Martin, a lawyer who worked for the Virginia Company, with Christopher Brooke, and the Attorney General, Henry Hobart of Blickling. Edward Phelips paid Inigo Jones £110 for his work on the masque.

Prince Henry had been George Chapman's patron, and was interested in Virginia, and a settlement Henricus had been named in his honour. Phelips had been Henry's chancellor and was a director of the Virginia Company. Martin Butler detects in the masque the kind of colonial ambition which Henry had preferred, but King James would avoid for its potential for conflict with Spain. Possibly, George Chapman and Francis Beaumont had been preferred as authors in 1612 by Prince Henry, looking for writers sympathetic to his ideals.

The masque represented Virginian peoples on the stage, while introducing the theme of gold mining from Guiana based on the voyages of Walter Ralegh, conflating two colonial ventures. Chapman had responded to the promise of Guiana's gold and imperial venture in 1596 with a poem, De Guiana, Carmen Epicum. In the poem Chapman outlines a female and Elizabethan England that would be a sibling and a mother to Guiana in "a golden world".

A marshal attending the performers and audience, "Baughan", was probably the usher of Queen Anne, who had previously fought with Edward Herbert over a hair ribbon worn by a maid of honour, Mary Middlemore. A drawing by Inigo Jones for a torchbearer at the masque, held at Chatsworth, shows a man wearing a feathered head dress, derived partly from a woodcut of Cesare Vecellio.

The procession to the palace was led by 50 gentlemen, followed by mock-baboons, actors in Neapolitan suits and great ruffs. The musicians arrived in triumphal cars adorned with mask-heads, festoons, and scrolls. They were dressed as "Virginean priests" with "strange hoods of feathers and scallops about their necks" and "turbans, stuck with several-coloured feathers". The masquers were dressed in "Indian habits" as "Virginian Princes". Their feathers and head attires were bought from a haberdasher, Robert Johns. They wore olive-coloured masks, and their hair was "black and large waving down to their shoulders". Each horse was attended by two "Moores", African servants, who were dressed as Indian slaves. Foscarini wrote that there were 100 Africans, dressed in the blue and gold costume of Indian slaves.

The scene in the hall, designed by Inigo Jones, was a rock with winding staircases visibly veined with gold. On one side was a silver temple of fame, on the other a grove with a vast hollow tree, the resort of baboons. Plutus the deity of wealth spoke, and the rock opened. The Priests sang and a gold mine was revealed. Plutus compared rocks to flinty-hearted ladies. The wit Capriccio entered with bellows, metallurgy in mind, and to swell his head, an image from an emblem of Cesare Ripa. He spoke of an island in the South sea, Paena, perhaps Bermuda although Virginia was commonly called an "isle". Plutus challenged him for stealing from his mine. A troop of baboons entered and danced, then returned to the tree. Honor called forth the Virgin Knights, and so twelve masquers appeared, the "Virginian Princes". The final song was A Hymne to Hymen, for the most time-fitted Nuptials of our thrice gracious Princess Elizabeth.

The masque advocates the religious conversion of the Virginians before the extraction of mineral wealth. "King James and all his company were exceedingly pleased, and especially with their dancing", so Chamberlain heard, and the King praised the Masters of the Inns, "and strokes", or gives "thanks to", "the Master of the Rolls and Dick Martin, who were chief doers and undertakers". Edward Phelips had to deal with one lawyer who refused to return his masque costume.

=== Olympic Knights ===
Student lawyers at the Inns wrote to their parents for money to contribute to the masques at the wedding. Francis Bacon was responsible for Beaumont's masque. The masquers approached the palace on the river (twice, because the exhausted King dismissed them the first time). The Olympic Games were staged for the marriage of Thames and Rhine, on Mount Olympus. Once again, statues encased in gold and silver were returned to life. The next scene was a country May dance with servants and baboons. Then the upper part of the mountain was revealed with two pavilions bedecked with the armoury of fifteen Olympian knights. The knights came down the mountain, danced, and when a song invited each of them to catch a nymph, they danced with ladies from the audience.

On 21 February there was a banquet in a new dining room adjacent to the Whitehall Banqueting House, over the North Terrace. The bill was paid by the Lords who had failed at the running of the ring, each contributing £30. Chamberlain called the venue the new Marriage-Room, which was suitable for dining and dancing. He said the masquers from the Inns of Court were invited (perhaps they dined in Banqueting House). On 22 February King James left London for Theobalds. Anne went to Greenwich Palace on 26 February. Charles and the Elector went to Cambridge, and Newmarket where the royal lodging started to subside while James was in bed.

Nothing more was heard of a masque planned by Elizabeth and her entourage, to involve herself and fifteen maidens, mentioned by Antonio Foscarini in October 1612, and probably abandoned after the death of Prince Henry. An account of the festivals published in Heidelberg omits Beaumont's masque and quotes instead in French from what must be Prince Henry's planned masque. This entertainment is now known as the Masque of Truth. It would have been more overtly religious than the others, featuring the union of the world with England in reformed Protestant faith. The Queen of Africa would have been presented to truth personified, Alethiea.

The master of court ceremony, John Finet later published his observations, which detail the complicated struggles between ambassadors for precedence. He noted a confrontation between the French ambassador's wife and the Scottish Countess of Nottingham, who already enjoyed a reputation for international incidents. As the ambassador's wife was directed to a place at dinner deemed inappropriate by the Countess, she grasped her hand and would not let her go all through the meal.

== Departure ==
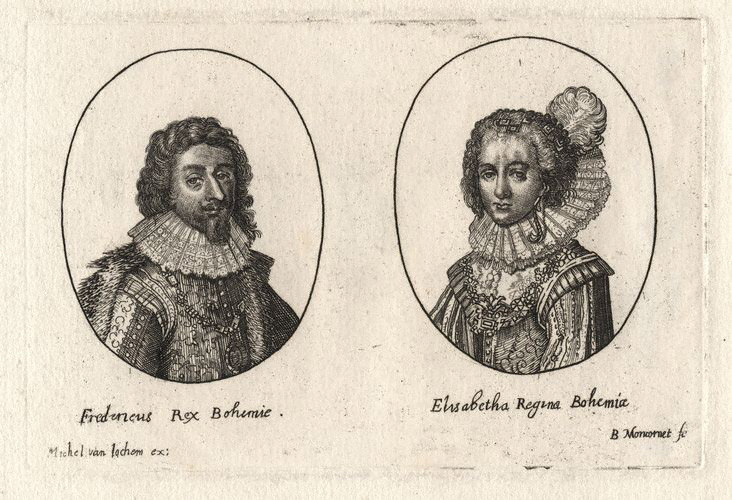
Elizabeth and Frederick, c. 1620, Balthasar Moncornet

There was some controversy over the continued entertainment of Frederick and the expense. On 24 February Anne, Frederick and Elizabeth attended the christening of the daughter of the Countess of Salisbury. The next day the luxurious coach that Frederick had ordered in Paris arrived. The coach became the responsibility of her Scottish Master of Horse Andrew Keith. Keith later got into a fight at Heidelberg.

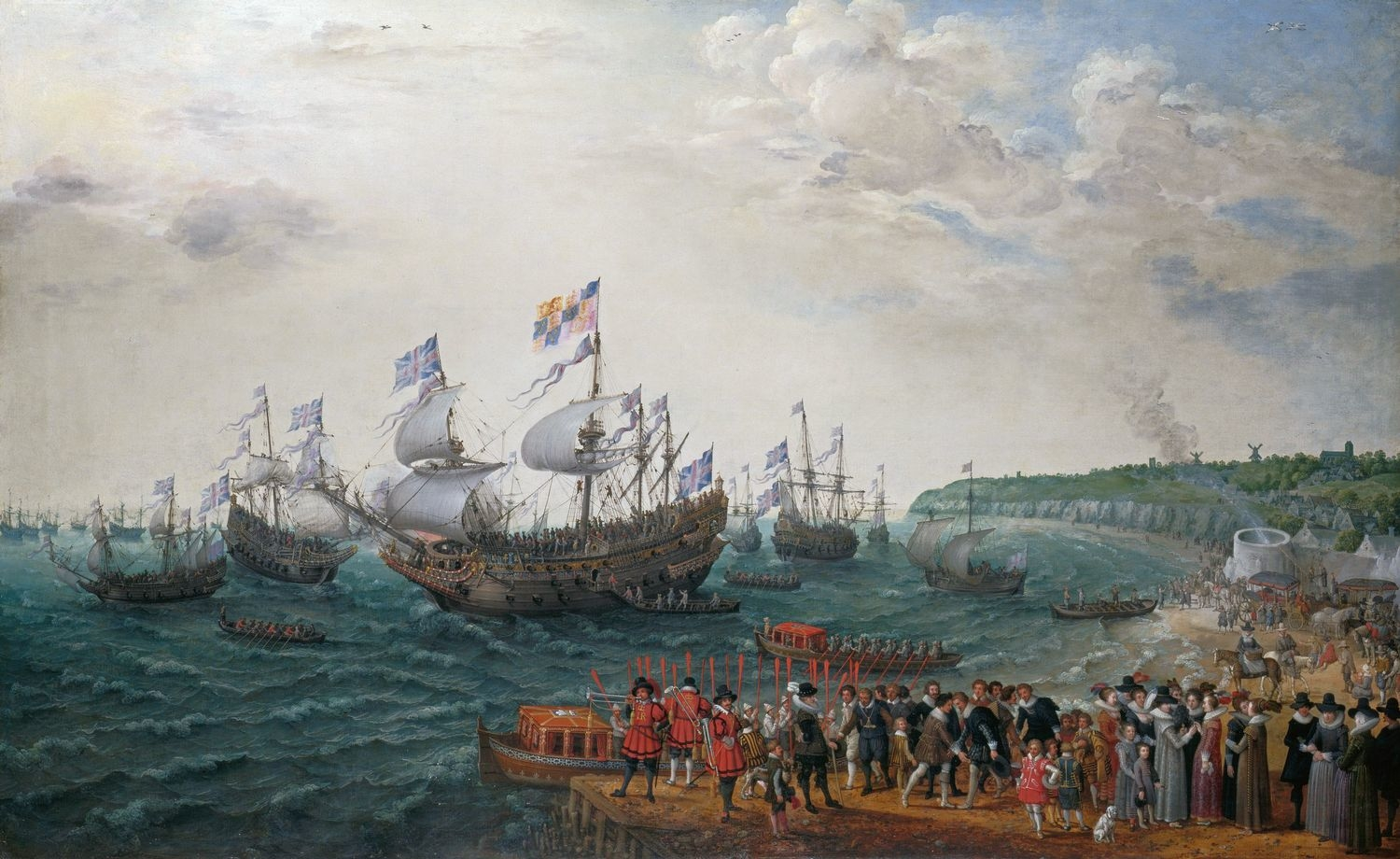
Embarkation at Margate, Adam Willaerts (painted 1623), Royal Collection

On 10 April Anne and Elizabeth travelled from Whitehall to Greenwich, and then to Rochester. The voyage was delayed, and she went with Prince Charles to Canterbury for a week. Charles returned to London, and Elizabeth and Frederick went to Margate. They sailed on the 26 April on The Prince Royal. Elizabeth left England accompanied by Lady Harington, the Countess of Arundel, and Anne Dudley as chief lady of honour. James Sandilands was her Master of Household. The other English ships, under the command of the Earl of Nottingham, were The Anne Royall, The Repulse, The Red Lion, The Phoenix, The Assurance, and The Disdain, with the frigate Primrose two smaller pinnaces The George, a transporter, and The Charles. There were five merchant ships, the Triall, William, Dorcas, and Joan.

The size of Elizabeth's household in Germany had been agreed in October, with 49 posts, but she took many more companions. The whole party numbered 675. A list of her companions includes "Mr Pettye" and "Mr Johnes", Inigo Jones, among the followers of the Earl of Arundel. Musicians included Richard Gibbons and the harp player Daniel Callander.

Her jeweller Jacob Harderet also made the trip to Heidelberg. Elizabeth had obtained a number of jewels and had to write to Sir Julius Caesar to pay the bill for jewels and rings given as presents at her leave taking in England. She reminded him of the demands of royal etiquette, "You do know that is fitting for my quality at the time of my parting from my natural country to leave some small remembrance of me amongst my affectionate friends, but that any thing employed for my use should remain unpaid doth not well become my quality".

Soon after Elizabeth's departure, Queen Anne went to Bath, and at Bristol on 4 June was entertained by another representation of a battle with a Turkish galley.

In May the actor-manager John Heminges was paid by the Lord Treasurer for putting on fourteen or more plays including Much Ado About Nothing for Elizabeth, Frederick, and Charles at Whitehall. The dates of these performances were not recorded. It is sometimes stated that Much Ado About Nothing was performed on or near the wedding day, but there is no evidence for this. The other plays at Whitehall mentioned in Heminges' warrant were; The Knot of Fools, The Maid's Tragedy, The Merry Devil of Edmonton, The Tempest, A King and No King, The Twins Tragedy, The Winter's Tale, Sir John Falstaff, The Moor of Venice, The Nobleman, Caesar's Tragedy, and Love Lies a Bleeding.

== Journey to Heidelberg ==
The fleet arrived at Ostend on 27 April 1613. Maurice, Prince of Orange, Manuel, Hereditary Prince of Portugal, and Henry of Nassau joined them from Vlissingen. The couple were rowed ashore the next day. Princess Elizabeth's female attendants on her arrival at Vlissingen on 29 April 1613 were listed as the Countess of Arundel, Lady Harington, Theodosia, Lady Cecil, Mistress Anne Dudley, Mistress Elizabeth Dudley, Mistress Apsley, and Mistress (Mary) Mayerne.

=== Vlissingen and Middleburg ===
Arrangements for the reception of the royal party at Vlissingen and Middelburg were made by the soldier John Throckmorton. He was concerned over the details of their arrival by water and landing from "long boats", and found that suitable long boats for such a ceremony were not available. He reported the disappointment of an official, James de Maldere, President of Zeeland, who did not receive a gift from Elizabeth. Throckmorton advised Viscount Lisle to send a jewel or ring with Elizabeth's portrait. Throckmorton's wife Dorothy joined Elizabeth on the journey to Heidelberg.

=== The Hague ===
Frederick left for The Hague. Elizabeth went to Middelburg, then Dort and Rotterdam and rejoined Frederick at The Hague. On 8 May Frederick went ahead to Heidelberg. She received gifts from the States General of jewellery, linen, Chinese lacquer furniture for a cabinet room, and two suites of tapestry woven at the workshop of François Spierincx.

Elizabeth, after a few days went to Leiden and Haarlem where the city authorities presented her with a cradle and baby-linen. At Amsterdam she was welcomed at an arch depicting Thetis and she was given gold plate. Next she went to Utrecht, then Rhenen and Arnhem. On 20 May she reached Emmerich am Rhein and then went to Düsseldorf, Cologne, and Bonn. A report of her journey mentions the seven hills of the Siebengebirge, and a legend that the Devil walks in a castle there, "and holds his Infernal Revels". A story about a castle near Koblenz, where a medieval bishop was eaten was by rats, was also included.

=== Rhine voyage ===
After a picnic she boarded a luxurious boat on the Rhine, and at Bacharach Frederick joined her. They arrived at Gaulsheim in the Palatinate on 3 June. Here Elizabeth found she had to give gifts to companions now returning to England, and she obtained jewels on credit from Jacob Harderet. At Oppenheim, they took carriages to Frankenthal, where there was a ceremony of Royal Entry. The townspeople dressed as "Turks, Poles, & Switzers" and at night there was a candlelit show of Solomon and Queen of Sheba. The following night's entertainment was the Siege of Troy. Frederick rode on ahead to Heidelberg in order to welcome his bride. Elizabeth arrived on 7 June to a week of elaborate court festival.

On 13 June there was a tournament of "mad fellows with tubs set on their heads, apparelled all in straw, and sitting on horse back", and the next day the Duke of Lennox, the Earl and Countess of Arundel, and others departed.
