= Minster Lovell Priory =

Priory in Minster Lovell, England

Coordinates: 51.8002°N 1.5329°W

Minster Lovell Priory was a priory in Minster Lovell, Oxfordshire, England. Its current site is lost, though it is thought to have been west of St Kenelm's parish church and Minster Lovell Hall.
