= Elizabeth Apsley =

English courtier (d. 1626)

Elizabeth Apsley, Lady Morton (died 1626) was an English courtier and a companion to Elizabeth Stuart, Queen of Bohemia.

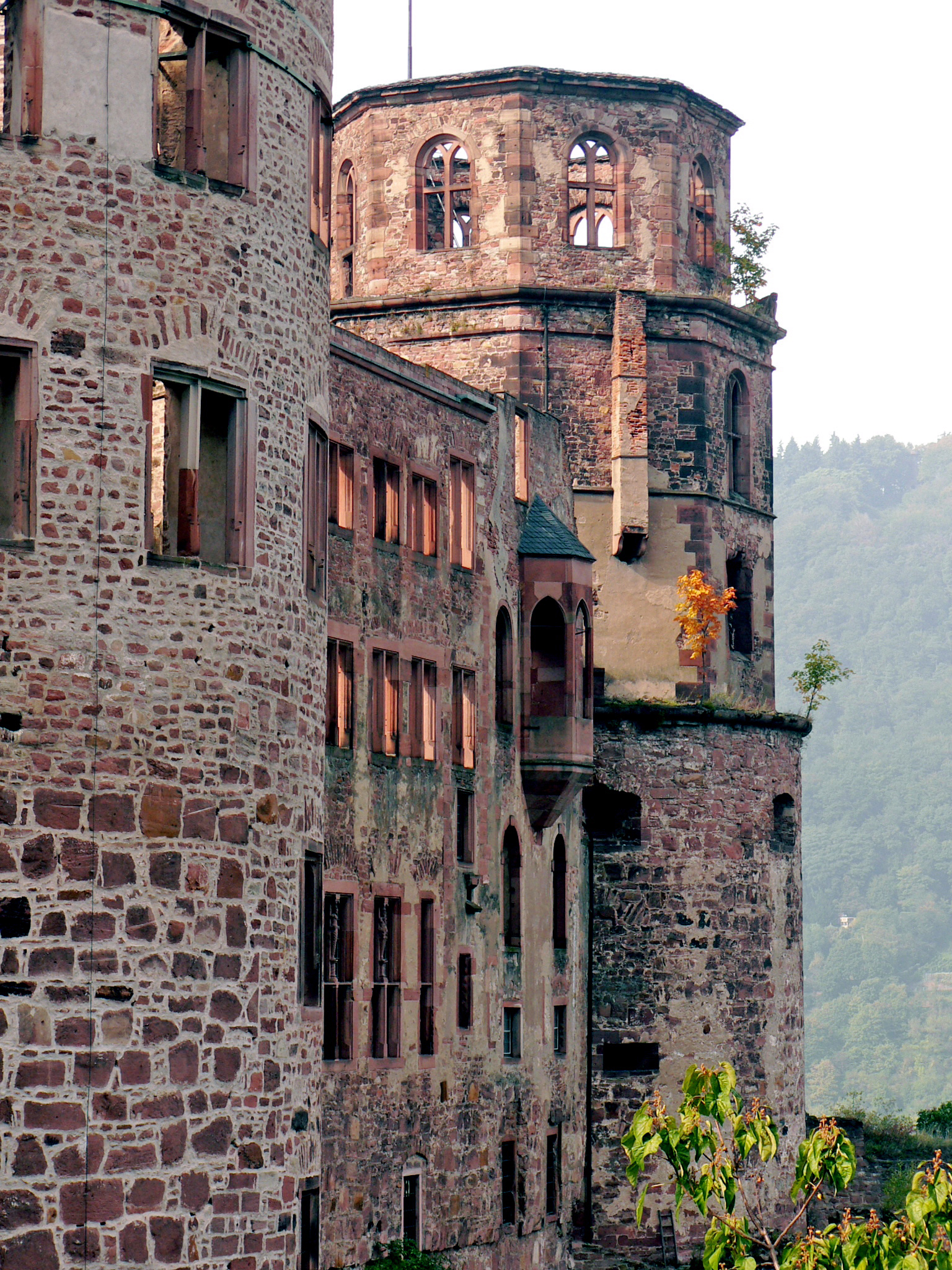
Elizabeth Apsley was said to be charge of monkeys and dogs at Heidelberg

== Family and early life ==
She was the eldest daughter of Sir Edward Apsley (died 1620) of Thakeham and Warminghurst, Sussex and Elizabeth Elmes (died 1640) of Lilford.

She was a distant cousin of Lucy Hutchinson. Her mother, Elizabeth, Lady Apsley, was a friend of Lady Anne Clifford and Sir Charles Montagu. Her sister, Anne Apsley, married Matt Caldicott from Selmeston, a servant of the Earl of Dorset. A brother, Edward Apsley (1605-1651) was at Christ's College, Cambridge in the care of Joseph Mead.

== Career at court ==
Elizabeth and her sister, Alice, who later married Sir John Butler of Teston, were maids of honour to Elizabeth Stuart and travelled with her in 1613 to Heidelberg after her marriage to Frederick V of the Palatinate. Princess Elizabeth's female attendants on her arrival at Vlissingen on 29 April 1613 were listed as the Countess of Arundel, Lady Harington, Lady Cecil, Mistress Anne Dudley, Mistress Elizabeth Dudley, Mistress Apsley, and Mistress (Mary) Mayerne.

Alice or Elizabeth, or both sisters, quarreled with Anne, Lady Schönberg (died 1615). Princess Elizabeth wrote to Lady Apsley vindicating Apsley, "although I love Schonberg verie well".

In 1618, Elizabeth Apsley was given the responsibility of looking after Princess Elizabeth's monkeys at Heidelberg, a gift from Dudley Carleton. She was dubbed "Gouvernante to all the monkeys and dogs at the palace".

== Marriage ==
She returned to England to marry Albertus Morton in November 1624. Morton fell off his horse on the way to meet her at Gravesend. They were married on 13 January 1625 at Eton.

Elizabeth, Lady Morton and her mother corresponded with Elizabeth Stuart. The princes Henry Frederick and Rupert also wrote to Lady Morton and her mother.

Princess Elizabeth wrote to Lady Morton two months after her husband's death in September 1625, discussing the idea of her marriage to a soldier Ned Harwood (died 1632).

Elizabeth Morton died in 1626. Henry Wotton, unaware of her plans to remarry, wrote Upon the Death of Sir Albert Morton's Wife;

He first deceased; she for a little tried
To live without him, liked it not, and died.

Her brother, Colonel Edward Apsley was captured at Parnham on 7 December 1643. Her sister Alice's second husband Colonel George Fenwick (died 1656) was responsible for building the church at Berwick-upon-Tweed. The family home Thakeham Place was demolished in the 18th century.
