= Alexander Unton =

English landowner

Alexander Unton (died 1547) was an English landowner.

He was the son of Thomas Unton and Elizabeth Hyde. Thomas Unton was knighted at the coronation of Anne Boleyn.

His home was Wadley House at Faringdon, formerly in Berkshire, and now Oxfordshire. The Untons also held Minster Lovell Hall from the king.

His first wife was Mary Bourchier, a daughter of John Bourchier, 2nd Baron Berners. In 1533 he married Cecily Bulstrode, daughter of Edward Bulstrode of Hedgerley in Buckinghamshire.

Their children included:

- Edward Unton (1534–1582), who married Anne Seymour, Countess of Warwick
- Henry Unton
- Thomas Unton
- Elizabeth Unton (died 1611), who married John Croke of Chilton

Alexander Unton was made a Knight of the Bath at the coronation of Edward VI on 20 February 1547. He died on 16 December 1547.

After his death, his widow Cecily married Robert Keilway, and was the mother of Anne Keilway.
