= Albert Morton (disambiguation) =

Albert Morton may refer to:

- Albertus Morton (c. 1584-1625) English diplomat and Secretary of State
- Albert Morton (footballer) (1919-1991), English footballer see List of Rochdale A.F.C. players (25–99 appearances)
