= Andrew Keith (courtier) =

Scottish Courtier

Andrew Keith (floruit 1613) was a Scottish courtier known for fighting at Heidelberg Castle.

Keith was a servant in the household of Princess Elizabeth, daughter of King James and Anne of Denmark. The appointments of Keith as Master of Horse and James Sandilands, as Master of Household, were noted by commentators as coveted places given to Scottish men who were not of high noble status.

In 1612 he bought a "white gray" horse for Elizabeth, costing £40. Another servant or courtier in Elizabeth's household, Corbett Bushell, paid £28 for a "dapple grey stone" horse.

In 1613 Keith was an equerry and Master of the Horse to Elizabeth, now Electress Palatine at Heidelberg Castle.

In August 1613 he argued with Anne, Lady Harington, the wife of Lord Harington of Exton, in or near Elizabeth's presence and insulted Lord Harington. Elizabeth asked Hans Meinhard von Schönberg to stop the quarrel.

Subsequently, Bushell, described as a servant of Lord Harington, caught up with Keith and challenged him to fight. A Scottish servant of Keith prevented them fighting. Lord Harington then had a discussion with Bushell. Meanwhile, Keith and four or five followers prepared to ambush Bushell. Keith was armed with a sword, a square bastinado (a kind of cudgel) and a dagger. When Bushell tried to ride away, Keith hit him twice with the bastinado. Bushell and Keith fought with their swords, and Bushell was wounded several times. Another servant of Lord Harington, Mr Gray, was injured in the hand. Elizabeth's coachman helped Gray, and Keith and followers ran off. They were captured, Keith secured in his own chamber, and his followers imprisoned.

Bushell survived, and it was planned that the Haringtons would bring him back to England. Keith was sent to England a prisoner.

Corbett Bushell was a cousin of Sir Edward Bushell, an equerry to Anne of Denmark and King James, who married Anne Gargrave (d. 1634) a sister of Mary Gargrave, who was a maid of honour in the household of Anne of Denmark.
