= Robert Keilway =

English politician and court official

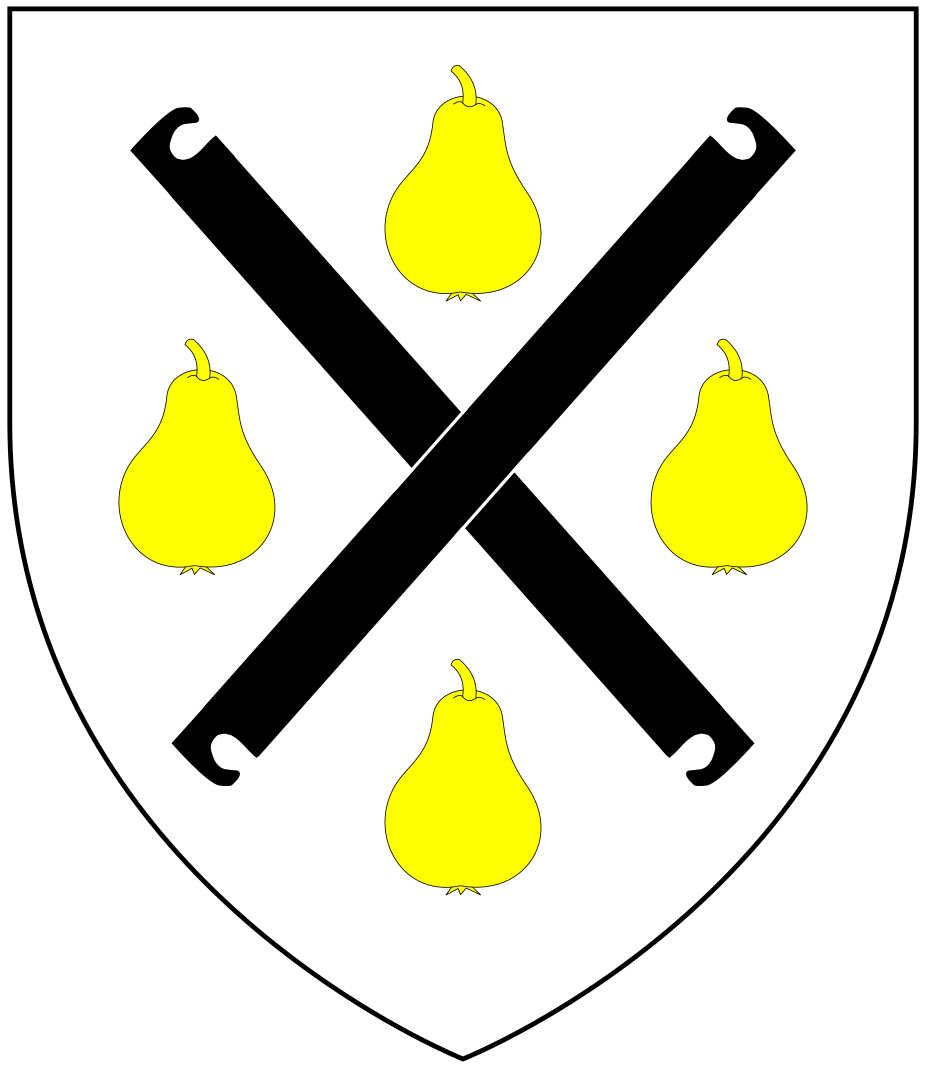
Canting arms of Keylway: Argent, two grozing irons in saltire sable between four Kelway pears proper, as seen on his monument in Exton Church

Robert Keilway (alias Kellway, Keylway, Kaylway, Kelloway, etc.) (in or before 1515–1581) of Minster Lovell Hall in Oxfordshire, was an English politician and court official.

He was the son of Robert Keilway of Salisbury and educated at Oxford University and the Inner Temple.

== Career ==
He was appointed Surveyor of the Court of Wards and Liveries in 1546 and Custos Rotulorum of Berkshire in 1549. He was elected a Member of Parliament for Bristol (1545 and 1547) and for Steyning in 1559. He was legal advisor to Edward Seymour, 1st Duke of Somerset, Lord Protector of England. and appointed serjeant-at-law in 1552.

== Marriage and children ==
He married Cecily Bulstrode, a daughter of Edward Bulstrode of Hedgerley in Buckinghamshire and widow of Sir Alexander Unton of Wadley House in the parish of Faringdon, Berkshire (now Oxfordshire). He was therefore the step-father of Sir Edward Unton. By his wife he had children, including:

- Anne Keilway (c. 1554 – 1620), wife of John Harington, 1st Baron Harington of Exton.

== Death & monument ==
His magnificent monument with effigy, erected by his daughter and son-in-law, survives in Exton Church, inscribed as follows:

"Here lies Robert Keylway a distinguished esquire among civilians (whilst he lived), renowned for talent, learning and virtue, who loved retirement, lived as a Christian and died in the Lord on the 21st of February in the year of our Salvation, 1580, and the 84th year of his age. He left Anne his sole heiress and only dearly loved daughter married to John Harrington of Exton, Knt, whom he had always affectionately loved as a son and friend, by which Anne the said John had during the life of the aforesaid Robert two children, a son, Kelwey, who died Dec. 2nd, 1570, 21 weeks old, and lies buried here with his grandfather, and also a daughter Lucy still surviving, and may God grant her a long life. To pay, therefore, a just tribute to so dear and affectionate a parent and to leave to posterity an evidence of their deep gratitude, the said John and Anne have raised this monument and dedicated to their father, Keylwey, and their son Keylwey (to their lasting memory if it so please God) and design it, if God will, as a sepulchre for themselves also".

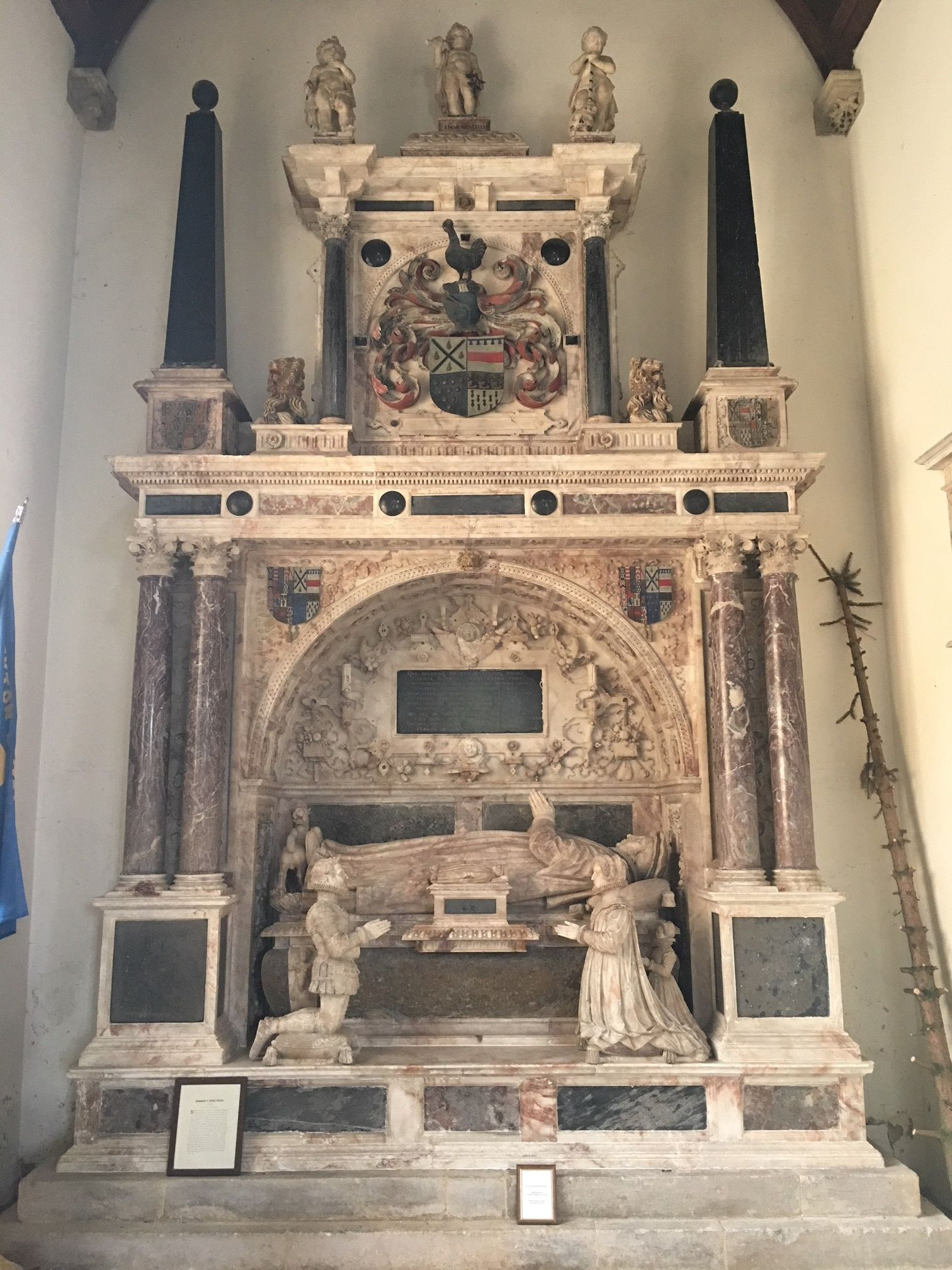
Memorial to Robert Keilway in the church of St Peter & St Paul, Exton, Rutland
