= Albertus Morton =

English diplomat and Secretary of State

Sir Albertus Morton (c. 1584 – November, 1625) was an English diplomat and Secretary of State. His widow's death, apparently from grief, is commemorated in a celebrated epigraph by his relative Sir Henry Wotton.

== Life ==
Born about 1584, he was the youngest of the three sons of George Morton of Eshere in Chilham, Kent, by Mary, daughter of Robert Honywood of Charing in the same county. His grandmother, when left a widow, remarried Sir Thomas Wotton, and became the mother of Sir Henry Wotton, who always called himself Albertus Morton's uncle. He was educated at Eton College, and was elected to King's College, Cambridge, in 1603, apparently by royal influence, but he did not graduate there.

In July 1604 Wotton was appointed ambassador to Venice, and his nephew accompanied him as secretary. In 1609 Morton returned to England, and in August 1613 he was talked of as minister to Savoy, but he met with a serious carriage accident in the same year, and he did not start until 12 May 1614. Before 22 December of the same year, he was appointed clerk to the council, and had set off on his return from Savoy to take up the duties of his office before 6 April 1615. In April 1616 he went to Heidelberg as secretary to the Princess Elizabeth, wife of Frederick V, Elector Palatine. He was knighted on 23 September 1617, and saw little enough of the electress: his brother, writing in October 1618, says that he had returned at that time and was ill, and under the care of an Italian doctor. He may have given up his clerkship while with the electress but on 6 April 1619, he had a formal grant of the office for life. He collected subscriptions for the elector in 1620, and in December of the same year he took over £30,000 to the Protestant princes of Germany. He returned before 12 March of the following year.

He resigned his place in 1623 in a fit of pique, on not being allowed to be present when the Spanish match was discussed. It was rumoured in April 1624 that he was to succeed Sir Edward Herbert as ambassador to France, and later that he had refused the appointment, which, Dudley Carleton wrote, was as strange as that it was offered to him. By this time under the patronage of George Villiers, 1st Duke of Buckingham, and before 26 July he was formally appointed to Paris. He was injured in November of the same year by a fall from his horse.

Early in 1625 Sir George Calvert gave up the secretaryship of state for a substantial consideration, and Morton was sworn in at Newmarket in his place. He was elected Member of Parliament for the county of Kent and for the University of Cambridge (he had been seriously proposed for the provostship of King's College) in the parliament of 1625. Buckingham had written to the mayor of Rochester in his favour, and he chose to sit for Kent, but he died in November 1625, and was buried at Southampton, where he had property. Wotton wrote an elegy upon him.

Morton married Elizabeth Apsley, daughter of Sir Edward Apsley, but left no issue. His widow died very soon after him, and Wotton wrote a celebrated epigram upon her death: "He first deceased, she for a little tried, to live without him, liked it not, and died". Morton was succeeded as secretary by Sir John Coke.

Political offices
Preceded by George Calvert; Sir Edward Conway, 1st Viscount Conway	Secretary of State; 1625; With: Sir Edward Conway, 1st Viscount Conway	Succeeded by Sir Edward Conway, 1st Viscount Conway; Sir John Coke
