= Robert Keilway (MP for Salisbury) =

English politician, 15th century

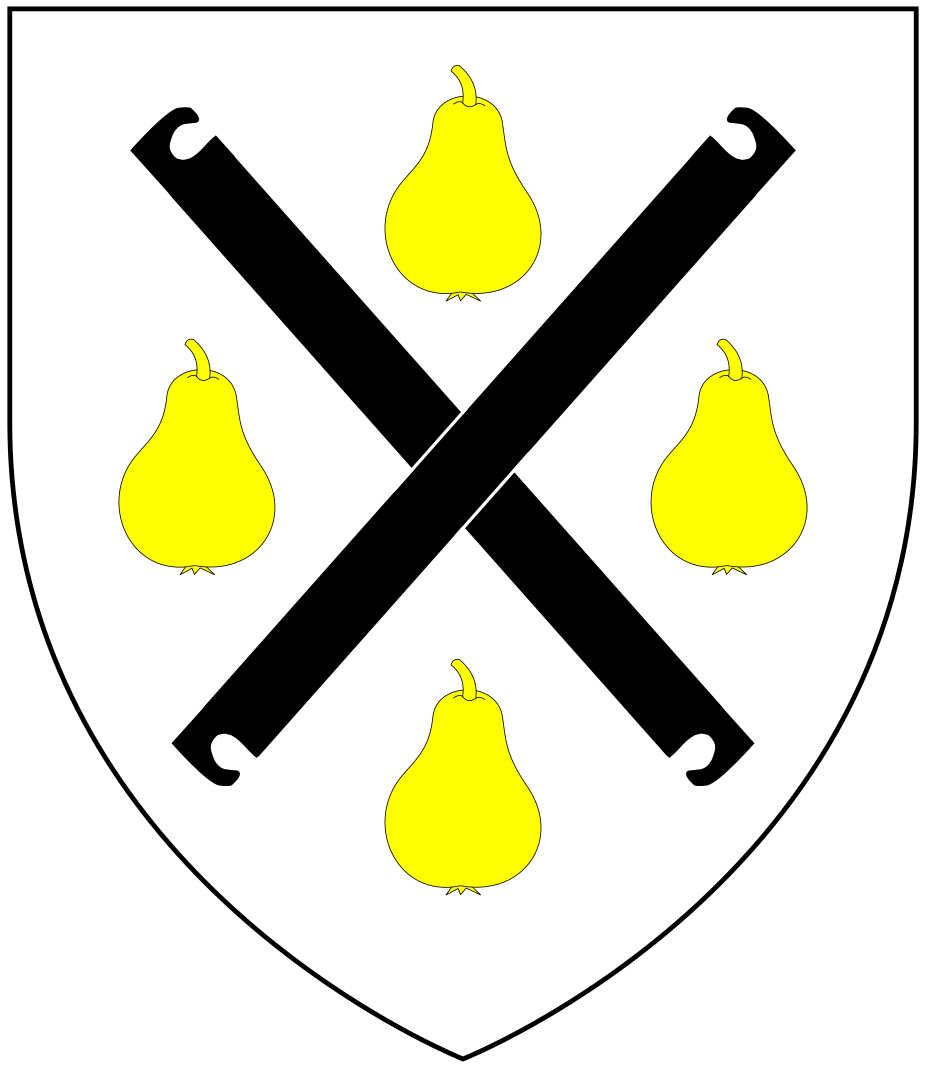
Canting arms of Keylway: Argent, two grozing irons in saltire sable between four Kelway pears proper

Robert Keilway (by 1483 – 1537 or later) was an English politician.

He was a member (MP) of the parliament of England for Salisbury in 1523. His son was Robert Keilway, also an MP.
