= Minster Lovell =

Village in Oxfordshire, England

Coordinates: 51.799°N 1.545°W

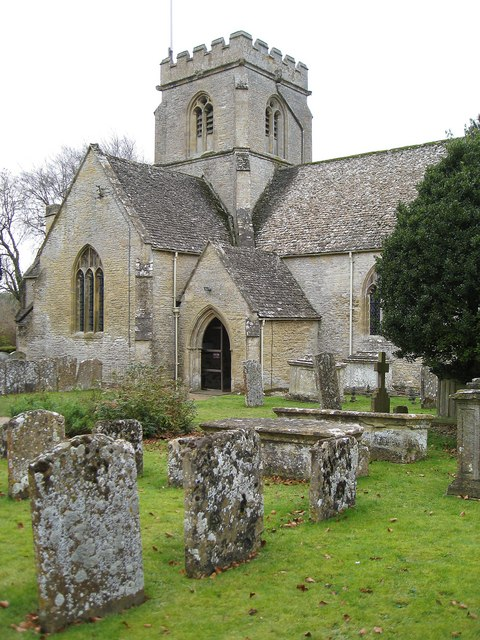
- St Kenelm's parish church

- Location within Oxfordshire
- Population: 1,409 (2011 Census)
- OS grid reference: SP3110
- Civil parish: Minster Lovell
- District: West Oxfordshire
- Shire county: Oxfordshire
- Region: South East
- Country: England
- Sovereign state: United Kingdom
- Post town: Witney
- Postcode district: OX29
- Dialling code: 01993
- Police: Thames Valley
- Fire: Oxfordshire
- Ambulance: South Central
- UK Parliament: Witney
- Website: Minster Lovell Parish Council

Minster Lovell is a village and civil parish on the River Windrush about 2 1/2 miles (4 km) west of Witney in Oxfordshire. The 2011 Census recorded the parish's population as 1,409. Minster Lovell village has three parts: Old Minster, Little Minster and New Minster. Old Minster includes the parish church, Minster Lovell Hall and the Old Swan Inn and Minster Mill Hotel. A large part of New Minster is the Charterville Allotments, which were founded by the Chartists in 1846–50.

== Archaeology ==
In 1952 a Neolithic stone hand axe was found at Minster Lovell. It is unusually large: 13 inches (324 mm) long by 4 inches (101 mm) wide. The geologist Professor K.C. Dunham identified it as epidotised tuff from Stake Pass in the Lake District, 230 miles (370 km) to the north. Stone axes from the same source have been found at Alvescot, Kencot, Abingdon and Sutton Courtenay.

== History ==
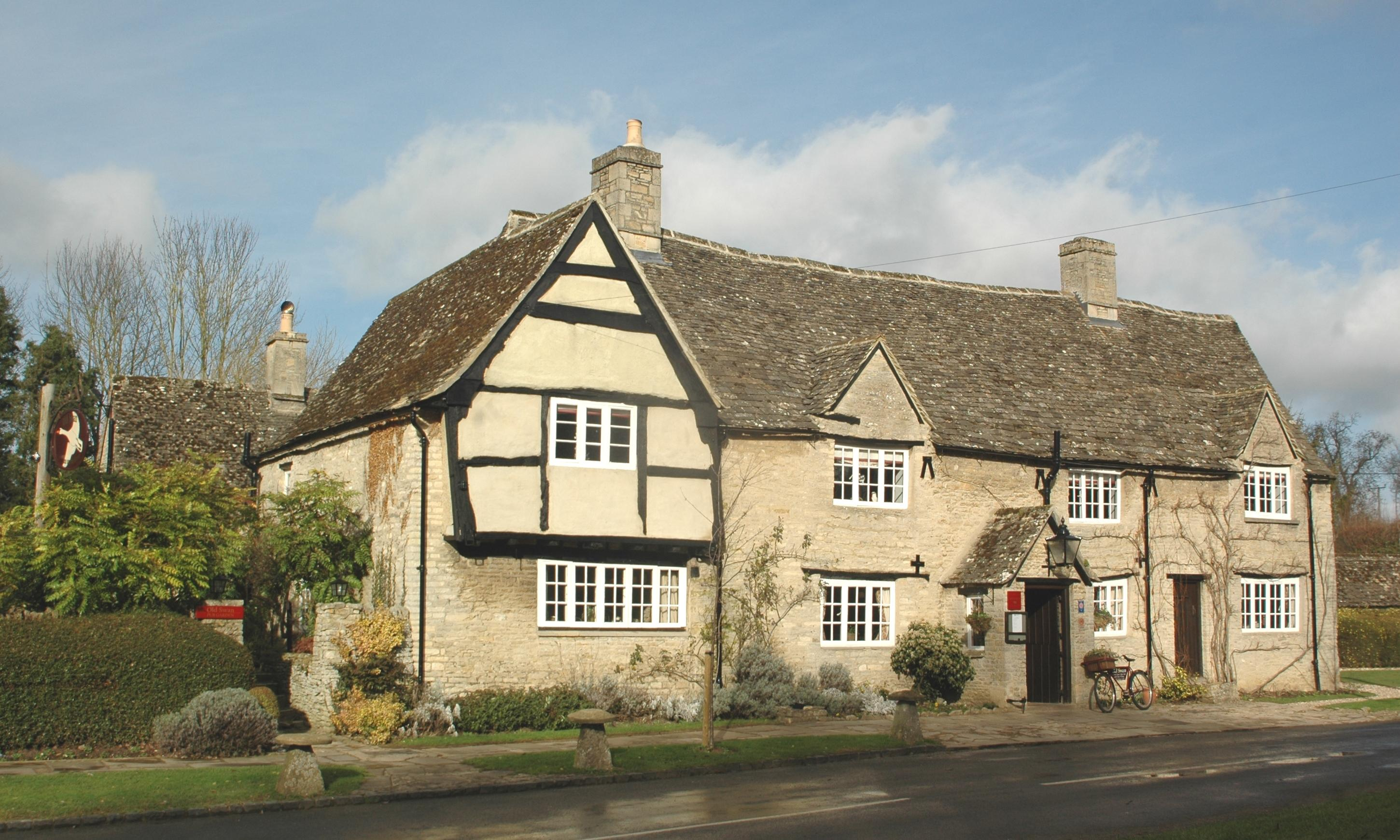
The Old Swan Inn

The village was named Minstre, situated in the ancient hundred of Bampton in 1086. The dedication of the Church of England parish church to the Saxon Saint Kenelm and the name "Minster" in the toponym suggest that the village may have had a Saxon minster, possibly associated with a Mercian royal vill. However, the earliest known documentary record of the church is from 1183 and the present St. Kenelm's Church is the product of complete rebuilding in the 15th century. The suffix "Lovell", from the main landholding family, was added to the name from the 13th century. In 1197 a William Lovel (died 1213) held land here, probably granted in 1124 to his father William by Henry I.

The Norman Ivry Abbey had a priory at Minster Lovell by 1226. Because it was an alien priory, the Crown repeatedly seized its property between 1330 and 1441, until in the latter year Henry VI granted reversion of the priory's possessions to Eton College. Minster Lovell Hall and Dovecote are extensive ruins of a 15th-century manor house, once belonging to William Lovel's descendant, Lord Lovell. There is a medieval dovecote nearby. There is a legend that in 1708 the skeletal remains of Lord Lovell were discovered in a secret chamber in the manor house. Lord Lovell had fought in the Battle of Stoke in 1487, and had been seen escaping from the battle, but was never afterwards heard of. It is supposed that he had hidden himself there and died of starvation.

Lord Lovell forfeited his lands to the Crown in 1485, and the property passed through several owners until it was bought in 1603 by Sir Edward Coke. The manor remained in the Coke family for several generations, and Thomas Coke, created Baron Lovel in 1728, abandoned Minster Lovell Hall in 1747 and partially dismantled it.

The area known as Charterville is the third of the Chartist estates. 300 acres (120 ha) were divided into 78 smallholdings with model cottages. 40 oxen and 18 pigs were provided to the winners of the plots, drawn by lot from the shareholders of the National Land Company, along with manure, firewood and seed. The area is still called Charterville Allotments, and the original plots still survive as freehold bungalows set in large gardens.

== Amenities ==
Minster Lovell has three public houses: the Old Swan, the White Hart and The Horse & Radish. The River Windrush supports species including trout, chub and crayfish. Only Minster Lovell residents may fish the river at Wash Meadow, and only with a permit issued by the Water Bailiff, whose contact details are available from the Parish Council. Wash Meadow is an amenity for Minster Lovell residents and sport clubs users only. A public footpath crosses the field to the parish church.

Minster Lovell Cricket Club was founded in 1896. Its teams play in the Cherwell Cricket League after the club's first team won a treble of OCA League Division 1, Airey Cup and Tony Pullinger T20 Cup in 2016. Minster Lovell won Cherwell League Division 4 at the first attempt in 2017. The first team subsequently gained promotion to Division 2 the following season, but were relegated back to Division 3 in 2019. The club has a second ground 3 miles (5 km) away at Brize Norton.
