= Hans Meinhard von Schönberg =

Count Hans Meinhard von Schönberg auf Wesel (German: Graf Hans Meinhard von Schönberg auf Wesel) (28 August 1582 – 3 August 1616) was a German nobleman and soldier, who served as hofmeister of Frederick V, Elector Palatine.

== Biography ==
Hans Meinhard von Schönberg was born in Bacharach on 28 August 1582. His father, Count Meinhard von Schönberg auf Wesel (26 April 1530 – 22 April 1596), was a Feldmarschall of Johann Casimir of the Palatinate-Simmern and Amtmann of Bacharach. His mother was Dorothea Riedesel von Bellersheim (died 1610).

Our first sign of Hans Meinhard von Schönberg in public life comes in 1609, when Frederick IV, Elector Palatine sent him as Ambassador to Rudolf II, Holy Roman Emperor, at a time when the Protestant German nobles were growing more and more alienated from the court of the Holy Roman Emperor.

Schönberg seems to have done a good job, because soon after his embassy to present the German nobles' concerns to Rudolf, Frederick despatched Schönberg to the Dutch Republic to persuade the States-General of the Netherlands to intervene in the Jülich succession dispute (after the death of John William, Duke of Jülich-Cleves-Berg on 25 March 1609, the United Duchies of Jülich-Cleves-Berg were claimed by both Wolfgang William, Count Palatine of Neuburg and John Sigismund, Elector of Brandenburg). He thereafter participated in discussion with the French ambassador Jacques Bongars at Düsseldorf.

In 1610, Schönberg was appointed commander of a regiment of Dutch troops. He was also named Governor of Düsseldorf. With the outbreak of hostilities in the War of the Jülich succession, he participated in the siege of Jülich to retake the fort at Jülich from the forces of Rudolf II, Holy Roman Emperor. When the fort finally fell, Schönberg made out well in the plundering that followed.

On 22 February 1611 Schönberg entered the service of John Sigismund, Elector of Brandenburg, who entrusted him with supreme command of his artillery corps in the Rhineland, with its headquarters at Wesel. He again served as a diplomat to The Hague on behalf of the Protestant Union.

Later in 1611, he returned to the Electorate of the Palatinate to construct fortresses at Mannheim. On 1 November 1611 he was appointed hofmeister of Frederick V, Elector Palatine. He continued his diplomatic work for the Protestant Union, traveling to the Hague and Brussels. In 1612, he traveled to England to arrange the marriage of Elizabeth Stuart, daughter of James I of England to Frederick.

During this trip, Schönberg met Anna Sutton-Dudley, daughter of Edward Sutton, 5th Baron Dudley and Theodosia Harington. The two were later married in London on 22 March 1615. Anna would give birth to a child, Frederick, subsequently the 1st Duke of Schomberg, in Heidelberg in December 1615. Anne died shortly after his birth. During the dispute between Frederick Ulrich, Duke of Brunswick-Lüneburg and the city of Braunschweig, Schönberg entered Frederick Ulrich's service.

Schönberg died in Heidelberg on 3 August 1616.
