= Anne Keilway =

English aristocrat

- Lady Harington
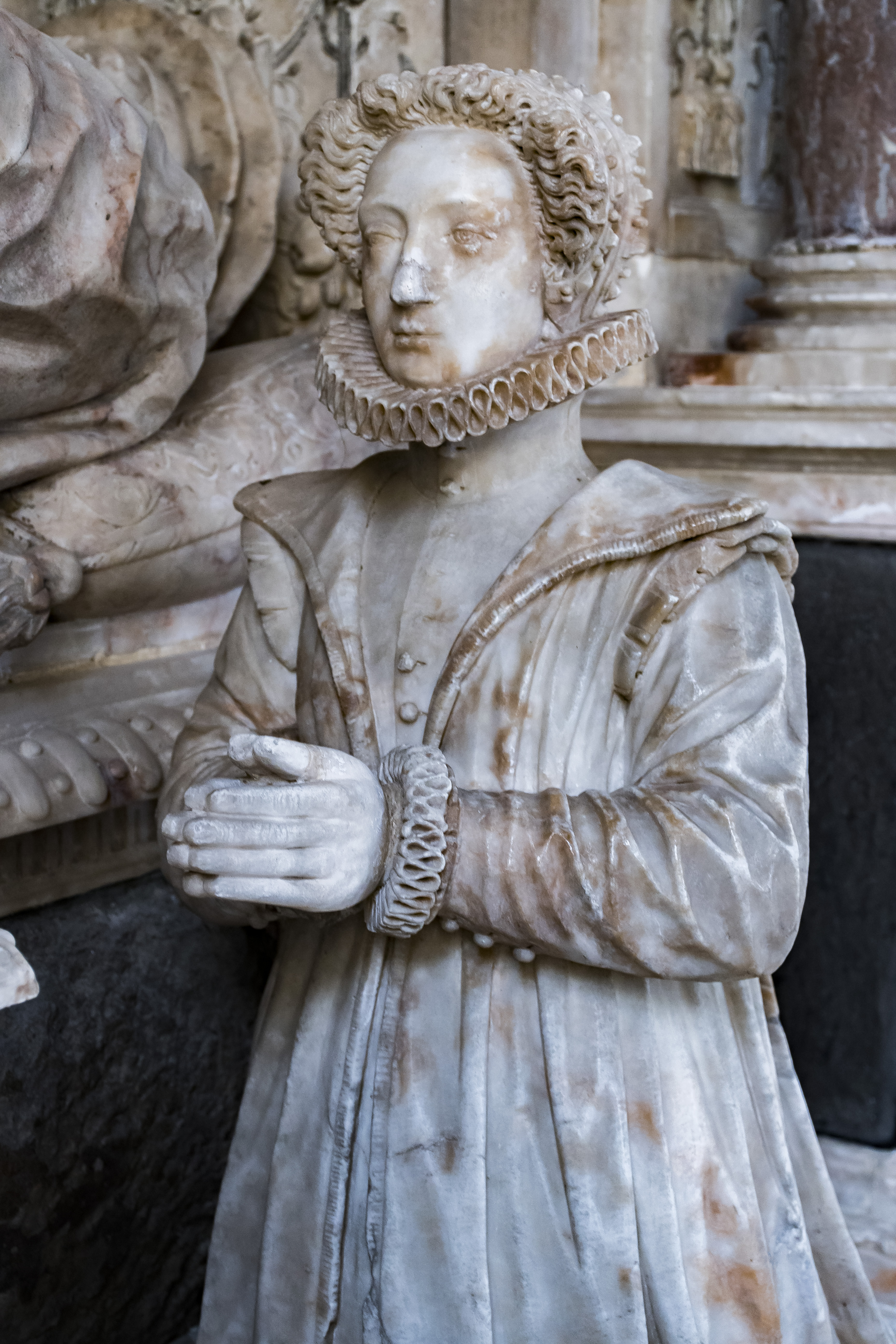
- Anne Keilway, represented on her father's monument at the Church of St Peter & St Paul, Exton, Rutland
- Died: May 1620
- Noble family: Keilway
- Spouse: John Harington, 1st Baron Harington of Exton
- Issue: John Harington, 2nd Baron Harington of Exton; Lucy Russell, Countess of Bedford; Frances Harington
- Father: Robert Keilway
- Mother: Cecily Bulstrode

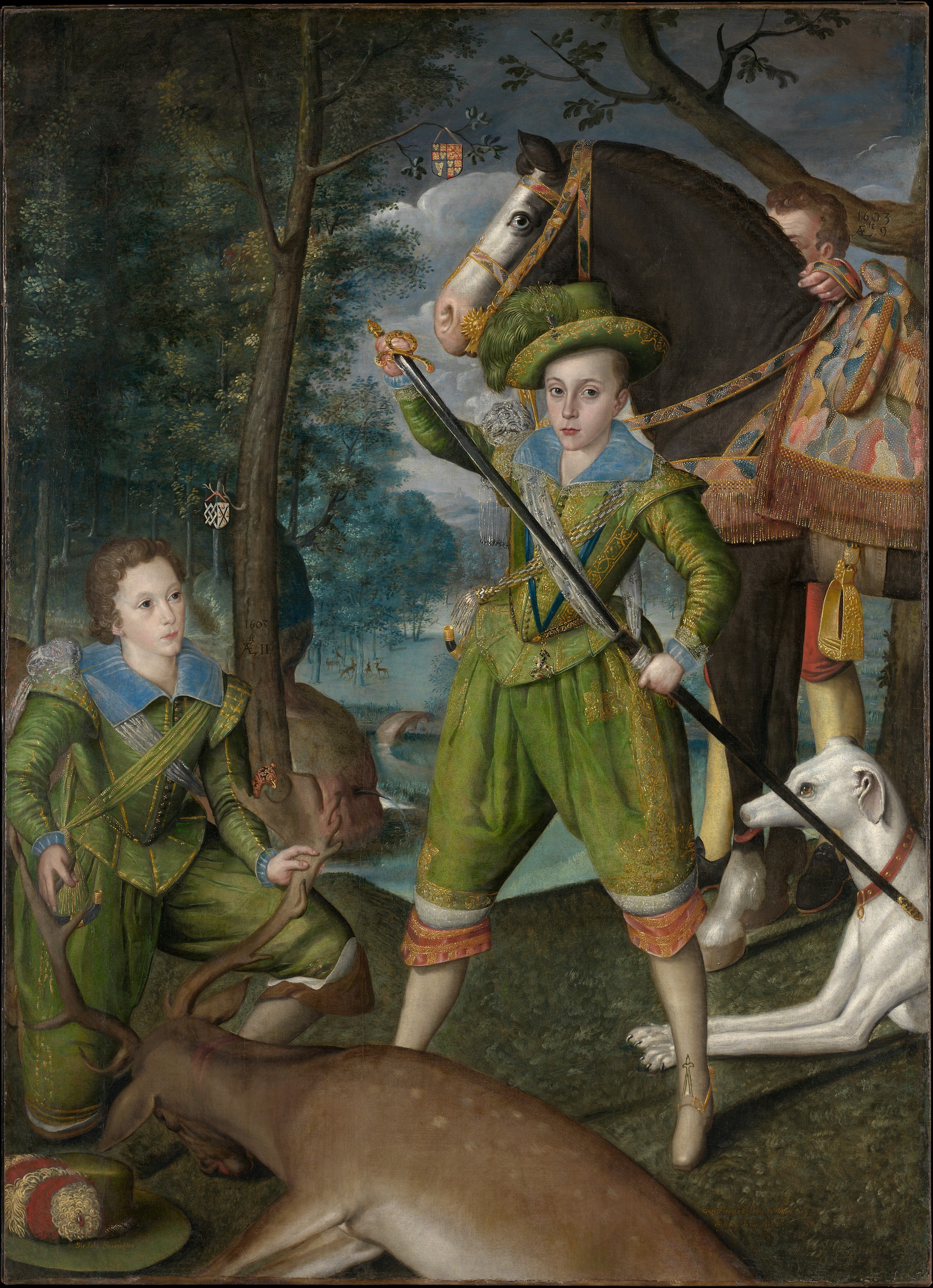
Prince Henry with John Harington, Robert Peake the Elder, Met

Anne Keilway, Lady Harington (died 1620) was an English courtier.

== Career ==
She was a daughter of Robert Keilway or "Kelway" of Minster Lovell and Cecily Bulstrode, a daughter of Edward Bulstrode of Hedgerley in Buckinghamshire and widow of Alexander Unton of Wadley. Her father was surveyor of livery at the court of wards in 1547.

Anne Keilway married John Harington, 1st Baron Harington of Exton, in 1573, and was known as "Lady Harington". She was an heiress, and brought him Minster Lovell and Coombe Abbey in Warwickshire, and the expectation of further property owned by her father, who died in 1581.

After the Union of the Crowns in 1603, Lady Harington travelled to Scotland with her daughter, Lucy, Countess of Bedford, to meet and gain the favour of Anne of Denmark, the wife of the new king, James VI and I. A number of aristocratic women made the journey, some were appointed by the Privy Council to wait for Anne of Denmark on the border at Berwick-upon-Tweed. The Venetian diplomat, Giovanni Carlo Scaramelli, wrote that six great ladies went north accompanied by 200 horsemen.

A group of women, mostly of the Harington family, went to Edinburgh before the queen travelled to Berwick, including Lady Harington and her daughter Lucy Countess of Bedford, her niece Theodosia Noel, Lady Cecil, Lady Hastings, with Elizabeth Cecil, Lady Hatton. A "Lady Hastings" was either Sarah Harington, or her sister-in-law, Dorothy Hastings.

The journey to Scotland was successful, and Lady Harington was appointed to the bedchamber. At first, Frances Howard, Countess of Kildare, who had also independently made the trip to Scotland and previously shown an interest in Scottish politics, was made governess of Princess Elizabeth. Anne Clifford first saw Princess Elizabeth at Dingley near Althorp and recalled that Kildare and Harington were her governesses. After Kildare's husband Lord Cobham was implicated in the Main Plot, the Haringtons were appointed custodians of Princess Elizabeth at Coombe Abbey near Coventry.

Princess Elizabeth married Frederick V, Elector Palatine on 14 February 1613 and the Haringtons accompanied her to the Electoral Palatinate. At Heidelberg, Lord Harington's servants fought with Andrew Keith, a Scottish courtier who had insulted his wife.

Claudius Hollyband dedicated his primer, A Treasurie of the French Tong (Henrie Bynneman, London, 1580) to her as "Mademoiselle Anne Harington". In 1616, Lady Harington founded a library at the parish church of Oakham with around 125 religious works in Latin and Greek for the benefit of local clergymen, bound in leather tooled with the Harington knot in gilt, with her Latin ex libris. The majority of the remaining books are now held by the University of Nottingham.

Anne, Lady Harington, died in May 1620.

== Family ==
Her children included:

- John Harington, 2nd Baron Harington of Exton (1592–1614), friend of Prince Henry
- Lucy Harington, who married Edward Russell, 3rd Earl of Bedford.
- Frances Harington (1587-1615), who married Sir Robert Chichester (1578–1627). She danced at court in The Masque of Beauty on 10 January 1608. She is buried at Pilton, Devon.

A portrait in the Swedish Royal Collection, at Gripsholm Castle, formerly with later inscriptions identifying the sitter as Queen Elizabeth, has sometimes been identified as Anne, Lady Harington. A cushion shows the Keilway-Harington heraldry. She wears a coronet and a diamond feather jewel which appear in portraits of her daughter, Lucy Countess of Bedford, who is more the likely the sitter.
