= Minster Lovell Hall =

Ruin in Minster Lovell, England

Coordinates: 51°47′59″N 1°31′51″W

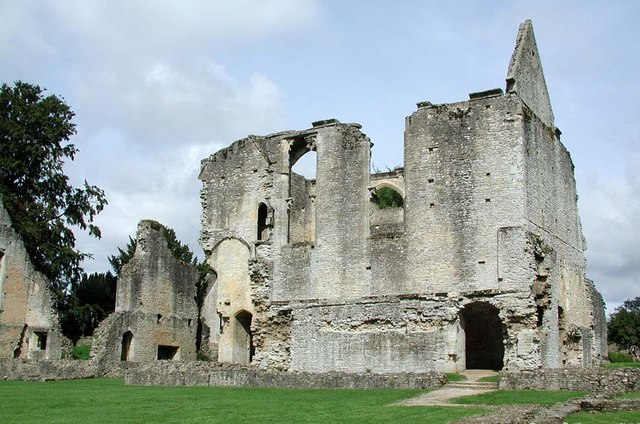
Minster Lovell Hall

Location map of Minster Lovell Hall

Minster Lovell Hall is a ruin in Minster Lovell, an English village in the Oxfordshire Cotswolds. The ruins are situated by the River Windrush.

== History ==
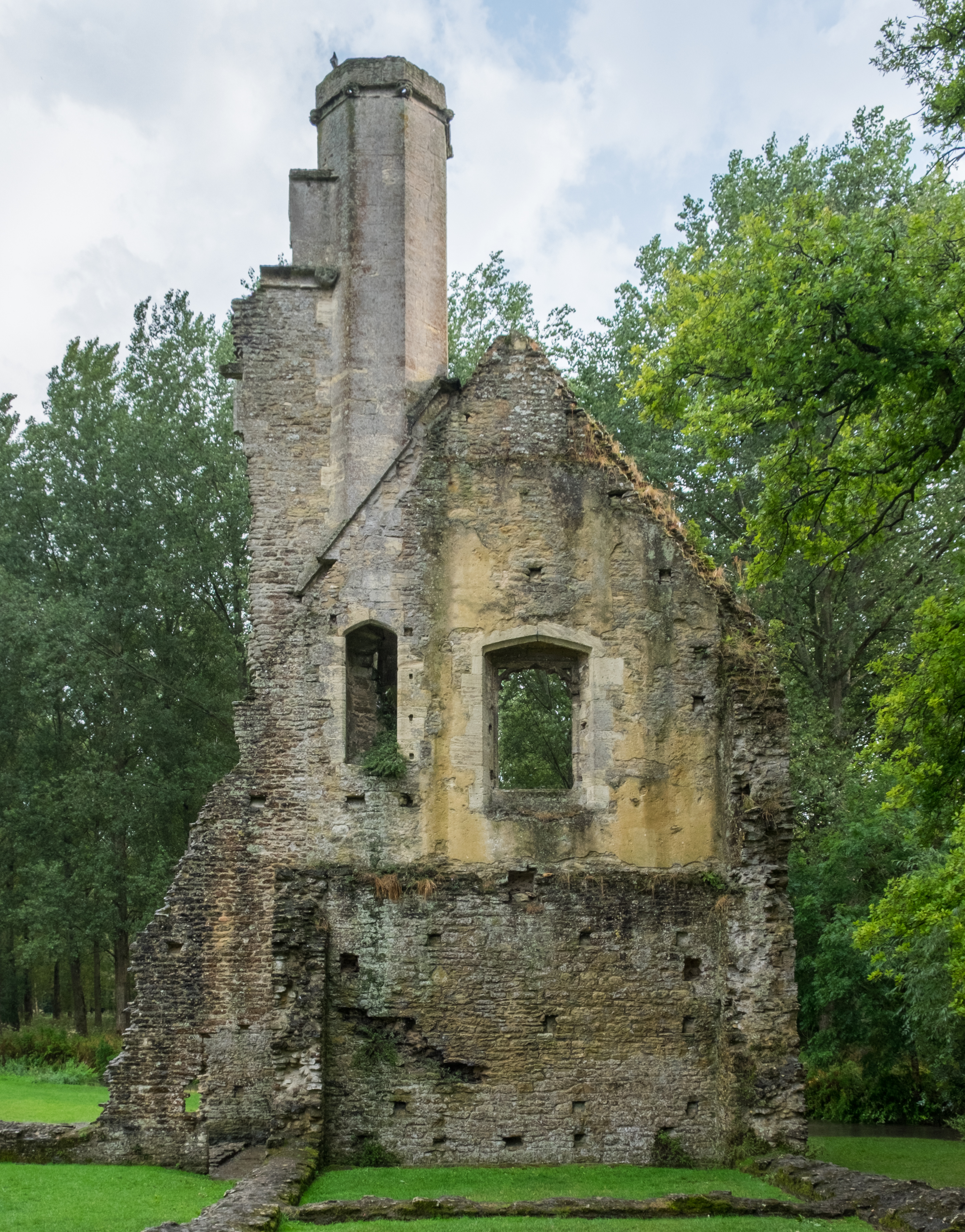
The south-west tower

Minster Lovell Hall was built by William Lovell around 1440. As Minster Lovell was one of the earliest estates held by the Lovell family and one of their main residences it was at least the second building occupying this site.

The Hall was a fairly typical if impressive manor house. The buildings surround three sides of a square; the fourth side towards the River Windrush was closed off by a wall. The great tower at the south-west corner seems to be a later addition to the house, as part of the adjoining west wing had to be rebuilt.

Minster Lovell Hall remained the main residence of the Lovell family. Richard III visited it as a guest of Francis Lovell, 1st Viscount Lovell, grandson of William Lovell. Francis Lovell's estates were declared forfeit after the Battle of Bosworth and Minster Lovell was granted to Jasper Tudor, uncle of Henry VII.

The property changed hands several times over the next two centuries. Among the owners were Henry VIII's gentlemen of the stool, William Compton and Henry Norris.

The property was bought in 1603 by Sir Edward Coke. The manor remained in the Coke family for several generations, and Thomas Coke, created Baron Lovel in 1728, abandoned Minster Lovell Hall in 1747. Large parts of the buildings were dismantled. By the early nineteenth century the ruins of Minster Lovell Hall were thought to have been the buildings of an alien priory.

== Legend ==
According to one report a skeleton was discovered in the basement of Minster Lovell Hall in 1718 and was thought to be that of Francis Lovell who had hidden there after the Battle of Stoke and had died of starvation. It seems unlikely this is the case. Francis Lovell spent little time in Minster Lovell and therefore would have no faithful servant there who could hide and feed him for years.

== Today ==
The quite extensive ruins of Minster Lovell Hall are now in the care of English Heritage as a Grade I listed building and scheduled monument. The most prominent features are the Hall with its ornamented entrance porch and the south west tower. A dovecote, probably also built in the fifteenth century, is also part of the site. Much of the site has fallen over the years but large amounts remain to this day.
