= George Glover (engraver) =

English engraver

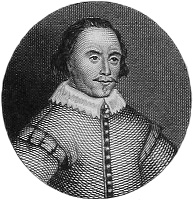
George Glover

George Glover (active 1625–1650) was an English engraver, working in the reign (1625–1649) of Charles I. He mainly worked for London publishers, including Robert Peake, Thomas Banks, John Hinde and Peter Stent.

He also self-published a plate of Queen Henrietta Maria, after a painting by Van Dyck.

== Works ==
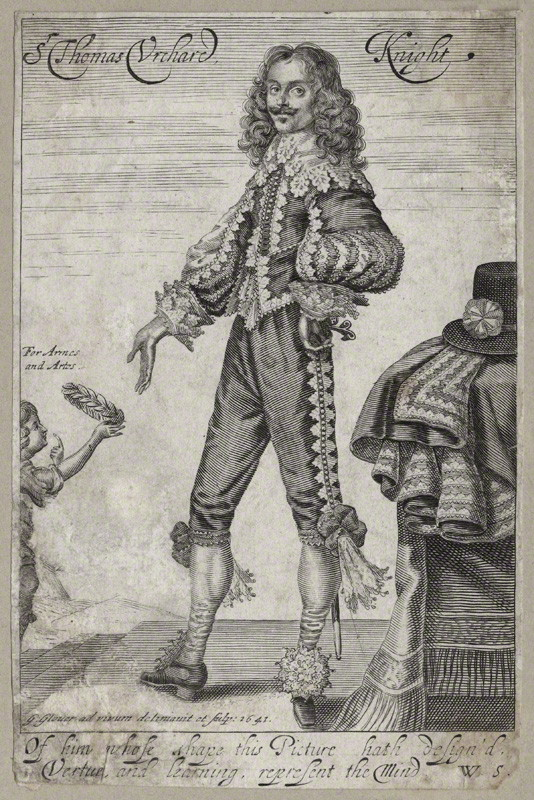
Frontispiece of Sir Thomas Urquhart, 1641.

Glover worked somewhat in the manner of John Payne. His engravings included portraits of:

- Charles I;
- Henrietta Maria;
- Charles II;
- Catherine of Braganza;
- James, Duke of York;
- Mary, Princess of Orange;
- Robert Devereux, 3rd Earl of Essex, on horseback;
- Algernon Percy, 10th Earl of Northumberland;
- Sir Edward Dering;
- Sir William Brereton, on horseback;
- Yaurar Ben Abdalla, ambassador from Morocco;
- James Ussher;
- John Lilburne, an oval portrait, engraved first in 1641, and altered in 1646 by placing prison bars across it;
- John Pym;
- Sir George Strode;
- Sir Thomas Urquhart;
- Dr. John Preston;
- Lord Finch;
- Sir William Waller, and others.

Several of these and other portraits were engraved for the booksellers as frontispieces to books; Glover also engraved numerous title-pages. A broadside engraved by him gives the portraits and biographies of William Evans, the giant porter, Jeffery Hudson, the dwarf, and Thomas Parr, the very old man. Some of Glover's portraits, such as those of Sir Thomas Urquhart and Innocent Nath. Witt, an idiot, were engraved from the life. His earliest works bear the address of William Peake, for whom most of the early English engravers worked. Glover's own portrait was engraved by R. Grave, jun., from a drawing once in William Oldys's possession.
