= Peter Stent =

London printseller (c. 1613–1665)

Peter Stent (c. 1613–1665) was a seventeenth-century London printseller, who from the early 1640s until his death ran one of the biggest printmaking businesses of the day.

Stent originally was an engraver himself. Edward Calver wrote verses to a set of Stent's plates from 1635. He then sold works of other artists, such as John Dunstall, John Fillian, Richard Gaywood, and George Glover. He also recycled plates he had acquired, in new printings: for example of the penmanship of Martin Billingsley, by George Gifford, from Sir Robert Peake and Thomas Rowlett via Thomas Hinde.

Stent died in the Great Plague of London. His business was taken over by John Overton.
