= Robert Peake the Elder =

English painter (c. 1551–1619)

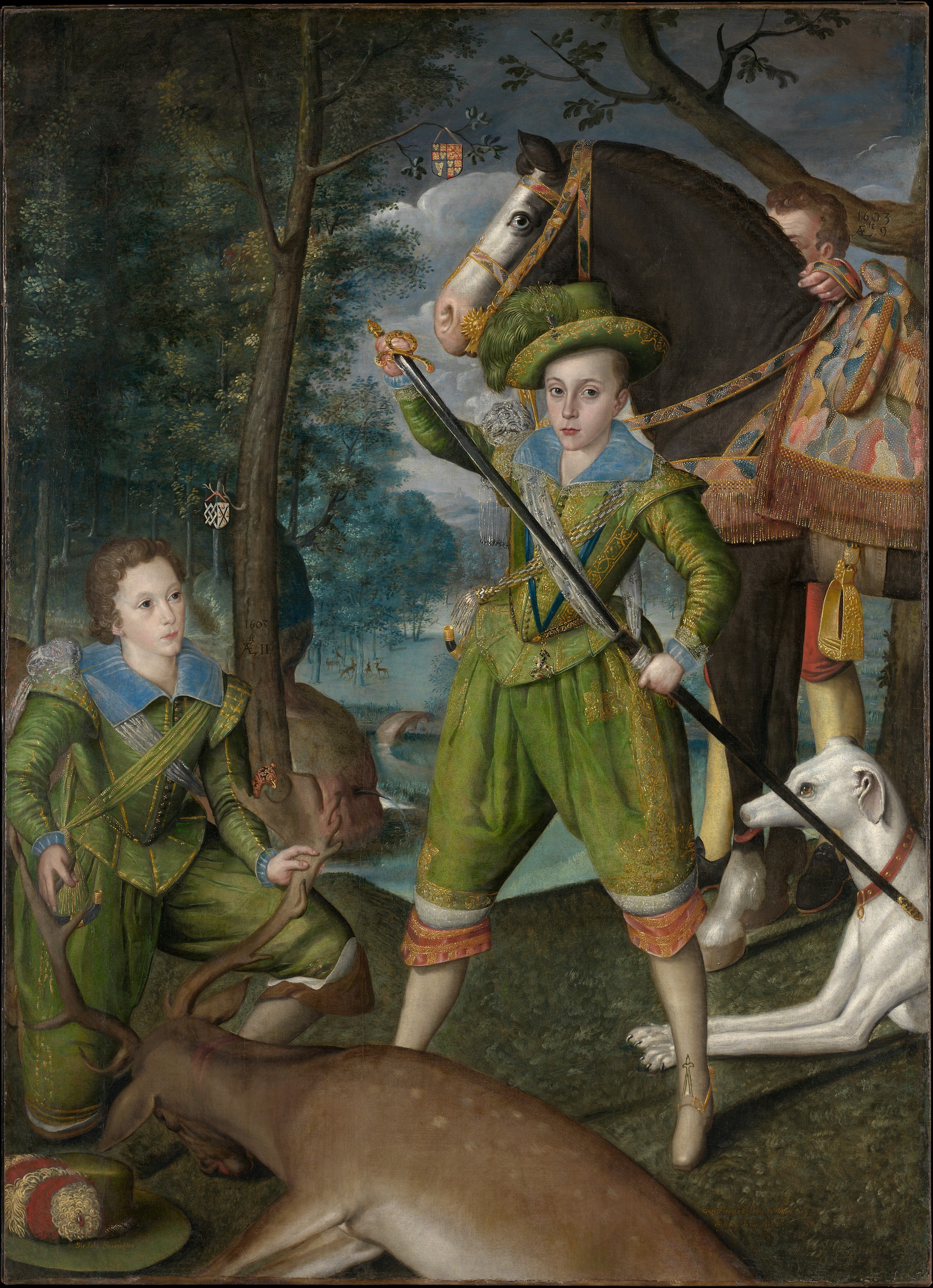
Portrait of Henry, Prince of Wales (centre right), who died aged eighteen, and at left John Harington, later 2nd Lord Harington of Exton, by Robert Peake the Elder, 1603 (Metropolitan Museum of Art, New York). A variant version in which the prince is accompanied by Robert Devereux, 3rd Earl of Essex, is in the Royal Collection, U.K., dated c. 1605

Robert Peake the Elder (c. 1551–1619) was an English painter active in the later part of Elizabeth I's reign and for most of the reign of James I. In 1604, he was appointed picture maker to the heir to the throne, Prince Henry; and in 1607, serjeant-painter to King James I – a post he shared with John De Critz.

Peake was the only English-born painter of a group of four artists whose workshops were closely connected. The others were De Critz, Marcus Gheeraerts the Younger, and the miniature painter Isaac Oliver. Between 1590 and about 1625, they specialised in brilliantly coloured, full-length "costume pieces" that are unique to England at this time. It is not always possible to attribute authorship between Peake, De Critz, Gheeraerts and their assistants with certainty.

== A family of painters ==
Peake married Elizabeth Beckwith, probably in 1579. He is often called "the elder", to distinguish him from his son, the painter and print seller William Peake (c. 1580–1639) and from his grandson, Sir Robert Peake (c. 1605–67), who followed his father into the family print-selling business. In the accounts for Prince Henry's funeral, Robert Peake is called "Mr Peake the elder painter", and William Peake, "Mr Peake the younger painter". Peake's grandson Sir Robert Peake (sometimes wrongly called his son) was knighted by King Charles I during the English Civil War. The Parliamentarians captured him after their siege of Basing House, which was under his command.

== Career ==
=== Early life and work ===
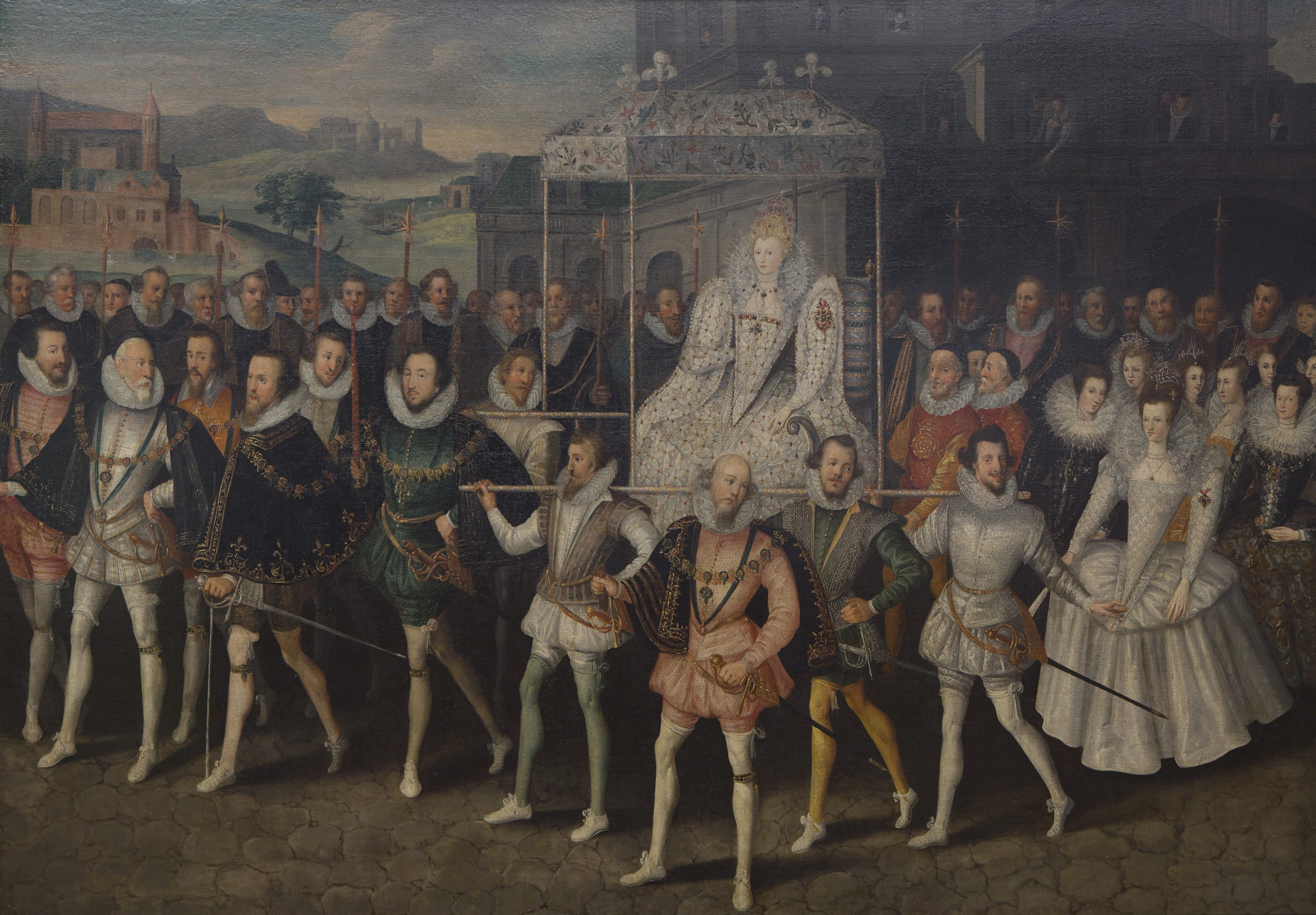
The Procession Picture, c. 1600, a well-known work showing Elizabeth I borne along by her courtiers (see below under Paintings). Sherborne Castle, Dorset.

Peake was born to a Lincolnshire family in about 1551. He began his training on 30 April 1565 under Laurence Woodham, who lived at the sign of "The Key" in Goldsmith's Row, Westcheap. He was apprenticed, three years after the miniaturist Nicholas Hilliard, to the Goldsmiths' Company in London. He became a freeman of the company on 20 May 1576. His son William later followed in his father's footsteps as a freeman of the Goldsmiths' Company and a portrait painter. Peake's training would have been similar to that of John de Critz and Marcus Gheeraerts the Younger, who may have been pupils of the Flemish artist Lucas de Heere.

Peake is first recorded as a painter in 1576 in the pay of the Office of the Revels, the department that oversaw court festivities for Elizabeth I. When Peake began practising as a portrait painter is uncertain. According to art historian Roy Strong, he was "well established" in London by the late 1580s, with a "fashionable clientele". Payments made to him for portraits are recorded in the Rutland accounts at Belvoir in the 1590s. A signed portrait from 1593, known as the "Military Commander", shows Peake's early style. Other portraits have been grouped with it on the basis of similar lettering. Its three-quarter-length portrait format is typical of the time.

=== Painter to Prince Henry ===
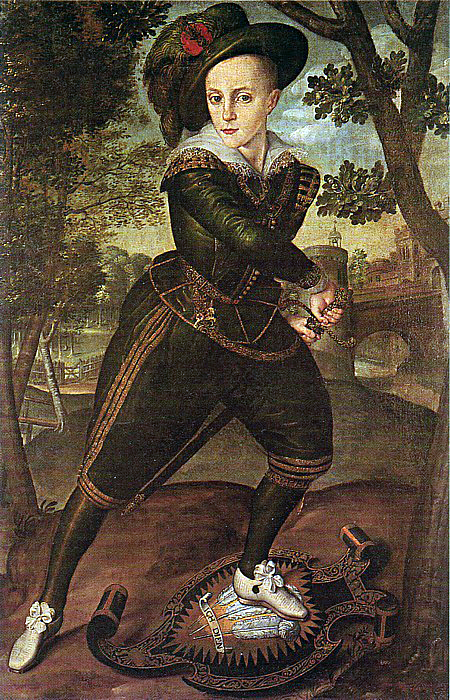
Prince Henry, c. 1610. His foot rests on a shield bearing the device of the Prince of Wales, a title conferred on him the same year.

In 1607, after the death of Leonard Fryer, Peake was appointed serjeant-painter to King James I, sharing the office with John De Critz, who had held the post since 1603. The role entailed the painting of original portraits and their reproduction as new versions, to be given as gifts or sent to foreign courts, as well as the copying and restoring of portraits by other painters in the royal collection.

In addition to copying and restoring portraits, the serjeant-painters also undertook decorative tasks, such as the painting of banners and stage scenery. Parchment rolls of the Office of the Works record that De Critz oversaw the decorating of royal houses and palaces. Since Peake's work is not recorded there, it seems as if De Critz took responsibility for the more decorative tasks, while Peake continued his work as a royal portrait painter. However, Peake and Paul Isackson painted the cabins, carvings, and armorials on the ship the Prince Royal in 1611.

In 1610, Peake was described as "painter to Prince Henry", the sixteen-year-old prince who was gathering around him a significant cultural salon. Peake commissioned a translation of Books I-V of Sebastiano Serlio's Architettura, which he dedicated to the prince in 1611. Scholars have deduced from payments made to Peake that his position as painter to Prince Henry led to his appointment as serjeant-painter to the king. The payments were listed by the Prince's household officer Sir David Murray as disbursements from the Privy Purse to "Mr Peck". On 14 October 1608, Peake was paid £7 for "pictures made by His Highness’ command"; and on 14 July 1609, he was paid £3 "for a picture of His Highness which was given in exchange for the King’s picture". At about the same time, Isaac Oliver was paid £5.10s.0d. for each of three miniatures of the prince. Murray's accounts reveal, however, that the prince was paying more for tennis balls than for any picture.

Peake is also listed in Sir David Murray's accounts for the period between 1 October 1610 and 6 November 1612, drawn up to the day on which Henry, Prince of Wales, died, possibly of typhoid fever, at the age of eighteen: "To Mr Peake for pictures and frames £12; two great pictures of the Prince in arms at length sent beyond the seas £50; and to him for washing, scouring and dressing of pictures and making of frames £20.4s.0d". Peake is listed in the accounts for Henry's funeral under "Artificers and officers of the Works" as "Mr Peake the elder painter". He was allotted seven yards of mourning cloth, plus four for his servant. Also listed is "Mr Peake the younger painter", meaning Robert's son William, who was allotted four yards of mourning cloth.

After the prince's death, Peake moved on to the household of Henry's brother, Charles, Duke of York, the future Charles I of England. Accounts for 1616 call Peake the Prince's painter, recording that he was paid £35 for "three several pictures of his Highness". On 10 July 1613, he was paid £13.6s.8d. by the vice-chancellor of the University of Cambridge, "in full satisfaction for Prince Charles his picture", for a full-length portrait which is still in the Cambridge University Library.

=== Death ===
Peake died in 1619, in the middle of October, as his will shows. Until relatively recently, it was believed that Peake died later. Erna Auerbach, put his death at around 1625, and the catalogue for the 1972 The Age of Charles I exhibition at the Tate Gallery suggested Peake was active as late as 1635. His will was made on 10 October 1619 and proved on the 16th.

The date of his burial is unknown because the registers of his parish church, St Sepulchre-without-Newgate, were destroyed in the Great Fire of London. This was a time of several deaths in the artistic community. Nicholas Hilliard had died in January 1619; Anne of Denmark, who had done so much to patronise the arts, in March; and the painter William Larkin, Peake's neighbour, in April or May. Though James I reigned until 1625, art historian Roy Strong considers that the year 1619 "can satisfactorily be accepted as the terminal date of Jacobean painting".

== Paintings ==
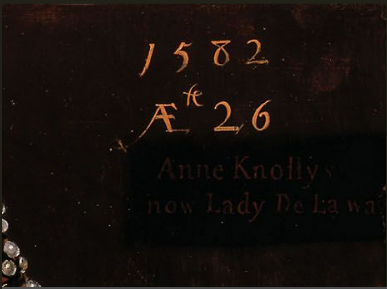
Inscription on the portrait of Anne Knollys

It is difficult to attribute and date portraits of this period because painters rarely signed their work, and their workshops produced portraits en masse, often sharing standard portrait patterns. Some paintings, however, have been attributed to Peake on the basis of the method of inscribing the year and the sitter's age on his documented portrait of a "military commander" (1592), which reads: "M.BY.RO.| PEAKE" ("made by Robert Peake"). Art historian Ellis Waterhouse, however, suspected that the letterer may have worked for more than one studio.

=== Procession Picture ===
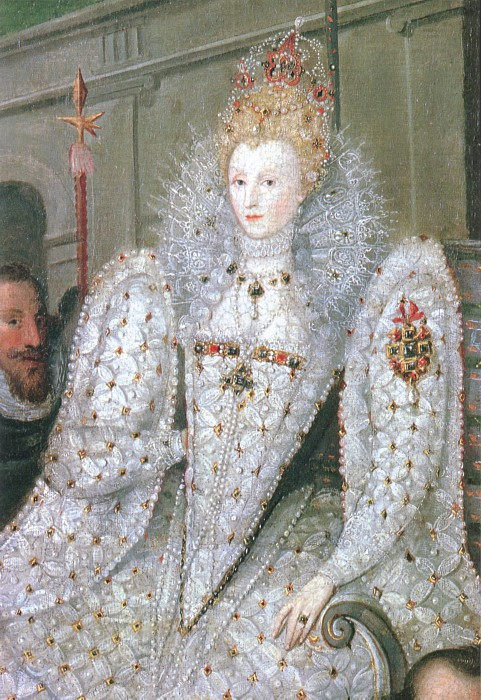
The Procession Picture (detail), c. 1600

The painting known as Queen Elizabeth going in procession to Blackfriars in 1601, or simply The Procession Picture (see illustration), is now often accepted as the work of Peake. The attribution was made by Roy Strong, who called it "one of the great visual mysteries of the Elizabethan age". It is an example of the convention, prevalent in the later part of her reign, of painting Elizabeth as an icon, portraying her as much younger and more triumphant than she was. As Strong puts it, "[t]his is Gloriana in her sunset glory, the mistress of the set piece, of the calculated spectacular presentation of herself to her adoring subjects". George Vertue, the eighteenth-century antiquarian, called the painting "not well nor ill done".

Strong reveals that the procession was connected to the marriage of Henry Somerset, Lord Herbert, and Lady Anne Russell, one of the queen's six maids of honour, on 16 June 1600. He identifies many of the individuals portrayed in the procession and shows that instead of a litter, as was previously assumed, Queen Elizabeth is sitting on a wheeled cart or chariot. Strong also suggests that the landscape and castles in the background are not intended to be realistic. In accordance with Elizabethan stylistic conventions, they are emblematic, here representing the Welsh properties of Edward Somerset, Earl of Worcester, to which his son Lord Herbert was the heir. The earl may have commissioned the picture to celebrate his appointment as Master of the Queen's Horse in 1601.

Peake clearly did not paint the queen, or indeed the courtiers, from life but from the "types" or standard portraits used by the workshops of the day. Portraits of the queen were subject to restrictions, and from about 1594 there seems to have been an official policy that she always be depicted as youthful. In 1594, the Privy council ordered that unseemly portraits of the queen be found and destroyed, since they caused Elizabeth "great offence". The famous Ditchley portrait (c. 1592), by Marcus Gheeraerts the Younger, was used as a type, sometimes called the "Mask of Youth" face-pattern, for the remainder of the reign. It is clear that Gheeraerts' portrait provided the pattern for the queen's image in the procession picture. Other figures also show signs of being traced from patterns, leading to infelicities of perspective and proportion.

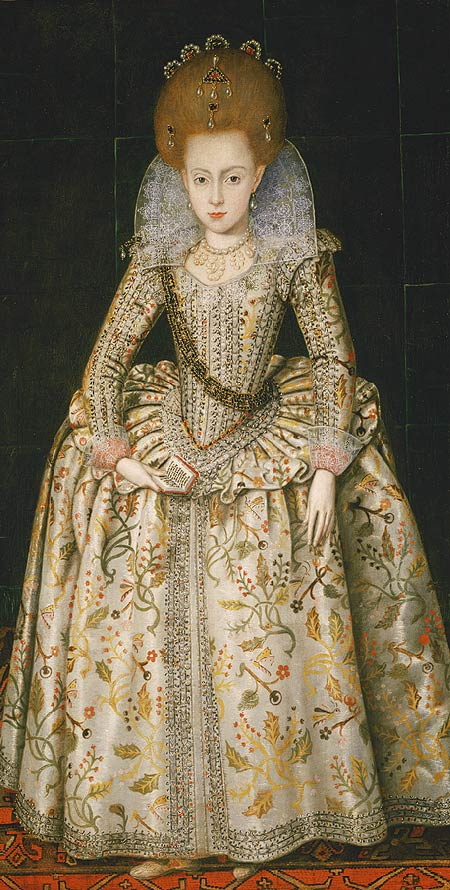
Princess Elizabeth, later Queen of Bohemia, 1606; her grandson inherited the English throne as George I.

=== Full-length portraits ===
At the beginning of the 1590s, the full-length portrait came into vogue and artistic patrons among the nobles began to add galleries of such paintings to their homes as a form of cultural ostentation. Peake was one of those who met the demand. He was also among the earliest English painters to explore the full-length individual or group portrait with active figures placed in a natural landscape, a style of painting that became fashionable in England. As principal painter to Prince Henry, Peake seems to have been charged with showing his patron as a dashing young warrior.

In 1603, he painted a double portrait, now in the Metropolitan Museum, New York, of the prince and his boyhood friend John Harington, son of Lord Harington of Exton (see above). The double portrait is set outdoors, a style introduced by Gheeraerts in the 1590s, and Peake's combination of figures with animals and landscape also foreshadows the genre of the sporting picture. The country location and recreational subject lend the painting an air of informality. The action is natural to the setting, a fenced deer-park with a castle and town in the distance. Harington holds a wounded stag by the antlers as Henry draws his sword to deliver the coup de grâce. The prince wears at his belt a jewel of St George slaying the dragon, an allusion to his role as defender of the realm. His sword is an attribute of kingship, and the young noble kneels in his service. The stag is a fallow deer, a non-native species kept at that time in royal parks for hunting. A variant of this painting in the Royal Collection, painted c. 1605, features Robert Devereux, 3rd Earl of Essex, in the place of John Harington and displays the Devereux arms.

In the same year, Peake also painted his first portrait of James I's only surviving daughter, Elizabeth. This work, like the double portrait, for which it might be a companion piece, appears to have been painted for the Harington family, who acted as Elizabeth's guardians from 1603 to 1608. In the background of Elizabeth's portrait is a hunting scene echoing that of the double portrait, and two ladies sit on an artificial mound of a type fashionable in garden design at the time.

Peake again painted Henry outdoors in about 1610. In this portrait, now at the Royal Palace of Turin, the prince looks hardly older than in the 1603 double portrait; but his left foot rests on a shield bearing the three-feathers device of the Prince of Wales, a title he did not hold until 1610. Henry is portrayed as a young man of action, about to draw a jewel-encrusted sword from its scabbard. The portrait was almost certainly sent to Savoy in connection with a marriage proposed in January 1611 between Henry and the Infanta Maria, daughter of Charles Emmanuel I, Duke of Savoy.

James I's daughter Elizabeth was also a valuable marriage pawn. She too was offered to Savoy, as a bride for the Prince of Piedmont, the heir of Charles Emanuel. The exchange of portraits as part of royal marriage proposals was the practice of the day and provided regular work for the royal painters and their workshops. Prince Henry commissioned portraits from Peake to send them to the various foreign courts with which marriage negotiations were underway. The prince's accounts show, for example, that the two portraits Peake painted of him in arms in 1611–12 were "sent beyond the seas".

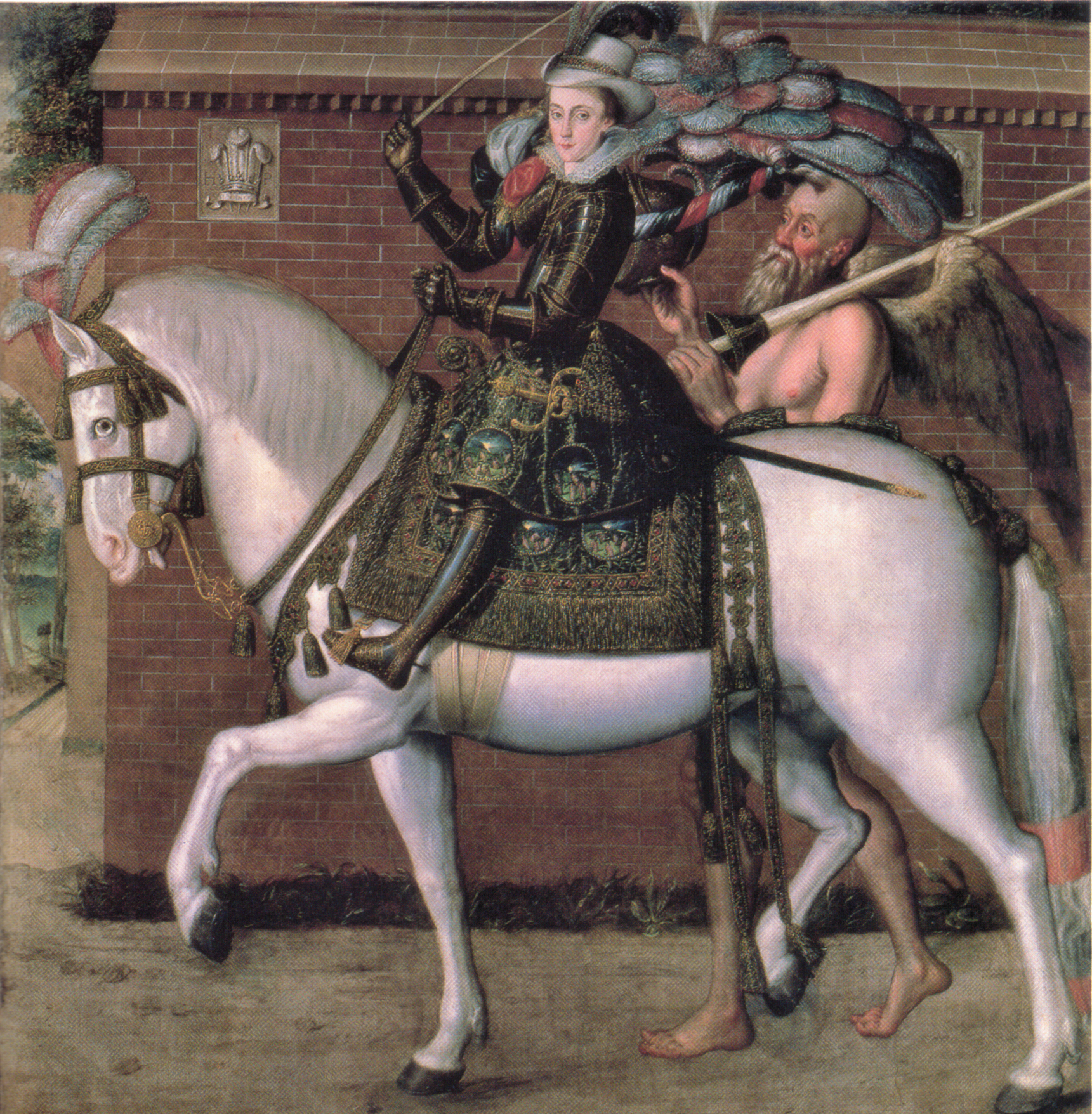
Henry, Prince of Wales, on Horseback, c. 1611. The winged figure of Time at right was revealed after cleaning.

A surviving portrait from this time shows the prince in armour, mounted on a white horse and pulling the winged figure of Father Time by the forelock. Art historian John Sheeran suggests this is a classical allusion that signifies opportunity. The old man carries Henry's lance and plumed helmet; and scholar Chris Caple points out that his pose is similar to that of Albrecht Dürer's figure of death in Knight, Death and the Devil (1513). He also observes that the old man was painted later than other components of the painting, since the bricks of the wall show through his wings. When the painting was restored in 1985, the wall and the figure of time were revealed to modern eyes for the first time, having been painted over at some point in the seventeenth century by other hands than Peake's. The painting has also been cut down, the only original canvas edge being that on the left.

=== Lady Elizabeth Pope ===
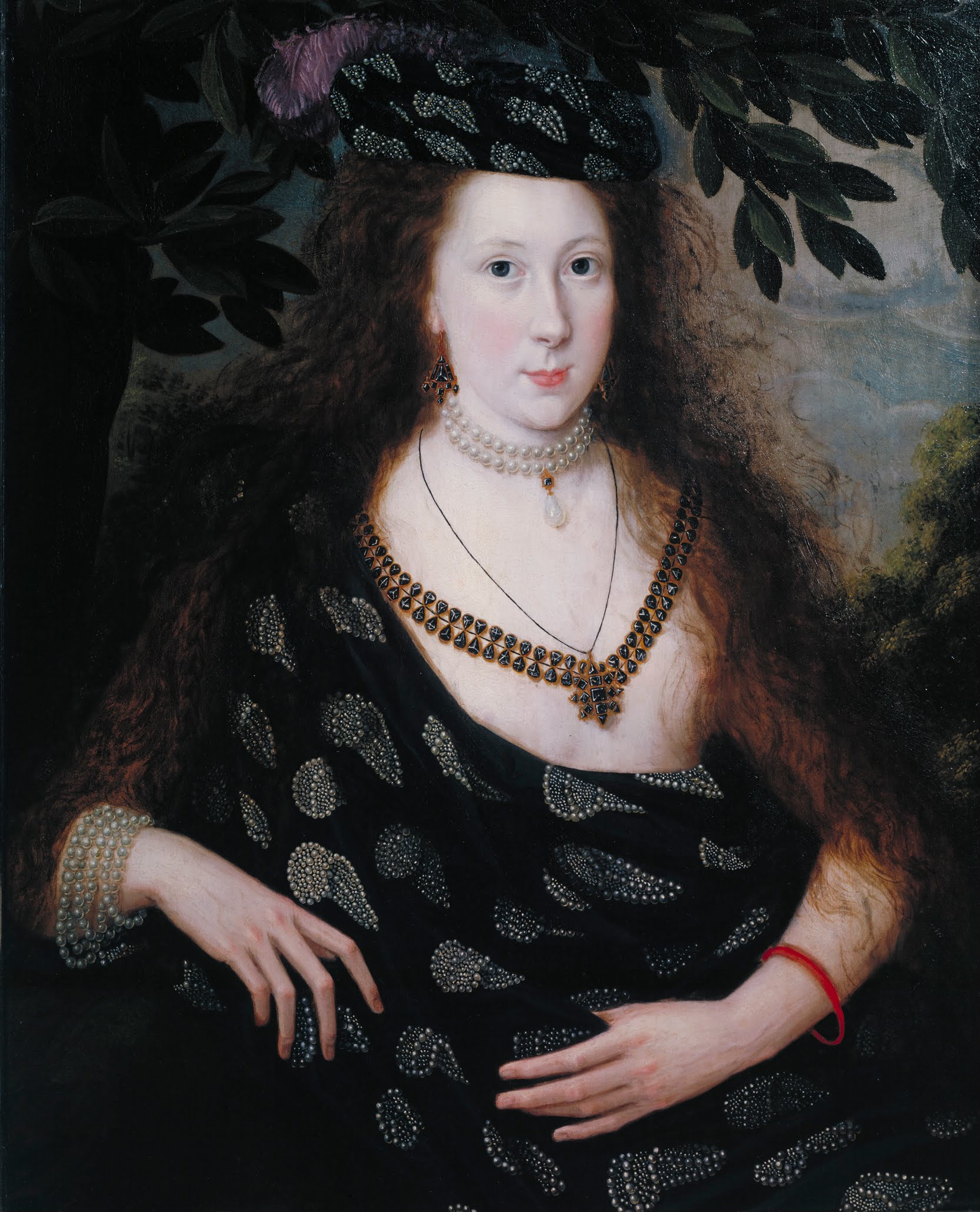
Lady Elizabeth Pope, wearing a draped mantle and matching turban, c. 1615

Peake's portrait of Lady Elizabeth Pope may have been commissioned by her husband, Sir William Pope, to commemorate their marriage in 1615. Lady Elizabeth is portrayed with her hair loose, a symbol of bridal virginity. She wears a draped mantle—embroidered with seed pearls in a pattern of ostrich plumes—and a matching turban. The mantle knotted on one shoulder was worn in Jacobean court masques, as the costume designs of Inigo Jones indicate. The painting's near-nudity, however, makes the depiction of an actual masque costume unlikely. Loose hair and the classical draped mantle also figure in contemporary personifications of abstract concepts in masques and paintings. Yale art historian Ellen Chirelstein argues that Peake is portraying Lady Elizabeth as a personification of America, since her father, Sir Thomas Watson, was a major shareholder in the Virginia Company.

=== Assessment ===
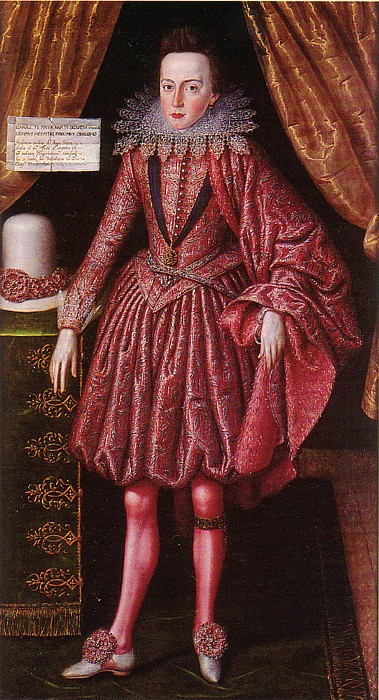
Prince Charles, as Duke of York, commissioned for the University of Cambridge, 1613

In 1598, Francis Meres, in his Palladis Tamia, included Peake on a list of the best English artists. In 1612, Henry Peacham wrote in The Gentleman's Exercise that his "good friend Mr Peake", along with Marcus Gheeraerts, was outstanding "for oil colours". Ellis Waterhouse suggested that the genre of elaborate costume pieces was as much a decorative as a plastic art. He notes that these works, the "enamelled brilliance" of which has become apparent through cleaning, are unique in European art and deserve respect. They were produced chiefly by the workshops of Peake, Gheeraerts the Younger, and De Critz. Sheeran detects the influence of Hilliard's brightly patterned and coloured miniatures in Peake's work and places Peake firmly in the "iconic tradition of late Elizabethan painting". He employed techniques from European Mannerism and followed the artificial and decorative style characteristic of Elizabethan painting. By the time he was appointed serjeant-painter in 1607, his compelling and semi-naive style was somewhat old fashioned compared with De Critz and other contemporaries. However, Peake's portraits of Prince Henry are the first to show his subject in ‘action’ poses.

=== Cambridge portrait of Charles as Duke of York ===
John Sheeran believes that Peake's creativity waned into conservatism, his talent "dampened by mass production". He describes Peake's Cambridge portrait, Prince Charles, as Duke of York as poorly drawn, with a lifeless pose, in a stereotyped composition that "confirms the artist's reliance on a much repeated formula in his later years". Catherine MacLeod describes a "very traditional composition" that may have been required by the corporate patron. Karen Hearn, on the other hand, praises the work as "magnificent" and draws attention to the naturalistically rendered note pinned to the curtain.

Peake painted the portrait to mark Charles's visit to Cambridge on 3 and 4 March 1613, during which he was awarded an M.A.—four months after the death of his brother. Depicting Prince Charles wearing the Garter and Lesser George, Peake here reverts to a more formal, traditional style of portraiture. The note pinned to a curtain of cloth of gold, painted in trompe-l'œil fashion, commemorates Charles's visit in Latin. X-rays of the portrait reveal that Peake painted it over another portrait. Pentimenti, or signs of alteration, can be detected: for example, Charles's right hand originally rested on his waist.

== Gallery ==
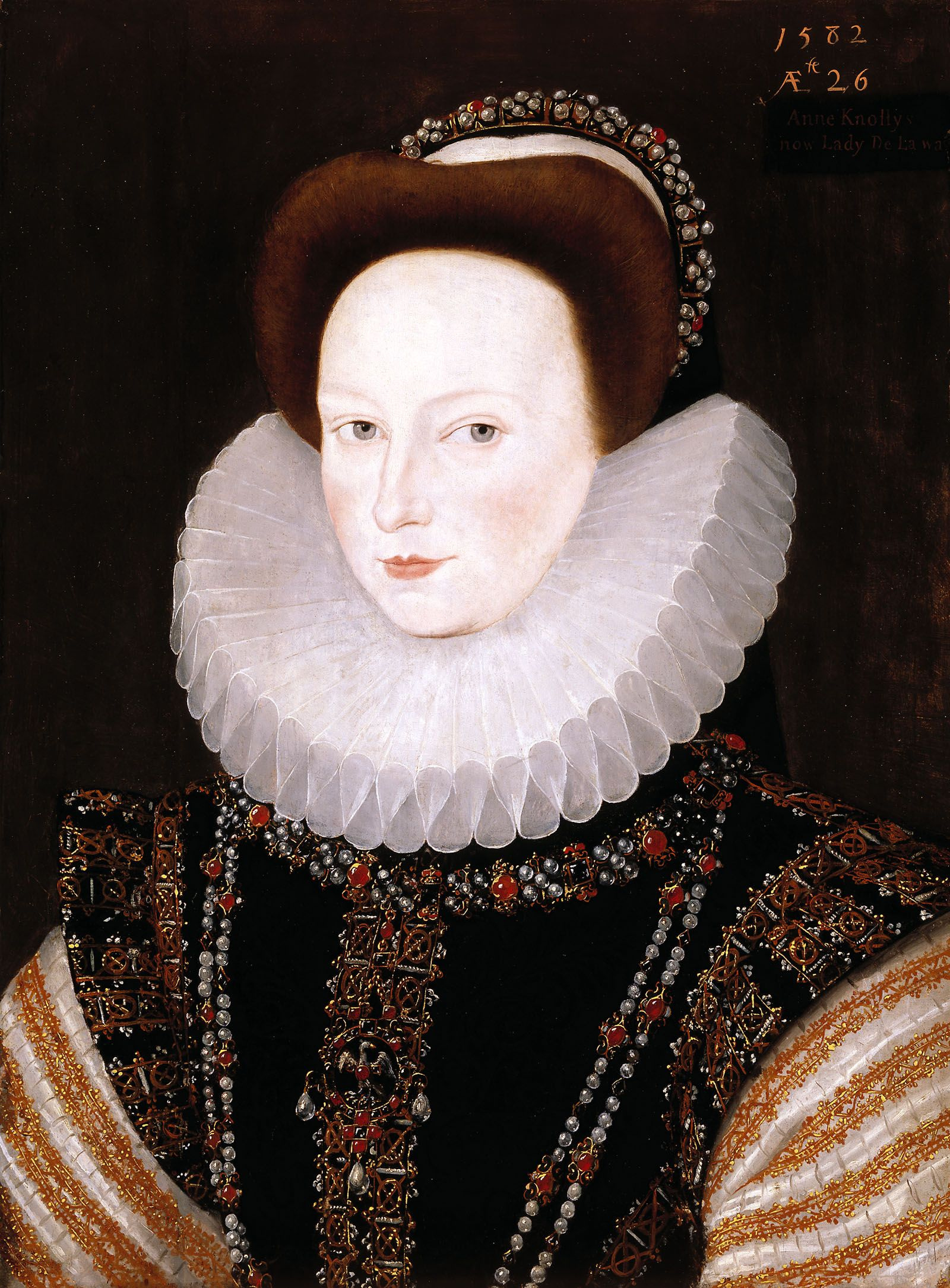
Portrait of Anne Knollys, 1582. Attributed to Robert Peake by the Berger Collection, Denver Art Museum

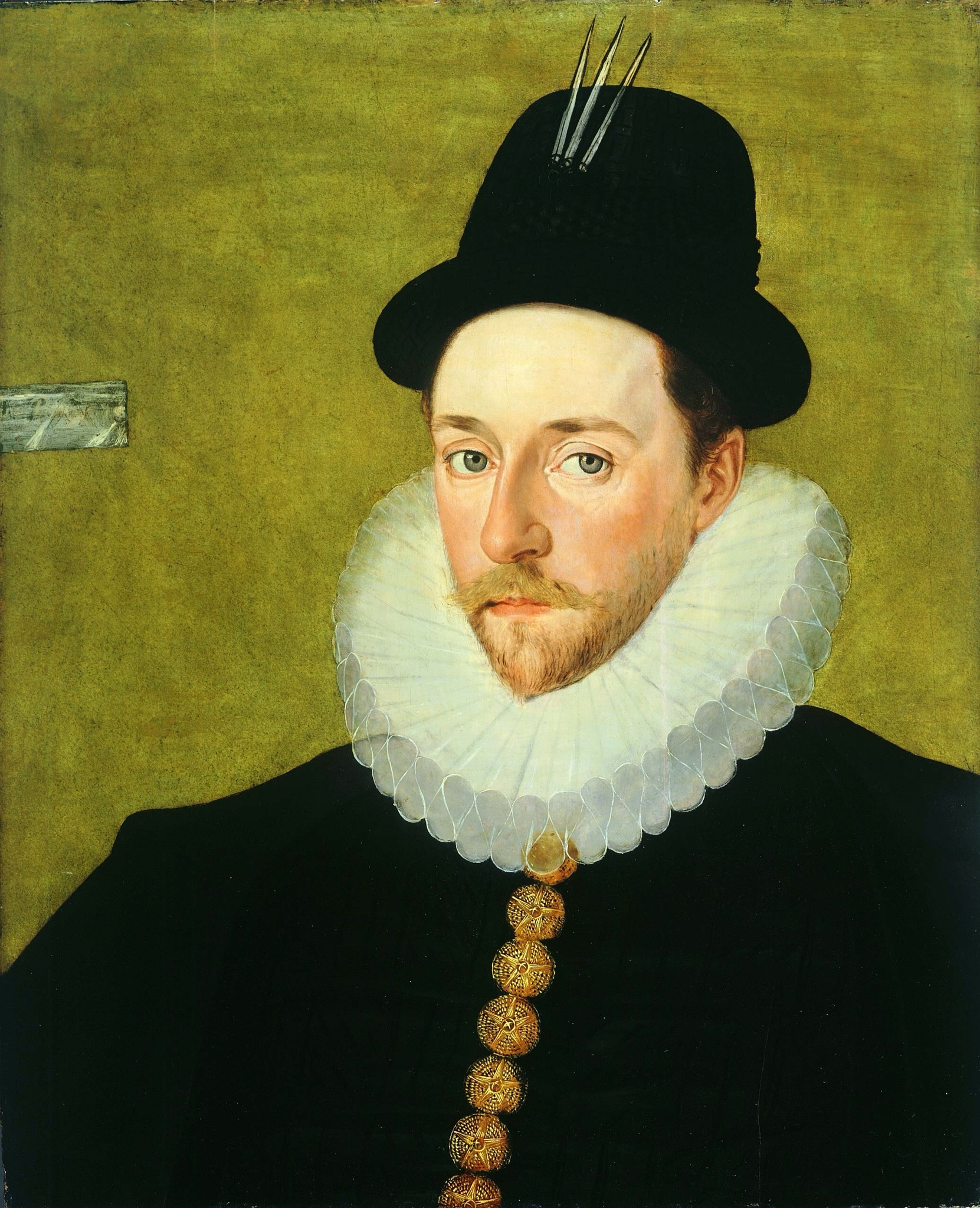
Peregrine Bertie, c. 1585–90. Inscribed with the Lumley cartellino, centre left

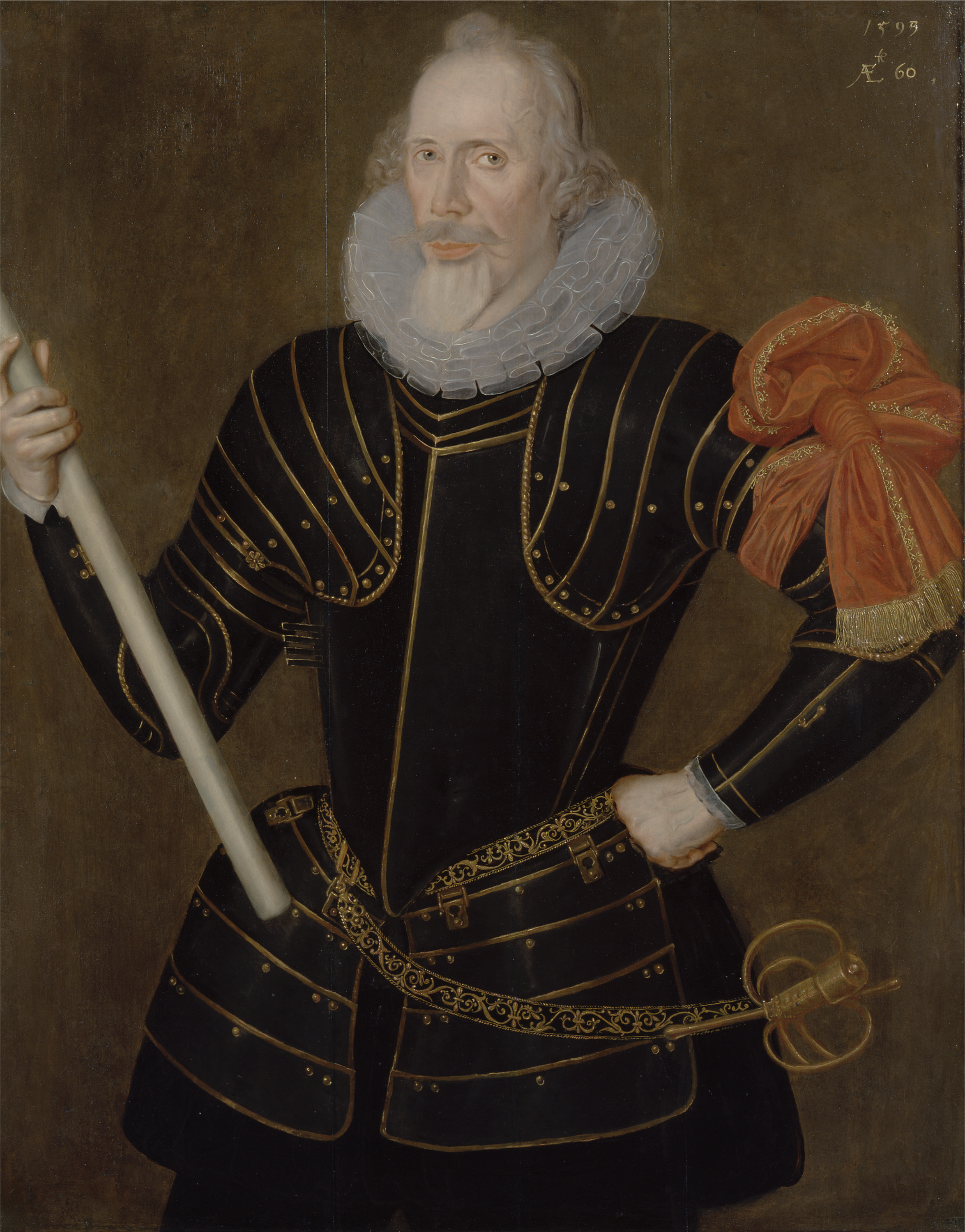
Portrait of a Man (Unknown Military Commander, Aged 60), 1593. Paul Mellon Center for British Art, Yale

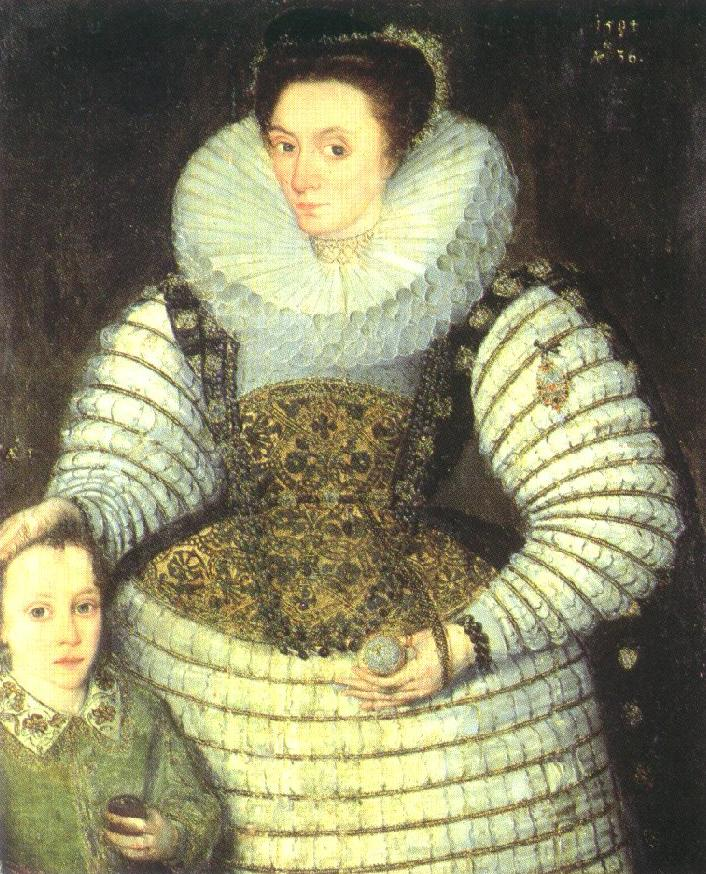
Frances Walsingham, Countess of Essex, and her son Robert, later 3rd Earl of Essex, 1594

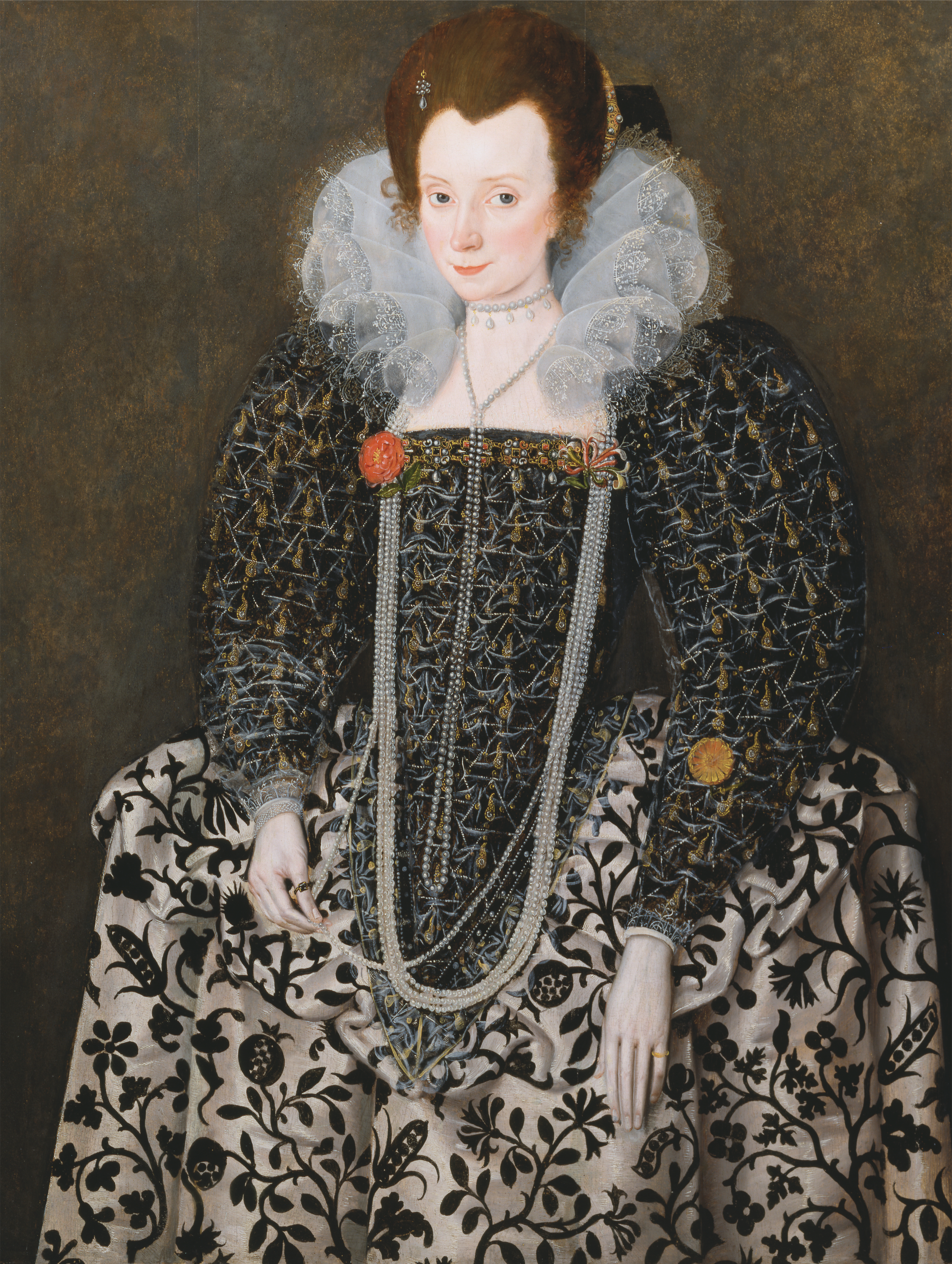
Portrait of a Woman, 1600. Paul Mellon Center for British Art, Yale

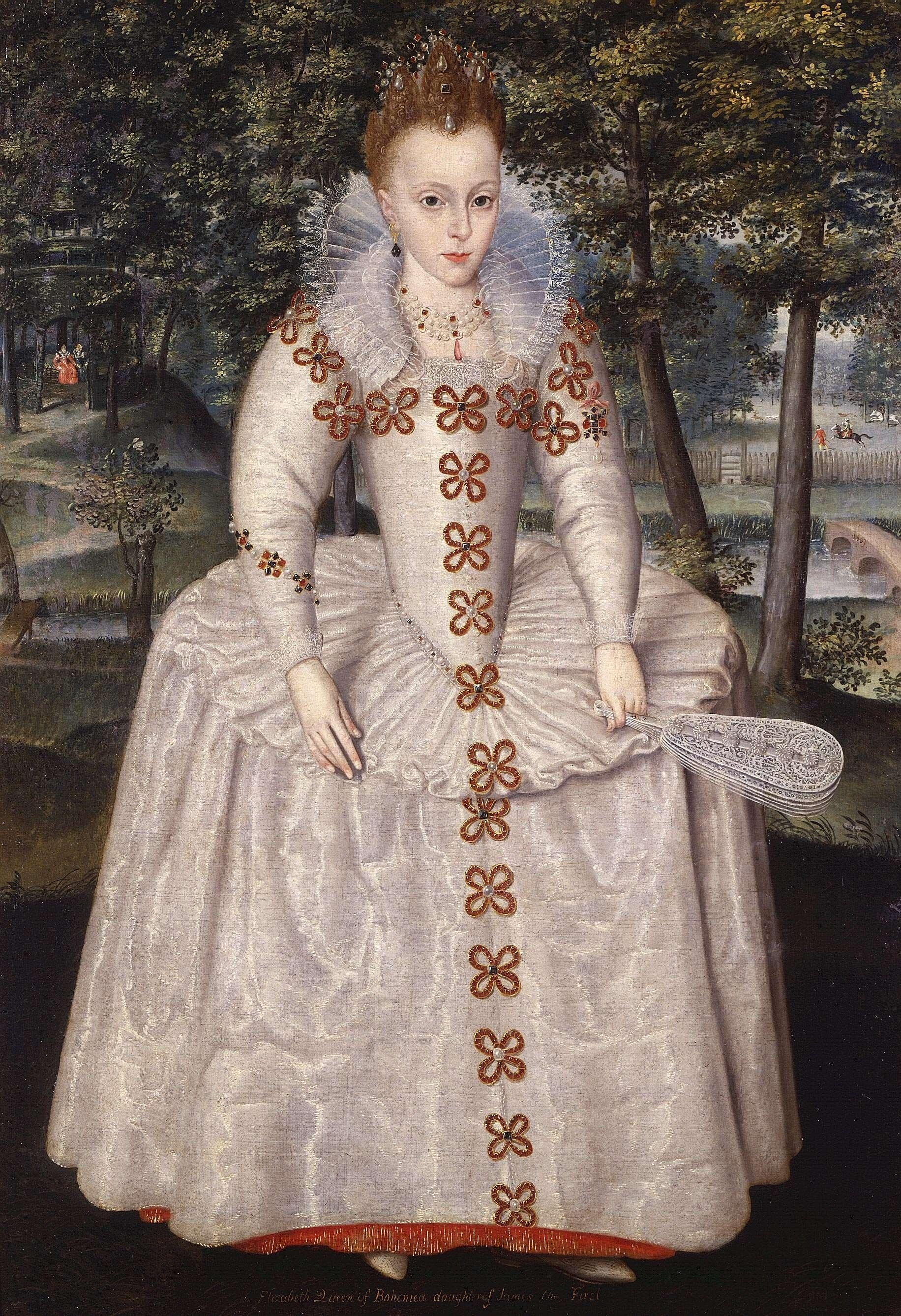
The first known portrait of Princess Elizabeth, 1603—possibly a companion piece to Peake's double portrait of the same year

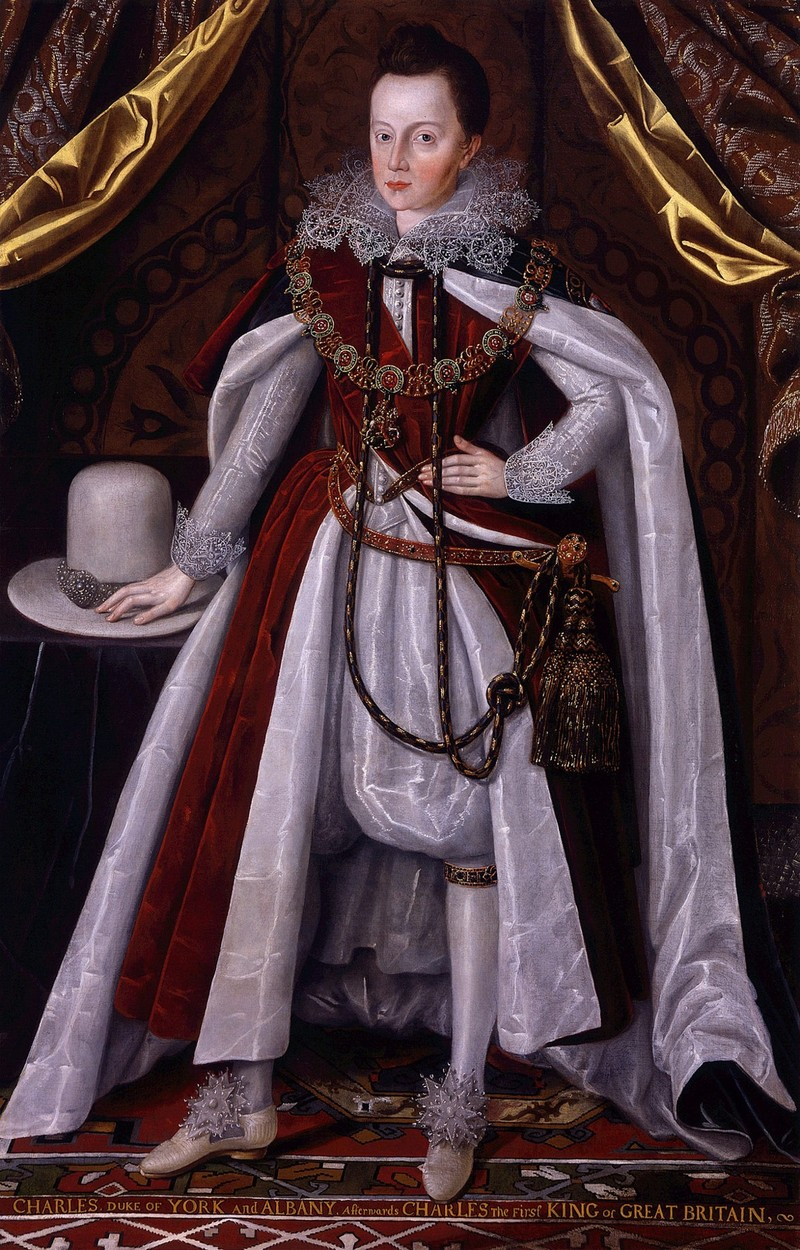
After Prince Henry's death in 1612, Peake moved on to the household of his brother, the future Charles I of England, portrayed here in the robes of the Order of the Garter, c. 1611–12.

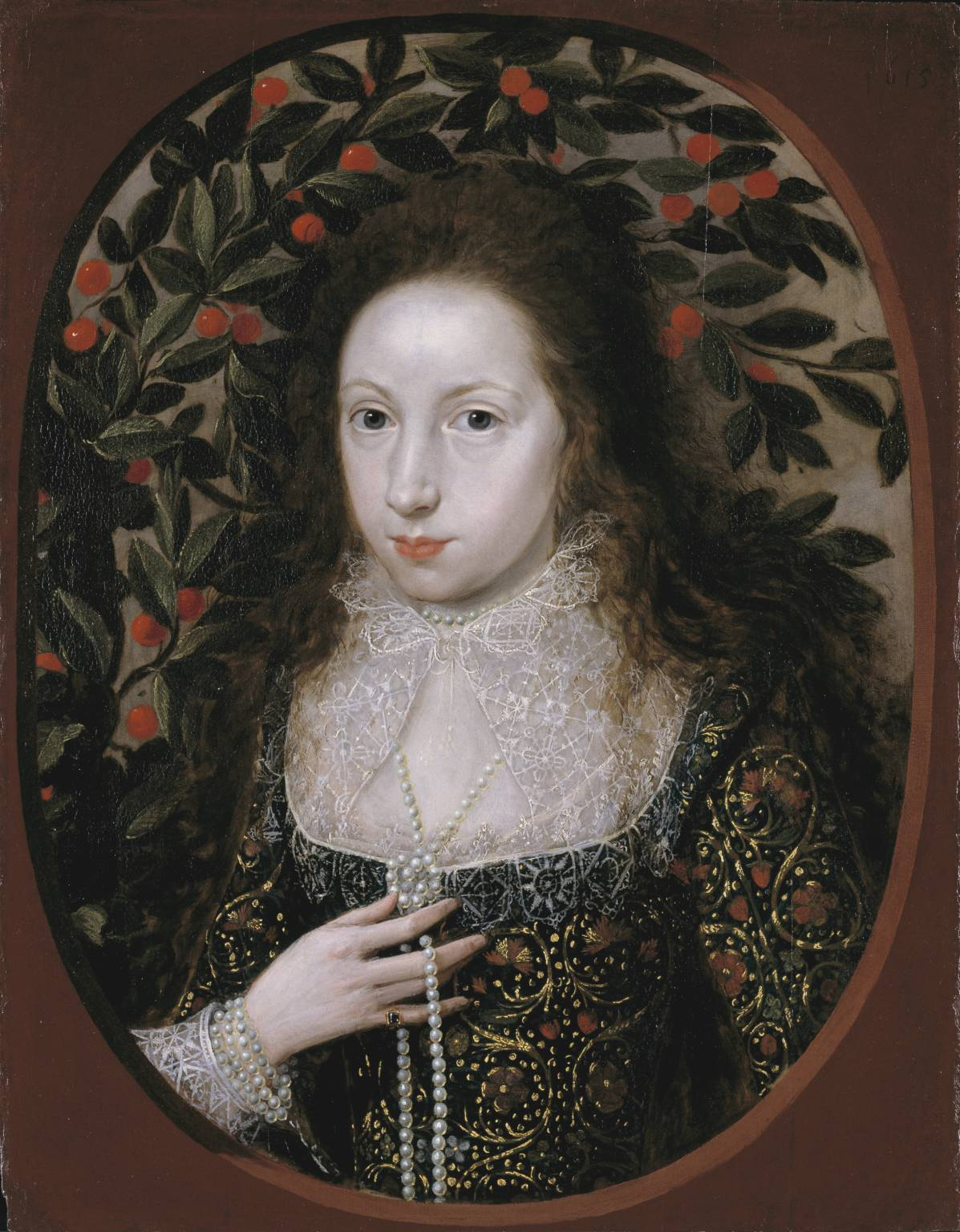
Lady Anne Pope, sister-in-law of Elizabeth Pope, 1615. Her dress is patterned with carnations, roses and strawberries; the cherries on the tree symbolise virtue.

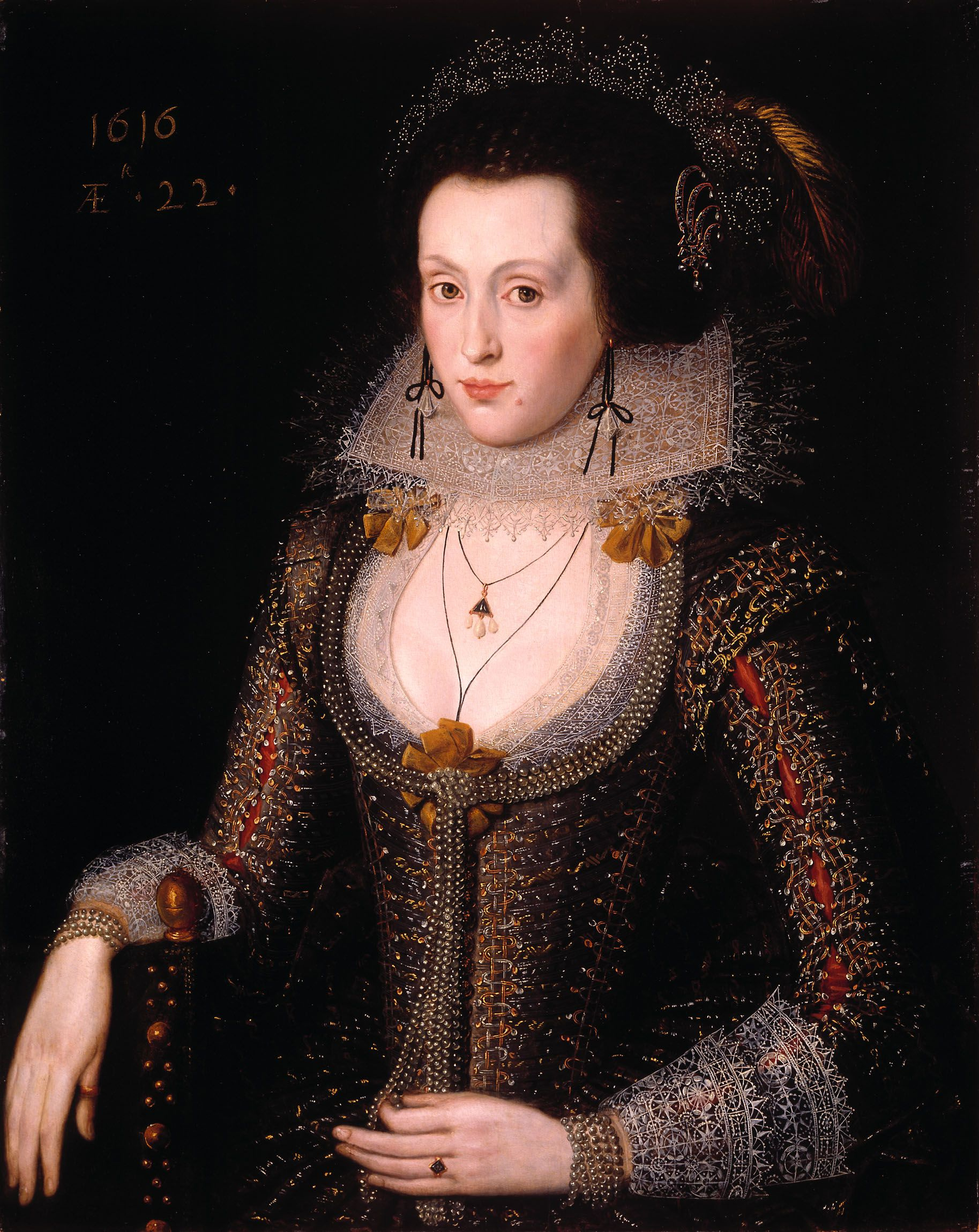
Elizabeth Poulett, 1616. The sitter wears a jewelled and feathered caul, a type of indoor headdress. The spot on her face is a fashionable patch of velvet or silk, glued to her skin.

== See also ==
- Artists of the Tudor court

== Bibliography ==
- Auerbach, Erna. Tudor artists; a study of painters in the royal service and of portraiture on illuminated documents from the accession of Henry VIII to the death of Elizabeth I. London: University of London, Athlone Press, 1954. OCLC 1293216.
- Caple. Objects. London: Routledge, 2006. ISBN 0-415-30589-6.
- Chamberlain, John. The Chamberlain Letters. Edited by Elizabeth Thomson. New York: Capricorn, 1966. OCLC 37697217.
- Chirelstein, Ellen. "Lady Elizabeth Pope: The Heraldic Body." In Renaissance Bodies: The Human Figure in English Culture, c. 1540–1660, edited by Lucy Gent and Nigel Llewellyn, 36–59. London: Reaktion Books, 1990. ISBN 0-948462-08-6.
- Edmond, Mary. Hilliard and Oliver: The Lives and Works of Two Great Miniaturists. London: Robert Hale, 1983. ISBN 0-7090-0927-5.
- Edmond, Mary. "New Light on Jacobean Painters". The Burlington Magazine 118 (February 1976): 74–83.
- Gaunt, William. Court Painting in England from Tudor to Victorian Times. London: Constable, 1980. ISBN 0-09-461870-4.
- Haigh, Christopher. Elizabeth I. London: Pearson Longman, 1999. ISBN 0-582-43754-7.
- Hearn, Karen. Dynasties: Painting in Tudor and Jacobean England, 1530–1630. London: Tate Publishing, 1995. ISBN 1-85437-157-6.
- Kitson, Michael. British Painting, 1600–1800. Melbourne: National Gallery of Victoria, 1977. ISBN 0-7241-0043-1.
- Ribeiro, Aileen. Fashion and Fiction: Dress in Art and Literature in Stuart England. New Haven, CT: Yale University Press, 2005. ISBN 0-300-10999-7.
- Stewart, Alan. The Cradle King: A Life of James VI & I. London: Chatto and Windus, 2003. ISBN 0-7011-6984-2.
- Strong, Roy. The Cult of Elizabeth: Elizabethan Portraiture and Pageantry. London: Pimlico, 1999. ISBN 0-7126-6481-5.
- Strong, Roy. "Elizabethan Painting: An Approach Through Inscriptions. 1: Robert Peake the Elder." The Burlington Magazine 105 (February 1963): 53–57.
- Strong, Roy. The English Icon: Elizabethan and Jacobean Portraiture. London: Paul Mellon Foundation for British Art; New York: Pantheon Books, 1969. OCLC 78970800.
- Strong, Roy. Gloriana. London: Pimlico, 2003. ISBN 0-7126-0944-X.
- Walpole, Horace. Anecdotes of Painting in England: With Some Account of the Principal Artists, and Notes on other Arts, Collected by the Late George Vertue. Vol II. London: Henry. G. Bohn, 1849. Full view from Google Books. Retrieved on 1 January 2008.
- Waterhouse, Ellis. Painting in Britain, 1530–1790. 3rd ed. London: Penguin, 1978. ISBN 0-14-056101-3.
- Weiss Gallery. A Fashionable Likeness: Early Portraiture, 1550–1710. London: Weiss Gallery, 2006. OCLC 75489656.
- Weiss Gallery. A Noble Visage: a Catalogue of Early Portraiture, 1545–1660. London: Weiss Gallery, 2001. OCLC 80022178.
