= Edward Calver =

English poet

Edward Calver (fl. 1649) was an English poet, said to be a lay Puritan. Little is recorded of his life.

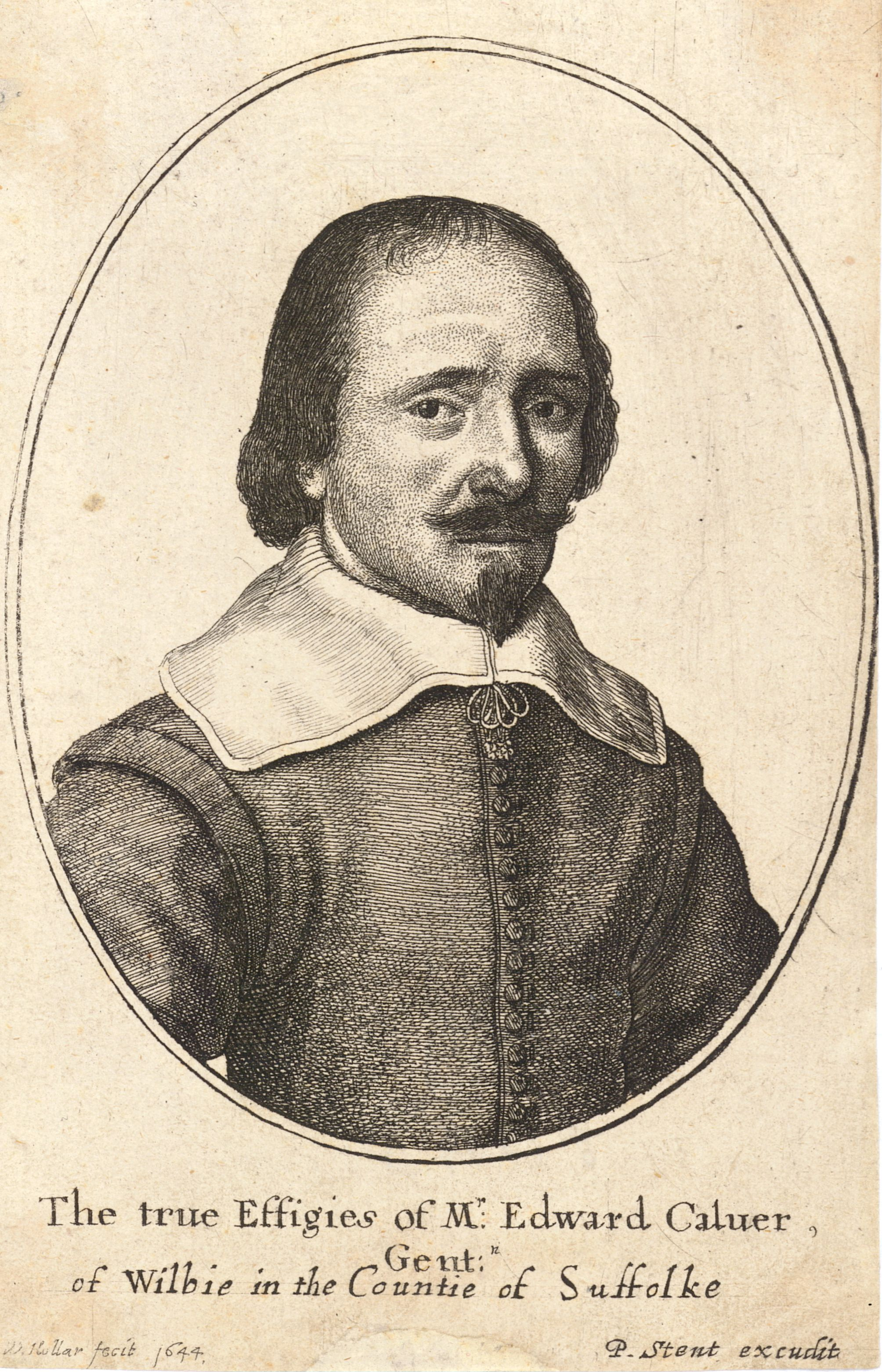
Edward Calver of Wilby, Suffolk, engraving by Wenceslas Hollar

== Works ==
Calver's works include:

- Passion and Discretion, in Youth and Age, London, 1641. The work is divided into two books, the second of which has a prose epistle to his friend and kinsman John Strut. The work contains moral reflections on the passions, and was illustrated by Peter Stent.
- Divine Passions, piously and pathetically expressed, in three books, London, 1643.
- Englands Sad Posture; or, A true Description of the present Estate of poore distressed England, and of the lamentable Condition of these distracted times, since the beginning of this Civill and unnaturall Warr. Presented to the Right Honourable, Pious, and Valiant Edward Earle of Manchester, London, 1644, With portraits of the Earl of Manchester, engraved by Thomas Cross, and of the author, engraved by Hollar.
- Calvers Royal Vision; with his most humble addresses to his majesties royall person, in verse, London, 1648.
- Englands Fortresse, exemplified in the most renowned and victorious, his Excellency the Lord Fairfax. Humbly presented unto his Excellency by E. C., a lover of peace, a eulogy in verse, London, 1648.
- Zion's thankfull Echoes from the Clifts of Ireland. Of the little Church of Christ in Ireland, warbling out the humble and gratefull addresses to her elder sister in England. And in particular to the Parliament, to his Excellency, and to his Army, or that part assigned to her assistance, now in her low, yet hopeful condition, London, 1649.
