= Hartgill =

Hartgill is a surname. Notable people with the surname include:

- Edward Hartgill, High Sheriff of Wiltshire
- George Hartgill, English astronomer
