= Barbara van Beck =

German woman with hypertrichosis (1629–c. 1668)

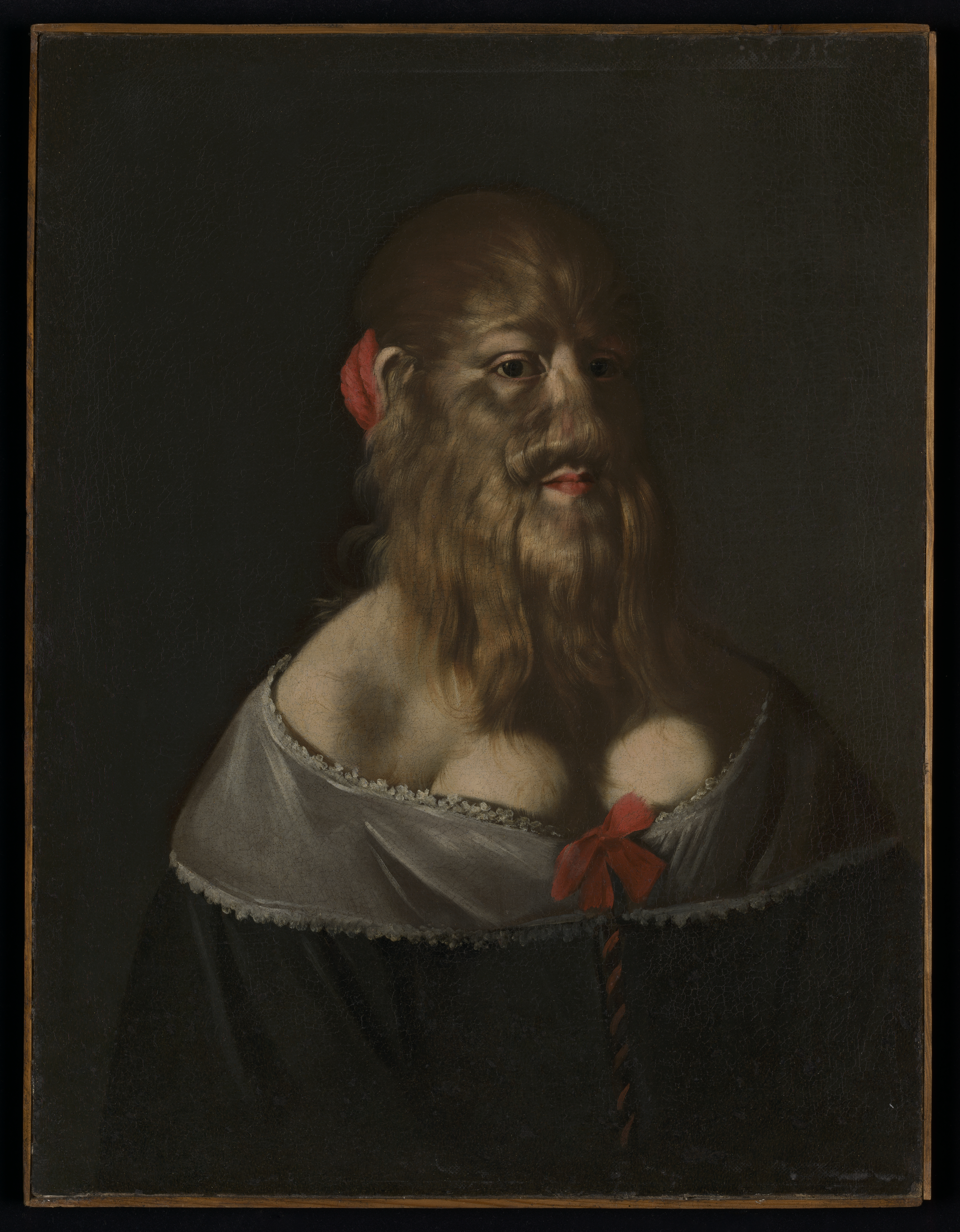
- Portrait of van Beck by an unknown painter
- Born: Barbara Ursler; 16 February 1629; Augsburg, Germany
- Died: c. 1668 (aged 39-40)
- Known for: Having hypertrichosis, playing the harpsichord
- Spouse: Johan Michael van Beck

Barbara van Beck (16 February 1629 – 1668?) was a German woman known for having her face and much of her body covered with hair.

== Early life ==
Barbara Ursler was born in Augsburg, Germany, in 1629. Her parents were Anne and Balthazar Ursler. The Urslers exhibited her at shows, but also educated their daughter. She later married Johan Michael van Beck and became Barbara van Beck. The couple had one child and her husband became her manager. He reportedly married her for the purposes of making money through his wife's appearance in shows.

== Public appearances ==
Barbara van Beck became internationally renowned and travelled Europe, appearing in shows. In 1655, van Beck travelled to London for the first time. In 1657, John Evelyn recorded seeing her at a show with other notable performers of the period. He wrote that she "played well on the harpsichord." Evelyn's friend Samuel Pepys described having seen a woman with a similar condition in subsequent diaries, and there is debate over whether this is the same individual.

Barbara van Beck made a public appearance in Beauvais in 1660. An etching of her portrait by Richard Gaywood was used to advertise this show, and a copy was sent to local authorities to obtain permission for the show. By this point, van Beck was already becoming a celebrity: her request to appear notes that she had already received attention in Paris (where she had appeared in 1645) and other French cities.

In 1668, van Beck appeared in London and was seen by Holger Jacobsen who wrote about her for Thomas Bartholin's book Acta Medica et Philosophica Hafnensis. He was struck by the length and softness of her hair, and reported examining her genitals to see whether they resembled those of a monkey. After 1668, there are no mentions of van Beck, and some have speculated that she may have died in this year.

== Condition ==
Barbara van Beck is believed to have had the condition hypertrichosis, also called Ambras syndrome.

== Depictions ==
Engravings depicting Barbara van Beck
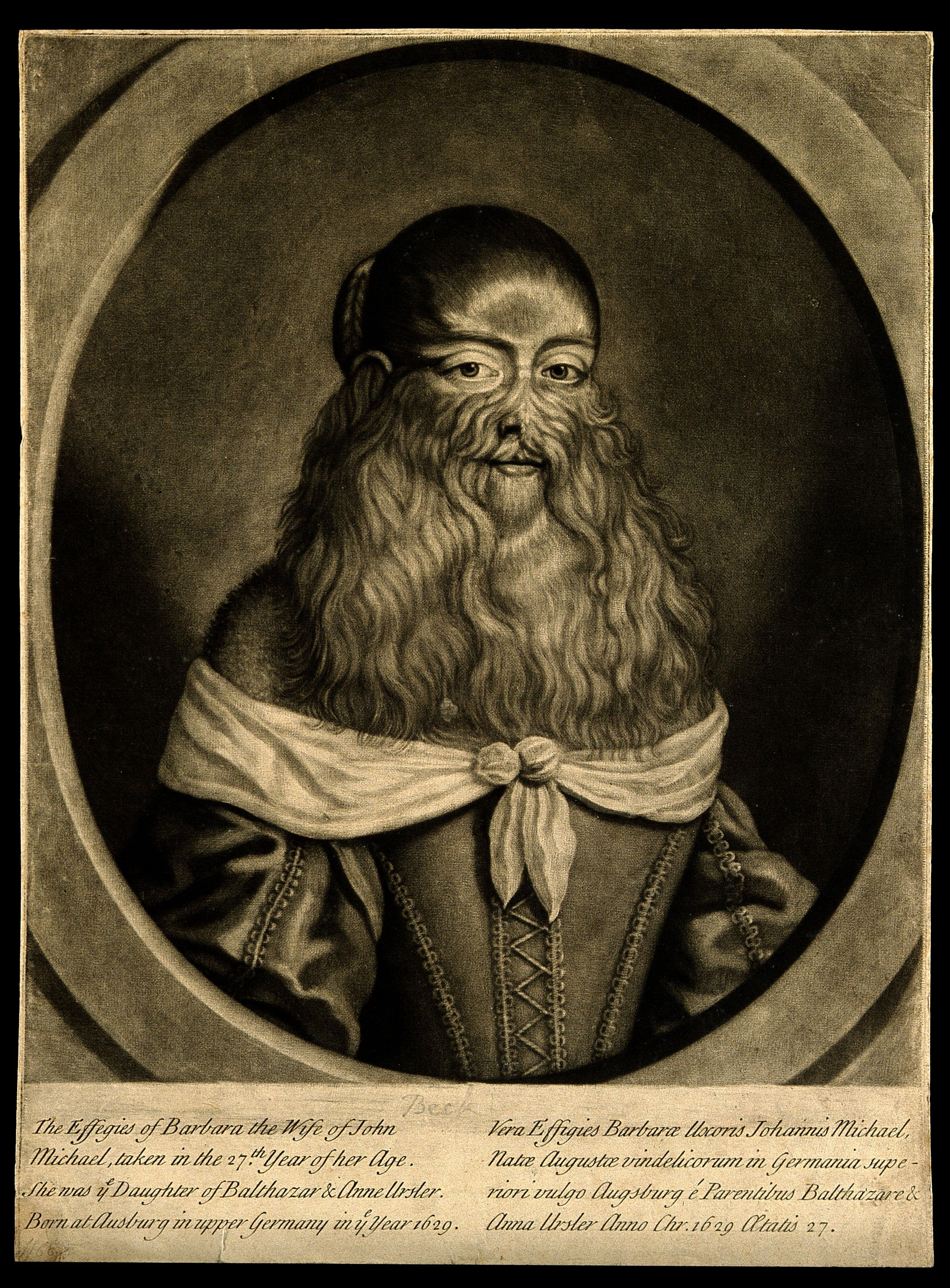
Engraving of van Beck by G. Scott.

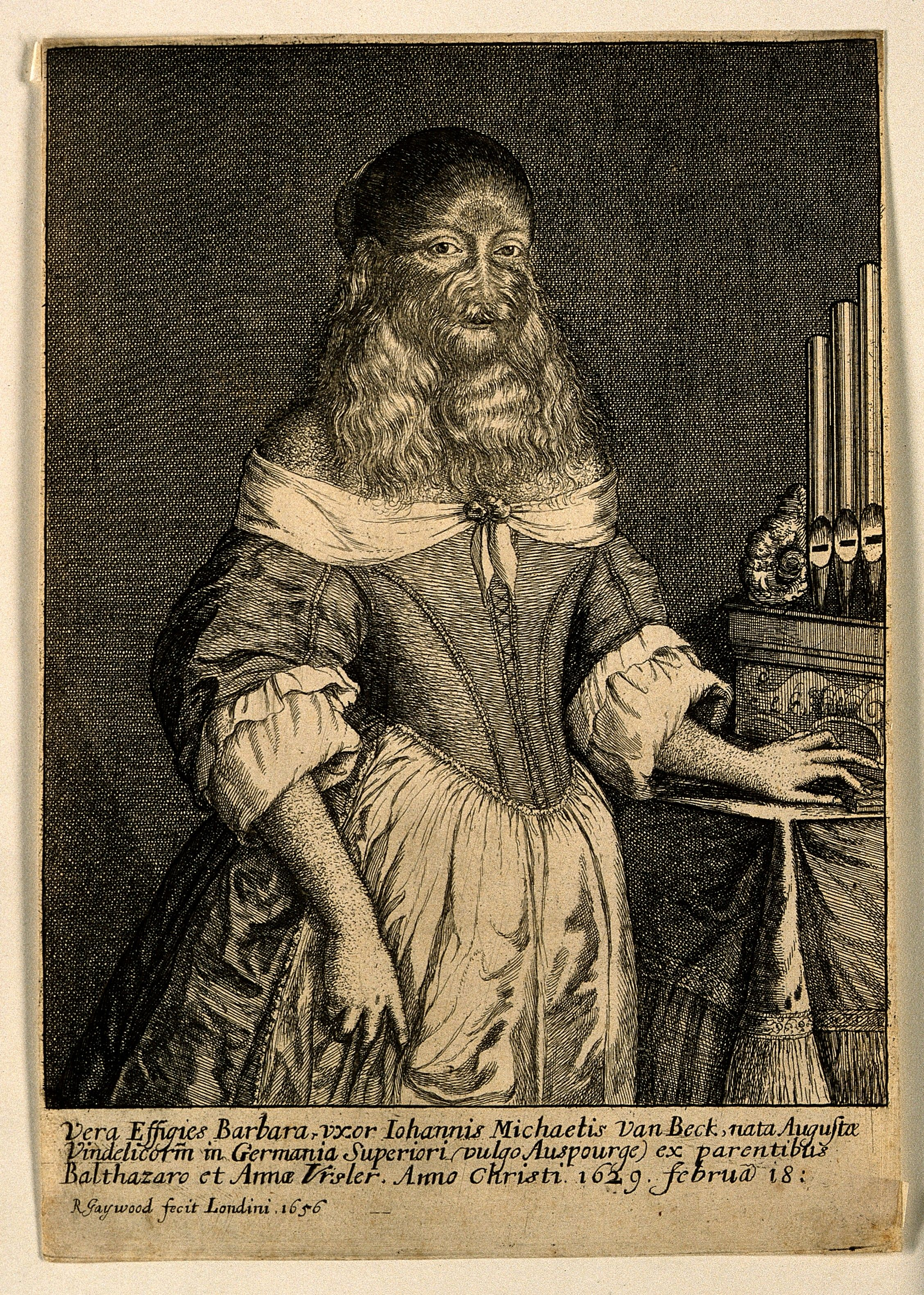
Portrait of van Beck beside an organ by Richard Gaywood

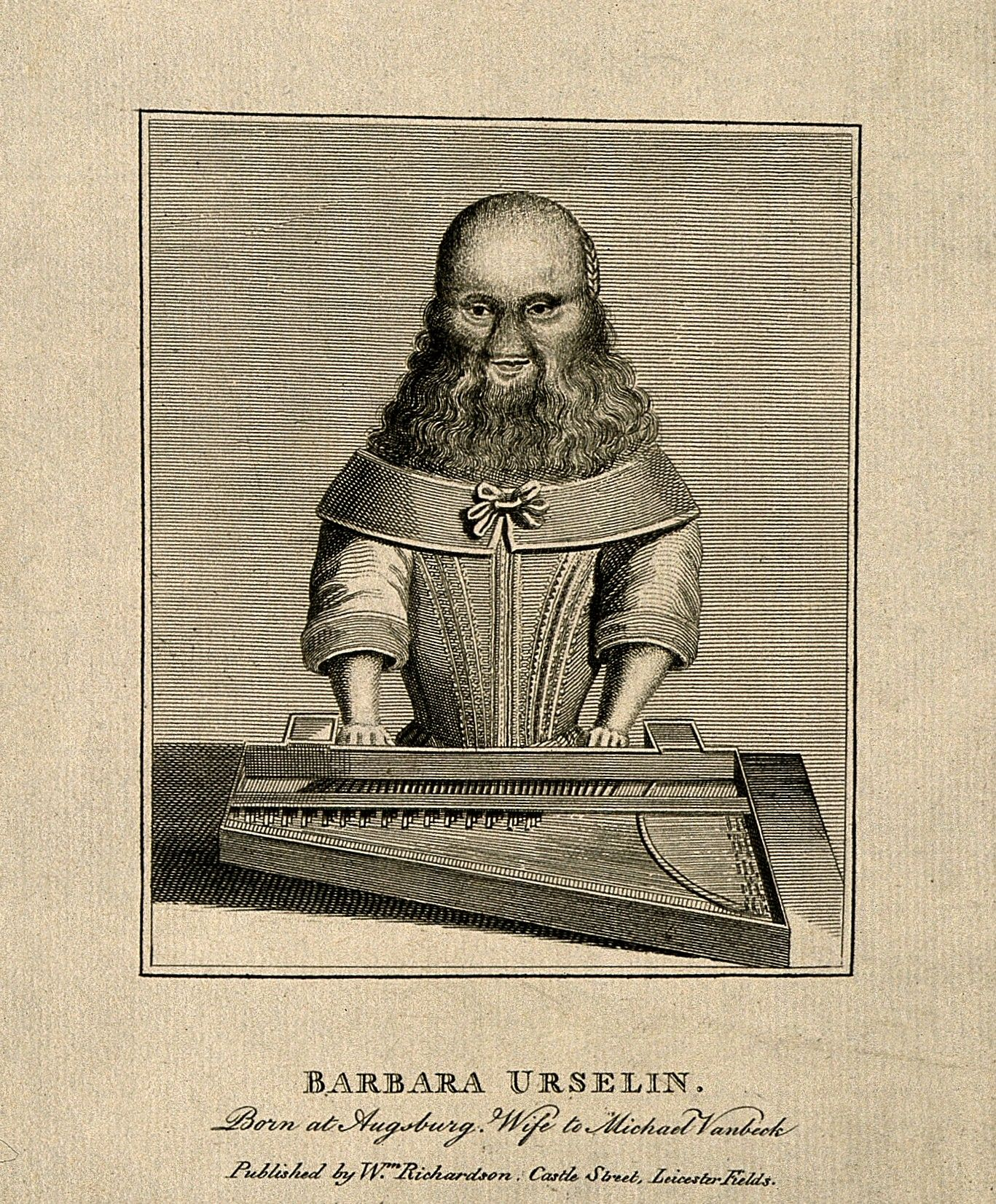
Barbara van Beck playing the harpsichord published by William Richardson

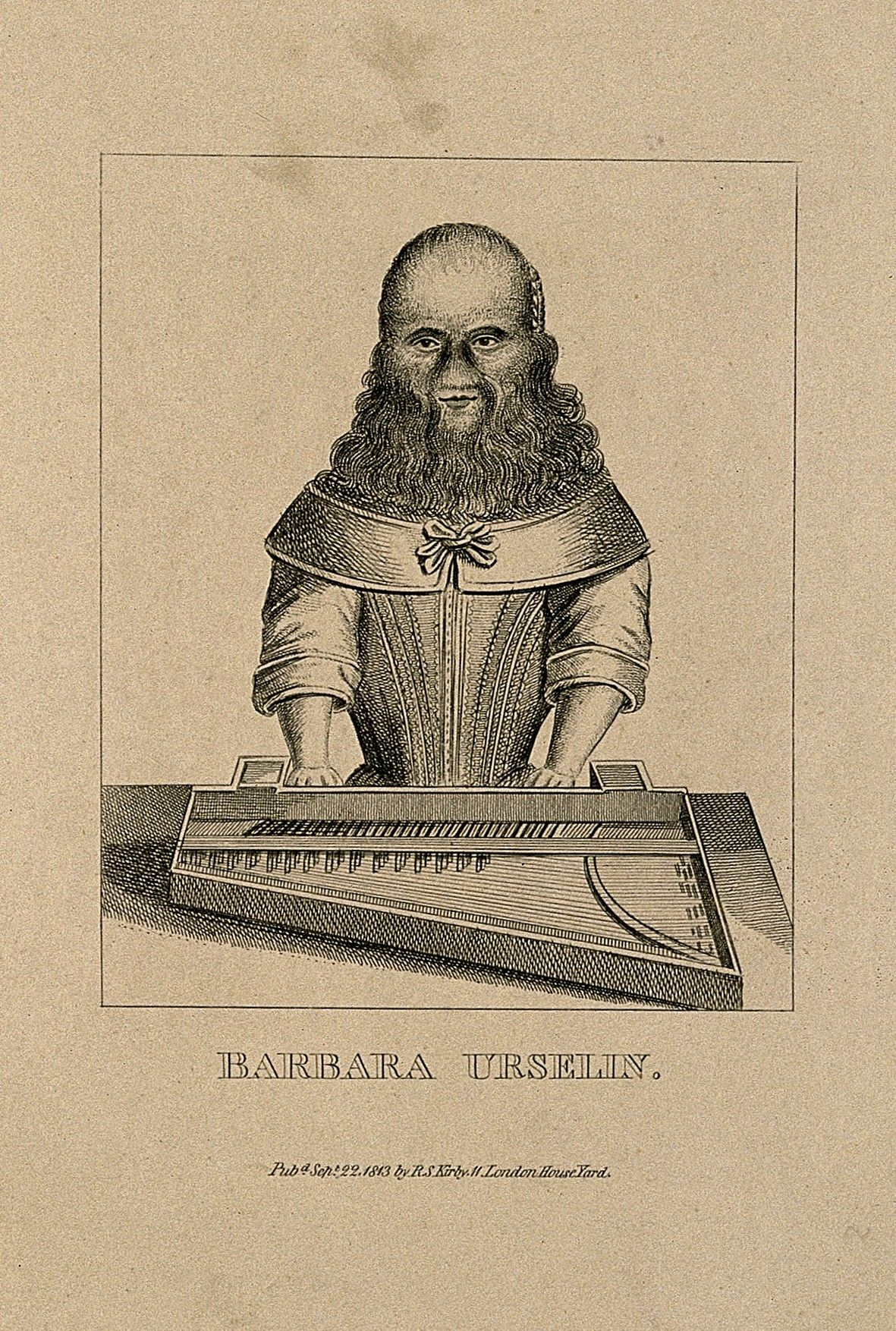
1813 etching with stipple of van Beck playing the harpsichord by R.S. Kirby

Engravings of van Beck were made by several engravers. H. Winze presented her standing, full-length in 1638. Isaac Brunnin depicted her in 1653 and Richard Gaywood showed her with her left hand on an organ with information about her birth and personal life. Engraver William Richardson created an engraving of her playing a harpsichord.

A 1640s portrait of van Beck depicts her "wearing an expensive silk gown, with a fashionable, low neckline". Historian Angela McShane observed that "this is a beautifully executed high-status painting", and highlights that depictions of van Beck differ from later Victorian images of "freaks".
