= John Fillian =

English engraver (died c. 1680)

John Fillian (fl. 1658–1680), was an engraver.

Fillian was a pupil of William Faithorne the Elder, and worked in his style, though he never attained his excellence. Evelyn, in his ‘Sculptura’ (1662), speaks of him as ‘J. Fellian, disciple of Mr. Faithorne, who is a hopeful young man.’ He died early, about 1680, before these hopes could be realised. Very few of his engravings exist, notably a portrait of Thomas Cromwell, Earl of Essex, published by P. Stent in 1658, a good work; a portrait of his master, Faithorne, from a drawing by himself; a copy of J. Payne's portrait of Paracelsus; ‘Dr. Michael,’ after Guido Reni; and the frontispiece to P. Heylyn's ‘Cosmography,’ published in 1669. Walpole was of opinion that Faithorne's engraving of ‘Christ with a Globe,’ from a picture attributed to Raphael, was completed by Fillian.
