= William Peake =

English painter and printseller

William Peake (c. 1580–1639) was an English painter and printseller.

== Life ==
He was the son of the painter Robert Peake the Elder, and father of the printseller and royalist army officer, Sir Robert Peake. In the accounts for the funeral of Henry, Prince of Wales in 1612 he is referred to as "Mr Peake, the younger Paynter", and credited with making a gilded staff for the prince's effigy.

His apprentices included the painter William Dobson and the engraver William Faithorne. No paintings are attributed to him with certainty, but the National Portrait Gallery in London has several of his engravings.
