= Baron Harington of Exton =

Title in the Peerage of England

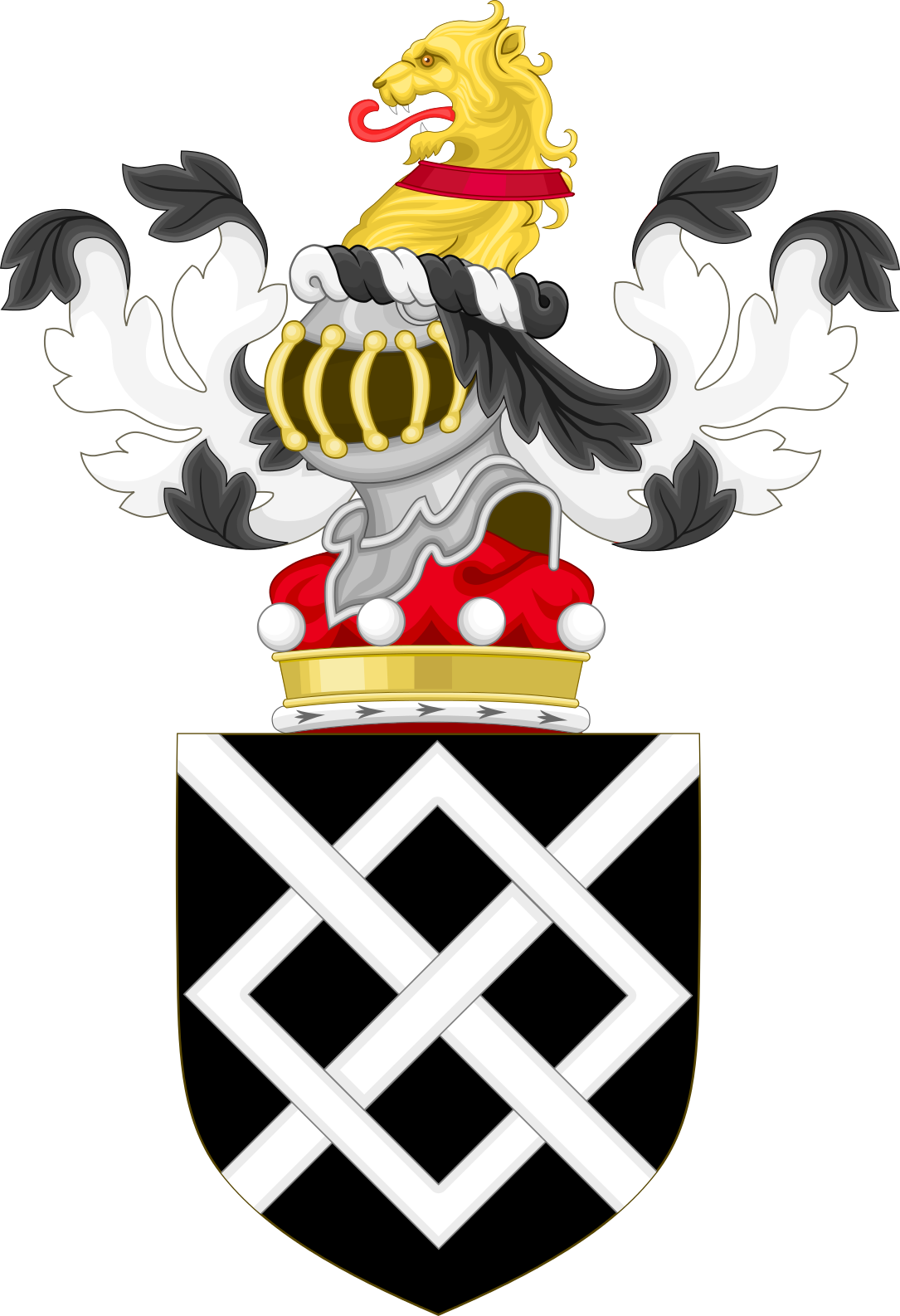
Coat of arms of Harington: Sable, a fret argent.

Baron Harington of Exton was a title in the Peerage of England, created on 21 July 1603 for John Harington (d. 1613) of Exton Hall, Rutland. It became extinct on the death of his son John Harington in 1614.

The 1st Baron was the eldest son of Sir James Harrington (c.1511–1592) of Exton. The third son of Sir James Harington was Sir James Harington, 1st Baronet.

== Barons Harington of Exton (1603) ==
- John Harington, 1st Baron Harington of Exton (d. 1613)
- John Harington, 2nd Baron Harington of Exton (1572–1614)

== See also ==
- Harington baronets
