= George Hartgill =

George Hartgill or Hartgyll (fl. 1594) was an English astronomer.

Hartgill was in considerable repute during Elizabeth I's reign, from his knowledge of the stars and his skill in astrology. He designated himself "minister of the word", and may therefore have been a Protestant preacher.

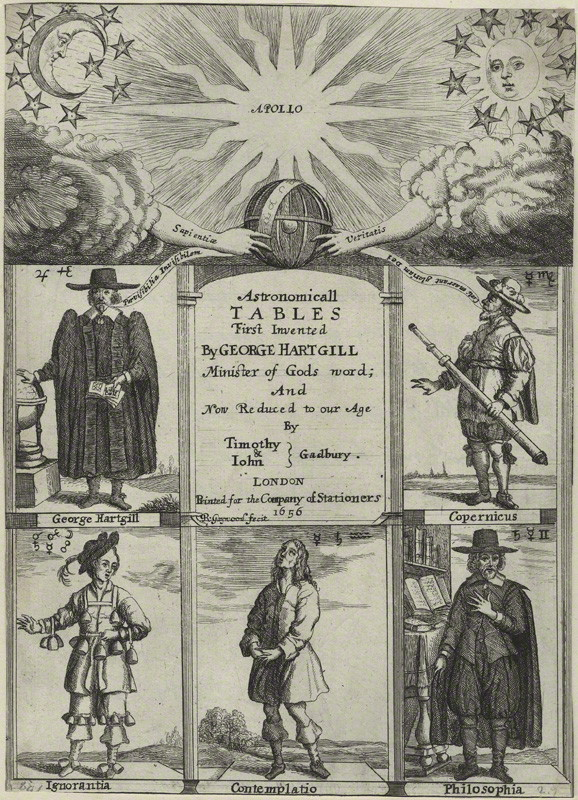
Title page from the second edition (1656) by T. & J. Gadbury of George Hartgill's astronomical work, with a portrait of the author, engraved by Richard Gaywood

Hartgill published Generall Calendars in 1594. It was dedicated to William Paulet, 1st Marquess of Winchester, and dated "from my Studie at your Lordshippe's Manor of Checkerell", i.e. Chickerell in Dorset, "the last of August 1594". A second edition was published in 1656 by T. & J. Gadbury.
