= William Faithorne the Younger =

English mezzotint engraver

William Faithorne the Younger (1656–1701) was an English mezzotint engraver.

== Life ==
He was born in London, the eldest son of William Faithorne the Elder. According to Horace Walpole he was negligent, and fell into "distresses which afflicted his father, and obliged him to work for booksellers"; but John Chaloner Smith commented that this assertion cannot be true, for his father died in 1691 and the younger man's prints reach into the reign of Queen Anne; moreover his earlier pieces are inscribed "W. Faithorne, junior". The exact year of his death is unknown; he was, it is said, buried in St. Martin's Churchyard, from the house of "Mr. Will. Copper in Half Moon Street, Covent Garden."

== Works ==
Forty-three plates are known to have been engraved by him. Among these are: Anne of Denmark, when princess; Queen Anne of England (after Michael Dahl); Charles I; Charles II (after Ehrenstrahl); John Dryden (after John Closterman); Prince Eugene, after Pfeffer; Lady Grace Gethin, after Dickson; Sir Richard Haddock, after Closterman; the Impeached Lords, four ovals, on one sheet, with titles under each: William, earl of Portland; Edward, earl of Orford; John, Lord Somers; Charles, lord Halifax; John Moore, after Kneller; Mary, princess of Orange, after Hanneman; Frederick I of Prussia; Frederick, duke of Schomberg, after Dahl; Thomas Shadwell, after Kerseboom; three portraits of William III, after Kneller; James Thynne, and Sophia Dorothea of Zelle, after Kerseboom.
