= John Harington, 2nd Baron Harington of Exton =

English peer and politician (1592–1614)

John Harington
- Baron Harington of Exton
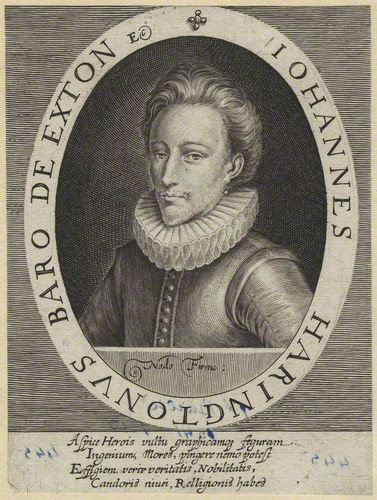
- John Harington, 1620 engraving by Magdalena and Willem de Passe
- Tenure: 1613-1614
- Born: 1592
- Died: 14 February 1614

John Harington, 2nd Baron Harington of Exton (1592 – 27 February 1614), of Burley-on-the-Hill, Rutland was a young English peer and politician. He was the Lord Lieutenant of Rutland and Baron Harington of Exton.

== Early life ==
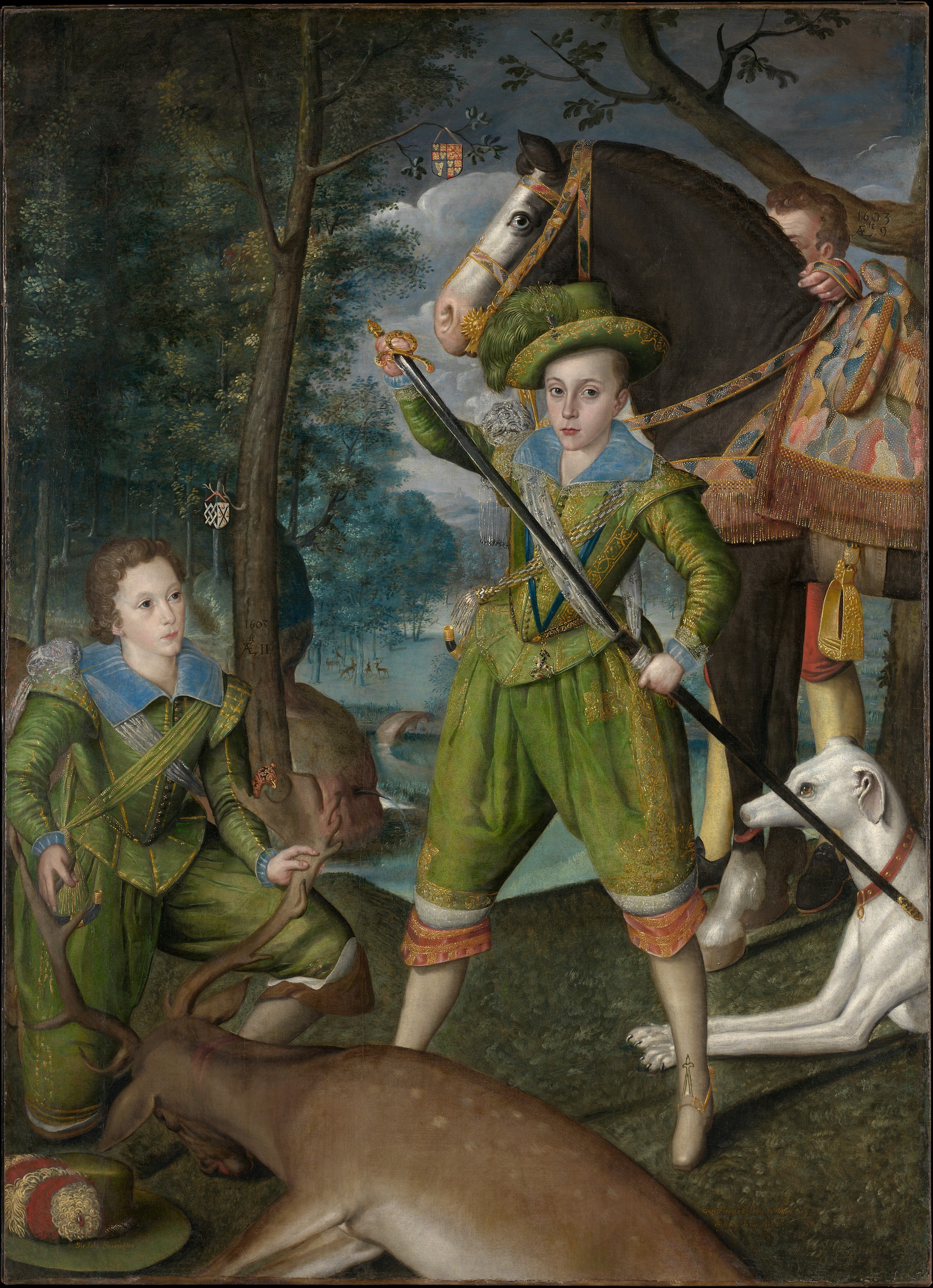
Portrait of John (left) and Henry Frederick, Prince of Wales (right) c. 1605

He was the surviving son of Sir John Harington (later created Baron Harington of Exton in 1603) and his wife, Anne Keilway, daughter of Robert Keilway, Surveyor of the Court of Wards and Liveries, and was born at Combe Abbey, near Coventry, Warwickshire, in April 1592. He was admitted in 1607 to Sidney Sussex College, Cambridge, which had been founded by Frances Sidney, his father's aunt, and to which he and his father were benefactors. He was educated with the Prince of Wales and they remained close friends until the prince's death. He succeeded his father as Baron in August 1613. The actor Kit Harington is descended from Sir John's uncle, Sir James Harington, 1st Baronet Harington of Ridlington.

== On tour ==
Friend and companion of Henry Frederick, Prince of Wales, on 5 January 1604 he was created, along with The Duke of York and others, a Knight of the Bath. In September he went a foreign tour with John Tovey, a master of the free school at Guildford. While abroad he corresponded in French and Latin with Prince Henry. After seven weeks in the Low Countries, where he visited the universities, courts of three princes, and military fortifications, Harington went to Italy in 1608.

In Venice, the English ambassador Henry Wotton introduced him to the Doge as Prince Henry's "right eye". Harington wrote from Venice (28 May 1609) announcing his intention of returning through France to spend the rest of his life with his royal friend. Henry's death (6 November 1612) greatly grieved him.

== Return to England ==
On his return to Coventry Harington became the Member of Parliament for Coventry for a brief period (1610–1611) when the incumbent John Rogerson was taken ill. He was also appointed Lord Lieutenant of Rutland in 1613 on the death of his father, a position he held until his own death the following year.

In August 1613 21-year-old Harington succeeded to his father's title and a heritage of debts, and vainly attempted to retrieve the family fortunes by obtaining a royal patent on the minting of lead farthings from the mint under a scheme proposed by Gerard de Malynes on 10 April. After the farthings proved unpopular, the young Lord Harington of Exton died at Kew on 27 February 1614 and was buried at Exton.

On 18 February he had sold the lordship of Exton to Sir Baptist Hicks, and by his will, made at the same time, left the overplus of the estates, after the creditors had been paid (according to his mother the debts amounted to £40,000), to his two sisters, two-thirds to Lucy, Countess of Bedford, and one-third to Frances, Lady Chichester (d. 1615), whose kneeling effigy exists in Pilton Church in Devon, first wife of Sir Robert Chichester (1578–1627) of Raleigh. The Countess of Bedford eventually sold the remaining family estates in Rutland.

== Reputation ==
Harington's contemporaries wrote of him in the highest terms. His funeral sermon was preached by Richard Stock, pastor of All Hallows, Bread Street, and published as "The Church's Lament for the Loss of the Godly" (London, 1614), with a small woodprint portrait. Appended to this publication were an epitaph and elegies by F. Herring and Sir Thomas Roe. At the same time a poem entitled "Sorrows Lenitive, written upon occasion of the death of that hopeful and noble young gentleman, &c.", was written by Abraham Jackson, and dedicated to Harington's mother and sister Lucy. John Donne took leave of poetry in a funeral ode on Harington (published after his death in his volume of Poems, London, 1633), and Thomas Gataker, in his "Discours Apologetical", London, 1654, p. 36, styles him a "mirror of nobility". A portrait is in Henry Holland's Herωologia.

Political offices
Preceded by The Lord Harington of Exton	Lord Lieutenant of Rutland; 1613–1614	Succeeded by The Earl of Huntingdon
Peerage of England
Preceded by John Harington	Baron Harington of Exton; 1613–1614	Extinct
