= Robert Peake (printer) =

English print-seller and royalist

Sir Robert Peake (c.1607–1667) was an English print-seller and royalist. He published a number of engravings by William Faithorne.

== Biography ==
Peake was a grandson of Robert Peake the elder.

Robert Peake published a number of engravings by William Faithorne, who, after studying for three years under John Payne, returned to work under his former master's son.

When the Civil War broke out, Peake fought on the Royalist side, defending the stronghold of Basing House from the Parliamentarian forces. Peake acted as lieutenant-governor of the Royalist forces in Basing House under the command of John Paulet, 5th Marquis of Winchester. On 28 March 1645, Peake was knighted by Charles I for his military service.

In October 1645, Basing House surrendered. The Parliamentarians sent Peake to London, confining him first in Winchester House and later at Aldersgate. He was subsequently released, but exiled from England for refusing to take the oath of allegiance to Protector Oliver Cromwell.

After the Restoration in 1660, Peake returned to England. Charles II appointed him vice-president and leader of the Honourable Artillery Company under James, Duke of York.

Peake died in 1667, aged about 75, and was buried in St Sepulchre in London. A broadside Panegyrick was published shortly after his death.
