= Thomas Cross (engraver) =

Thomas Cross, son, (fl. 1683 – 1732) was an English engraver and printmaking artist who worked extensively with music printing in the latter half of the seventeenth and the beginning of the eighteenth century. He is mainly known for his exquisite music engravings and for being the first to issue sheet music from plates. His first known work in the field of music was for Purcell's Twelve Sonatas in Three Parts (c. 1680).
