= John Harington, 1st Baron Harington of Exton =

English courtier and politician

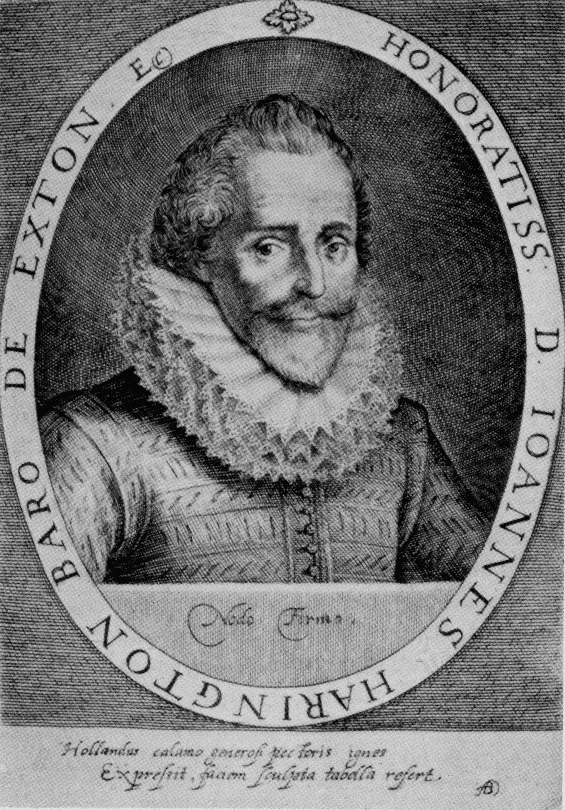
Lord Harington

Arms of Harington: Sable, a fret argent

John Harington, 1st Baron Harington (1539/40 – 23 August 1613) of Exton in Rutland, was an English courtier and politician.

== Family ==
He was the eldest son and heir of Sir James Harington (c. 1511–1592) of Exton, by his wife, Lucy Sidney (c. 1520 – c. 1591), daughter of Sir William Sidney by his wife, Anne Pagenham. His family was said to have held 'the most extensive estates in Rutland during the late sixteenth century'.

== Career ==
He entered the Inner Temple in 1558, and was elected a Member of Parliament for Rutland in 1571.

He was a Commissioner of the Peace for Kesteven from about 1559 to 1593, and was a servant to Robert Dudley, 1st Earl of Leicester in the Netherlands in 1585 and was Keeper of Kenilworth Castle, Warwickshire (1588–1590) for Ambrose Dudley, 3rd Earl of Warwick. He was appointed Sheriff of Warwickshire for 1582 and was knighted in 1584 by Sir Henry Sidney at Sir Thomas Henneage's house in London.

Harington was a Knight of the Shire (MP) for Warwickshire in 1586, when he accompanied Mary, Queen of Scots through Warwickshire on her way to Fotheringhay in Northamptonshire. He was again MP for Rutland in 1593 and 1601 and was made Deputy Lieutenant of Rutland and Warwickshire during the 1590s. He was also High Sheriff of Rutland for 1594, 1598 and 1602.

Harington was keeper of Kenilworth Castle from 1588 to 1590 for Ambrose Dudley, Earl of Warwick. His daughter Lucy married Edward Russell, the nephew of the Earl of Warwick's widow Anne Russell, Countess of Warwick.

On New Year's Day 1596 he produced a performance of Titus Andronicus and a masque written by his brother-in-law Sir Edward Wingfield at his house at Burley-on-the-Hill. A contemporary noted that he paid for the extravagant household, horses, and hunting of his daughter Lucy and the Earl of Bedford, and was forced to lease out his lands on unfavourable terms to raise money.

On 23 April 1603 he entertained King James I on his journey from Scotland at Burley House with dinner and a welcoming speech written by Samuel Daniel. James left for Burghley House followed by Harington's hounds. He returned on 25 April and fell off his horse, injuring his arm, and after staying the night left in Harington's coach.

He was created Baron Harington of Exton in July 1603 at the coronation of King James. He was made guardian of that king's daughter, Princess Elizabeth. The high cost of entertaining the Princess ruined him. As partial recompense Harington was granted a licence to mint the first copper farthings by the king.

Princess Elizabeth married Frederick V, Elector Palatine and Lord Harington accompanied her to the Electoral Palatinate. At Heidelberg two of his servants fought with Andrew Keith, a Scottish courtier who had insulted his wife.

Harington died at Worms, Germany on his way home in 1613. After his death his estate at Exton was sold to pay his creditors, being purchased by Sir Baptist Hicks.

== Family ==
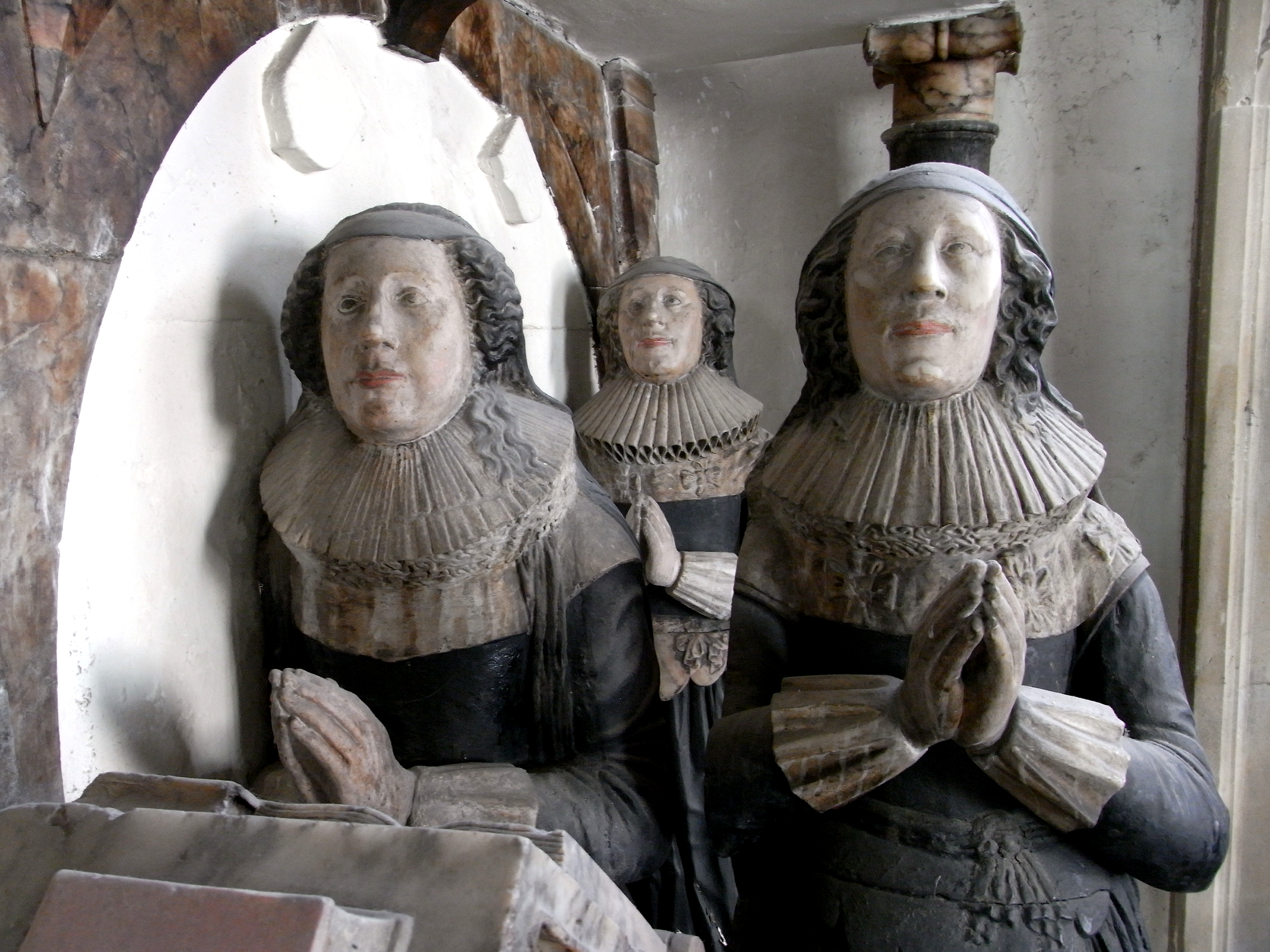
Effigies of the two wives of Sir Robert Chichester (1578–1627), in Pilton Church, Devon. His daughter kneels behind

He married Anne Keilway (d. 1620), daughter of Robert Keilway, Surveyor of the Court of Wards and Liveries. Their children included:

- John Harington, 2nd Baron Harington of Exton (1592–1614), eldest son and heir;
- Lucy Harington, wife of Edward Russell, 3rd Earl of Bedford.
- Frances Harington, Lady Chichester (1587-1615), 1st wife of Sir Robert Chichester (1578–1627), Knight, of Raleigh, in the parish of Pilton in Devon. Her kneeling effigy survives Pilton Church, with the Harington arms. She danced at court in The Masque of Beauty on 10 January 1608.

Political offices
Vacant Title last held by The Earl of Huntingdon	Lord Lieutenant of Rutland; 1607–1613	Succeeded by The Lord Harington of Exton
Peerage of England
New creation	Baron Harington of Exton; 1603–1613	Succeeded by John Harington
