= John Payne (engraver) =

17th-century English engraver

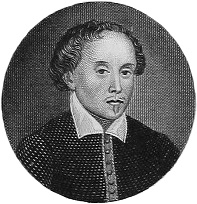
John Payne

John Payne (1607–1647) was an English engraver, who was one of the earliest exponents of the art of engraving in England. His best work was the finest produced by a native-born engraver working during the reign of Charles I.

== Biography ==
Payne appears to have learnt engraving from William and Simon de Passe, and his manner very much resembles theirs. Two of his portraits—those of Robert Devereux, 2nd Earl of Essex, and Henry de Vere, 18th Earl of Oxford—are printed in frames engraved by William de Pass, and it is an indication that early on in his career that Payne cooperated with William de Passe on some projects.

George Vertue wrote on the hearsay of John Sturt, another engraver, that Payne was a wastrel who loved drink more than work and was not reliable. For example, he alleges Payne had neglected to take up an invitation to attend the court of Charles I where he was to be offered the position of royal engraver. His irregular way of life resulted in his early death through "indigent circumstances". This must have been about 1647, as Thomas Rawlins in his Calanthe, published in 1648, has an epitaph on Payne, as "lately deceased".

== Works ==
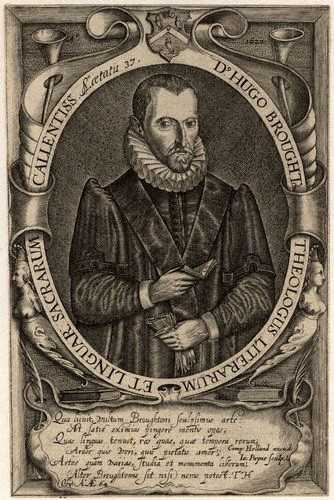
Hugh Broughton (1549–1612), an English scholar and theologian, engraved by John Payne (1620).

Payne had considerable skill in engraving, and many of his portraits and title-pages have great merit. His chief work is the large engraving, done on two plates, of the great ship Sovereign of the Seas, built by Peter Pett at Deptford in 1637. John Evelyn in his Sculptura extols this engraving, as well as Payne's portraits of Dr. Alabaster, Sir Benjamin Rudyerd, and others. Among other portraits engraved by Payne were those of Bishop Joseph Hall, Bishop Lancelot Andrewes, Sir Edward Coke, Hobson the Carrier, Sir James Ley, Christian of Brunswick, &c., and among the title-pages those to The Works of John Boys, D.D., 1629, and to Gerarde's Herball, 1633.

Antony Gerard wrote Payne's biography in the Oxford Dictionary of National Biography and stated in it that "Payne's fifty-three known plates, which bear dates between 1620 and 1639, and most of which are portrait frontispieces or title-plates to books, vary widely in quality. The worst are no better than those of many contemporaries, but the best, such as the portrait of Sir Benjamin Rudyerd of 1632, are outstanding". The National Portrait Gallery has four portraits of Payne, and attributes 55 works in their collection to him although some are "possibly by John Payne".
