= Richard Gaywood =

English engraver

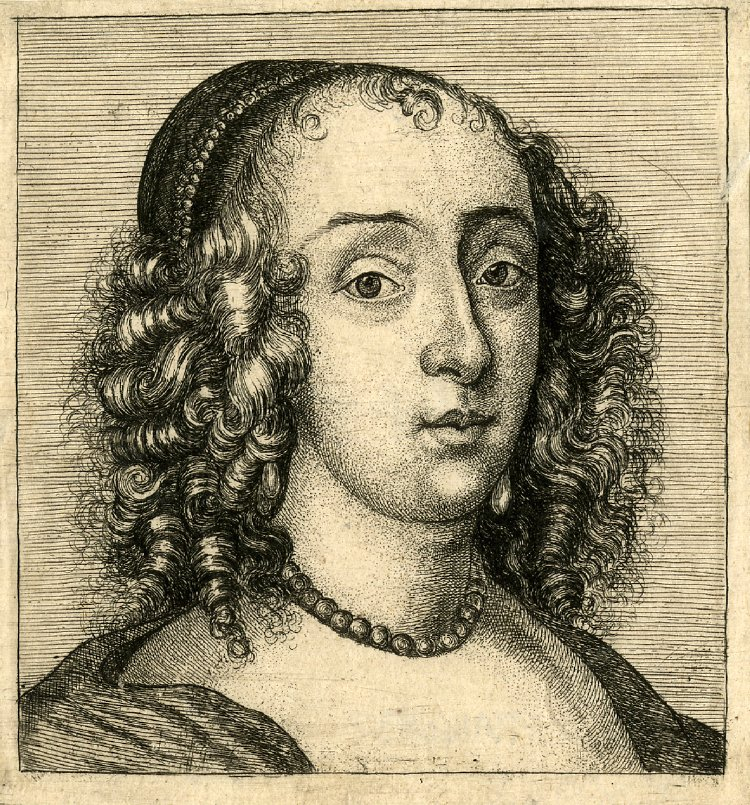
Mary Stewart, Duchess of Richmond, by Richard Gaywood

Richard Gaywood (fl. 1650–1680) was an English engraver.

== Life ==
Gaywood was a pupil of Wenceslaus Hollar, and worked in his style. A friend of Francis Barlow, he engraved many of his designs.

== Works ==
Gaywood was prolific, the bulk of his work consisting of portraits and frontispieces to books, for which he was widely employed by publishers. Much of his work was for Peter Stent.

Gaywood is noted for his etchings of birds and animals after Francis Barlow. They worked together on a large etching after Titian's Venus and the Organist, which was dedicated to John Evelyn.

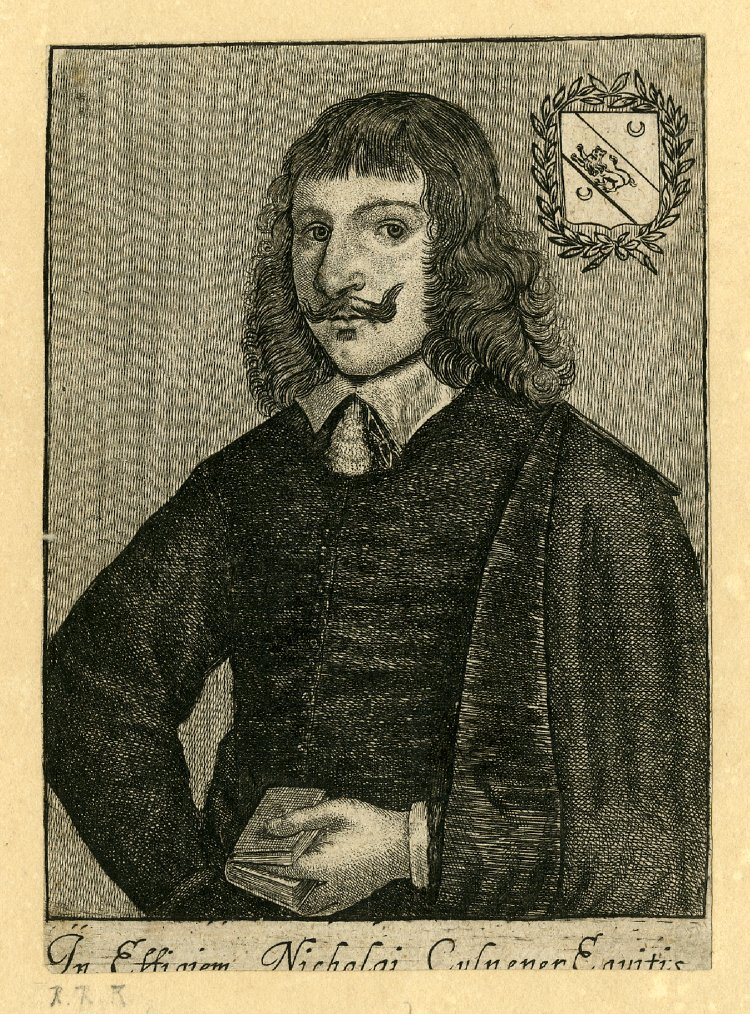
Portrait of Nicholas Culpeper.

Gaywood's portraits include copies from engravings by Hollar, and those in the Centum Icones of Anthony van Dyck. Others were those of: William Drummond of Hawthornden, and the early kings of Scotland in his History of Scotland, 1655; Oliver Cromwell; James Shirley; Sir Peter and Lady Ellinor Temple; George Monck, Duke of Albemarle (after Barlow); Madame Anne Kirk; General William Fairfax; Sir Bulstrode Whitelocke; and John Browne the instrument maker.

Among the frontispieces and title-pages was that to Johann Jacob Wecker's Secrets of Art and Nature (1660). Other plates were a set of social scenes, representing the Five Senses, a view of Stonehenge, The most magnificent Riding of Charles the II to the Parliament, 1661, The Egg of Dutch Rebellion (satirical print, 1673), Capture of a Whale at Sea, Democritus, and Heraclitus.

== Notes ==
Attribution

This article incorporates text from a publication now in the public domain: "Gaywood, Richard". Dictionary of National Biography. London: Smith, Elder & Co. 1885–1900.
