= William Faithorne =

English artist and engraver (1616–1691)

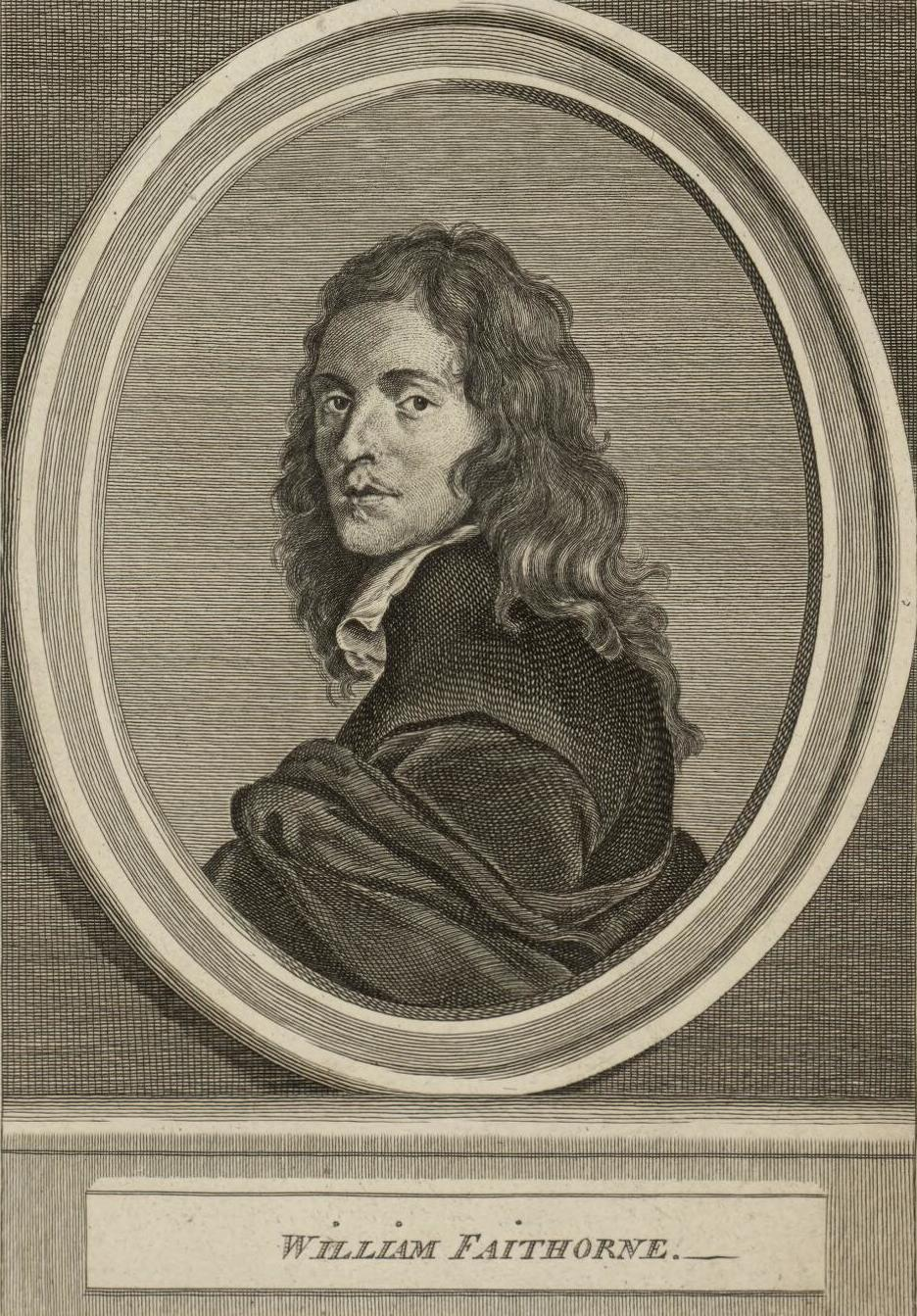
engraving of William Faithorne by Alexander Bannermann, c. 1760

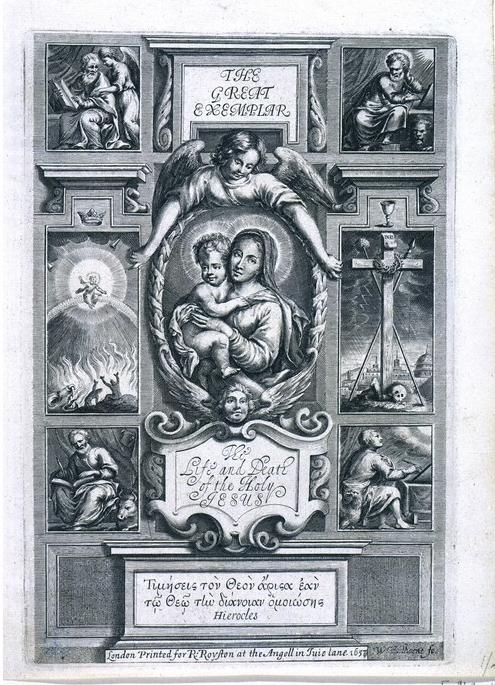
Frontispiece, 1657, William Faithorne Victoria and Albert Museum no. E.949-1960

William Faithorne, often "the Elder" (1616 – 13 May 1691), was an English painter and engraver.

== Life ==
Faithorne was born in London and was apprenticed to William Peake. On the outbreak of the Civil War Faithorne accompanied his master into the king's service, and being made prisoner at Basing House, he was confined for some time to Aldersgate, where, however, he was permitted to follow his profession of engraver, and among other portraits did a small one of George Villiers, 1st Duke of Buckingham.

At the earnest solicitation of his friends Faithorne very soon regained his liberty, but only on condition of retiring to France, where he received instruction from Robert Nanteuil. He was permitted to return to England in about 1650, and took a shop near Temple Bar, where, besides his work as an engraver, he carried on a large business as a print-seller.

In 1680 Faithorne gave up his shop and retired to a house in Blackfriars, occupying himself chiefly in painting portraits from the life in crayons, although still occasionally engaged in engraving. It is said that his life was shortened by the misfortunes and dissipation of his son William. He was buried in the church of St Ann Blackfriars on 13 May 1691.

== Work ==
Faithorne is especially noted as a portrait engraver, his subjects including Sir Henry Spelman, Oliver Cromwell, Henry Somerset, Marquis of Worcester, John Milton, Queen Catherine, Prince Rupert of the Rhine, Cardinal Richelieu, Sir Thomas Fairfax, Thomas Hobbes, Richard Hooker, Robert Devereux, 2nd Earl of Essex, and Charles I. According to the Encyclopædia Britannica Eleventh Edition, his engravings were "remarkable for their combination of freedom and strength with softness and delicacy", adding that "his crayon paintings unite to these the additional quality of clear and brilliant colouring".

In 1658 Faithorne engraved a large map of London which had been drawn by the Somerset landowner Richard Newcourt. Printed on four sheets, it provides important evidence for the geography of the city before the Great Fire. In 1662 he issued a translation of Abraham Bosse's treatise, under the title of The art of graveing and etching, wherein is exprest the true way of graveing in copper. Also the manner and method of ... Callot and Mr. Bosse in their severall ways of etching.

== Family ==
Faithorne's son, William Faithorne the younger (1667–1703), was a promising mezzotint engraver, but became idle and dissipated, and involved his father in financial difficulties. (Note: The best account of the Faithornes is that contained in Walpole's Anecdotes of Painting. A life of Faithorne the elder is preserved in the British Museum among the papers of John Bagford, librarian to Robert, Earl of Oxford and Earl Mortimer, and an intimate friend of Faithorne (Chisholm 1911).)
