= Northamptonshire Trained Bands =

Auxiliary military force

- Active: 1558–1662
- Country: Kingdom of England
- Branch: Trained Bands
- Role: Infantry and Cavalry
- Size: 4 Companies of Foot, 1 Troop of Horse
- Garrison/HQ: Northampton
- Engagements: First Bishops' War; Second Bishops' War; Battle of Worcester

The Northamptonshire Trained Bands were a part-time auxiliary military force in the county of Northamptonshire in the East Midlands of England from 1558 until they were reconstituted as the Northamptonshire Militia in 1662. They were periodically embodied for home defence, for example during the Armada Campaign of 1588. They served in the Bishops' Wars and at the Battle of Worcester. They were also employed to support the Commonwealth and Protectorate regimes during the 1650s.

== Origin ==
The English militia was descended from the Anglo-Saxon Fyrd, the military force raised from the freemen of the shires under command of their Sheriff. It continued under the Norman kings, and was reorganised under the Assizes of Arms of 1181 and 1252, and again by King Edward I's Statute of Winchester of 1285.

== Northamptonshire Trained Bands ==
The legal basis of the militia was updated by two Acts of 1557 covering musters and the maintenance of horses and armour by landowners and parishes. The county militia was now under the Lord Lieutenant, assisted by the Deputy Lieutenants and Justices of the Peace (JPs). The entry into force of these Acts in 1558 is seen as the starting date for the organised county militia in England. Although the militia obligation was universal, the disorderly force assembled against the Rising of the North in 1569 confirmed that it was impractical to train and equip every able-bodied man, so after 1572 the practice was to select a proportion of men for the Trained Bands (TBs). They were trained by professional captains and muster-masters for up to 10 days each year. Full musters were held about every three years when the arms and armour were inspected. Between training and musters the arms and armour were stored by the parishes or with armourers; in Northamptonshire the gunpowder and slow match for the musketeers were kept in Northampton and the other major towns: Brackley, Daventry, Kettering, Oundle, Peterborough,Towcester and Wellingborough.

=== Armada crisis ===
The threat of invasion during the Spanish War led to an increase in training. At first the government emphasised the 17 'maritime' counties most vulnerable to attack, and it was not until 1586 that the inland counties were placed under lords-lieutenant, ordered to appoint captains and muster-master corporals, and to intensify training. Sir Christopher Hatton was appointed Lord Lieutenant of Northamptonshire on 12 September 1586. Hatton organised the hundreds of the county into two 'Divisions', Eastern and Western, and placed them under his deputies, Sir Edward Montagu (Eastern) and Sir Richard Knightley (Western). Each division had a mounted troop of roughly 10 demi-lancers and 40 light horse, and two foot companies each nominally 150 strong. Between 1 and 5 November musters were carried out at Northampton, Culworth, Daventry and Towcester, but the county only had 88 calivers (firearms) and 201 corslets (pikemen's armour). The foot were given a few more days' training in February and in October 1587, when the two troops of horse were also mustered at Northampton and Kettering.

With the Spanish Armada preparing to invade England, the TBs were placed on alert in April 1588, when Northamptonshire reported that it had 600 trained and 640 untrained foot, 20 lancers and 80 light horsemen. Of the untrained men, Northamptonshire organised 80 as pioneers, and it was suggested that 200 more armed with the traditional English longbow would constitute a reserve left in the county when the TBs marched out. The TBs were brought to an hour's notice in June, and they were mobilised on 23 July when warning of the invasion Armada arrived. Hatton was with the Royal court at Richmond, so he ordered Knightley and Montagu to muster, equip, pay and clothe the men. The companies then carried out five days' intensive training. When it marched out the Northamptonshire contingent was organised as follows:

- Horse
  - Captain William Lane: 40 lancers and 32 light horse
- Western Division Foot
  - Captain Thomas Burnaby – 143 foot recruited from Fawsley, Warden, Guilsborough, Nobottle and Spelhoe hundreds and mustered at Daventry
  - Captain Roger Knowles, 144 foot from Towcester, Sutton, Norton, Cleley and Wymersley hundreds and the borough of Northampton
- Eastern Division Foot
  - Captain Francis Nicolls, 142 foot from Higham Ferrers, Huxloe, Rothwell, Hamfordshoe and Orlingbury hundreds, mustered at Wellingborough
  - Captain William Browne, 98 foot from Polebrook, Willibrook, Navisford and Corby hundreds, mustered at Oundle, and 47 from the Soke of Peterborough

Of the foot, 300 were equipped with firearms, probably 240 calivers and 60 muskets, the remainder with pikes. Each Northamptonshire company used three carts to carry their heavy weapons and armour to increase the speed of marching. The foot were paid 10 shillings 'conduct money' for their march to London, but the Eastern Division companies, setting out from Northampton on 31 July, two days later than the Western Division from Towcester, were paid a bonus of a shilling per man to force-march and catch up. Knightley acted as conducting officer for the march.

On 1 August the two troops of horse under William Lane joined the Earl of Leicester's army assembled at Tilbury in Essex. The following day the four foot bands, after their rapid march, arrived at Islington to join Lord Hunsdon's army concentrating around London to defend Queen Elizabeth I. Knightley handed them over to Hunsdon's officers and returned home. The Northamptonshire Foot came under Royal pay on 2 August. They were planned to be joined with 1000 men from the Middlesex TBs to form a regiment under the command of Colonel Sir William Knollys, though Hunsdon's army was never fully formed. The Queen rode out from London to join Leicester's army, where she gave her famous Speech to the Troops at Tilbury on 9 August. However, the Armada had already been defeated at sea, and the army was stood down shortly afterwards. The Northampton Foot left on 15 August and were paid for their march home as far as Peterborough. The horse left Tilbury on 19 August. Lord Hunsdon warned the deputy lieutenants to keep the men and their arms in readiness in case they had to be recalled, but this proved unnecessary as the Armada had been completely dispersed.

In 1589 Montagu mustered the TBs again (Knightley being involved in the Marprelate Controversy), finding that he had 400 of the trained men from 1588, and filled the ranks with 200 fresh men. Musters were also held in 1591 and 1595 (when the muster-master was Capt Parr Lane, commander of one of the Northamptonshire troops of horse), but with the passing of the threat of invasion, the trained bands had begun to decline.

In the 16th Century little distinction was made between the militia and the troops levied by the counties for overseas expeditions, and between 1585 and 1601 Northamptonshire supplied 1059 levies for service in Ireland, 450 for France and 600 for the Netherlands. However, the counties usually conscripted the unemployed and criminals rather than the trained bandsmen – in 1585 the Privy Council had ordered the impressment of able-bodied unemployed men, and the Queen ordered 'none of her trayned-bands to be pressed'. Captain Parr Lane himself commanded a company of such men levied in Northamptonshire for service in Ireland. Replacing the weapons issued to the levies from the militia armouries was a heavy burden on the counties.

=== Stuart TBs ===
The trained bands continued to decline under King James I. In 1605 the Earl of Exeter, lord lieutenant from 1603, was ordered to make good any deficiencies in the Northampton TBs since regular musters had been discontinued. The county's arms and armour were concentrated at Northampton and Fotheringhay Castles, that at Fotheringhay later being moved to the royal manor of Collyweston, where the powder for the western division of the county was later stored. Training was sporadic. Captain Fisher, a professional muster-master from outside the county, superintended the training in 1609, 1612 and 1613. In 1613, Sir Richard Knightley was again in overall charge of the Western Division, but was most concerned with the trained men of four hundreds, while Sir William Tate took charge of the other six hundreds of the division. That year's training seems to have been reasonably thorough, yet by then Northamptonshire had only 142 calivers, 34 muskets and 164 corslets, about half its requirements for the number of 'trained' men, and many of the firearms were reported as defective, battered or lost, due to careless storage and general peacetime slackness. Training was taken less seriously in 1614, despite the news of renewed hostilities in the Netherlands. In October 1620 the landholders were ordered to send to Northampton those horses and armour with which they were charged, so that the TBs could be mustered at the Market Cross.

King Charles I who ascended the throne in 1625 attempted to reform the moribund trained bands into a national force or 'Perfect Militia' answering to the monarch rather than local control. Training and procurement of arms was increased, and the TB mechanism was used once again to raise levies for the disastrous expeditions of the Anglo-French War (1627–1629).

By 1638 the Northamptonshire TBs mustered 284 musketeers and 295 'corslets' (pikemen), 58 cuirassiers and 50 light horse.

=== Bishops' Wars ===
In 1639 and 1640 Charles attempted to employ the TBs for the Bishops' Wars in Scotland. However, many of those sent on this unpopular service were untrained replacements and conscripts, and many officers were corrupt or inefficient. Conscription became a cause célèbre in Northamptonshire when the deputy lieutenants 'pressed' (conscripted) the parish constable of Burton Latimer, George Plowright. Plowright claimed that this 'malicious impressment' was at the instigation of Thomas Bacon with whom he was in a legal dispute. Sir Rowland St John and the other deputy lieutenants countered that Plowright had failed to provide suitable pressed men from the village and they had pressed other constables who had failed in their duty. They gave him leave to find a substitute, but the first men he presented were rejected by Sir Lewis Watson, who was about to conduct the Northamptonshire contingent to the rendezvous at Selby in Yorkshire. It seems that Plowright followed the march part-way to Selby to ensure that Watson accepted his final substitute. The Privy Council committed Plowright to prison for a short period. Ironically, many of the Northamptonshire men, including those from Burton Latimer, deserted before they reached Selby. The campaign was a failure.

For the Second Bishops' War of 1640 Northamptonshire was ordered to select 550 men and march them to Newcastle upon Tyne. In the Eastern Division many trained bandsmen were willing to accept the king's 'prest' money and march, and the inhabitants were willing to pay the 'coat and conduct money' for them. However, in the Western Division the TBs unanimously refused to serve. It appears that raw substitutes had to be sent in their place. This campaign also ended in failure.

=== Civil Wars ===
Control of the TBs was one of the major points of dispute between Charles I and Parliament that led to the First English Civil War. When open warfare broke out in 1642 neither side made much use of the TBs beyond securing the county armouries for their own full-time troops who would serve anywhere in the country, many of whom were former trained bandsmen, or using the TBs as auxiliary units for garrisons.

Once Parliament had re-established full control it passed new Militia Acts in 1648 and 1650 that replaced lords lieutenant with county commissioners appointed by Parliament or the Council of State. At the same time the term 'Trained Band' began to disappear. In August 1651 the Northamptonshire TBs were ordered to join the militia rendezvous at Northampton. They then marched to join Cromwell's army at the Battle of Worcester.

Under the Commonwealth and Protectorate the militia received pay when called out, and operated alongside the New Model Army to control the country. During the Rule of the Major-Generals, a Select Militia of horse was organised for this role, with the men training more frequently and serving for longer periods than the traditional trained bands. Northamptonshire was under the command of Major-General William Boteler, who was uncompromising in his pursuit of Royalists and religious dissidents in the county.

== Restoration Militia ==
After the Restoration of the Monarchy the English Militia was re-established by the Militia Act 1661 under the control of the king's lords lieutenants. This was popularly seen as the 'Constitutional Force' to counterbalance a 'Standing Army' tainted by association with the New Model Army that had supported Cromwell's military dictatorship, and almost the whole burden of home defence and internal security was entrusted to the militia. Their early duties included seizing arms from dissidents, demolishing fortifications, suppressing non-conformist religious assemblies and mounting standing guards in towns.

== Uniforms ==
Sir Christopher Hatton ordered the Northamptonshire Trained Band foot sent to London during the Armada crisis of 1588 to be issued with uniform coats (in the two Troops of horse only the cornets (standard-bearers) wore uniforms). Unfortunately the colour was left to the discretion of the deputy lieutenants and we do not know what they chose. However, the Northamptonshire levies sent to Chester in 1596 for the Irish War were clad in warmly lined blue coats.

== See also ==
- Trained bands
- Northamptonshire Militia
- Rutlandshire Trained Bands
