= Northampton Militia =

Auxiliary force of the British Army

The Northamptonshire Militia (Note: There is no consistency in the sources as to whether the regiment was the 'Northampton' or 'Northamptonshire' Militia, both forms being used indiscriminately, together with the abbreviation 'Northants' Militia.) was an auxiliary military force in the county of Northamptonshire in the English Midlands. From their formal organisation as Trained Bands in 1572, the Militia units of Northamptonshire provided internal security and home defence during times of international tension and major wars, relieving regular troops from routine garrison duties and acting as a source of trained officers and men for the Regular Army. The Northamptonshire Militia also served overseas at various times in Ireland and Gibraltar. In 1860 it amalgamated with the neighbouring Rutland Militia to form a new regiment.

== Early History ==
The English militia was descended from the Anglo-Saxon Fyrd, the military force raised from the freemen of the shires under command of their Sheriff. It continued under the Norman kings as the posse comitatus, notably at the Battle of the Standard (1138). The force was reorganised under the Assizes of Arms of 1181 and 1252, and again by King Edward I's Statute of Winchester of 1285.

Under this statute 'Commissioners of Array' would levy the required number of men from each shire. The usual shire contingent was 1000 infantry commanded by a millenar, divided into companies of 100 commanded by centenars or constables, and subdivided into platoons of 20 led by vintenars. (John E. Morris, the historian of Edward's Welsh Wars writing in 1901, likened this process to calling out the militia battalion of the county regiment.) King Edward I made use of this mechanism in his Welsh and Scottish campaigns. As an inland county Northamptonshire avoided most of these demands, but King Edward II called the first national levy in July 1322 for his Scottish campaign. The Northampton county contingent was 440 strong at the rendezvous at Newcastle upon Tyne, dwindling to 247 when it reached Leith a few weeks later; Northampton town had been assessed to supply 40 of these men. Thereafter Northamptonshire provided soldiers for all six national levies between 1322 and 1338 for service in Scotland or Flanders. Soldiers raised for the overseas campaigns of the Hundred Years War were not county conscripts but volunteers paid under contract, while the forces raised during civil conflicts such as the Wars of the Roses were mainly retainers of the great magnates.

Threatened with invasion in 1539 King Henry VIII called a great muster of all able-bodied men by county and hundred, and on 31 April Northamptonshire reported as follows:

- Fawsley Hundred: 325 men
- Nobottle Hundred: 170 men
- Norton Warden and King's Sutton Hundreds: 200 archers, 300 billmen, 100 'harnesses' (armour)
- Corby Hundred: 754 men
- Willybrook Hundred: 253 men
- Spelhoe Hundred: 27 archers, 64 billmen, 23 harnesses
- Wymersley Hundred: 59 archers, 77 billmen, 44 harnesses
- Guilsborough Hundred: 269 archers, 93 billmen, 176 harnesses
- Rothwell Hundred: 107 archers, 26 billmen, 81 harnesses
- Higham Ferrers Hundreds: 94 men
- Hawfordes How Hundred: 78 men
- Huxloe Hundred: 161 men
- Orlingbury Hundred: 68 men
- Polebrook and Navisford Hundred: 158 men
- Nassaburgh Hundred (the Soke of Peterborough): 244 men

== Trained Bands ==
The legal basis of the militia was updated by two Acts of 1557 covering musters and the maintenance of horses and armour. The county militia was now under the Lord Lieutenant, assisted by the Deputy Lieutenants and Justices of the Peace (JPs). The entry into force of these Acts in 1558 is seen as the starting date for the organised county militia in England. Although the militia obligation was universal, the disorderly force assembled against the Rising of the North in 1569 confirmed that it was impractical to train and equip every able-bodied man, so after 1572 the practice was to select a proportion of men for the Trained Bands (TBs).

The threat of invasion during the Spanish War led to an increase in training and in 1586 the inland counties were placed under lords-lieutenant (Sir Christopher Hatton for Northamptonshire), ordered to appoint captains and muster-masters. The TBs were placed on alert in April 1588, when Northamptonshire reported that it had 600 trained and 640 untrained foot, 20 lancers and 80 light horsemen, and 80 pioneers. The TBs were mobilised on 23 July when warning of the invasion Armada arrived. The Northamptonshire contingent of 4 companies of foot and 2 troops of horse joined the Queen's armies mustering at Islington and Tilbury, where they remained until the Armada had been defeated.

In the 16th Century little distinction was made between the militia and the troops levied by the counties for overseas expeditions, and between 1585 and 1601 Northamptonshire supplied 1059 levies for service in Ireland, 450 for France and 600 for the Netherlands. However, the counties usually conscripted the unemployed and criminals rather than the Trained Bandsmen – in 1585 the Privy Council had ordered the impressment of able-bodied unemployed men, and the Queen ordered 'none of her trayned-bands to be pressed'. Replacing the weapons issued to the levies from the militia armouries was a heavy burden on the counties.

With the passing of the threat of invasion, the trained bands declined in the early 17th century. Later, Charles I attempted to reform them into a national force or 'Perfect Militia', answering to the king rather than local control. In 1639 and 1640, Charles tried to employ the TBs for the Bishops' Wars in Scotland. However, many of those sent on this unpopular service were untrained replacements and conscripts, and many officers were corrupt or inefficient.

Control of the TBs was one of the major points of dispute between Charles I and Parliament that led to the First English Civil War. When open warfare broke out, neither side made much use of the TBs beyond securing the county armouries for their own full-time troops who would serve anywhere in the country, many of whom were former trained bandsmen, or using the TBs as auxiliary units for garrisons.

As Parliament tightened its grip on the country after the Second English Civil War, it passed new Militia Acts in 1648 and 1650 that replaced lords lieutenant with county commissioners appointed by Parliament or the Council of State. From now on, the term 'Trained Band' began to disappear in most counties. Under the Commonwealth and Protectorate, the militia received pay when called out, and operated alongside the New Model Army to control the country. Many militia regiments were called out in 1651 during the Scottish invasion in which the Northamptonshires were part of a militia rendezvous at Northampton and then joined Cromwell's army at the Battle of Worcester.

== Restoration Militia ==
After the Restoration of the Monarchy the English Militia was re-established by the Militia Act 1661 under the control of the king's lords lieutenants, the men to be selected by ballot. This was popularly seen as the 'Constitutional Force' to counterbalance a 'Standing Army' tainted by association with the New Model Army that had supported Cromwell's military dictatorship, and almost the whole burden of home defence and internal security was entrusted to the militia. Their early duties included seizing arms from dissidents, suppressing non-conformist religious assemblies and mounting standing guards in towns.

As before, communities and wealthier individuals were assessed to pay for the arms and training of varying numbers of militiamen. In Northamptonshire the deputy lieutenants complained at the slowness of the settlement and there were objections to the inequitable nature of some assessments. In this county the foot were mainly supplied by the townships, their contributions being generally small. In Nobottle Hundred in 1663, 13 towns contributed 24 musketeers and 10 pikemen, five clergymen supplied four musketeers, and three individuals were charged with two musketeers.

The restored monarchy was anxious to cut off any means for the disaffected to revolt in future, and in 1662 ordered the destruction of fortifications where there was no permanent garrison. This included the town walls of Northampton. The joint lords lieutenant of Northamptonshire, the Earls of Westmorland and Exeter, were ordered to enter the town with the trained bands and see that the work was carried out. The deputy lieutenants gathered as many militiamen as they could while the harvest was in progress and occupied the town on 9 July. They found 200 muskets stored in the town hall and more in the vestry of the great church, and they put these under guard. The two earls entered the town next day and summoned the mayor and other dignitaries to receive the government's orders. Demolition cost almost £136 (the government had only allowed £50), but was carried out without any trouble.

When the Royal Navy lost the Four Days' Battle in June 1666 during the Second Anglo-Dutch War, the militia were mobilised to face a possible invasion. The Northamptonshires were called out, and Northampton was nominated as one of the towns where the militia horse of the inland counties were collected as a strategic reserve. However, the navy regained supremacy with the St. James's Day Battle on 25 July, and the militia were dispersed on 6 August.

Under James II the militia of South West England served during the Monmouth Rebellion of 1685, but thereafter the king diverted militia money to his growing Regular Army. The militia resumed their role during his successor, William III, and the Northamptonshires were embodied during an invasion scare in 1690. The militia were mustered for annual training until the Treaty of Utrecht and the accession of King George I. After that they passed into virtual abeyance, though the Northamptonshires were called out in October 1715 during the Jacobite rising. The Lord Lieutenant, John Montagu, 2nd Duke of Montagu, commanded the Foot regiment himself, with Sir John Humble as major. The county's militia were also raised during the Jacobite rising of 1745 (which invaded England as far as Derbyshire).

== 1757 Reforms ==
Under threat of French invasion during the Seven Years' War a series of Militia Acts from 1757 reorganised the county militia regiments, the men being conscripted by means of parish ballots (paid substitutes were permitted) to serve for three years. In peacetime they assembled for 28 days' annual training. There was a property qualification for officers, who were commissioned by the lord lieutenant. An adjutant and drill sergeants were to be provided to each regiment from the Regular Army, and arms and accoutrements would be supplied when the county had secured 60 per cent of its quota of recruits.

Northamptonshire was assessed to raise 640 men in one regiment, but conscription by ballot was deeply unpopular in the Midland country districts – there were anti-ballot riots in Northampton town – and the necessity for the force did not seem so urgent for inland counties far from any potential invasion. Although the deputy lieutenants held their meeting at the George Inn in Northampton, not enough gentlemen came forward to be commissioned as officers. Whereas most English counties reformed their militia in 1759–60, the apathetic Midland gentry preferred to pay large county fines instead of raising their regiments. In the event it was not until March 1763 – after the Treaty of Paris had ended the war – that another meeting was held at the George Inn for the officers to receive their commissions. Henry Yelverton, 3rd Earl of Sussex was appointed colonel of the regiment with Lord St John as his lieutenant-colonel, and officers were appointed to form 10 companies of 60 men each. Most of the other ranks (ORs) enrolled were paid substitutes, rather than the balloted men. The Northamptonshire Militia was ready to be issued with its arms on 14 April 1763. Thereafter the reformed regiment continued its 28 days' training each year, usually at Northampton in May and June, though in 1771 it trained in separate detachments at Wellingborough and Kettering because of a smallpox outbreak at Northampton. It became customary for the regiment to parade in Northampton's Market Square on 4 June to celebrate King George III's birthday and fire a salute of three volleys of blanks.

=== American War of Independence ===
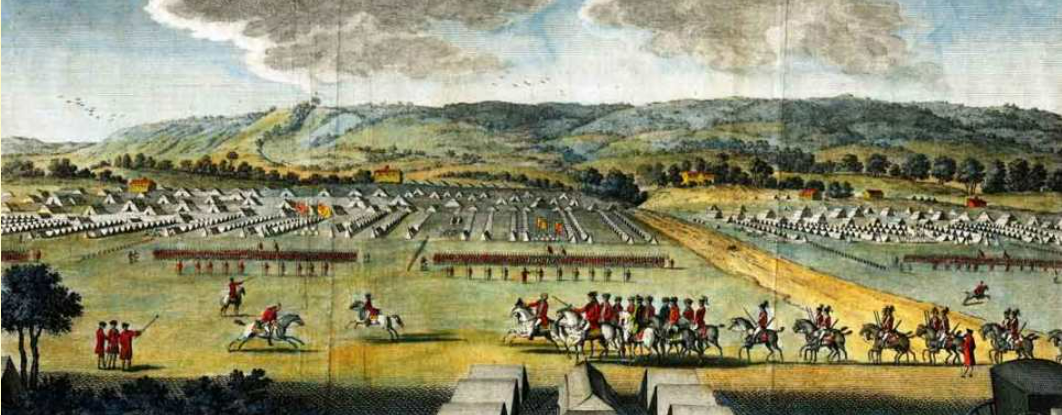
Coxheath Camp in 1778.

The militia was called out after the outbreak of the War of American Independence when the country was threatened with invasion by the Americans' allies, France and Spain. The reformed Northamptonshire Militia was assembled for 'permanent duty' for the first time in April 1778. It became normal policy to gather the militia regiments into encampments during the summer months where they could be exercised in larger formations alongside Regular troops, and on 11 and 12 June 1778 the Northamptonshires marched to Warley Camp in Essex, before going into winter quarters around Cheshunt in November.

In 1779 the militia were authorised to augment their strength by recruiting companies through voluntary enlistment; the establishment of the Northamptons was increased to 12 companies. In June the regiment marched to Coxheath Camp near Maidstone in Kent, which was the army's largest training camp, where the militia were exercised as part of a division alongside regular troops while providing a reserve in case of French invasion of South East England. The regiment spent the whole summer there, being joined by its recruits from Northampton. It left Coxheath on 26 November and marched to Aylesbury and Buckingham for the winter, its route taking it through London.

In May 1780 the regiment was ordered back to Kent for its summer camp at Dartford. Marching in two 'divisions', its route took it through Uxbridge to quarters at Lambeth, Vauxhall and Newington just south of London, to arrive on 7 and 9 June. However, the Gordon Riots had broken out in London, and on 7 June the first division was ordered to remain at Lambeth to protect Lambeth Palace; the second division was diverted to quarters in Hammersmith, Fulham and Putney, west of the city. A large number of militia units guarded vital points around London while the riots were suppressed. The Northamptonshires remained around Vauxhall until 3 July when they moved to quarters around Blackheath and Greenwich and attended to cleaning and mending uniforms, while the volunteer company joined. Finally, orders arrived to continue the march to Dartford Camp on 14 July. The six regiments in camp carried out a practice crossing of the Thames by boats from Gravesend to the Essex shore on 20 July, returning the following day. The Right Column for this operation was composed of the Northamptonshire Militia and the 52nd Foot. Later in the summer a large fire broke out in the huts of the 52nd, and the Northamptonshires were commended for their assistance in firefighting. On 30 September the regiment's recruits were ordered to march from Northampton to join the regiment at Dartford. But on 17 October, after several months under canvas, the regiment was ordered back to winter quarters in its home county, at Northampton (8 companies), Wellingborough (3) and Kettering (2). In February 1781 the companies at Northampton were temporarily evacuated to Daventry (5 companies) and Wellingborough (3) while the Assizes were held in the county town.

In May 1781 the regiment was ordered to march by stages back to Kent to camp at Lenham Heath near Maidstone, arriving on 11 June. On 3 November it was ordered into winter quarters at Maidstone and neighbouring villages (the companies in Maidstone moving out for the Assizes in March 1782). Some of the men had been granted leave, but in January 1782 reward notices were posted for the apprehension of 21 men (18 substitutes and 3 balloted men) who had not returned on time and were posted as deserters. On 4 February 1782 the newly balloted men or their substitutes were marched from Northampton to join the regiment at Maidstone. Then the regiment marched in divisions by stages to Winchester Barracks, arriving between 30 April and 3 May. It remained here during the summer, with one company stationed in the city of Winchester on a monthly rotation. In November the regiment was ordered to quarters across Northamptonshire, Bedfordshire and Buckinghamshire. The Peace of Paris having been negotiated, the regiment was ordered on 10 March 1783 to concentrate its detachments at Northampton to prepare for disembodiment. This was completed by 24 March.

From 1784 to 1792 the militia was kept up to strength by the ballot and was supposed to assemble for 28 days' training annually, even though to save money only two-thirds of the men were actually called out each year. The Earl of Sussex gave up the command on 18 March 1784, and was succeeded by Lord Compton, the Lord Lieutenant's son. He had been a captain and later major in the regiment during its embodiment, and succeeded his father as Earl of Northampton (and Lord Lieutenant) in 1796.

=== French Revolutionary War ===
The militia had already been mobilised before Revolutionary France declared war on Britain on 1 February 1793: the deputy lieutenants called out the Northamptonshire men on 12 January. On 9 February the officer commanding the regiment was ordered to send an officer and detachment of 30 men to Portsmouth, where they would come under the orders of the officer commanding the artillery, probably to learn to operate the two 'battalion guns' with which each militia regiment was issued. (The Earl of Northampton was attending Parliament and Lt-Col the Earl of Westmorland was serving as Lord Lieutenant of Ireland, so the regiment was under the command of Maj Grey Heselrige.) On 19 February the regiment was ordered to billets around Dorset, at Weymouth and Melcombe Regis (5 companies), Wareham, Studland. Swanage and Corfe Castle (2), Abbotsbury and the Isle of Portland (1), Bridport (1), and Lyme Regis and Charmouth (1). One of its first duties was to provide an escort for French prisoners of war who were being marched to the Portsmouth area. Later it was engaged in anti-smuggling patrols. By April the Earl Northampton had arrived to take command of the regiment, which consisted of 16 officers and 578 ORs in 8 companies, with a detachment of recruits later arriving from Northampton.

The French Revolutionary Wars saw a new phase for the English militia: they were embodied for a whole generation, and became regiments of full-time professional soldiers (though restricted to service in Great Britain), which the regular army increasingly saw as a prime source of recruits. They served in coast defences, manned garrisons, guarded prisoners of war, and carried out internal security duties, while their traditional local defence role was taken over by the Volunteers and mounted Yeomanry.

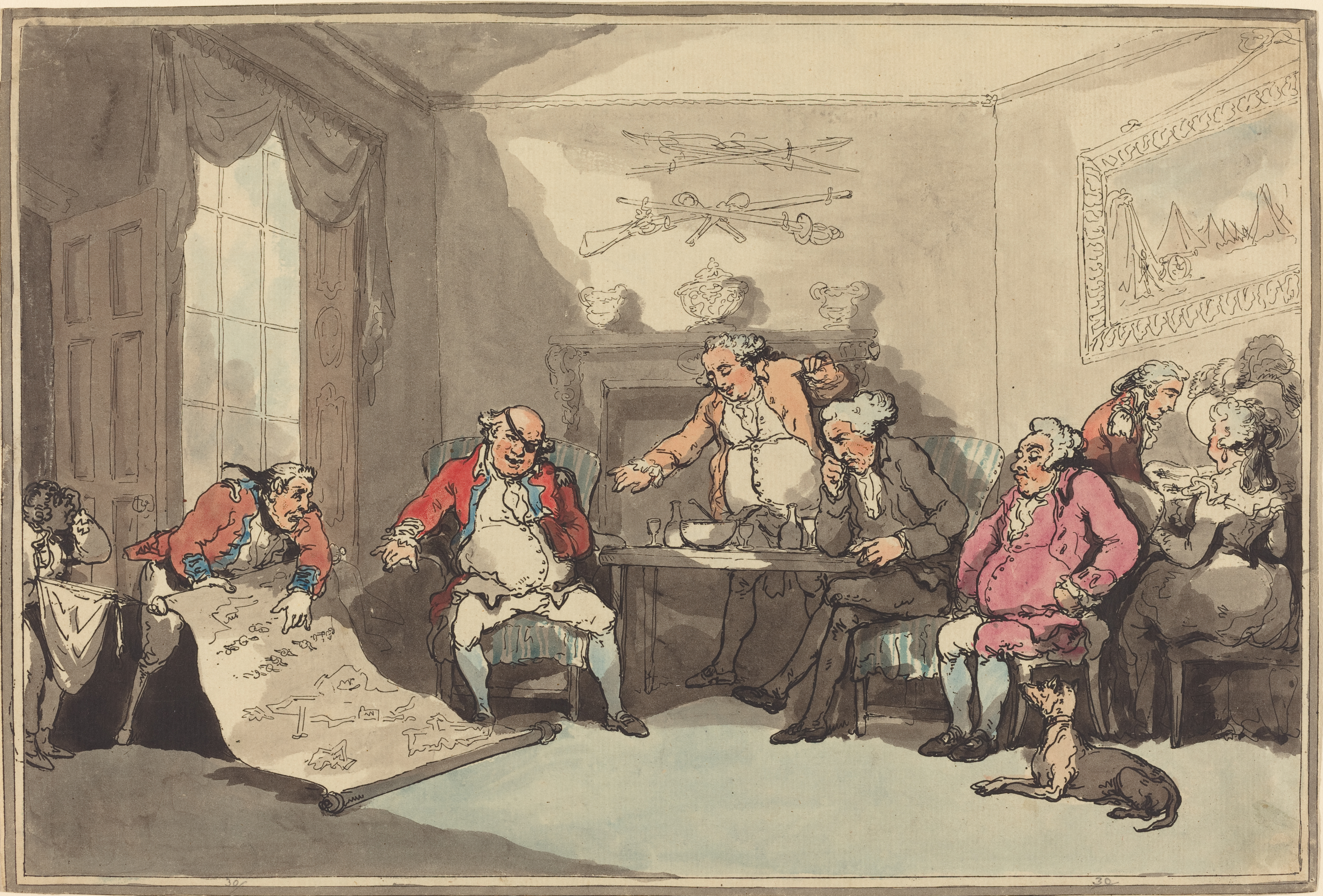
A Militia Meeting by Thomas Rowlandson, probably 1799.

In January 1794 the newly balloted men from Northampton joined at Weymouth, and in April the regiment was ordered to call in its detachments before setting off in May for Roborough Camp above Plymouth. It spent the summer there then went into winter quarters (now 10 companies strong) across south-east Cornwall, at East and West Looe, Bodmin (2 companies), Liskeard (3), Lostwithiel, Cawsand, Fowey and Saltash. By January 1795 it moved into Plymouth, being quartered in the town and the Docks Barracks, leaving the two detached companies at Bodmin. It marched back out to Roborough Camp in June.

Later in June 1795 the regiment moved to Bristol. Shortly after its arrival a troopship anchored off the nearby village of Pill. It had been taking the newly raised Loyal Irish Fencibles from Waterford to Jersey for garrison duties when the troops aboard mutinied and threatened to hang two of their officers, who escaped by jumping overboard. The armed mutineers landed but were surrounded by the Northamptonshire Militia with fixed bayonets. The militia were ordered to withhold their fire, then Sir John Carden's Dragoons charged in and made the ringleaders prisoner. However, the Northamptonshire Militia themselves had been involved in food riots in Plymouth that year.

In October 1796 the regiment moved from Bristol to Winchester. In February 1797 it went to Horsham Barracks, and then moved on to Lewes, arriving on 30 April. It spent the summer camped at Brighton, then returned to Lewes Barracks before going into billets round Winchelsea (3 companies), Rye, (5), Battle (1), and Robertsbridge and Hurst Green (1).

The Earl of Northampton resigned the command early in 1798, and was succeeded on 10 March by Sir Richard Brooke de Capell Brooke (created a baronet in 1803). On 8 July 1798 a general order was issued to form temporary battalions from the flank companies (Grenadier and Light companies) of militia regiments in the Southern District. The Grenadier Company of the Northamptonshires joined those of the Bedfordshire, Denbighshire, Derbyshire, Glamorgan and Middlesex Militia in the 3rd Grenadier Battalion at Shoreham-by-Sea, commanded by Lt-Col Payne of the Bedfordshires. On 4 August the battalion (except the Grenadiers at Shoreham and the Light Company at Battle) moved to Silver Hill Barracks in Sussex for the summer. On 11 October, leaving two companies at Brighton, the regiment took over Shoreham Barracks from the 3rd Grenadier Bn, which was sent to Canterbury.

By May 1799 the regiment had raised two supernumerary companies and marched (less the detached flank companies at Battle and Canterbury) to Deal Barracks, with companies detached to Deal and Sandown Castles, and Nos 2 and 7 Batteries protecting the anchorage of The Downs. In August 4 officers and 400 ORs of the regiment volunteered for the Regular Army, and joined the 4th Foot at Ashford Barracks. They served in that year's Expedition to Holland.

By November 1799 the regiment had been moved to Dover Castle, leaving two companies at Sandown Castle and two in Forts 1 and 2; the flank companies had rejoined, and the Light Company was at St Margaret's Bay. At the end of the year 130 supernumerary men were marched back to Northampton to be disembodied, and the regiment was reduced from 12 to 8 companies. In June it was marched to Hythe (4 companies manning Swiss, Moncrieff and Sutherland Batteries) and Dungeness (4 companies manning Nos 1–4 Batteries). They returned to Dover Castle in April 1801.

=== Supplementary Militia ===
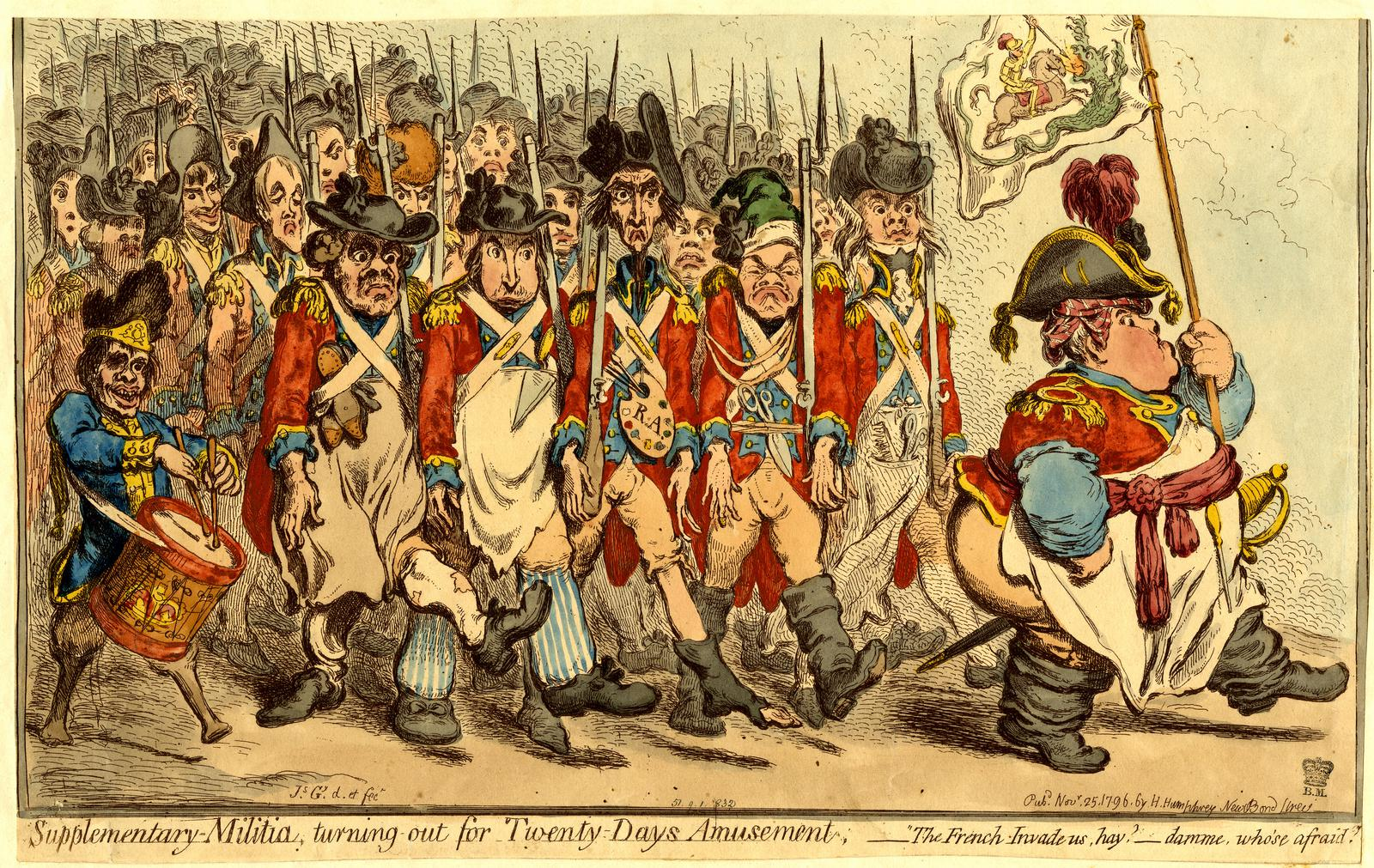
Supplementary-Militia, turning-out for Twenty Days Amusement: 1796 caricature by James Gillray.

In an attempt to have as many men as possible under arms for home defence in order to release regulars, the Government created the Supplementary Militia in October 1796. This was a compulsory levy of men to be trained in their spare time, and to be incorporated in the Regular Militia in emergency. The lieutenancies were required to provide 20 days' initial training as soon as possible, which was carried out by drill teams supplied by the regular county militia. Northamptonshire's additional quota was fixed at 1128 men, with a second regiment being raised.

Again, there was intense opposition in Northamptonshire against the new ballot. At Clipston a crowd forcibly took the warrant and lists away from the constable to prevent the ballot, and there was a large anti-ballot meeting on the road between Northampton and Market Harborough in Leicestershire. There was a riot at Wellingborough, but the crowd dispersed after a speech from one of the magistrates and the arrival of the Yeomanry. At Kettering the meeting was forced to adjourn and its lists were destroyed. At Northampton itself, a mob invaded the room where the meeting was being held, but the deputy lieutenants managed to save the lists, disperse the mob without military help, and complete their work. Balloting was completed in the county by the end of the year.

The supplementary militiamen were trained at eight centres across Northamptonshire by training teams sent from the regular militia regiment serving on the South Coast. They completed their 20 days' training by 29 April 1797 and the training detachments were ordered to return to the regiment on 4 May. In February 1798 the government decided to call out half the supplementary militia to reinforce the regular militia. The order was sent out by the War Office on 19 March and the men marched on 24 March to join the 'Old Regiment' in Kent. The second half of the Northamptonshire supplementaries were embodied on 22 May at Market Hill, Northampton. These were constituted as a separate battalion variously referred to as the 2nd Northamptonshire Militia, or as the Northamptonshire Supplementary Militia. Robert Blenclowe had been appointed a captain in the supplementary militia in January 1797 and promoted to lieutenant-colonel in September; in May 1798 he was appointed Lt-Col Commandant of the 2nd Northamptons with a list of other officers, including his brother-in-law George Robinson as major. One of the captains was Sir William Dolben, 3rd Baronet, who had held the same rank in the Northamptonshire Provisional Cavalry. His grandson, William Somerset Dolben, was also appointed a lieutenant in the 2nd Northamptonshires.

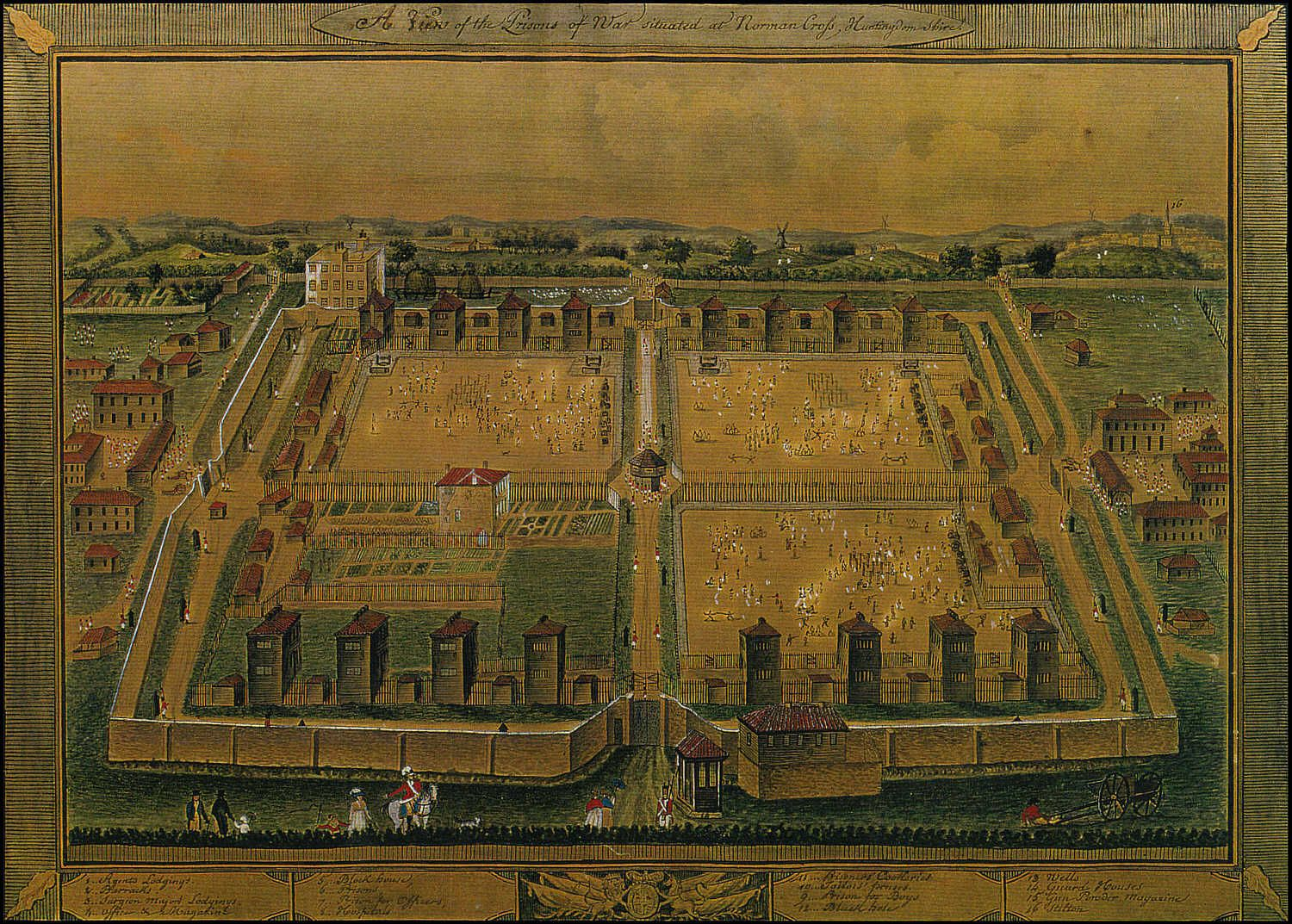
c. 1797 painting of Norman Cross Prison, where the Northampton Militia was stationed at in the same year

After a short period of training the regiment (7 officers, 10 sergeants, 11 drummers and 387 privates in 5 companies) marched out in two divisions on 15 and 16 June on its way to Bury St Edmunds in Suffolk. There were complaints in Northamptonshire that the departure of so many more men would interfere with the harvest and that the cost of supporting the men's families would be an additional burden on the county. From September to November the Northamptonshire Supplementaries were on guard duty at Norman Cross Prison, the largest prisoner-of-war camp in England. It then moved out to nearby Yaxley before leaving at the end of November for winter quarters in Norwich. In May 1799 the 2nd Northamptonshires marched to Braintree, Essex, and were accommodated at Bocking Barracks for the summer. On 30 October the regiment began a march by several stages through the suburbs of London to High Wycombe in Buckinghamshire.

=== Peace of Amiens ===
The Supplementary Militia was stood down at the end of 1799, the 2nd Northamptonshires arriving at Northampton in 12 December to be disbanded. The discharged men were encouraged to enlist in the regular army. There was a renewed invasion scare in 1801 and in August the discharged supernumerary and supplementary militiamen were recalled to the colours at Northampton. They were marched to Dover to join the main body of the regiment. However, by late 1801 peace negotiations were under way, and the militia were returned to their home counties preparatory to being disembodied. The Northamptonshires left Dover for Canterbury on 4 November, and then marched home by four divisions. During December they were quartered in single companies across the county. The Treaty of Amiens was signed in March 1802, and in April the regiment concentrated at Northampton and completed its disembodiment by 24 April. Under the Militia Act 1802 Northamptonshire's militia quota was reduced to 724 men in a single regiment.

=== Napoleonic Wars ===
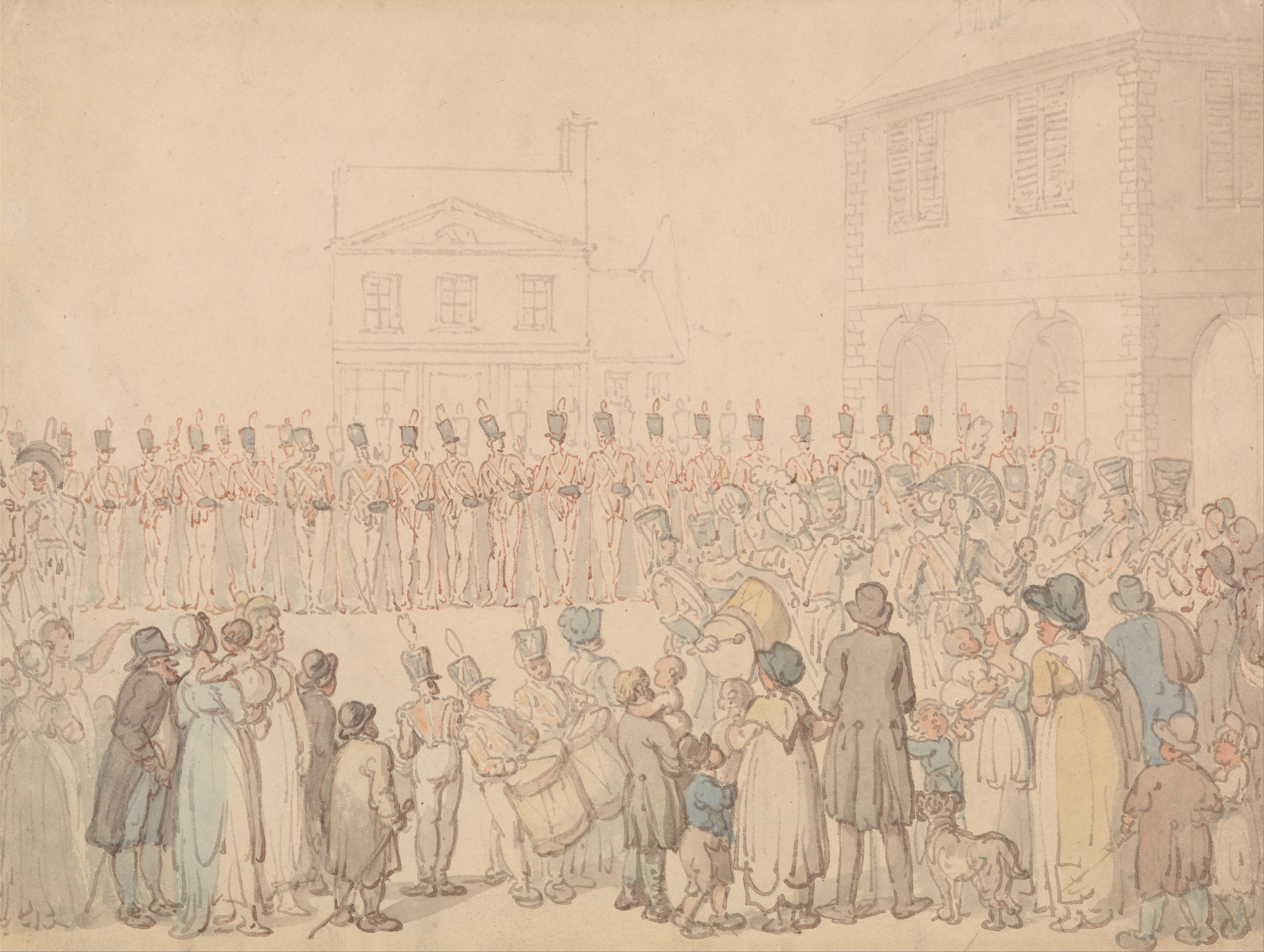
The Northampton Militia being reviewed at Brackley

The Peace of Amiens proving short-lived, the Militia were re-embodied on 24 March 1803, the Northamptonshires (still officially listed as the 1st Battalion, even though the Supernumerary battalion was never reformed) assembling in the Market Place at Northampton. The men were inoculated against smallpox, which caused concern among the townsfolk who thought they were contagious, but in fact the newer cowpox inoculation had been used and they did not need to be quarantined. A month later the quarters were extended to include various villages in West Northamptonshire. Then in May the regiment marched to Dover before being deployed to Deal and Sandown once more.

When the regiment was embodied there were a number of officer vacancies; these were filled in 1803–04 by promotions and new appointments, including Capt Justinian Isham (later 8th Baronet) who was promoted to lt-col, and Lt William Somerset Dolben from the Supplementaries who was promoted to captain and commanded the Grenadier Company. Between June 1803 and January 1804 the regiment was increased to 12 companies, and in July 1805 it was given two lieutenant-colonels and two majors. The second Lt-Col was William Somerset Dolben, and the second major was James Monson Phillips, who had commanded the detached Light Company during the previous embodiment. The Volunteer corps were also revived at this time for local defence. Major George Robinson and Capt Sir William Dolben, formerly of the Northamptonshire Supplementary Militia, became commandants of the Kettering Volunteers and the Finedon Volunteers respectively.

The regular army continued to draw on the militia as a source of recruits. Early in 1805, 221 men from the Northamptons transferred to regiments of the line, and two years later a further 155 were posted to the 48th (Northamptonshire), 69th (South Lincolnshire) and 72nd Regiments. During the summer of 1805, when Napoleon was massing his 'Army of England' at Boulogne for a projected invasion, the regiment (now 803 men in 10 companies again) under the command of Lt-Col Isham was in Dover Castle as part of Maj-Gen Lord Forbes's militia brigade. In November it was moved to Chelmsford Barracks in Essex, then in May 1806 to Woodbridge, Suffolk.

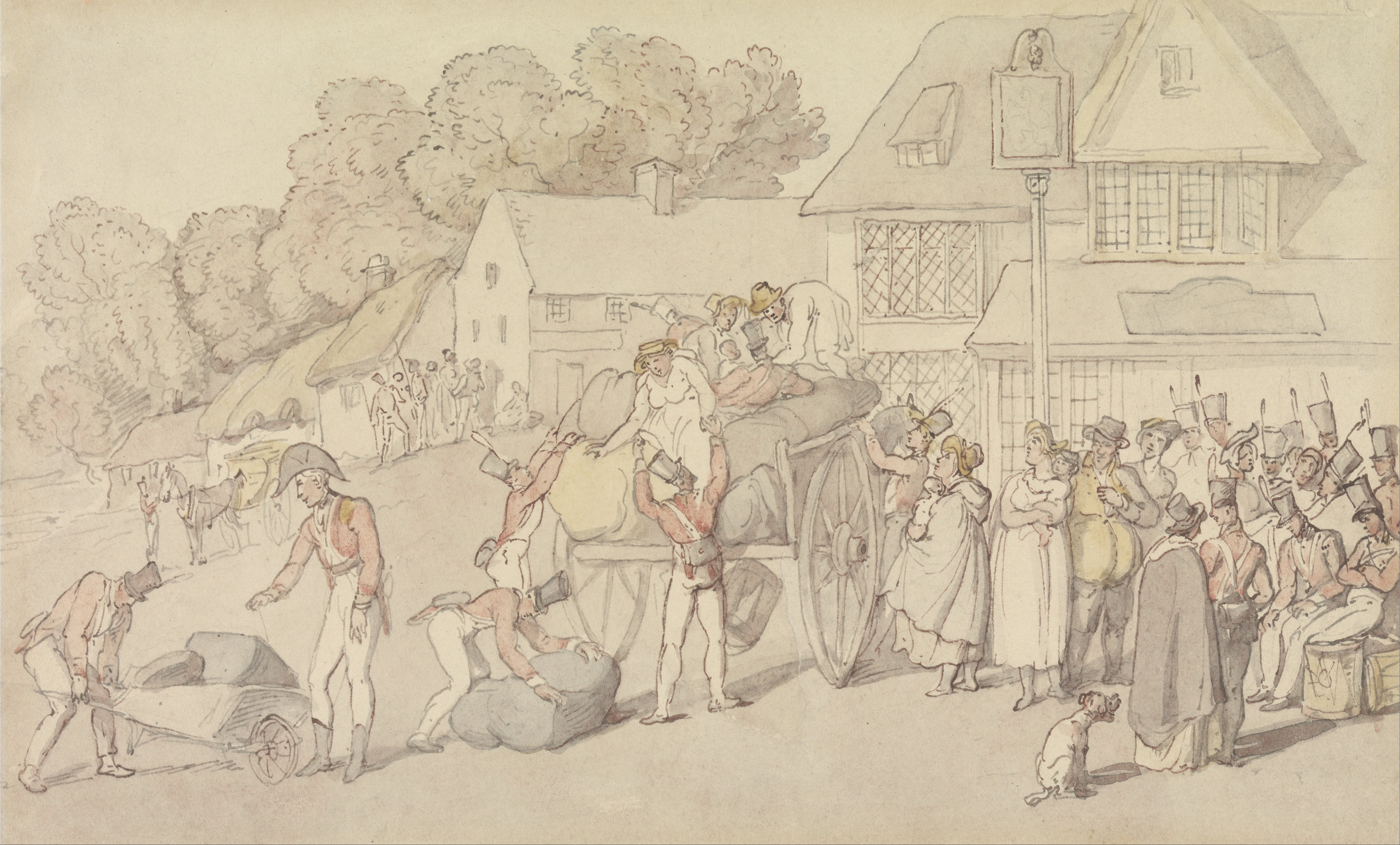
The Arrival of a Company of Militia at an Inn by Thomas Rowlandson.

The regiment remained at Woodbridge Barracks until January 1808, when it was transferred to Norman Cross Prison, where it was joined by the newly balloted men and volunteer recruits from Northampton. In April another 253 men volunteered for the regulars. The Northamptonshires carried out guard duty at the prison camp until July, when they returned to Woodbridge. In May 1809 the regiment was ordered to carry out a long march to Devonshire, but when it had reached Brentford, near London, it was diverted to Gosport. It remained for a long period in the Portsmouth area, including Portchester Castle (another prisoner-of-war camp) while the Northamptonshire lieutenancy struggled to recruit enough substitutes and volunteers to bring it back up to strength.

=== Local Militia ===
While the Regular Militia were the mainstay of national defence during the Napoleonic Wars, they were supplemented from 1808 by the Local Militia, which were part-time and only to be used within their own districts. These were raised to counter the declining numbers of Volunteers, and if their ranks could not be filled voluntarily the militia ballot was employed. They were to be trained once a year.

Northamptonshire raised three regiments of Local Militia:

- Western Regiment (10 companies): John Plomer Clark of Welton Place, formerly Lt-Col of the Daventry Volunteers, was appointed Lt-Col Commandant on 24 December 1808. The officers included a number from the former Brackley Volunteers as well as the Daventry unit. It completed its first training at Daventry in two divisions by 21 June 1809. The following year it received its Regimental colours at a parade at Daventry, but trained in two divisions at Northampton, as it did the following year. It remained at Daventry for training in 1812 and 1813.
- Eastern Regiment (10 companies): John Fane, 10th Earl of Westmorland, formerly Col of the Oundle and Cliffe Volunteers, was appointed Col on 24 March 1809, with many other officers also carried over from that corps. It began its first training (14 days) at Oundle on 29 May 1809, and the following year, now 700 strong, trained for 21 days. It continued annual training until 1813.
- Central Regiment (12 companies): In June 1809 Thomas Samwell was appointed Lt-Col Commandant and William Somerset Dolben as 2nd Lt-Col, both being former Lt-Cols of the Northamptonshire Militia, but this regiment took longer to form – the other officers were only commissioned between December 1809 and May 1810. Apart from a former officer of the Wellingborough Volunteer Cavalry, few of them seem to have had previous experience. It did not begin training at Northampton until late May 1810. It received its colours in 1811, and trained in the Market Place at Northampton each year until 1813. In December 1813 the officers volunteered to serve outside the county, but the regiment never assembled again.

=== Ireland, Scotland and France ===
The Militia Interchange Act 1811 allowed the English and Irish militia to serve in each other's country for up to two years. The Northamptons (less 20 men) were one of the regiments that volunteered and were selected for this service. It appears that the government was happy to send them (and other Midlands militia regiments) to Ireland in case they developed sympathies with the Luddites, who began their machine-breaking in Nottingham in 1811.

At the time the regiment was at Portsmouth guarding prisoners of war aboard the prison hulks. In July it was shipped to Ireland, where it went into garrison at Armagh, and continued to supply drafts of volunteers for the regular army. From Armagh the regiment marched to Newry, where it provided several detachments in the district. It remained in Northern Ireland until April 1813, when it sailed to Portpatrick in Scotland and reached Edinburgh Castle on 17 April.

From November 1813 the militia were invited to volunteer for limited overseas service, primarily for garrison duties in Europe. Four officers and 172 ORs of the Northamptons volunteered for this service, being assigned to the 1st Provisional Battalion. This was commanded by the 2nd Marquess of Buckingham as Lt-Col Commandant, the bulk of the battalion coming from his Royal Buckinghamshire Militia (King's Own). The two Northants companies embarked on small ships at Leith and arrived at Gravesend, from where they marched to Haslar Barracks, Gosport, to join the other constituents of 1st Provisional Bn. With two other provisional battalions they formed a Militia Brigade commanded by Maj-Gen Sir Henry Bayley. The brigade embarked at Portsmouth Harbour on 10–14 March 1814 and sailed to join the Earl of Dalhousie's division that had occupied Bordeaux just as the war was ending. The brigade did not form part of the Army of Occupation after the abdication of Napoleon, and returned to England. 1st Provisional Bn sailed on 6 June and disembarked at Plymouth.

Meanwhile, the main body of the Northamptonshire Militia marched out of Edinburgh Castle on 11 June and embarked at Leith for Hull. It then marched in two divisions to Northampton arriving on 28–29 June. It paraded in the Market Square before being disembodied. At its final parade it was only 4–500 strong, having supplied 324 recruits to the regulars in the past year, and upwards of 1400 during the whole war. The two companies of the 1st Provisional Bn arrived at Northampton from Plymouth on 16 July for disbandment. Unlike some militia regiments, the Northamptonshires were not re-embodied during the short Waterloo Campaign of 1815.

=== Long Peace ===
After Waterloo there was another long peace. The Local Militia was disbanded in 1816. Although officers continued to be commissioned into the Regular Militia and ballots were still held, the regiments were only assembled for training in 1820, 1821, 1825 and 1831, and the permanent staffs of sergeants and drummers (who were occasionally used to maintain public order) were progressively reduced. The ballot was suspended by the Militia Act 1829. Sir Richard de Capell Brooke remained colonel of the Northamptonshire Militia until his death in 1829, and Lt-Col Sir Justinian Isham was promoted to succeed him in March 1830.

In 1845–46 Sir Robert Peel's government made some efforts to revive the militia, replacing elderly permanent staff members and appointing a few younger officers from the county gentry, though they had no duties to perform. Sir Justinian Isham died on 23 March 1845 and Thomas Maunsell, the Member of Parliament (MP) for North Northamptonshire, was appointed Colonel of the Northamptonshires on 2 April 1845. This was followed by the appointment of Lord Burghley as Lt-Col in January 1846 (having only been commissioned as major weeks before), with a number of new captains in that year.

== 1852 Reforms ==
The Peel government was soon out of office and no further action was taken on the militia until it was revived by the Militia Act 1852, enacted during a renewed period of international tension. As before, units were raised and administered on a county basis, and filled by voluntary enlistment (although conscription by means of the Militia Ballot might be used if the counties failed to meet their quotas). Training was for 56 days on enlistment, then for 21–28 days per year, during which the men received full army pay. Under the Act, militia units could be embodied by Royal Proclamation for full-time home defence service in three circumstances:

1. 'Whenever a state of war exists between Her Majesty and any foreign power'.
2. 'In all cases of invasion or upon imminent danger thereof'.
3. 'In all cases of rebellion or insurrection'.

The Northampton Militia was reformed, the adjutant touring the county to drum up recruits, and in October 1852 it assembled 618 strong under Col Maunsell for an initiul 21 day's training at Northampton. It took longer to assemble a new permanent staff, and for the first two years' training it borrowed drill instructors from the 42nd Highlanders. Colonel Maunsell resigned in January 1854 and was succeeded in command by Lord Burghley.

=== Crimean War ===
The regiment carried out its 1854 training in May and the men were dismissed to their homes. However, the Crimean War had broken out and a large expeditionary force sent overseas, so the militia began to be called out for garrison duty at home. The Northamptonshire Militia was embodied in August and was immediately ordered on service to Ireland, departing for Liverpool Docks in two divisions on 24 and 25 August. After crossing the Irish Sea Lord Burghley led the regiment into Dublin on 26 August. Having left a depot company at Northampton for recruiting, the regiment arrived with 18 officers and 786 ORs and was quartered first at Richmond Barrackss and then from December at Linenhall Barracks, described by one officer as an 'abominable habitation'. Most of the duty concerned mounting guard at Dublin Castle and for the comings and goings of the Viceroy of Ireland, but it also took part in a brigade field day in Phoenix Park.

In March 1855 the Northamptonshires, together with a number of other militia regiments, volunteered for overseas garrison service. Some 6–700 men of the regiment volunteered and were re-sworn for this service, while those who did not were returned to the depot at Northampton. The main body of the regiment was shipped back to Liverpool and proceeded by train to Devonport on 16 April, where it was joined by a detachment of volunteers from the Rutland Light Infantry Militia. The regiment did garrison duty at Devonport, where it was presented with new colours. On 19 June they were paraded and embarked on the transport Shooting Star. Their destination was understood to be Malta, but in the event they were sent to garrison Gibraltar. They landed on 30 June, and spent a year there as part of the garrison. A party of the regiment was employed in Spain buying mules for the army, and taking them to the Crimea. After the war was ended by the Treaty of Paris the regiment embarked for home aboard the troopship Great Britain on 6 June 1856. It arrived at Liverpool on 14 June and proceeded by train to Northampton. It received a welcome from the town and held its final parade on Northampton Racecourse on 11 July before being disembodied on 18 July. The regiment received the Battle honour Mediterranean for its service.

Having been recently embodied, the Northamptonshire Militia did not undertake annual training in 1857, but as large numbers of regular units were sent to suppress the Indian Mutiny some militia regiments were called out for home service later in the year. The Northamptons were embodied on 27 October, and on 9 December went by train to Plymouth. There they did ordinary garrison duty until returning to Northampton on 30 April 1858 where they were disembodied. There was an outbreak of rowdiness among the men being paid off, and a number of ringleaders were court-martialed and sentenced to 42 days' hard labour in the military prison at Weedon. The regiment carried out annual training as usual in 1859 and 1860. During the latter training, a brigade field day was held involving the field battery of the Royal Artillery (RA) stationed at Northampton Barracks and the newly-formed 4th and 5th Northamptonshire Rifle Volunteers. One militia company was sent to 'defend' a village, which was 'attacked' by the rest of the force commanded by Lt-Col Elgee, RA, with Lord Burghley leading the assaulting troops.

== Amalgamation ==
By 1860 there was a policy of amalgamating small county militia units with their neighbours to form more efficient regiments. This was done with the two-company Rutland Light Infantry, which amalgamated with the Northamptonshires on 1 October 1860 to form the Northampton and Rutland Militia, under the command of Lt-Col Lord Burghley, with regimental headquarters at Northampton.

As part of the Cardwell Reforms the regiment was linked with the 48th (Northamptonshire) and 58th (Rutlandshire) Regiments in 1872, and in 1881 became the 3rd Battalion of the new Northamptonshire Regiment. In its final incarnation, it became part of the Special Reserve in 1908 and trained thousands of reinforcements for the Northamptons in World War I.

== Colonels ==
The following served as Colonel of the Regiment:

- Henry Yelverton, 3rd Earl of Sussex, appointed 10 January 1763, resigned 18 March 1784
- Charles Compton, 9th Earl of Northampton, appointed March 24, 1784, resigned 1798
- Sir Richard Brooke de Capell Brooke, 1st Baronet, appointed 10 March 1798, died 27 November 1829
- Sir Justinian Isham, 8th Baronet, promoted March 1830, died 23 March 1845
- Thomas Maunsell, MP, appointed 2 April 1845, resigned January 1854

Under the 1852 militia reforms the position of colonel was abolished, and after Col Maunsell's resignation Lt-Col William Cecil, Lord Burghley became Lt-Col Commandant. Colonel Maunsell was appointed as the regiment's first Honorary Colonel on 26 June 1854, which he held until his death in 1866. Lord Burghley (later 3rd Marquess of Exeter) retained the command of the regiment and its successors the Northampton and Rutland Militia and the 3rd Northamptons, with the personal honorary rank of colonel, until he retired in 1887 and became its Hon Col.

== Heritage & ceremonial ==
=== Uniforms & Insignia ===
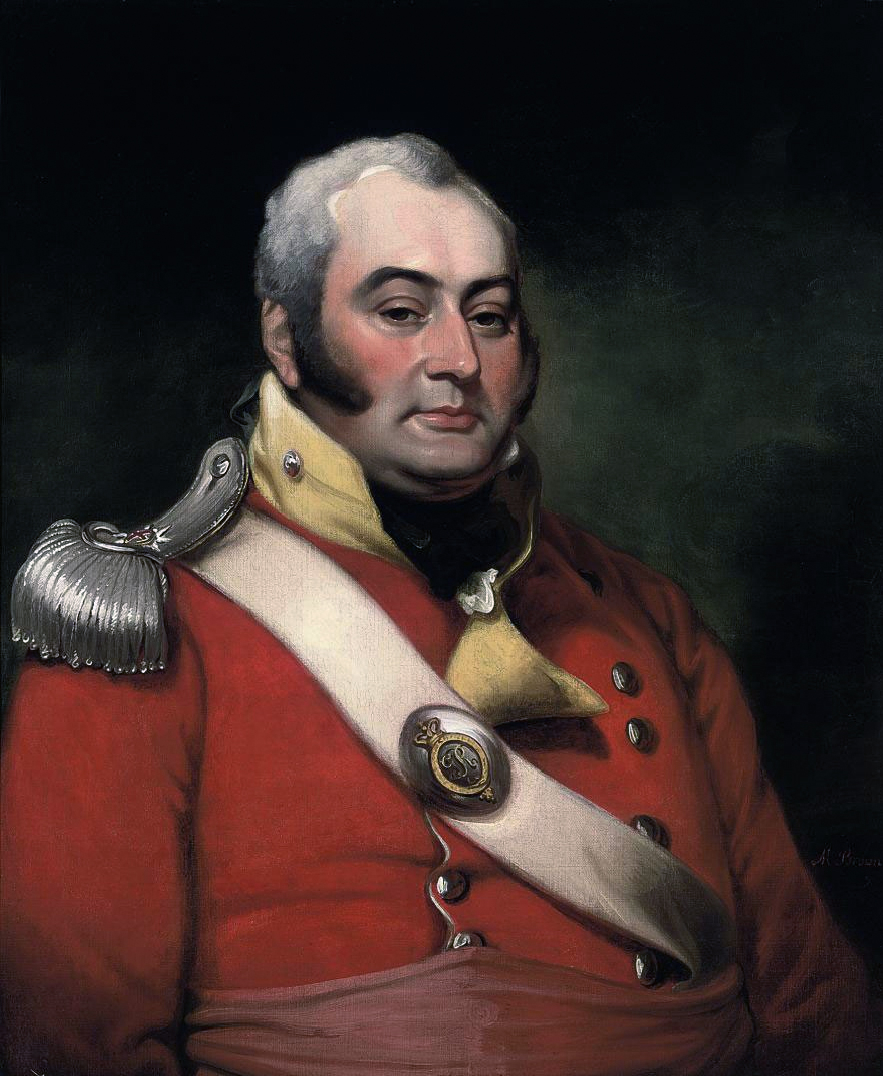
George Fermor, 3rd Earl of Pomfret in the uniform of a captain in the Northamptonshire Militia, a rank he held from 1804.

When the Northampton Militia was camped at Warley in 1778, it wore red uniforms with black facings. Normally the drummers would wear 'reversed colours' but rather than black coats with red facings they are recorded as wearing white with black facings. The regimental facings were still black in 1800, but then changed to primrose yellow or buff (see the portrait of the Earl of Pomfret), which they retained to 1860.

In July 1780 the regiment was issued with 'helmets', presumably the light infantry style of the period, and each company wore a different colour feather in this helmet.

The Central Northamptonshire Local Militia wore an unusual shako badge, with a cut out Royal cypher surrounded by a square frame inscribed 'CENTRAL NORTHAMPTON^{E} LOCAL MILITIA' on the four sides, surmounted by a crown. The button of ca 1810 was a simple lion passant guardant surrounded by the letters 'NORTHAMPTONSHIRE . MILITIA .'

From 1833 until 1855 the coatee buttons had the number '48' in the centre of a Saint George's Cross within a crowned circle inscribed with the regimental title, the whole superimposed on a cut star. The tunic button of 1855–1860 was the same but with the numeral omitted. Prior to 1837 the officers' buttons had the Royal Cypher within a crowned Garter inscribed 'HONI SOIT QUI MAL Y PENSE', with a scroll inscribed 'NORTHAMPTON' above the crown, and another inscribed 'MILITIA' below the garter.

About 1850 the officers' shoulder-belt plate bore St George's Cross within a crowned garter, with a scroll underneath inscribed 'NORTHAMPTON", all superimposed on a cut star. From 1854 to 1860 the shako plate bore the same design, the Grenadier Company having a small grenade at the bottom.

=== Precedence ===
During the War of American Independence the counties were given an order of precedence for their militia regiments that was determined by ballot each year. For the Northamptonshire Militia the positions were:

- 36th on 1 June 1778
- 18th on 12 May 1779
- 33rd on 6 May 1780
- 44th on 28 April 1781
- 37th on 7 May 1782

The militia order of precedence balloted for in 1793 (Northants was 45th) remained in force throughout the French Revolutionary War. Another ballot for precedence took place in 1803 at the start of the Napoleonic War, when Northants was 29th. This order continued until 1833. In that year the King drew the lots for individual regiments and the resulting list remained in force with minor amendments until the end of the militia. The regiments raised before the peace of 1763 took the first 47 places; Northants was placed at 48th, and this was retained when the list was revised in 1855 and after the merger with the Rutlands in 1860. Most militia regiments ignored the numeral, but the Northamptonshires carried the '48' on their buttons 1833–55, and the new colours presented in 1855 carried the numeral at the centre. Later under the Cardwell System the regiment was coincidentally linked with the 48th (Northamptonshire) Regiment.

=== Battle honour ===
The Northamptonshire Militia was awarded the Battle honour Mediterranean for its service in Gibraltar in 1855–56, and this was embroidered on the colours.

== See also ==
- Northamptonshire Trained Bands
- Militia (English)
- Militia (Great Britain)
- Militia (United Kingdom)
- Rutland Militia
- Northampton and Rutland Militia
