= Rutland Militia =

Auxiliary unit of the British Army

Rutlandshire Militia Rutland Light Infantry
- Active: 1558–1860
- Country: England (1558–1707); Kingdom of Great Britain (1707–1800); United Kingdom (1801–1860)
- Branch: Militia
- Role: Infantry
- Size: 1–2 Companies
- Garrison/HQ: Oakham

The Rutlandshire Militia, (Note: There is no consistency in the sources as to whether the regiment was the 'Rutland' or 'Rutlandshire' Militia, both forms being used indiscriminately.) later the Rutland Light Infantry, was an auxiliary military unit from the small English Midland county of Rutland. From their formal organisation as Trained Bands in 1558 the Militia of Rutland served during times of international tension and major wars. They provided internal security and home defence, relieving regular troops from routine garrison duties, and acting as a source of trained officers and men for the Regular Army. The regiment was amalgamated with that of neighbouring Northamptonshire in 1860.

== Early History ==
The English militia was descended from the Anglo-Saxon Fyrd, the military force raised from the freemen of the shires under command of their Sheriff. It continued under the Norman kings, notably at the Battle of the Standard (1138). The force was reorganised under the Assizes of Arms of 1181 and 1252, and again by King Edward I's Statute of Winchester of 1285. The main threats were from Scotland, Wales or France: as an inland county in the Midlands, Rutland avoided most of the demands.

== Rutlandshire Trained Bands ==
The legal basis of the militia was updated by two Acts of 1557 covering musters and the maintenance of horses and armour. The county militia was now under the Lord Lieutenant, assisted by the Deputy Lieutenants and Justices of the Peace (JPs). The entry into force of these Acts in 1558 is seen as the starting date for the organised county militia in England. Although the militia obligation was universal, the disorderly force assembled against the Rising of the North confirmed that it was impractical to train and equip every able-bodied man, so after 1572 the practice was to select a proportion of men for the Trained Bands, (TBs). They were trained by professional captains and muster-masters for up to 10 days each year. Full musters were held about every three years when the arms and armour were inspected.

The threat of invasion during the Spanish War led to an increase in training. At first the government emphasised the 17 'maritime' counties most vulnerable to attack, and it was not until 1586 that the inland counties were placed under lords-lieutenant, ordered to appoint captains and muster-master corporals and to intensify training. The TBs were placed on alert in April 1588 and brought to an hour's notice in June. When warning of the invasion Armada arrived the TBs were mobilised on 23 July. The number of men mustered by Rutland does not appear to be separately listed.

In the 16th Century little distinction was made between the militia and the troops levied by the counties for overseas expeditions, and between 1585 and 1601 Rutlandshire supplied 220 levies for service in Ireland and 50 for France. However, the counties usually conscripted the unemployed and criminals rather than the Trained Bandsmen – in 1585 the Privy Council had ordered the impressment of able-bodied unemployed men, and the Queen ordered 'none of her trayned-bands to be pressed'. Replacing the weapons issued to the levies from the militia armouries was a heavy burden on the counties.

With the passing of the threat of invasion, the trained bands declined in the early 17th Century. Training for the TBs dropped to two days a year from 1601. From 1623 TB training was stepped up, and this was pursued enthusiastically by King Charles I who attempted to reform them into a national force or 'Perfect Militia' answering to the crown rather than local control. The 1624 levy conscripted 5 farm workers, 15 labourers, 1 gentleman, 2 yeomen and 23 craftsmen from Rutland. When Sir Jacob Astley inspected the Rutlandshire TBs in 1638 they consisted of 60 musketeers and 40 corslets (body armour, signifying pikemen); in addition the TB Horse comprised 30 light horse.

=== Civil Wars ===
In 1639 and 1640 Charles attempted to employ the TBs for the Bishops' Wars in Scotland. However, many of those sent on this unpopular service were untrained replacements and conscripts, and many officers were corrupt or inefficient. For the Second Bishops' War of 1640 Rutlandshire was ordered to march 60 men to Newcastle upon Tyne for service in Scotland, but there was considerable opposition across the county. It seems that many of the trained bandsmen nationwide escaped service and raw substitutes were sent in their place. With the harvest approaching, Rutland sent no yeomen or farmworkers out of the county. The Scottish campaign ended in failure.

Control of the TBs was one of the major points of dispute between Charles I and Parliament that led to the First English Civil War. When open warfare broke out in 1642 neither side made much use of the TBs beyond securing the county armouries for their own full-time troops who would serve anywhere in the country, many of whom were former trained bandsmen.

Once Parliament had re-established full control it passed new Militia Acts in 1648 and 1650 that replaced lords lieutenant with county commissioners appointed by Parliament or the Council of State. At the same time the term 'Trained Band' began to disappear. During the Scottish invasion of 1651 the Rutland Militia was ordered to a rendezvous with other regiments at Northampton in August, but unlike some of the revived county militias it did not serve in the Worcester Campaign. Under the Commonwealth and Protectorate the militia operated alongside the New Model Army to control the country.

== Restoration Militia ==
After the Restoration of the Monarchy, the English Militia was re-established by the Militia Act of 1661 under the control of the king's lords-lieutenant, the men to be selected by parishes or paid substitutes. Companies would be trained for two days four times a year, and brought together for four days' annual regimental training. This was popularly seen as the 'Constitutional Force' to counterbalance a 'Standing Army' tainted by association with the New Model Army that had supported Cromwell's military dictatorship, and almost the whole burden of home defence and internal security was now entrusted to the militia. In the early years of King Charles II's reign the militia's duties included suppressing non-conformist religious assemblies under the Conventicle Act 1664, and providing a system of 'standing guards', with each half troop or half company in turn doing seven days' continuous service. The militia were called out for national defence during the Anglo-Dutch wars.

The situation changed when King James II came to the throne in 1685. The militia were embodied during the Monmouth Rebellion that year, and those in the West Country did see action against the rebels. However, after Monmouth's defeat at the Battle of Sedgemoor James downgraded the militia in favour of building up his standing army. The militia played almost no part when Prince William of Orange landed in the West Country in November 1688, and James's regime collapsed in the 'Glorious Revolution'.

The Militia continued to be mustered periodically under William's reign. In 1697 the counties were required to submit detailed lists of their militia, when the Rutlands under the Lord Lieutenant, Lord Sherard, consisted of one company of foot, 93 strong, under Capt Millesburne Sill, and a troop of 53 horse under the Lord-Lieutenant's son, Capt Bennet Sherard, Member of Parliament (MP) for Rutland.

The militia mustered for annual training until the Treaty of Utrecht and the accession of King George I. It was of little use against the Jacobite rising of 1715, and fell into virtual abeyance across the whole country in the following years.

== 1757 Reforms ==
Under threat of French invasion during the Seven Years' War a series of Militia Acts from 1757 reorganised the county militia regiments, the men being conscripted by means of parish ballots (paid substitutes were permitted) to serve for three years. In peacetime they assembled for 28 days' annual training, but could be embodied for permanent service in wartime. There was a property qualification for officers, who were commissioned by the lord lieutenant. An adjutant and drill sergeants were to be provided to each regiment from the Regular Army, and arms and accoutrements would be supplied when the county had secured 60 per cent of its quota of recruits.

Rutland was assessed to raise a corps of 120 men. As a small county, the property qualification for militia officers in Rutland was lowered in order to find enough of them. The corps was raised at Oakham by the Lord Lieutenant of Rutland, the Earl of Exeter, who later appointed George Bridges Brudenell, MP for Rutland, to the command. The order to issue it with arms was given on 27 November 1759. The Rutlandshire Militia was first embodied for permanent service on 15 December following.

In January 1760 the two companies of the corps were quartered at Oakham and Uppingham, then in May they were ordered to Bristol, with a detachment at Portishead. The duties included guarding French prisoners of war. After five months the corps was ordered back to Rutland, and stayed there until late in 1761, during which it was employed escorting prisoners of war through northern England. In June 1762 it was moved to Hull and Barton-upon-Humber. However, the war was coming to an end, and the corps was marched back to its home county in July, where it was disembodied early in December. Thereafter it carried out its month's training in 1765, 1766, 1769, 1772 and 1773. In May 1776, it was training at Oakham when the men were sent to help fight a fire that threatened to destroy the nearby village of Belton.

The militia was disembodied in 1762 as the war was coming to an end, and continued with their annual training thereafter.

=== American War of Independence ===
The militia was embodied on 31 March 1778 during the War of American Independence when the country was threatened with invasion by the Americans' allies, France and Spain. On embodiment the two companies of the Rutlands were commanded by captains the Earl of Winchilsea and Nottingham and William Burton. In addition to their balloted men, regiments were permitted to augment their strength by a company recruited from volunteers. It became common to assemble the militia in summer training camps alongside Regular forces. In June the Rutlands were ordered to Warley Camp in Essex, where the corps spent five months, before marching back to Oakham for winter quarters. The route was roundabout, the War Office apparently being unaware where Oakham was. In 1778 the Rutlands were at Warley Camp.

For the next few years the Rutland Militia served in Kent. In June 1779 the corps was marched to join Coxheath Camp near Maidstone. This was the army's largest training camp, where the Militia were exercised as part of a division alongside Regular troops while providing a reserve in case of French invasion of South East England. The understrength militia units from small counties (Anglesey, Carnarvon and Rutland) were attached to guard the artillery park of the division, and they were later criticised as having worked as artillery and forgotten their infantry training. When the camp was broken up the Rutlands marched on 22 November to winter quarters in nearby Maidstone. The following summer the corps was at Dartford Camp from June to October, and then quartered at Faversham and Ospringe. By now the Earl of Winchilsea was serving in the Regular Army and Capt Burton had become the Major-Commandant of the Rutlands. The corps was at Coxheath again in the summer of 1781, after which they marched back to Rutland for the winter. In April 1782 the corps concentrated at Uppingham and marched to Biggleswade in Bedfordshire, and a few weeks later marched off to Warley Camp once more. On 7 November the Rutlands were ordered to march through Essex and South London to Richmond Hill and Kew, where they did duty guarding the royal family at Kew Palace. During the winter their quarters included the nearby villages of Mortlake and Barnes.

By 1783 hostilities were coming to an end (the Treaty of Paris was signed later in the year) and the militia could be sent to their home counties and stood down. After three months' service at Richmond the Rutlands began the march back and were disembodied at Oakham after a parade on 14 March.

From 1784 to 1792 the militia regiments were kept up to strength by the ballot and were supposed to assemble for 28 days' training annually, even though to save money only two-thirds of the men were actually called out each year.

=== French Revolutionary War ===
The militia had already been embodied from December 1792 before Revolutionary France declared war on Britain on 1 February 1793. The French Revolutionary Wars saw a new phase for the English militia: they were embodied for a whole generation, and became regiments of full-time professional soldiers (though restricted to service in the British Isles), which the regular army increasingly saw as a prime source of recruits. They served in coast defences, manned garrisons, guarded prisoners of war, and carried out internal security duties, while their traditional local defence duties were taken over by the Volunteers and mounted Yeomanry.

In April 1793 the Rutlands were ordered to Hertford, and after a month there were moved to quarters at Waltham Abbey and Waltham Cross. In May they marched to Canterbury, and the two companies were then quartered in Margate and Ramsgate. They returned to Canterbury Barracks in July, and then by 8 August were at Dover. In October they carried out a march by detachments through the Kent and Sussex coastal towns as far as Littlehampton before returning to winter quarters in Dover. They spent the following summer at Shorncliffe Camp, and after a spell back at Dover the winter of 1794–95 was spent with Maj Burton's company at Shorncliffe Fort and Capt Edwards' at Folkestone and Sandgate. In the spring of 1795 the corps was redistributed between Shorncliffe, Fort Sutherland and Fort Moncrieff, where they remained into 1796. In June 1796 the Rutlands marched to Forton Barracks near Gosport in Hampshire. During 1797 they moved a short distance to Fareham Barracks, where they remained until the beginning of 1798. In February 1798 they shifted to Hilsea Barracks at Portsmouth.

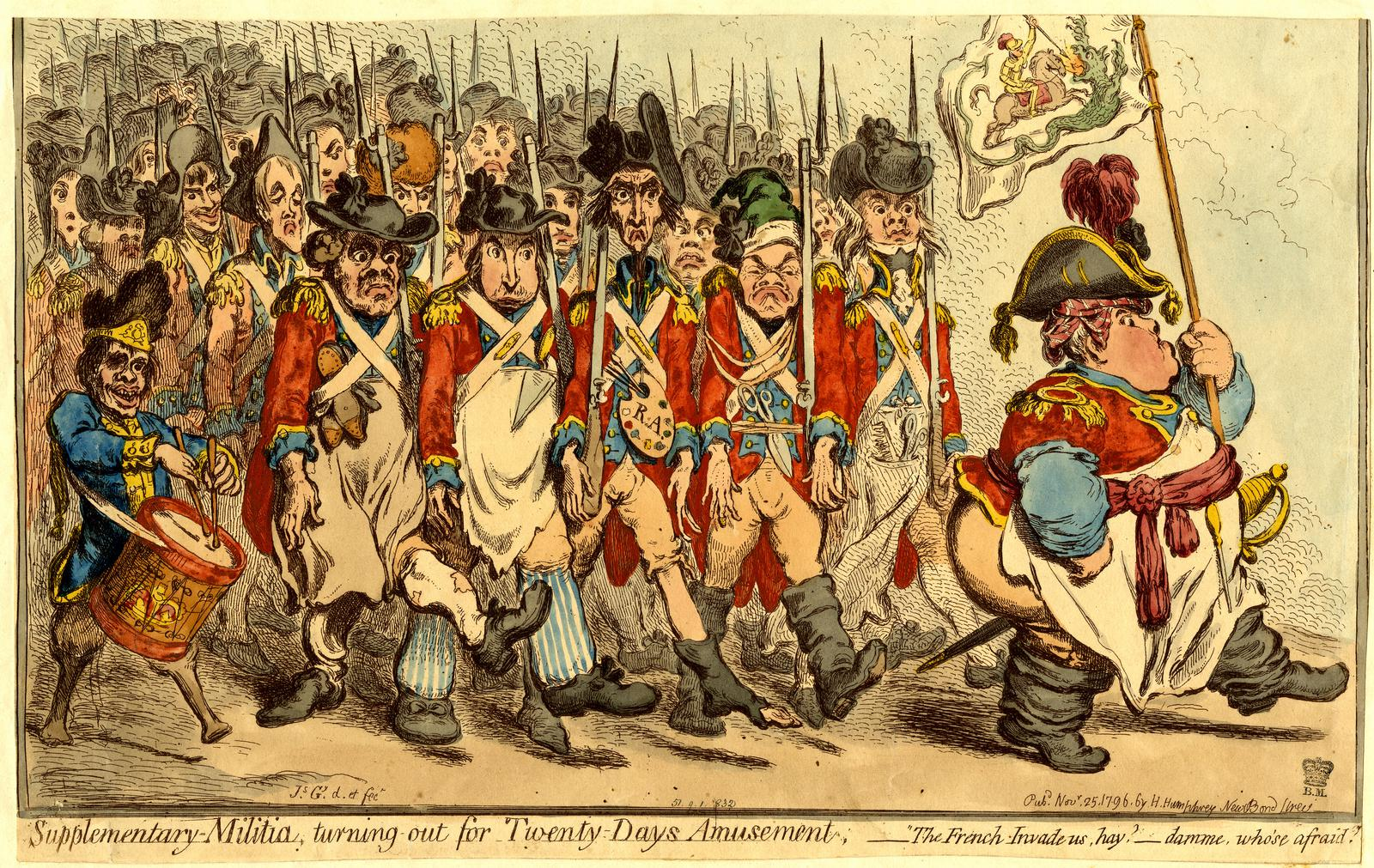
Supplementary-Militia, turning-out for Twenty Days Amusement: 1796 caricature by James Gillray.

In an attempt to have as many men as possible under arms for home defence in order to release regulars, the Government created the Supplementary Militia in 1796, a compulsory levy of men to be trained in their spare time, and to be incorporated in the Militia in emergency. Rutland's additional quota was fixed 80 men. The Supplementary Militia were embodied in 1798, and on 26 March the Rutland detachment was ordered to march from Oakham to join the rest of the corps at Hilsea, later being diverted to Elson Barracks near Gosport, where the Rutlands had moved. In 1799 the corps returned to Dover, where they were quartered until the autumn. They then marched in stages back to Oakham by the end of the year. After six months at headquarters they were moved to quarters at Godmanchester, Huntingdonshire, in June 1800. By August 1801 they were at King's Lynn in Norfolk.

Michael Pierrepoint was appointed major-commandant of the Rutland Militia on 19 October 1801 (he already held the rank of lieutenant-colonel in the general militia list dated 24 October 1799, having commanded the Rutlandshire Fencible Cavalry, disbanded early in 1800).

The Treaty of Amiens was signed in March 1802 and the militia were marched to their home counties and disembodied. The Supplementary Militia had been stood down in 1799, the discharged men being encouraged to enlist in the Regular Army. In 1802 Rutlandshire's quota was reduced to 83 men.

=== Napoleonic Wars ===
The Peace of Amiens proving short-lived, the Rutland Militia were re-embodied on 25 March 1803 marched to Bristol. The militia resumed their normal duties. Increasingly, they were seen as a source of trained men for the Regulars and were encouraged to transfer, for a bounty, and the militia was replenished by use of the ballot and voluntary recruitment. In March 1805 the Rutlands marched from Bristol to Milford Haven in Pembrokeshire.

During the invasion crisis of 1805, while Napoleon assembled the 'Army of England' across the English Channel at Boulogne, the Rutlandshire Militia (107 men under Maj Pierrepoint) formed part of Maj-Gen Isaac Gascoyne's brigade at Haverfordwest in Pembrokeshire. One company was in Milford Haven Barracks and town, the other in Hubberston Barracks and town.

In April 1806 the Rutlands returned to Bristol until the end of November when they were ordered back to Kent, to be quartered at Deal Barracks. They spent a year there and at nearby St Margaret's Bay Barracks. In 1808 the little corps volunteered for service in the Peninsular War, but the offer was politely refused.

In 1810 the corps, in common with a number of the smaller Welsh militia units, was designated as light infantry, and replaced their drums with bugles.

=== Local Militia ===
While the Regular Militia were the mainstay of national defence during the Napoleonic Wars, they were supplemented from 1808 by the Local Militia, which were part-time and only to be used within their own districts. These were raised to counter the declining numbers of Volunteers, and if their ranks could not be filled voluntarily the militia ballot was employed. They were to be trained once a year. Major Gerard Noel Noel and the officers and men of the infantry volunteer corps of the Rutland Legion handed in their resignations at their training assembly in June 1810 and in May 1811 the Lord Lieutenant appointed Capt James Tiptaft and other officers to the new Rutland Local Militia. (The cavalry of the Rutland Legion continued as the Rutland Yeomanry Cavalry.)

=== Ireland ===
The Militia Interchange Act 1811 allowed the English and Irish militia to serve in each other's country for up to two years. The Rutlands were one of the units that volunteered and was selected. It appears that the government was happy to send the Rutland Light Infantry (and other Midlands militia regiments) to Ireland in case they developed sympathies with the Luddites, who began their machine-breaking in Nottingham in 1811.

The corps was garrisoning the forts at Deal, Kent, when their orders arrived on 6 September. They marched into Dover and boarded the transport Reward, sailing on 8 September and arriving at Cork Harbour on the night of 16 September. The Rutlands were sent to Moate in County Westmeath, where they were quartered until 6 May 1812. They were then stationed at Wicklow for the second part of their service. On 10 April 1813 they marched to Cork Barracks where they were quartered until 1 May when they proceeded to Monkstown to board the transport Fox. They sailed for England on 15 April and disembarked at Portsmouth on 21 April. Over the following weeks they were quartered in Kent, at Sevenoaks, Canterbury and then Ramsgate. The corps left Ramsgate on 14 April 1814 and went to Norman Cross Prison in Huntingdonshire where militia units guarded the largest Prisoner-of-war camp in England. However, Napoleon had abdicated by now, and the Rutland LI were marched back to Oakham on 21 June, where they were disembodied on 14 July. Unlike some militia units they do not seem to have been re-embodied during the short Waterloo campaign.

=== Long Peace ===
After Waterloo there was another long peace. The local militia were disbanded in 1816. Although ballots were still held, the regular militia regiments were rarely assembled for training and their permanent staffs of sergeants and drummers were progressively reduced. Officers continued to be commissioned sporadically. The Hon Henry Lewis Noel, son of the Earl of Gainsborough and a former lieutenant in the 68th Foot was appointed Captain-Commandant of the disembodied regiment on 7 March 1840. He continued in command when the regiment was revived on 4 October 1852, and retained it until its merger with the Northants in 1860.

== 1852 Reforms ==
The Militia of the United Kingdom was revived by the Militia Act 1852, enacted during a renewed period of international tension. As before, units were raised and administered on a county basis, and filled by voluntary enlistment (although conscription by means of the Militia Ballot might be used if the counties failed to meet their quotas). Training was for 56 days on enlistment, then for 21–28 days per year, during which the men received full army pay. The Militia was transferred from the Home Office to the War Office (WO).

Rutland's quota was 109 men, 68 to be recruited in the first year. New younger officers, many of them ex-Regulars, were appointed to the revived regiments. The Rutland LI's officers were commissioned on 4 October 1852, with the Hon Henry Noel re-commissioned as captain commanding. Sixty volunteers assembled at Oakham on 9 November 1852, for 21 days' training, and 99 for 28 days' training on 17 May 1853, including an inspection at Uppingham on 4 June. The 1854 training began on 28 April, just after the declaration of the Crimean War. Although the Rutland corps was not embodied for service during the war, a detachment did volunteer to serve with the Northampton Militia, who did a year's garrison duty at Gibraltar. The small corps also supplied volunteers to the Regular Army. It continued its annual training thereafter.

However, in 1860 a number small militia corps like Rutland and the Welsh counties were amalgamated with neighbours to form larger regiments. The Rutland LI was merged with the Northampton Militia on 1 October 1860 to form the Northampton and Rutland Militia with its headquarters at Northampton. In 1874 the Northampton & Rutlands formed a second battalion, but unlike some of the Welsh de-mergers, this did not result in the Rutlands regaining their independence. The Northampton & Rutland Militia became a battalion of the Northamptonshire Regiment in 1881.

== Commanding officers ==
The following officers commanded the Rutland Militia:

- Col Brownlow Cecil, Earl of Exeter, Lord Lieutenant of Rutland 1759, resigned command 1760
- Maj George Bridges Brudenell, appointed 1760, resigned 1778
- Maj George Finch, Earl of Winchilsea and Nottingham, appointed 1778, resigned 31 July 1779
- Maj William Burton, appointed 31 July 1779, resigned 1801
- Maj Michael Pierrepoint, appointed 19 October 1801, resigned 1852
- Capt Hon Henry Lewis Noel, appointed 4 October 1852, resigned February 1861

== Heritage and ceremonial ==
=== Uniforms and insignia ===
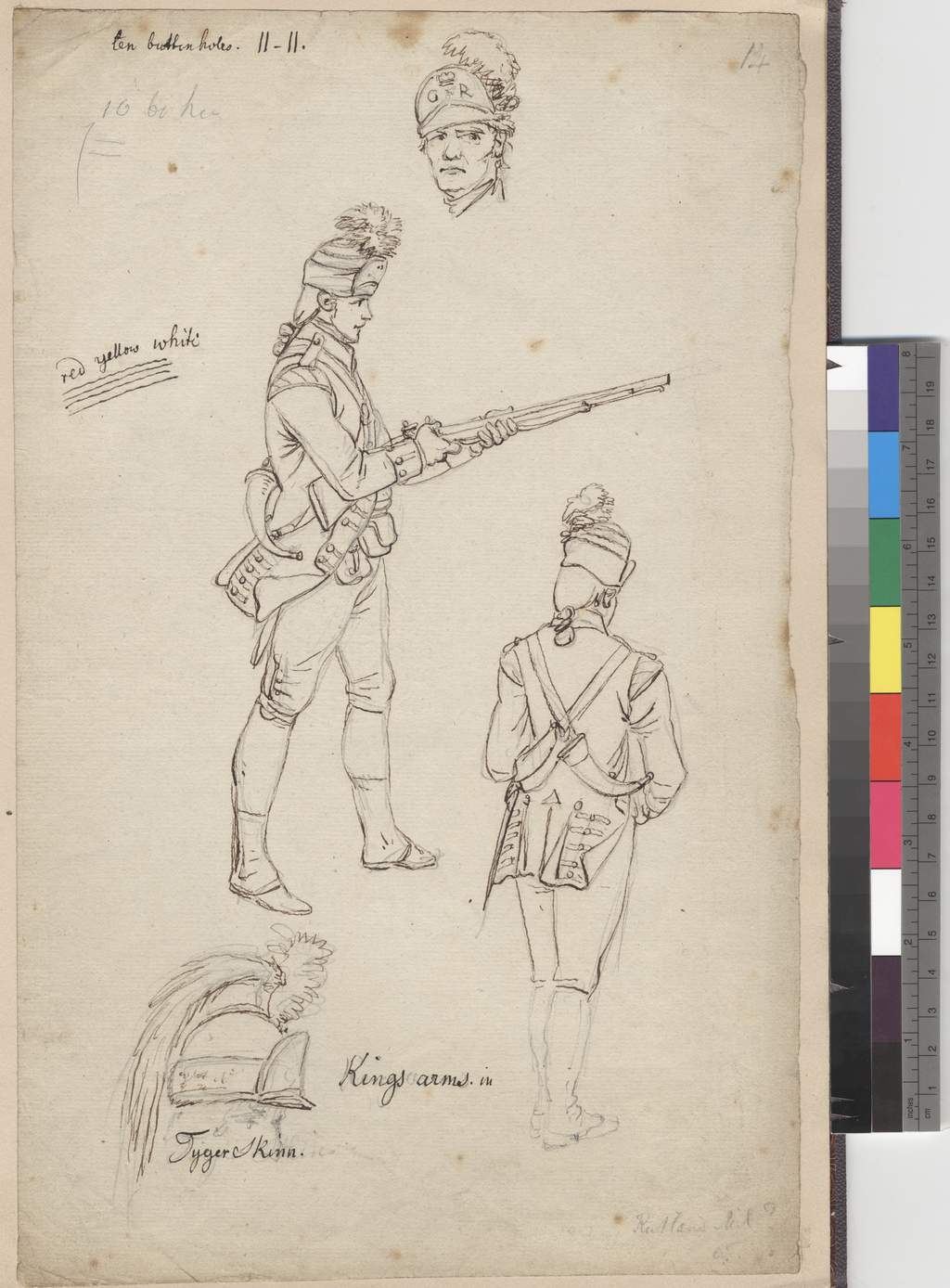
Rutland Militia at Warley Camp in 1778, depicted by Philip James de Loutherbourg (Anne S. K. Brown Military Collection).

The regiment's uniform in 1759 was red with pale buff facings. The Regimental colour was pale buff with the coat of arms of the lord lieutenant, the Earl of Exeter, in the centre. At Warley camp in 1778 the facings were yellow, and the men wore a black leather light infantry cap or helmet with the Royal cypher on the front, a yellow turban, white horsehair plume and 'a little black feather' on the right. A separate sketch of a cap with the King's Arms on the front and with a tigerskin turban may depict an officer's cap. The lace was red–yellow–white and worn as paired button-loops and five rows on the skirts of the short jacket. The drummers wore 'reversed colours', ie yellow jackets faced red, and caps rather than bearskins. As well as the cap and short jacket, the men carry a powder-horn in light infantry style. The small Welsh militia units also wear light infantry helmets; they and the Rutlands provided the artillery guard at Coxheath the following year.

The facings remained yellow during the early 19th Century, but reverted to buff after the regiment was revived in 1852.

The badge of the Rutland Militia was an inverted horseshoe, the ancient badge of Oakham. The buttons carried the horseshoe beneath a crown. The horseshoe badge was inherited by the Northants & Rutland Militia, and through them by the Northamptonshire Regiment, which wore it as a collar badge.

=== Precedence ===
In September 1759 it was ordered that militia regiments on service were to take precedence from the date of their arrival in camp. In 1760 this was altered to a system of drawing lots where regiments did duty together. During the War of American Independence the counties were given an order of precedence determined by ballot each year. However, with a strength of (usually) two companies, the Rutland Militia did not amount to a full battalion and did not usually parade in the infantry line, being often used as artillery train guards, so it did not draw lots for seniority.

A ballot for precedence took place on 11 June 1803 at the start of the Napoleonic War and remained in force until 1833. This time Rutlandshire was included and received the number 63. In 1833 the King drew the lots for individual regiments and the resulting list continued in force with minor amendments until the end of the militia. The regiments raised before the peace of 1763 took the first 47 places; the Rutlands became 4th. Most regiments took little notice of the numeral. However, there was dispute over the seniority of some of the 'old' regiments and when the list was finally revised in 1855 the Rutlands had been relegated to 14th. The amalgamated Northampton and Rutland regiment received the Northamptons' lower precedence of 48.

== See also ==
- Trained bands
- Militia (England)
- Militia (Great Britain)
- Militia (United Kingdom)
- Northampton Militia
- Northampton and Rutland Militia
- Northamptonshire Regiment
