= Daniel Finch =

Daniel Finch may refer to:

- Daniel Finch, 2nd Earl of Nottingham and 7th Earl of Winchilsea (1647–1730)
- Daniel Finch, 8th Earl of Winchilsea (1689–1769), British politician
