= Thomas Noel (MP) =

British politician

Thomas Noel (c. 1705–1788) was a British politician who sat in the House of Commons in two periods between 1728 and 1788.

== Early life ==
Noel was the son of Hon. John Noel and his wife Elizabeth Sherard, daughter of Bennet Sherard, 2nd Baron Sherard. He was a grandson of Baptist Noel, 3rd Viscount Campden. His father died in 1718 and his brother John on 6 January 1728 so he succeeded to the family estate at Walcot in Northamptonshire. In 1730 he established his pack of hounds, initially at Exton in Rutland and he became the first master of the Cottesmore Hunt, as they were named after he moved them to Cottesmore in 1740. As an authority on hound breeding, he published the first book on the subject in 1732.

== Political career ==
The Noel family had represented Rutland since the middle of the sixteenth century. In 1728 Noel was elected Member of Parliament for Rutland in a by-election caused by the death of his brother who held the seat. He was re-elected unopposed at Rutland with his cousin James Noel in 1734. He did not stand at the 1741 general election.

Noel was again returned at Rutland in a by-election in 1753 after the death of James Noel. In 1754 he topped the poll in the contested election at Rutland. He married Elizabeth Chapman, daughter of William Chapman, gamekeeper at Exton and widow of his cousin Baptist Noel, 4th Earl of Gainsborough on 6 November 1756. At the 1761 election he topped the poll in the contest at Rutland again. After 1766 his attendance at parliament became irregular. He was returned unopposed at subsequent elections in 1768 and 1774. The Public Ledger wrote about him in 1779 “A very old Member of Parliament, and attends but very seldom. He is an independent man, and inclined to the minority.” He was returned at Rutland unopposed in 1780 and 1784.

== Later years and legacy ==
Noel died on 18 June 1788, aged 83.

Parliament of Great Britain
Preceded by Lord Finch; John Noel	Member of Parliament for Rutland; 1728–1741; With: Lord Finch; William Burton; James Noel	Succeeded by James Noel; John Finch
Preceded by James Noel; Lord Burghley	Member of Parliament for Rutland; 1753–1788; With: Lord Burghley; George Bridges Brudenell; Hon. Thomas Chambers Cecil; George Bridges Brudenell	Succeeded by Gerard Edwardes; George Bridges Brudenell
