= John Heathcote (died 1795) =

British Member of Parliament

John Heathcote FRS (c.1727 – 29 July 1795) was a British Member of Parliament.

He was born the second son of Sir John Heathcote, 2nd Baronet, of Normanton, Rutland, from whom he inherited estates at Steeple Gidding and Conington, Huntingdonshire in 1759. He studied law at Lincoln's Inn (1744).

He became a Fellow of the Royal Society on 12 May 1768.

He served as High Sheriff of Cambridgeshire and Huntingdonshire for 1767–68 and was the MP for Rutland from 29 June 1790 until his death.

He married Lydia Moyer (d. 14 August 1822) on 27 October 1764, they had two children:

- John Heathcote (14 November 1767 – 3 May 1838)
- Lydia Heathcote (d. 18 March 1848, York) married on 6 June 1811 William Henry Dawnay 6th Viscount Downe (d. 23 May 1846), they had two sons and a daughter.

John Heathcote is buried in Chingford Essex.

Parliament of Great Britain
| Preceded by George Bridges Brudenell; Gerard Edwardes | Member of Parliament for Rutland; 1790–1795; With: Gerard Edwardes | Succeeded by Philip Sherard; Gerard Edwardes |
