= Brownlow Cecil, 9th Earl of Exeter =

British peer and Member of Parliament

Brownlow Cecil, 9th Earl of Exeter (21 September 1725 – 26 December 1793), known as Lord Burghley from 1725 to 1754, was a British peer and Member of Parliament.

== Life ==
Exeter was the eldest son of Brownlow Cecil, 8th Earl of Exeter, and Hannah Sophia Chambers. He was educated at Winchester and St John's College, Cambridge. He was elected to the House of Commons for Rutland in 1747, a seat he held until 1754, when he succeeded his father in the earldom and entered the House of Lords. He also served as Lord Lieutenant of Rutland. As Lord Lieutenant he raised the Rutland Militia in 1759, but soon handed the command over to another officer.

Between 1755 and 1779, the 9th Earl employed Lancelot 'Capability' Brown to landscape the Burghley House Deer Park.

Lord Exeter died in December 1793, aged 68. He was childless and was succeeded in his titles by his nephew Henry, who was created Marquess of Exeter in 1801.

Parliament of Great Britain
Preceded by James Noel; John Finch	Member of Parliament for Rutland; 1747–1754; With: James Noel 1747–1752; Thomas Noel 1753–1754	Succeeded by Thomas Noel; George Bridges Brudenell
Honorary titles
Preceded by The Earl of Harborough	Lord Lieutenant of Rutland; 1751–1779	Succeeded by The Earl of Winchilsea
Peerage of England
Preceded by Brownlow Cecil	Earl of Exeter; 1754–1793	Succeeded by Henry Cecil
