= George Bridges Brudenell =

British politician

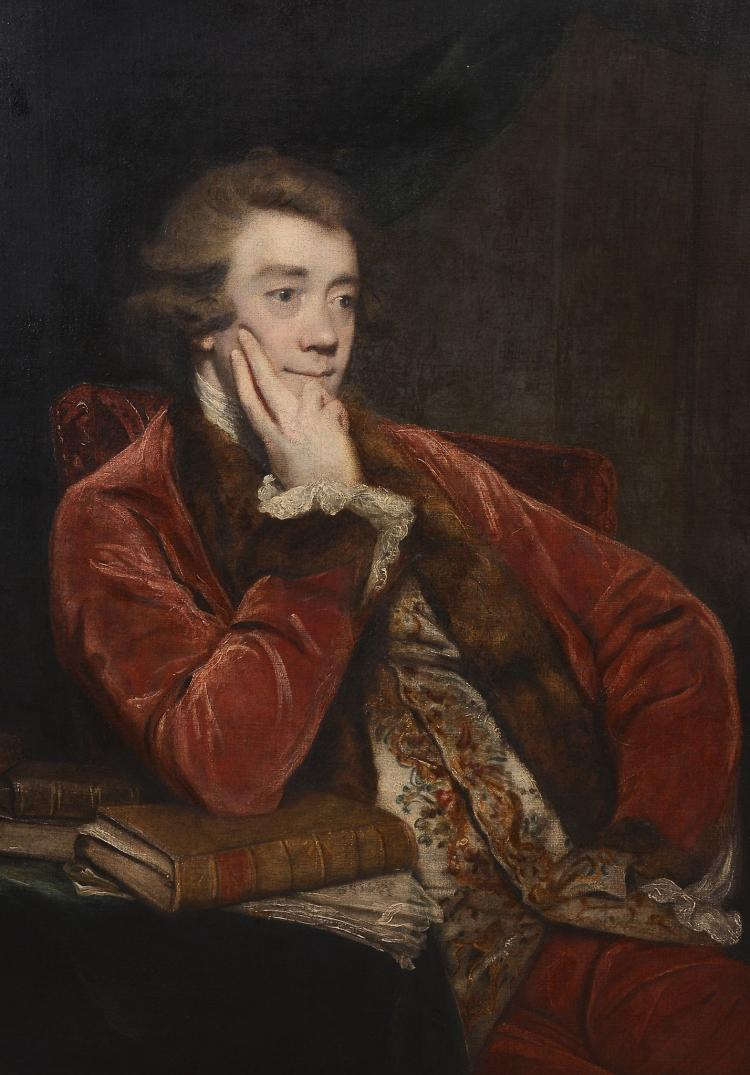
George Bridges Brudenell, 1759 portrait by Joshua Reynolds

George Bridges Brudenell (23 February 1726 – 1 February 1801) was a British politician who sat in the House of Commons for 36 years from 1754 to 1790.

== Early life ==
Brudenall was the son of James Brudenell MP and his wife Susanna Burton, daughter of Bartholomew Burton of North Luffenham, Rutland. He was educated at Hackney and was admitted at Peterhouse, Cambridge on 7 April 1743. He succeeded his father in 1746 and was equerry to King George II from 1746 to 1760.

== Political career ==
Brudenell's political career was effectively run by the Earl of Exeter. He was returned unopposed as Member of Parliament for Rutland in a by-election in 1754. In 1756, he received a secret service pension of £500 per year. When King George III came to the throne in 1760, he was offered the renewal of his place as equerry, but did not press to take it. Because Exeter wanted to place his brother at Rutland at the next election Brudenell was transferred to Stamford for the 1761 general election where he was returned unopposed.

When the Militia was revived in 1759, the Earl of Exeter, as Lord Lieutenant of Rutland, appointed Brudenell to command the two-company Rutland Militia. He was appointed clerk comptroller of the Household in July 1765 and held the post until 1768. At the 1768 general election he returned to Rutland where he became MP without opposition. He was appointed Clerk of the Green Cloth in 1768 and held the post until it was abolished in March 1782. He was returned unopposed for Rutland in the subsequent elections in 1774, 1780 and 1784. He did not stand in 1790. There is no record of his having spoken in the House

== Later life and legacy ==
Brudenell died on 1 February 1801.

Parliament of Great Britain
Preceded by Thomas Noel; Lord Burghley	Member of Parliament for Rutland; 1754–1761; With: Thomas Noel	Succeeded by Thomas Noel; Hon. Thomas Chambers Cecil
Preceded by John Harvey-Thursby; Robert Barbor	Member of Parliament for Stamford; 1761–1768; With: John Chaplin; George René Aufrère	Succeeded by George René Aufrère; Lieutenant-General (Sir) George Howard
Preceded by Thomas Noel; Hon. Thomas Chambers Cecil	Member of Parliament for Rutland; 1768–1790; With: Thomas Noel; Gerard Edwardes	Succeeded by Gerard Edwardes; John Heathcote
