= John Noel (1702–1728) =

British politician

John Noel (1702–1728) was a British politician who sat in the House of Commons between 1727 and 1728.

Noel was the son of Hon. John Noel and his wife Elizabeth Sherard, daughter of Bennet Sherard, 2nd Baron Sherard and was born on 15 December 1702. He succeeded his father in 1718.

Noel was returned unopposed as Member of Parliament for Rutland at the 1727 general election. He died four months later on 6 January 1728. He was succeeded by his brother Thomas.

Parliament of Great Britain
Preceded by Lord Finch; Sir Thomas Mackworth	Member of Parliament for Rutland; 1727–1728; With: Lord Finch	Succeeded by Lord Finch; Thomas Noel
