= Sir Gerard Noel, 2nd Baronet =

British politician (1759-1838)

Sir Gerard Noel Noel, 2nd Baronet
- Born: 17 July 1759
- Died: 25 February 1838 (aged 78)
- Education: Eton College
- Alma mater: St John's College, Cambridge
- Occupations: Aristocrat, politician
- Spouse: 3
- Children: 19
- Parent(s): Gerald Edwards; Lady Jane Noel
- Relatives: Baptist Noel, 4th Earl of Gainsborough (maternal grandfather)

Sir Gerard Noel Noel, 2nd Baronet (17 July 1759 – 25 February 1838), of Welham Grove in Leicestershire and Exton Park in Rutland, known as Gerard Edwards (or Edwardes) until 1798, was an English Member of Parliament.

== Background ==
Gerard Noel was born Gerard Noel Edwardes at Tickencote, Rutland, on 17 July 1759. He was the son of Gerald Edwards of Welham Grove and Lady Jane Noel, daughter of Baptist Noel, 4th Earl of Gainsborough. His father was the illegitimate son of the tycoon Mary Edwardes and Lord Anne Hamilton, younger son of James Hamilton, 4th Duke of Hamilton. He was educated at Eton and St John's College, Cambridge.

== Career ==
Noel became partner in a Westminster banking house. He entered Parliament in 1784 as member for Maidstone. However, on the death of his cousin, Thomas Noel, MP for Rutland, he resigned so as to be elected for that county (where the Noels had regularly held one of the seats for centuries). He represented Rutland (in two spells) for well over forty years. Initially a supporter of Pitt the Younger, he was one of a group of MPs who in 1788 tried to form a third party independent of both Pitt and Charles James Fox; in later years, however, he was a consistent Tory.

In 1798 he inherited the estates of his uncle, Henry Noel, 6th Earl of Gainsborough (though not the peerage, which could not pass through the female line), and changed his surname to Noel by royal licence. He served as High Sheriff of Rutland for 1812.

== Personal life and death ==
Noel married three times. His first marriage, in 1780, was to Diana Middleton (d. 1823), daughter of Captain Charles Middleton, the Comptroller of the Navy. The following year Middleton was created a baronet, with a special remainder to his new son-in-law should he have no sons of his own. Middleton later became First Lord of the Admiralty and was raised to a peerage as Lord Barham with a special remainder for the barony to his daughter. Lord Barham died on 17 June 1813 without male issue, and Noel consequently inherited his baronetcy, while Noel's wife inherited the peerage. They had eighteen children:

- Charles Noel Noel (1781–1866), MP, who succeeded to his mother's barony and his father's baronetcy, later created Earl of Gainsborough
- Rev. Gerard Thomas Noel (1782–1851), a canon of Winchester, and father of Caroline Maria Noel (1817–77), author of the hymn "At the Name of Jesus".
- Major Horace Noel (1783–1807)
- Henry Robert Noel (1784–1800)
- William Middleton Noel (1789–1859), MP for Rutland 1838-1840
- Captain Frederic Noel (1790–1833), a naval officer
- Rev. Francis James Noel (1793–1854), Rector of Teston and Nettlestead in Kent
- Berkeley Octavius Noel (1794–1841)
- Rev. Leland Noel (1797–1870), Vicar of Exton and Rector of Horn
- Baptist Wriothesley Noel (1799–1873)
- Louisa Elizabeth Noel (d. 1816), who married the banker William Henry Hoare (d. 1819)
- Emma Noel (d. 1873), who married Stafford O'Brien (d. 1864)
- Charlotte Margaret Noel (d. 1869), who married (first, in 1813) Thomas Welman and (second, in 1839) Thomas Thompson
- Augusta Julia Noel (d. 1833), who married Thomas Babington (d. 1871)
- Juliana Hicks Noel (d. 1855), who married Rev. Samuel Phillips

His second marriage, in 1823, was to Harriet Gill (d. 1826), his mistress of many years, by whom he had a daughter, Harriet Jane (m. Don Ysidro Lopez d'Arze).

After Harriet's death he married a third time, in 1831, to Isabella Evans.

Noel died on 25 February 1838.

== See also ==
- Catmose House

Parliament of Great Britain
Preceded by Clement Taylor; Sir Horatio Mann, Bt	Member of Parliament for Maidstone; 1784–1788; With: Clement Taylor	Succeeded by Clement Taylor; Sir Matthew Bloxham
Preceded by George Bridges Brudenell; Thomas Noel	Member of Parliament for Rutland; 1788–1800; With: George Bridges Brudenell 1788–1790; John Heathcote 1790–1795; Lord Sherard 1795–1796; Sir William Lowther, Bt 1796–1800	Succeeded by Parliament of the United Kingdom
Parliament of the United Kingdom
Preceded by Parliament of Great Britain	Member of Parliament for Rutland; 1801–1808; With: Sir William Lowther, Bt 1801–1802; The Lord Carbery 1802–1805; The Lord Henniker 1805–1808	Succeeded by Charles Noel; The Lord Henniker
Preceded by Charles Noel; Sir Gilbert Heathcote, Bt	Member of Parliament for Rutland; 1814–1838; With: Sir Gilbert Heathcote, Bt	Succeeded by William Noel; Sir Gilbert Heathcote, Bt
Baronetage of Great Britain
Preceded by Charles Middleton	Baronet (of The Navy); 1813–1838	Succeeded by Charles Noel Noel
