= Daniel Finch, 8th Earl of Winchilsea =

British politician

The Right Honourable The Earl of Winchilsea KG PC
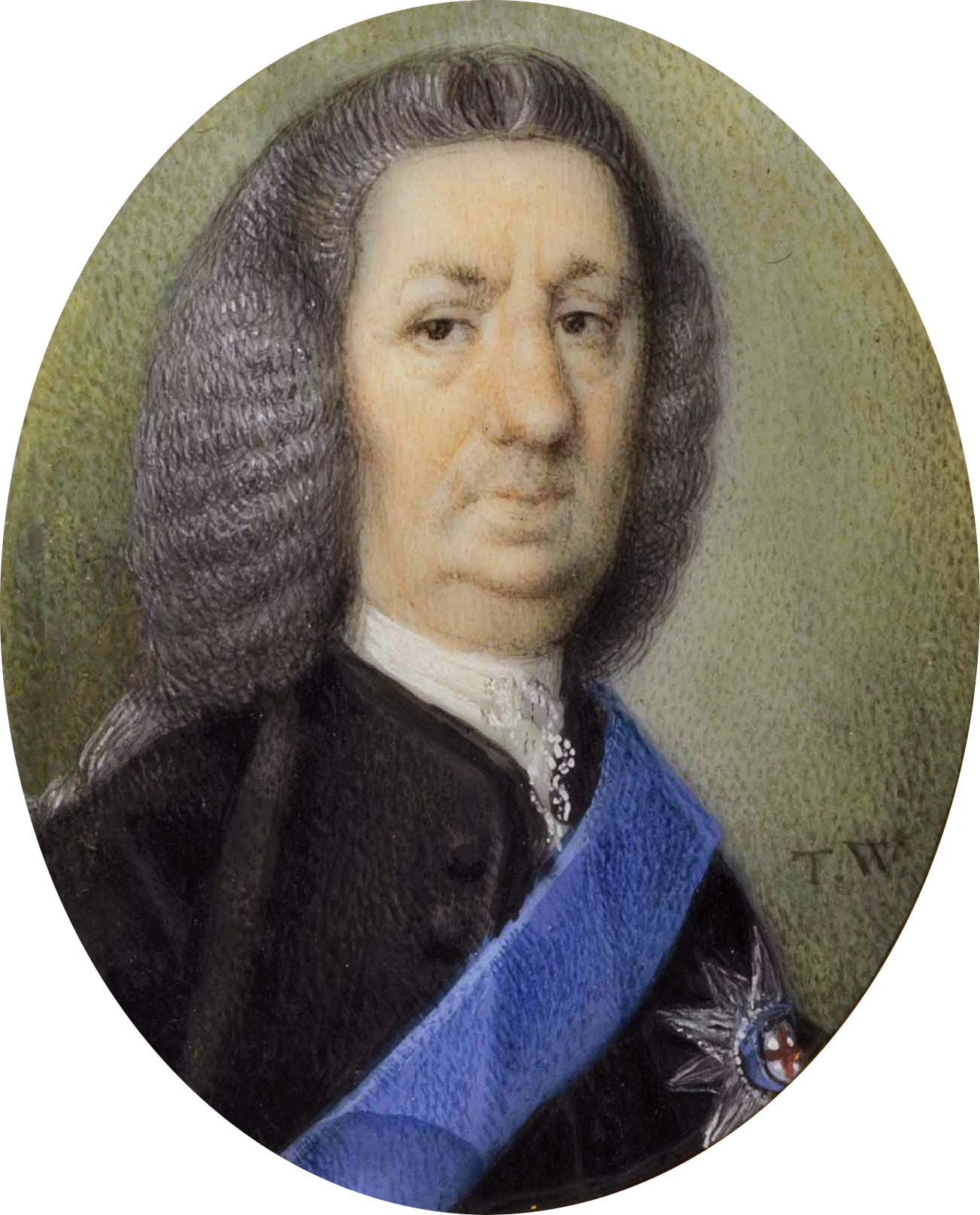
- Portrait by Thomas Worlidge

Lord President of the Council
- In office 12 July 1765 – 30 July 1766
- Monarch: George III
- Prime Minister: The Marquess of Rockingham
- Preceded by: The Duke of Bedford
- Succeeded by: The Earl of Northington

Member of the England Parliament for Rutland
- Preceded by: Richard Halford; Philip Sherard
- Succeeded by: William Burton; Thomas Noel

Personal details
- Born: Daniel Finch; 24 May 1689
- Died: 2 August 1769 (aged 80)
- Resting place: Eastwell, Kent, England
- Spouses: Frances Feilding; Mary Palmer
- Children: 9 daughters
- Parents: Daniel Finch, 2nd Earl of Nottingham; Anne Hatton

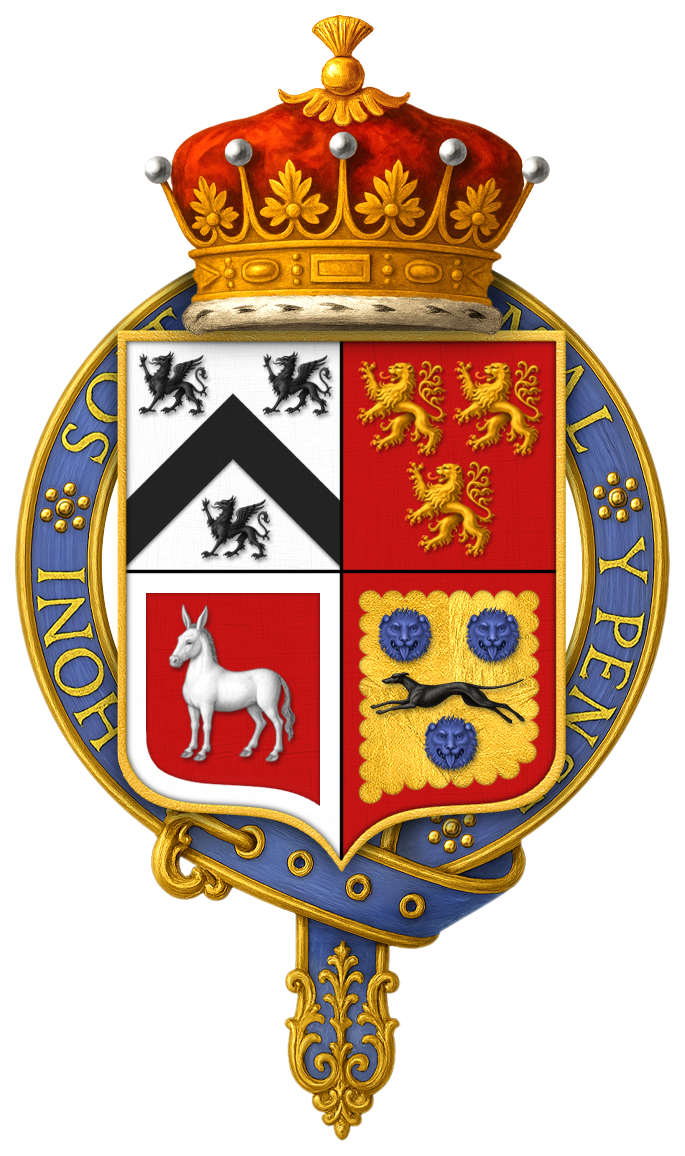
Quartered arms of Daniel Finch, 8th Earl of Winchilsea, KG, PC

Daniel Finch, 8th Earl of Winchilsea, KG, PC (24 May 1689 – 2 August 1769) was a British politician.

== Origins ==
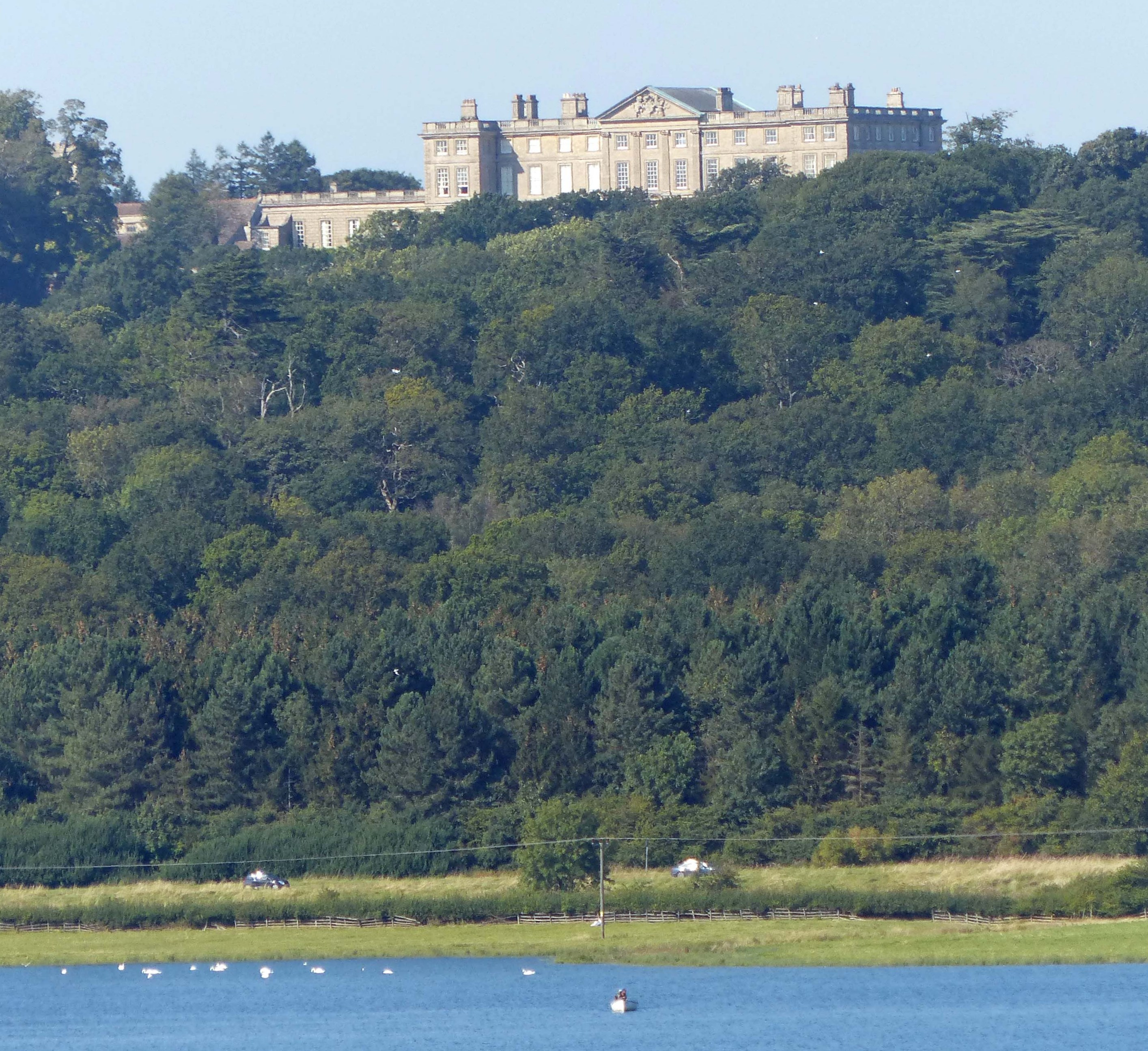
Burley on the hill House from Rutland waters

Styled by the courtesy title Lord Finch until 1730, he was the eldest son and heir of Daniel Finch, 2nd Earl of Nottingham of Burley, by his second wife Anne Hatton, a daughter of Christopher Hatton, 1st Viscount Hatton. His father was a prominent Tory politician who had been one of the few leading Tories to actively support the Hanoverian succession.

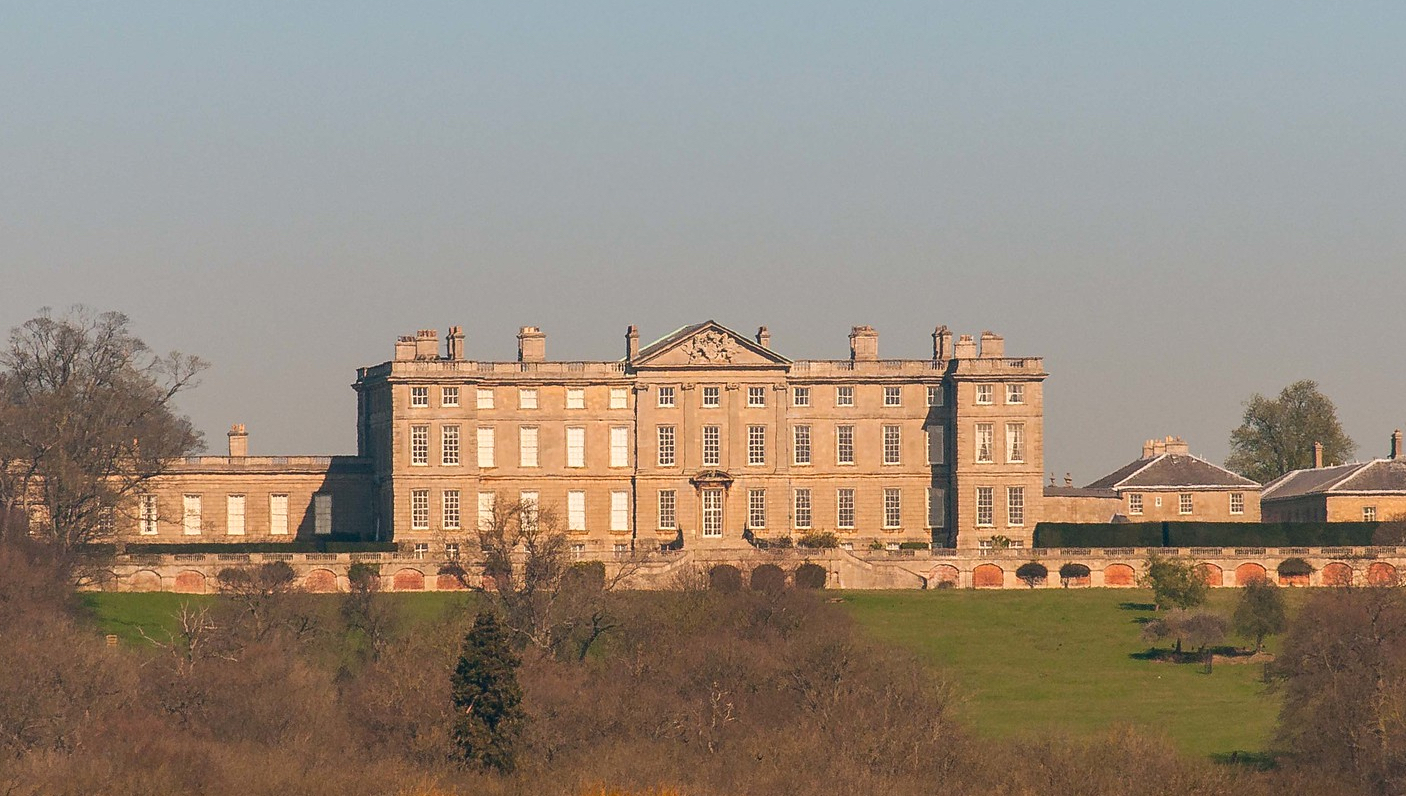
Burley on the hill House near Oakham in Rutland, built in the 1690s by Daniel Finch, 2nd Earl of Nottingham

== Career ==
In 1710 he was elected (as Lord Finch and aged 21), as a Member of Parliament for Rutland and served as Comptroller of the Royal Household from 1725 to 1730. He held the seat until he succeeded to the Earldom in 1730 (necessitating his move to the House of Lords). In 1739 he supported the founding of the Foundling Hospital in London, a charity providing home and education for some of the capital's many abandoned children, and was one of the original governors.

Although his father had been a supporter of Walpole, Winchilsea became instead a supporter of Lord Carteret in the so-called "Patriot Opposition". When Carteret became leading minister in 1742, Winchilsea joined him, becoming First Lord of the Admiralty (1742–1744). Later on, he allied himself with the Duke of Newcastle and the Old Whigs, and served as Lord President of the Council in the Rockingham (his nephew) administration (1765–1766). He was made a Knight of the Garter in 1752.

== Marriages & issue ==
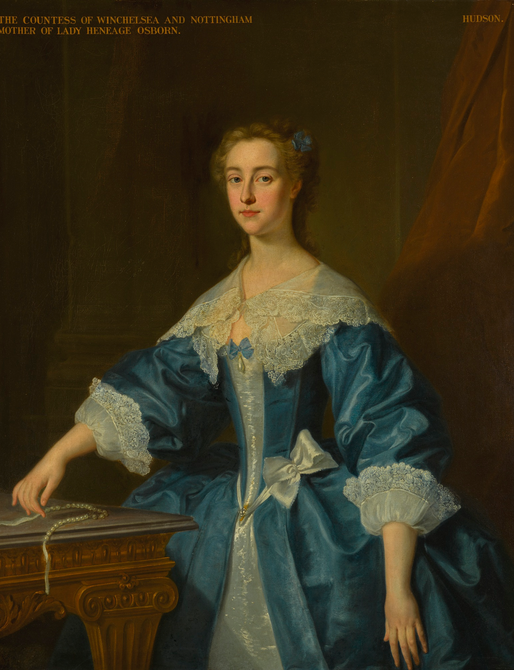
Mary Palmer, Countess of Winchilsea and Nottingham (c. 1712–57), portrait by Enoch Seeman

He married twice but failed to produce male issue:

- Firstly to Lady Frances Feilding, a daughter of Basil Feilding, 4th Earl of Denbigh by his wife Hester Firebrace, by whom he had one daughter:
  - Lady Charlotte Finch, who died unmarried.
- Secondly he married Mary Palmer, second daughter and co-heiress of Sir Thomas Palmer, 4th Baronet of Wingham, by his wife Elizabeth Marsham, a sister of Robert Marsham, 1st Baron Romney and a daughter of Sir Robert Marsham, 4th Baronet. By his second wife he had eight daughters, only four of whom survived to adulthood, Heneage, Essex, Hatton and Augusta:
  - Lady Mary Finch (b. 7 December 1739);
  - Lady Frances Finch (b. 24 October 1740);
  - Lady Heneage Finch (1 December 1741 –1820), who in 1788 married (as his second wife) Maj.-Gen. Sir George Osborn, 4th Baronet;
  - Lady Anne Finch (b. 9 June 1743);
  - Lady Georgina Finch (b. 10 July 1744);
  - Lady Essex Finch (b. 1 January 1746);
  - Lady Hatton Finch (23 February 1747 –1829), who died unmarried;
  - Lady Augusta Elizabeth Finch (14 February 1751 –1797), who died unmarried.
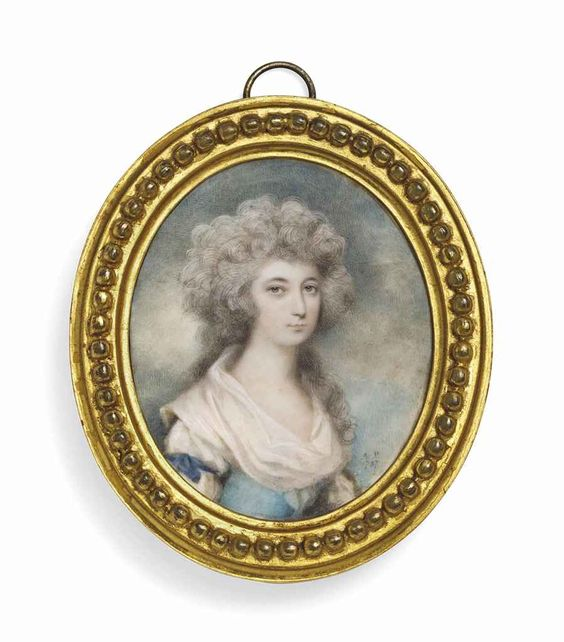
    Lady Heneage Finch (1741-1820) later Osborn by Andrew Plimer, 1787

The Countess of Winchilsea's sister was Anne Palmer, who was married to the 8th Earl of Winchilsea's youngest brother, Hon. Edward Finch (later Finch-Hattons), making their children double first cousins, the title later went to their grandson, George Finch-Hatton, 10th Earl of Winchilsea.

== Death & burial ==
He died in 1769 and was buried at Eastwell Church, near his residence. As he died without male issue his titles, together with his estates at Burley and elsewhere, passed to his nephew George Finch, 9th Earl of Winchilsea, the son of his brother the diplomat William Finch. He left his Kentish properties, including Eastwell Park, to his other nephew George Finch-Hatton, son of his brother Edward Finch.

Parliament of Great Britain
Preceded by Richard Halford; The Earl of Harborough	Member of Parliament for Rutland; 1710–1730; With: John Noel 1710–1711, 1715–1719; Richard Halford 1711–1713; The Lord Sherard 1713–1715; Marquess of Granby 1719–1721; Sir Thomas Mackworth, Bt 1721–1727; John Noel 1727–1728; Thomas Noel 1728–1730	Succeeded by William Burton; Thomas Noel
Political offices
Preceded by Paul Methuen	Comptroller of the Household; 1725–1730	Succeeded by Sir Conyers Darcy
Preceded by Sir Charles Wager	First Lord of the Admiralty; 1742–1744	Succeeded by The Duke of Bedford
Preceded by The Earl Temple	First Lord of the Admiralty; 1757	Succeeded by The Lord Anson
Preceded by The Duke of Bedford	Lord President of the Council; 1765–1766	Succeeded by The Earl of Northington
Honorary titles
Preceded by The Duke of Newcastle	Senior Privy Counsellor; 1768–1769	Succeeded by The Duke of Queensberry and Dover
Peerage of England
Preceded by Daniel Finch	Earl of Winchilsea; 1730–1769	Succeeded by George Finch
Preceded by Daniel Finch	Earl of Nottingham; 7th creation 1730–1769	Succeeded by George Finch
