= Assize of Arms of 1252 =

Proclamation of King Henry III of England

The Assize of Arms of 1252, also called the Ordinance of 1252, was a proclamation of King Henry III of England concerning the enforcement of the Assize of Arms of 1181, and the appointment of constables to summon men to arms, quell breaches of the peace, and to deliver offenders to the sheriff. British historian, F. M. Powicke identified that it was actually issued on 12 May 1242, but was subsequently transcribed incorrectly.

Along with the Ordinance of 1233 that required the appointment of watchmen, the appointment of constables has been cited as one of the earliest creation of the English police, as has the Statute of Westminster 1285 (13 Edw. 1. St. 1).

Stubbs saw the significance of the writ of ordinance as the bringing together of two separate but long-standing modes of ensuring peace and defence, expanding the 1181 Assize of Arms by adding the system of watch and ward, and pointing the way forward to subsequent legislation along similar lines by Edward I and Henry IV.

== See also ==
- Assize of Arms of 1181
- History of law enforcement in the United Kingdom

== Bibliography ==
- Clarkson, Charles Tempest; Richardson, J. Hall (1889). Police!. ISBN 9780824062163. OCLC 60726408.
- Pollock, Frederick; Maitland, Frederic William (1898). The History of English Law Before the Time of Edward I. Vol. 1 (2 ed.). ISBN 978-1-58477-718-2.
- Delbrück, Hans (1990). Renfroe, Walter J. Jr (ed.). Medieval Warfare. History of the Art of War. Vol. 3. ISBN 0-8032-6585-9.
- Rich, Robert M. (1977). Essays on the Theory and Practice of Criminal Justice. ISBN 978-0-8191-0235-5. "The origin of the exception goes back in English history to the Ordinance of 1233 which instituted night-watchmen, and directed them 'to arrest those who enter vills at night and go about armed.' Later the Ordinance of 1252 mentions 'disturbers of our peace.'"
- Powicke, F.W. (1942). ‘The Writ for Enforcing Watch and Ward, 1242’, The English Historical Review, Vol LVII, Issue CCXXVIII. ISSN 0013-8266.
