= Assize of Arms of 1181 =

Proclamation of all freemen in England

The Assize of Arms of 1181 was a proclamation of King Henry II of England concerning the obligation of all freemen of England to possess and bear arms in the service of king and realm and to swear allegiance to the king, on pain of "vengeance, not merely on their lands or chattels, but on their limbs". The assize stipulated precisely the military equipment that each man should have according to his rank and wealth. The assize effectively revived the old Anglo-Saxon fyrd duty. The Assize established restrictions on terms of inheritance along with prohibiting exports of arms, ships and timber. It also prohibited the ownership of chainmail armour by English Jews and directed them to make such armour available to non-Jews for "the king's service".

Every knight was forced to arm himself with a coat of mail, and shield and lance; every freeholder with lance and hauberk, every burgess and poorer freeman with lance and an iron helmet. This universal levy of the armed nation was wholly at the disposal of the king for defense. ... By his Assize of Arms Henry restored the Ancient Anglo-Saxon Militia System, and supplied the requisite counterbalance to the military power of the great feudatories, which, notwithstanding the temptation to avoid service by payment of scutage, they were still able and too willing to maintain.

— Early Plantagenets

In all these measures (Assize of Arms, &c.) we may trace one main object, the strengthening of the Royal power, and one main means, or directing principle—the doing so by increasing the safety and security of the people. Whatever was done to help the people, served to reduce the power of the great feudal baronage, to disarm their forces, to abolish their jurisdictions, to diminish their chances of tyranny.

— Thomas Haughton

== Text of the Assize of Arms ==
The Act reads as follows:

THE ASSIZE OF ARMS (1181)
1. Whoever possesses one knight's fee shall have a shirt of mail, a helmet, a shield, and a lance; and every knight shall have as many shirts of mail, helmets, shields, and lances as he possesses knight's fees in demesne. (Note: That is to say, as many knights as remain charged against his demesne; cf. no. 36.)
2. Moreover, every free layman who possesses chattels or rents to the value of 16 marks shall have a shirt of mail, a helmet, a shield, and a lance; and every free layman possessing chattels or rents to the value of 10 marks shall have a hauberk, an iron cap, and a lance. (Note: Presumably less elaborate armor than that required of the other group.)
3. Item, all burgesses and the whole community of freemen shall have [each] a gambeson, (Note: Padded textile armour.) an iron cap and a lance.
4. Besides, each of them shall swear to have these arms before the feast of St. Hilary, to be faithful to the lord king Henry — namely, the son of the Empress Matilda — and to bear these arms in his service according to his command and in fealty to the lord king and his kingdom. And henceforth no one having these arms shall sell them or pledge them or lend them or alienate them in any other way; nor shall a lord in any way alienate them from his men, either through forfeiture or through gift or a pledge or in any other way.
5. If anyone having these arms die, his arms shall remain to his heir. If, however, the heir is not of age to use arms in time of need, that person who has wardship over him shall also have custody of the arms and shall find a man who can use the arms in the service of the lord king until the heir is of age to bear arms, and then he shall have them.
6. Any burgess who has more arms than he ought to have by this assize shall sell them or give them away, or in some way alienate them to such a man as will keep them for the service of the lord king of England. And none of them shall keep more arms than he ought to have by this assize.
7. Item, no Jew shall keep in his possession a shirt of mail or a hauberk, but he shall sell it or give it away or alienate it in some other way so that it shall remain in the king's service.
8. Item, no one shall carry arms out of England except by the command of the lord king: no one is to sell arms to another to carry out of England; nor shall a merchant or any other man carry them out of England.
9. Item, the justices shall have [a report] sworn by lawful knights, or by other free and lawful men of the hundreds and neighborhoods and boroughs — as many as they see fit to employ — as to what persons possess chattels to the amount that they should have a shirt of mail, a helmet, a lance, and a shield according to what has been provided; so that they shall separately name for those [justices] all men of their hundreds and neighborhoods and boroughs who are worth 16m. in either chattels or rents and likewise, those who are worth 10 marks. And then the justices shall have written down [the names of] all those jurors and other men, [recording] how much in chattels or rents they [each] have and what arms, according to the value of the chattels or rents, they should [each] have. Then, in their presence and a common assembly of those men, they shall have read this assize regarding the possession of arms, and they shall have that men swear to have arms according to the value of the aforesaid chattels or rents and to keep them for the service of the lord king according to this aforesaid assize, under the command of and in fealty to the lord king Henry and his kingdom. If, moreover, it should happen that any one of them, who ought to have these arms, is not in the county during the period when the justices are in that county, the justices shall set a time for him [to appear] before them in another county. And if he does not come to them in any county through which they are to go, and is not in that land [at all], they shall set him time at Westminster toward the octave of St. Michael; so that, as he loves his life and all that he has, he shall be there forswearing his oath. And they shall command him, before the aforesaid feast of St. Hilary, to have arms according to the obligation resting on him.
10. Item, the justices shall have proclamation made in the counties through which they are to go that, concerning those who do not have such arms as have been specified above, the lord king will take vengeance, not merely on their lands or chattels, but their limbs.
11. Item, no one who does not possess 16 marks [as specified above] or 10 marks in chattels is to swear concerning free and lawful men.
12. Item, the justices shall command through all the counties that no one, as he loves his life and all that he has, shall buy or sell any ship to be taken away from England, and that no one shall carry any timber or cause it to be carried out of England. And the lord king commands that no one shall be received for the oath concerning arms unless he is a freeman.

== Background ==
The Norman invasion of 1066 led to the introduction to England of a very structural form of feudalism. This was a strong social hierarchy with the king at its apex with most people owing fealty to another. The Norman, Anglo-Saxon and Viking armies had been very loose gatherings of fighting men, and looting and pillage was common among them, and therefore, as far as their kings were concerned, these forces had only loose loyalties to them.

The power of the Norman kings ruling at that time in England was not founded therefore on any form of standing army. If a king needed to raise forces this would often have to be mercenary or professional forces paid for by the king or his followers. The Assize of Arms needs to be seen in this context. Although it did not create a standing army in the modern sense, it did lay down conditions which would enable the King to call up a fighting force at any time without the need for any formal form of taxation, which would be adequately armed to preserve social order within the country or to ward off any external threats.

== Connection to the English and American Bills of Rights ==
Some in the United States have claimed that the Assize of Arms is an ancient right to bear arms, though this claim is disputed, noting that the Assize of Arms was an obligation, not a right (i.e., a choice). The Supreme Court of the United States ruling in District of Columbia v. Heller regarding the right to bear arms referred only to the English Bill of Rights of 1689 as precedent.

Some have asserted that the Assize of Arms is part of the legal basis for the English Bill of Rights and the right to keep and bear arms mentioned in the United States Bill of Rights (specifically in the Second Amendment to the United States Constitution).

The Assize of Arms did not describe an ancient legal or political individual right to arms, rather the Assize of Arms represented an imposed responsibility on subjects.

The Supreme Court of the United States in District of Columbia v. Heller was presented by the petitioners with written evidence that the Assize of Arms merely marked the beginning of the militia system in England. It claimed that a lower court's citation of the English Bill of Rights of 1689 as a source of a preexisting right had "misinterpreted it to guarantee a private right to possess guns, when it rather laid down the right of a class of citizens, Protestants, to take part in the military affairs of the realm. Nowhere was an individual’s right to arm in self-defense guaranteed." The court's final judgment on the right to bear arms concluded that the writers of the second amendment had intended to create such a right, based on the early settlers' experience and on the English Bill of Rights. However, the court made no judgment on whether the right dated back to the Assize of Arms.

== See also ==
- Assize of Arms of 1252
- History of law enforcement in the United Kingdom
- Statute of Winchester (1285)
