= High Sheriff of Rutland =

List of sheriffs and high sheriffs of the English county of Rutland

This is a list of sheriffs and high sheriffs of the English county of Rutland.

The sheriff is the oldest secular office under the Crown: there has been a Sheriff of Rutland since 1129. Formerly the sheriff was the principal law enforcement officer in the county but over the centuries most of the responsibilities associated with the post have been transferred elsewhere or are now defunct, so that its functions are now largely ceremonial. Under the provisions of the Local Government Act 1972, on 1 April 1974 the office previously known as sheriff was retitled high sheriff. The high sheriff changes every March.

After some 22 years as part of Leicestershire, Rutland was split away in 1996 as a unitary authority with its own shrievalty, thus establishing the separate High Sheriff of Rutland.

== Sheriffs ==
=== 1100–1200 ===
- 1129: William de Albeni, the Breton
- 1155: Richard de Humez
- 1156: Thomas Ondeby
- 1157: Robert filius Goboldi
- 1159: Richard de Humez
- 1161: Robert filius Goboldi
- 1163: Richard de Humez
- 1165: Robert Goebold
- 1166: Richard de Humez
- 1179: William Malduit
- 1188: Amalric Dispensator (Despenser)
- 1189: William Malduit
- 1195: William de Albeni
- 1198: Benedict de Haveresham
- 1199: Hugh le Scot

=== 1200–1300 ===
- 1200–1205: Robert Malduit
- 1205–1211: Ralph Normanville
- 1211–1217: Robert of Braybrooke and Henry of Braybrooke
- 1215–1224: Falkes de Breauté
- 1218–1228: Alan Basset
- 1228–1254: Jeffery de Rokingham
- 1254–1259: Ralph de Greneham
- 1259–1272: Anketyn de Markinal
- 1272–1281: Peter Wakerville and William Bovile
- 1281–1289: Alberic de Whitleber
- 1289–1300: Edmund, 2nd Earl of Cornwall

=== 1300–1400 ===
- 1300–1301: John Burley
- 1302–1312: Margaret, widow of Edmund, 2nd Earl of Cornwall
- 1313–1316: Margaret, widow of Piers Gaveston
- 1316–1318: Hugh de Audley, 1st Baron Audley
- 1321: Ivo de Aldeburgh
- 1322–1327: Edmund of Woodstock, 1st Earl of Kent
- 1327–1347: Hugh de Audley, 1st Baron Audley (died in office 1347)
- 1349–1360: William de Bohun, 1st Earl of Northampton (died in office 1360)
- 1360–1365: William Wade
- 1365–1373: Humphrey de Bohun, 7th Earl of Hereford (died in office 1363)
- 1374–1376: John Wittleborough of Whissendine and Milton and Marholm, Northants
- 1376–1377: Simon Ward
- 1378: John Wittleborough of Whissendine and Milton and Marholm, Northants
- 1379: Sir Thomas de Burton, Kt.
- 1380: John Basings
- 1381: William Moorwood
- 1382: John Wittleborough of Whissendine and Milton and Marholm, Northants
- 1383: William Flore (or Flower)
- 1384: Walter Skarles of Uppingham
- 1385: Sir John de Calveley of Stapleford, Leics. and Teigh
- 1386–1387: Robert de Vere
- 1388: John Wittleborough of Whissendine and Milton and Marholm, Northants
- 1388: Walter Skarles of Uppingham
- 1389: Sir John de Calveley of Stapleford, Leics. and Teigh
- 1390–1397: Edward, Earl of Rutland
- 1397–1399: Thomas Onderley
- 1399: John Wittleborough of Whissendine and Milton and Marholm, Northants

=== 1400–1500 ===
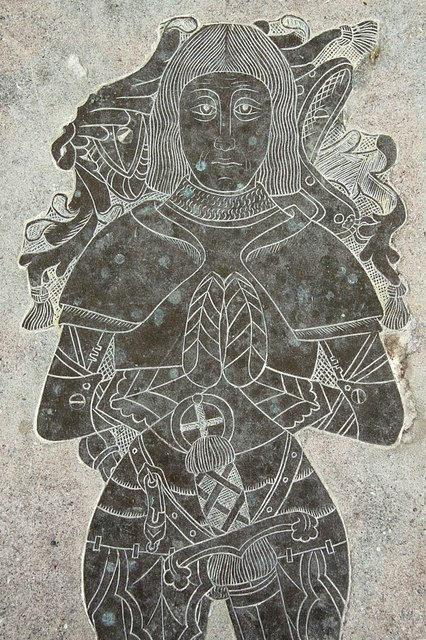
Brass of Geoffrey Sherard, Sheriff 1468, 1480 and 1484, in St Mary Magdalene's Church, Stapleford

- 1400: John Pensax of Oakham
- 1401: Roland Senliz or Sinluce
- 1402: John Arblaster
- 1404: Thomas Thorpe of Pilton
- 1405: John Basynges
- 1405: John Daneys ( probably acted till Michaelmas 1407)
- 1407: Roger Flore of Oakham
- 1408: Thomas Oudeby of Stoke Dry and Hathern, Leics.
- 1409: John Clerk
- 1410: William Greneham
- 1411: Thomas Corby
- 1411: Sir Thomas Burton of Tolethorpe Hall and Little Casterton (1st term)
- 1411: Thomas Corby
- 1412: Roger Flore of Oakham
- 1413: Thomas Oudeby of Stoke Dry and Hathern, Leics.
- 1415: James Bellers
- 1416: John Boyvill
- 1416: Sir Thomas Burton of Tolethorpe Hall and Little Casterton (2nd term)
- 1417: Robert Browe of Teigh and Woodhead
- 1418: Robert Chisleden of Braunston
- 1419: John Pensax of Oakham
- 1420: James Bellers of Melton Mowbray and Somerby, Leics.(died 1421)
- 1421: Sir Thomas Burton, Kt.
- 1422: Sir Thomas Burton, Kt.
- 1424: John Onderby
- 1425: John Davies
- 1426: John Colepeper of Isham, Northants. and Exton Hall
- 1427: Sir Henry Plessington of Burley
- 1428: Sir Thomas Burton of Tolethorpe Hall and Little Casterton (3rd term)
- 1429: John Denys
- 1430: John Colepeper of Isham, Northants. and Exton Hall
- 1431: Thomas Flore (1st term)
- 1432: Sir Henry Plessington of Burley
- 1433: John Boyvill
- 1434: William Beaufo
- 1435: Robert Davies and John Pilton
- 1436: John Branspath
- 1437: Hugo Boyvill
- 1438: Laurence Sherard
- 1439: William Beaufo
- 1440: Thomas Burton (son of 1417)
- 1441: Sir Henry Plessington of Burley
- 1442: Thomas Flore (2nd term)
- 1443: William Beaufo
- 1444: Thomas Berkeley
- 1445: John Basings
- 1446: William Walker
- 1447: John Boyvill
- 1448: William Haseldon
- 1449: Hugo Boyvill
- 1450: Robert Fenne
- 1451: Thomas Flore (3rd term)
- 1452: William Heton
- 1453: Robert Sherard
- 1454: Robert Fenne
- 1455: William Beaufo
- 1456: William Haselden
- 1457: Thomas Flore (4th term)
- 1458: Thomas Dale
- 1459: Robert Fenne
- 1460: Everard Digby (died Towton, 1461)
- 1461: John Francis
- 1462–1463: Thomas Palmer
- 1464: William Greenham
- 1465: Thomas Flore (5th term)
- 1466: Richard Sapcote
- 1467: William Browne
- 1468: Geoffrey Sherard
- 1469: John Dale
- 1470: Thomas Flore (6th term)
- 1471: Brian Talbot
- 1472: Thomas Berkeley
- 1473: William Haselden
- 1474: John Pilton
- 1475: William Browne
- 1476: John Sapcote
- 1477: David Malpas
- 1478: Henry Mackworth
- 1479: John Pilton
- 1480: Geoffrey Sherard
- 1481: William Palmer
- 1482: David Malpas
- 1483: William Browne
- 1484: Geoffrey Sherard
- 1485: John Pilton
- 1486: Everard Digby of Tilton and Drystoke
- 1487: William Browne
- 1488: David Malpas
- 1489: Maurice Berkley
- 1490: Thomas Sapcote
- 1491: John Digby
- 1492: Robert Harrington of Ridlington
- 1493: Christopher Browne
- 1494: John Pilton
- 1495: Thomas Sherard
- 1496: Thomas Sapcots
- 1497: George Mackworth
- 1498: Robert Harrington of Ridlington
- 1499: Everard Digby of Tilton and Drystoke

=== 1500–1600 ===
- 1500: John Chiselden
- 1501: Christopher Browne
- 1502: John Digby
- 1503: John Harrington
- 1504: Maurive Berkley
- 1505: William Pole
- 1506: Thomas Sherard
- 1507: Richard Flowre
- 1508: John Coly
- 1509: Everard Fielding of Martinsthorpe
- 1510: Christopher Browne
- 1511: Edward Sapcote of Burley
- 1512: George Mackworth
- 1513: John Harrington
- 1514: Everard Digby of Tilton, Leics. and Stoke Dry
- 1515: Thomas Brokesby
- 1516: John Caldecott
- 1517: John Harrington
- 1518: John Digby
- 1519: Everard Digby of Tilton, Leics. and Stoke Dry
- 1520: William Fielding
- 1521: Sir John Harrington Jnr
- 1522: John Harrington of Ridlington
- 1523: George Mackworth
- 1524: John Digby
- 1525: Francis Browne of Tolethorpe Hall and Little Casterton.
- 1526: John Caldecot
- 1527: William Fielding
- 1528: Edward Sapcote of Burley
- 1529: Everard Digby of Tilton, Leics. and Stoke Dry
- 1530: Edward Catesby
- 1531: George Mackworth
- 1532: Edward Sapcote of Burley
- 1533: Everard Digby of Tilton, Leics. and Stoke Dry
- 1534: Sir John Harrington
- 1535: George Mackworth
- 1536: Edward Sapcote of Burley
- 1537: Andrew Nowell
- 1538: Thomas Brudenell
- 1539: Francis Mackworth
- 1540: Richard Cecil
- 1541: Sir John Harrington
- 1542: Kenelm Digby of Stoke Dry
- 1543: Edward Sapcote of Burley
- 1544: Francis Mackworth
- 1545: George Sherard
- 1546: Anthony Browne
- 1547: Edward Sapcote of Burley
- 1547: Anthony Colly of Glaston
- 1548: Simon Digby of North Luffenham
- 1549: Kenelm Digby of Stoke Dry
- 1550: Andrew Nowell
- 1551: Anthony Colly of Glaston
- 1552: Sir John Harrington, died and replaced by son James Harington of Exton Hall
- 1553: Kenelm Digby of Stoke Dry
- 1554: Simon Digby
- 1554: George Sherard
- 1555: Francis Mackworth
- 1556: Andrew Nowell
- 1557: Sir Anthony Browne
- 1558: Edmund Brudenell
- 1559: Anthony Colly of Glaston
- 1560: James Harington of Exton Hall
- 1561: Kenelm Digby of Stoke Dry
- 1562: George Sherard
- 1563: William Caldecot
- 1564: George Mackworth
- 1565: John Floure of Whitwell (1st term)
- 1566: Sir James Harington of Exton Hall
- 1567: Kenelm Digby of Stoke Dry
- 1568: Anthony Colly of Glaston
- 1569: John Floure of Whitwell (2nd term)
- 1570: Maurice Berkley
- 1571: Anthony Browne
- 1572: George Mackworth
- 1573: Thomas Coney
- 1574: Robert Sapcotes
- 1575: William Caldecot
- 1576: Anthony Colly
- 1577: John Floure (3rd term)
- 1578: Sir James Harington of Exton Hall
- 1579: Michael Catesby
- 1580: George Mackworth
- 1581: William Fielding
- 1582: Roger Smith of Leicestershire
- 1583: Anthony Colley II
- 1584: Thomas Coney
- 1585: Kenelm Digby of Stoke Dry
- 1586: Sir James Harington of Exton Hall
- 1587: Sir Andrew Nowell of Dalby, Leics. and Brooke
- 1588: George Sheffield of Seaton
- 1589: Robert Sapcotes
- 1590: Henry Harenten
- 1591: William Fielding
- 1592: Roger Smith
- 1593: Sir James Harington, 1st Baronet of Ridlington
- 1594: Sir John Harington of Exton Hall
- 1595: Sir Andrew Nowell of Dalby, Leics. and Brooke
- 1596: William Fielding
- 1597: Henry Ferrers
- 1598: Sir John Harington of Exton Hall
- 1599: Thomas Mackworth

=== 1600–1700 ===
- 1600: Sir Andrew Noel
- 1601: Sir James Harington, 1st Baronet of Ridlington
- 1602: Sir John Harington of Exton Hall
- 1603: William Bodendin
- 1604: Sir William Boulstrode of Ridlington Park Lodge and Uppingham
- 1605: Basil Fielding of Martinsthorpe
- 1606: Henry Berkley
- 1607: Guy Palmes of Ashwell (1st term)
- 1608: Edward Noel, 2nd Viscount Campden of Brooke
- 1609: Thomas Mackworth
- 1610: William Halford of Leicestershire
- 1611: John Elmes
- 1612: Robert Lane
- 1613: Anthony Andrews
- 1614: Francis Bodenham of Ryhall
- 1615: Edward Noel, 2nd Viscount Campden of Brooke
- 1616: Richard Conway
- 1617: Guy Palmes of Ashwell (2nd term)
- 1618: Abraham Johnson
- 1619: Richard Halford of Wistow Hall, Leicestershire
- 1620: Anthony Colly III
- 1621: Sir Edward Harington of Ridlington
- 1622: Robert Lane
- 1623: Robert Tredway
- 1624: John Osborne
- 1625: Guy Palmes of Ashwell (3rd term)
- 1626: William Gibson
- 1627: Henry Mackworth
- 1628: Everard Fawkener
- 1629: John Huggeford
- 1630: Sir John Wingfield of Tickencote
- 1631: Richard Halford of Wistow Hall, Leicestershire
- 1632: Anthony Colly III
- 1633: Richard Hickson
- 1634: Sir Francis Bodenham of Ryhall
- 1635: Henry Mynne
- 1636: Sir Edward Harington of Ridlington
- 1637: Edward Andrews
- 1638: John Barker
- 1639: Thomas Levett, of Tixover
- 1640: Robert Horsman
- 1641: Thomas Waite
- 1642:
- 1645: John Osborne
- 1646: Abel Barker of Hambleton and Lyndon
- 1647: Christopher Browne
- 1648: Benjamin Norton
- 1649: Bernard Walcott
- 1651: Sir Thomas Hartopp
- 1652: Salathiell Crew
- 1654: Bennet Sherard
- 1658–1660: William Hyde of Langtoft, Lincolnshire (for 2 years)
- 1662: William Palmes of Lindley, Yorks. and Ashwell
- 1663:
- 12 November 1665: Charles Halford, of Edith Weston
- 7 November 1666: Sir Thomas Mackworth, 3rd Baronet, of Normanton Hall
- 6 November 1667: Edward Horseman
- 6 November 1668: Walter More
- 11 November 1669: Andrew Broughton
- 4 November 1670: Thomas Pilkington
- 9 November 1671: Thomas Barker
- 11 November 1672: John Newland
- 12 November 1673: William Atkins
- 5 November 1674: Richard Fancourt
- 15 November 1675: Ezekiel Johnson
- 1676: Sir Richard Wingfield, of Tickencote
- 10 November 1676: Ezekiel Johnson
- 26 November 1676: Samuel Browne, of Stocken Hall, Stretton
- 15 November 1677: John Weaver
- 17 November 1677: Anthony Palmer, of Woolfox
- 14 November 1678: Ezekiel Johnson
- 13 November 1679: Henry Warren
- 4 November 1680: Sir Thomas Barker, 2nd Baronet
- 1681: Christopher Browne
- 1682: Richard Verney of Belton
- 1683: Sir Andrew Noel
- 1684: Edward Coney
- 1685: John Bullingham
- 1686: Bushwell Pelsant
- 1687: Clement Bretaigne
- 1688: William Stafford
- 1689: Lawrence Peach
- 1689: John Flavell
- 1690: John Allen of Wing
- 1691: Richard Peach
- 1692: William Collins of Bolton
- 1692: John Wingfield, of Tickencote
- 1693: William Johnson
- 1694: Richard Halford replaced by John Brown
- 1695: Samuel Hunt
- 1696: Edmond Harrison
- 1697: Sir Thomas Mackworth, 4th Baronet of Normanton Hall
- 1698: William Stafford
- 1699: Christopher Clithero

=== 1700–1800 ===
- 1700: Nehemiah Tookey
- 1701: Bartholomew Burton
- 1702: John Wingfield
- 1703: Nicholas Bullingham
- 1704: Thomas Burrell
- 1705: Thomas Hubbard
- 1706: William Edgson
- 1707: Thomas Cox
- 1708: Henry Smith
- 1709: Samuel Barker
- 1710: William Fancourt
- 1711: John Sharpe of Wynne
- 1712: William Exton
- 1713: William Roberts
- 1714: John Newbond
- 1714: Charles Roberts
- 1715: John Boyall
- 1716: Robert Riddlington
- 1717: John Sisney
- 1718: Thomas Johnson of Tinwell
- 1719: John Whiteing
- 1720: Frances Wooton
- 1721: Orlando Browne
- 1722: Thomas Roberts
- 1724: George Brushfield
- 1725: William Scott
- 1726: William Algar
- 1727: Charles Tryon
- 1728: Edward Wright
- 1729: Kenelm Digby
- 1730: William Tampion
- 1731: George Marston
- 1732: Lycester Baroden
- 1733: William Goding
- 1734: William Fowler
- 1736: George Cooke
- 1737: Redenhall Pearse
- 1738: Thomas Bradgate of Uppingham
- 1739: Richard Sharpe
- 1740: Edmund Sisney
- 1741: Kenelm Johnson
- 1742: John Brown
- 1743: John Cooke
- 1744: Henry Shield
- 1744: Thomas Davie
- 1745: Anthony Lucas
- 1746: John Mitchell
- 1746: Thomas Wootton
- 1747: John Morpoo
- 1748: William Chisseldon, of Ridlington
- 1749: Charles Smith
- 1750: Richard Hotchkin
- 1751: Thomas Riddlington of Glaston
- 1751: William Sharrard the Younger of Langham
- 1752: Richard Marston of Belton
- 1753: William Brushfield
- 1754: James Sismey of Lyddington
- 1755: John Maydwell, of Bart Gates in Oakham,
- 1756: Robert Tomblin, cf Edith Weston
- 1757: John Digby, of North Luffenham,
- 1758: Thomas Trollop Brown, of Tolethorpe
- 1759: Edward Ward of Preston
- 1760: Charles Roberts of Belton
- 1761: Henry Dove of Tinwell
- 1762: Thomas Sharpe of Langhem
- 1763: John Batson of Empingham
- 1764: Edward Hunt of Glaston
- 1765: William Lawrence of Preston
- 1766: John Tiptaft of Braunston.
- 1767: John Ridlington, of Edith Weston
- 1768: Henry Shield, of Preston
- 1769: Edmund Sismey of Liddington
- 1770: John Boyale of Belmersthorpe
- 1771: Thomas Bullivant of Ashwell replaced by Sir Gilbert Heathcote, of Normanton Hall, Bt.
- 1772: John Stubbins of Barrowden replaced by Frances Cheselden, of Ridlington
- 1773: John Palmer, of Seaton
- 1774: Robert Walker, of Uppingham
- 1775: John Cooke, of Uppingham
- 1776: Henry Sharpe, of Wing
- 1777: Robert Hotchkins, of S. Luffenham
- 1778: George Godfrey, of Wardley
- 1779: John Freer the younger of Oakham
- 1780: Nedham Cheselden, of Manton
- 1781: Thomas Sanders
- 1782: Tobias Hippesley
- 1783: John Bellars
- 1784: John Hawkins
- 1785: Thomas Falkner, of Morcott
- 1786: Thomas Baines of Uppingham
- 1787: George Belgrave of Ridlington
- 1788: William Belgrave of Uppingham
- 1789: Benjamin Cramp, of Oakham
- 1790: Henry O'Brien
- 1791: Thomas Woods the younger of Brook
- 1792: James Tiptaft of Braunston
- 1793: Thomas Barfoot
- 1794: Thomas Forsyth
- 1795: Sir Gilbert Heathcote, 4th Baronet of Normanton Hall
- 1796: Robert Tomlin of Edith Weston
- 1797: Thomas Hunt of Wing
- 1798: William Sharrard of Langham
- 1799: Samuel Reeve of Ketton

=== 1800–1899 ===
- 5 February 1800: John Haycock, of Owston, Leicestershire
- 11 February 1801: William Kemp, of Belton
- 3 February 1802: William Gilson, of Burleigh
- 3 February 1803: Joseph Cook, of Edith Weston
- 1 February 1804: Cotton Thompson, of Ketton
- 6 February 1805: John Hack, of Clipsham
- 1 February 1806: Thomas Hotchkin, of Tixover
- 4 February 1807: William Shield, of Wing
- 3 February 1808: Thomas Bryan, of Stoke
- 6 February 1809: Abel Walford Bellaers, of Bulmerthorpe
- 31 January 1810: William Gillson, of Wing
- 8 February 1811: George Watson, of Rockingham Castle
- 24 January 1812: Gerard Noel Noel, of Exton Park
- 10 February 1813: Stafford O'Brien, of Glaiston
- 4 February 1814: George Fludyer, of Ayston
- 13 February 1815: Samuel Barker, of Lyndon
- 1816: John Cole Gilson of Berley
- 1817: Thomas Faulkner Baines of Morcott
- 1818: Robert Peach of Lyddington
- 1819: James Tiptaft of Braunston
- 1820: Robert Sheild of Wing
- 1821: William Lawrence of Preston
- 1822: Thomas Floar of Whissendine
- 1823: Thomas Thompson of Tinwell
- 1824: John Morris of North Luffenham
- 1825: John Neal of Belton
- 1826: Thomas Hill of Uppingham
- 1827: Thomas John Bryan of Stoke Dry
- 1828: Thomas Walker of Liddington
- 1829: George Finch of Burley-on-the-Hill
- 1830: John Eagleton, of South Luffenham
- 1831: Thomas Birch Reynardson, of Essendine
- 1832: William Gilford of North Luffenham
- 1833: John Muxloe Wingfield of Market Overton
- 1834: Edward Watson Smyth of Gunthorpe
- 1835: Godfrey Kemp of Belton
- 1836: Richard Wade of Uppingham
- 1837: John Stokes of Caldecott
- 1838: Matthew Laxton of Greetham
- 1839: John Monkton of Seaton
- 1840: Samuel Richard Fydell of Morcott
- 1841: Joseph Tomblin of Leighfield
- 1842: Richard Westbrook Baker of Cottesmore
- 1843: George Fludyer of Ayston Hall
- 1844: Charles Grantham of Ketton
- 1845: Henry Bennet Pierrepont of Ryhall
- 1846: John Gilson of Wing
- 1847: Richard Lucas of Edith Weston Hall
- 1848: Charles George Noel, Viscount Campden of Flitteriss Park
- 1849: John Thomas Springthorpe of Manton
- 1850: William Middleton Noel of Ketton
- 1851: John Moore Paget of Clipsham
- 1852: William de Capell Brooke of Martinsthorpe
- 1853: John Parker of Preston
- 1854: Robert Lee Bradshaw of Tinwell
- 1855: Arthur Heathcoate of Pilton
- 1856: Clarke Morris of Oakham
- 1857: Ayscough Smith of Braunston
- 1858: William Rudkin Morris of North Luffenham
- 1859: Edward Henry Cradock Monckton, of Seaton
- 1860: Samuel Hunt of Ketton
- 1861: William Fludyer of Ayston Hall
- 1862: William Evans-Freke, 8th Baron Carbery
- 1863: Henry Lewis Noel of Exton Park
- 1864: Charles Ormston Eaton of Tixover
- 1865: William Gilford of North Luffenham
- 1866: William Wing
- 1867: Edward Nathaniel Conant of Lyndon
- 1868: Robert Heathcote of North Luffenham
- 1869: Richard Septimus Wilkinson of Manton
- 1870: George Dawson Rowley, of Morcott
- 1871: John Harry Lee Wingfield
- 1872: Charles Cave John Orme of Oakham
- 1873: Francis Heathcote of Pilton
- 1874: Thomas John Stafford Hotchkin of South Luffenham
- 1875: William Belgrave of Preston
- 1876: Edward Frewen of Braunston
- 1877: John Turner Hopwood, of Ketton
- 1878: George Gerard Charles Fenwick of Morcott
- 1879: Edward Sharrard Calcraft Kennedy of Whissendine
- 1880: Westley Richards of Ashwell
- 1881: The Hon Francis Pierremont Cecil of Stocken Hall on active naval service and replaced April 1881 by Richard Tryon of Oakham
- 1882: John William Handley Davenport-Handley of Clipsham
- 1883: Edward Philip Monckton
- 1884: William Gore Marshall of Hambleton
- 1885: William Cunliffe Gosling of Oakham
- 1886: Frederick Gordon Blair of Ashwell
- 1887: Arthur Morrice Blake of Whissendine
- 1888: Robert Neill of Wing
- 1889: Blake Alexander Hankey of Essendine, Stamford
- 1890: Edward Worrall of Wing Oakham,
- 1891: George Fydell Rowley of Morcott, Uppingham
- 1892: Evan Hanbury of Braunston, Oakham
- 1893: Francis John Berry of Wing, Oakham
- 1894: William Baird of Oakham
- 1895: Colonel Charles Birch Reynardson of Essendine, Stamford
- 1896: George Whyatt Worrall of Wing, Oakham
- 1897: Henry Clarke Jervoise of Langham
- 1898: The Honourable William Charles Wentworth Fitzwilliam, of Barnsdale, near Oakham.
- 1899: Arthur Richard de Capell Brooke 1st and last Baron Brooke of Oakley

=== 1900–1973 ===
- 1900: Sir Arthur John Fludyer, 5th Baronet of Ayston Hall, Uppingham
- 1901: William Henry Neill of the Grange, Wing, Oakham
- 1902: Ernest Lucas Braithwaite of Edith Weston Hall
- 1903: Rodolf Alexander Hankey of Essendine
- 1904: Thomas Henry Burroughes of Ketton
- 1905: Richard Roger Hollins of Ketton
- 1906: Hubert Francis Joseph Eaton
- 1907: Ernest William Proby Conant
- 1908: George Hunt, of Tinwell
- 1909: William Belgrave of Preston
- 1910: Sir Edward Geoffrey Broardley Palmer, 10th Baronet of Withcote
- 1911: Major John Maurice Wingfield of Tickencote
- 1912: Stafford Vere Hotchkin of Woodhall Spa
- 1913: Seymour Pleydell Bouverie of Whissendine
- 1914: Ernest Guy Fenwick of North Luffenham
- 1915: Owen Hugh Smith of Langham
- 1916–1919: John Edward Corby of Belton
- 1920: Arthur William Hickling of The Old Hall, Wing, Oakham
- 1921: Harry Simpson Gee of Teigh
- 1922: Thomas Casswell Molesworth of Ketton
- 1923: David Needham Royce of Oakham
- 1924: Frederick Thomas Walker of Norton Lees, Sheffield
- 1925: William James Baird of Oakham
- 1926: Wilfred Henry Montgomery Finch of Burley-on-the-Hill
- 1927: Roger John Edward Conant, Bt of Lyndon
- 1928: John Burnaby-Atkins of Tolethorpe
- 1929: John Davenport–Handley–Humphreys, of Clipsham
- 1930: Cecil Gorham Gee of Rothley
- 1931: Lawrence Kimball of Barleythorpe
- 1932: Vere Finch of Manton
- 1933: Lt Col Denis Plantagenet Tollemache of Manton
- 1934: Major Charles Noel Newton of Ashwell Grange
- 1935: Major William Willmott Mawson of Uppingham
- 1936: Colonel Robert Evelyn Manners Heathcote of Manton
- 1937: Captain Samuel Alexander Watt of Gunthorpe
- 1938: George Kenneth Fordham Ruddle of Langham
- 1939: Samuel Ernest Chesterman of Wing
- 1940: Captain James Arthur Hornsby of Ashwell
- 1941: Arthur Hawley of Lyndon
- 1942: Dr Astley Clarke of Lyddington
- 1943: W/Cdr James William Ogilvy Dalgleish of Barleythorpe
- 1944: Cecil Allerton Greville Mawson of Belton
- 1945: Vere Chaplin of Clipsham
- 1946: Captain Clarence Campbell Whadcoat of Langham
- 1947: William Melville Codrington of Preston
- 1948: Colonel Rowland Pickering Spence of Braunston
- 1949: Sir Henry Tate, 4th Bt of Withcote
- 1950: Lt Col Mansell Halkett Jackson of Ashwell
- 1951: Major Herbert Egerton Whaley of Ashwell
- 1952: Captain Thomas Charles Stanley Haywood of Gunthorpe
- 1953: Michael Auriol Buxton of Langham
- 1954: David John Davenport-Handley of Clipsham
- 1955: Air Marshall Sir John Eustace Arthur Baldwin of Ketton
- 1956: Hon Robert Oliver Fitzroy of Stoke Dry (later 2nd Viscount Daventry)
- 1957: Colonel Sir Eric Gore-Browne of Glaston
- 1958: Rear Admiral Stuart Latham Bateson of Ridlington
- 1959: Rupert Winwood Gossage of Whithcote
- 1960: Sir John Ernest Michael Conant, 2nd Baronet
- 1961: Henry Richard Hoare of Wardley
- 1962: George Somerset Finch of Ayston
- 1963: Major Robert Hoare of Hambleton
- 1964: George Hamilton Boyle of Bisbrooke
- 1965: Lieutenant-Colonel Stephen Theodore Eve of Ashwell
- 1966: Michael Stafford Goddard Jackson of Tixover
- 1967: Godfrey Charles Saxton Oliver of Manton
- 1968: Giles Henry Charles Floyd of Tinwell
- 1969: Charles Hugh Hoare of The Old Vicarage, Burley, Oakham.
- 1970: Denis Sydney Player of North Luffenham Hall, near Oakham.
- 1971: John Giles Charles Gore Browne of Cranford, Lyddington
- 1972: Captain Richard Miles Micklethwait of Preston Hall, Preston, near Uppingham.
- 1973: John Michael Moubray of Ridlington House, Ridlington, near Uppingham
- For 1974 to 1996 inclusive – See High Sheriff of Leicestershire

== High sheriffs ==
- 1997: David Barry Owen of Teigh
- 1998: Lorna Lee Taylor of Ashwell
- 1999: Lady Wendy Margaret Lancaster Goldring of Preston
- 2000: Robert Noel Charles Bingley of Wing
- 2001: Michael Martin Allen of Brooke
- 2002: Stuart Geer Paton of Clipsham
- 2003: Mary Constance Lloyd of Uppingham
- 2004: Mark Edward Taylor of Manton
- 2005: Robert Edmund John Boyle of Bisbrooke
- 2006: Miranda Lynne Hall of Hambleton
- 2007: Barbara Elizabeth Gilman of Pilton
- 2008: Thomas Hornby Graham (Tommy) Cooper of Exton
- 2009: Elizabeth Anne Mills of Empingham and Ashwell
- 2010: Sarah Catharine Forsyth of Uppingham
- 2011: Peter Outram Lawson of Lyddington
- 2012: Bartle Grimston Hellyer of Ridlington
- 2013: Trish Ruddle of Oakham
- 2014: Air Commodore S Miles D Williamson-Noble of Pickworth
- 2015: Andrew Jonathan Brown of Caldecott
- 2016: Dr Sarah Haddon Furness, Whissendine, Oakham
- 2017: Craig Lancelot Mitchell of Oakham
- 2018: Margaret Susan Jarron of Edith Weston
- 2019: Margaret Allan Miles of Clipsham, Oakham
- 2020: Richard Adrian Cole of Uppingham
- 2021: Roger David Wood of Wing, Oakham
- 2022: Peter Geoffrey Thompson of Uppingham
- 2023: Geraldine Mary Ethel Feehally of Oakham
- 2024: Richard Adrian Cole of Uppingham
- 2025: Colonel Richard Thomas Chesterfield, of Whissendine
- 2026: Susannah Kate Constance Fish, of Oakham
