= Simon Digby (died 1560) =

English politician

Simon Digby (c. 1497 – 14 May 1559/1560) was an English member of parliament for Rutland.

He was a younger son of Sir John Digby of Eye Kettleby, Melton Mowbray, Leicestershire, who was Knight Marshal for Henry VIII. His mother was Katherine, daughter of Sir Nicholas Griffin KB of Braybrooke. He inherited his father's estates in Rutland in 1533, with the rest of the property willed to his nephew, John Digby, an MP for Leicestershire.

Digby was an esquire of the body in 1520, escheator for Northamptonshire and Rutland in 1540–41 and a gentleman pensioner by 1544. He fought in France under Henry VIII in the military campaign which led to the capture of Boulogne in 1544. He was appointed High Sheriff of Rutland for 1548–49, commissioner for relief in 1550 and a justice of the peace by 1558 to his death.

He was elected MP for Rutland in the Parliament of England in 1542, sitting until 1545.

He married Katharine, the daughter of Christopher Clapham of Beamsley, Yorkshire, with whom he had four sons and four daughters.

Parliament of England
Preceded by John Harington; Edward Sapcote	Member of Parliament for Rutland; 1542–1545; With: John Harington	Succeeded by Kenelm Digby; Anthony Colly
