= St Liz =

St Liz is a surname which may refer to two Members of Parliament for Rutland, England:

- Richard de St Liz (fl. 1328–1336), English politician
- William de St Liz (fl. 1312), English politician

== See also ==
- Baron St Liz
- St Elizabeth (disambiguation)
