= Everard Digby (disambiguation) =

Everard Digby (c. 1578–1606) was a plotter in the Gunpowder Plot.

Everard Digby may also refer to:

- Everard de Digby (died at Towton, 1461), MP 1446 and High Sheriff of Rutland 1459
- Everard Digby (scholar) (c.1550–?), English academic theologian
- Everard Digby (died 1509), MP for Rutland
- Everard Digby (died 1540) (born by 1472), MP for Rutland 1529
