= Scarle =

Scarle may refer to:

== Surname ==
- John Scarle, Lord Chancellor of England
- Robert Scarle, MP for Rutland
- Walter Scarle, MP for Rutland

== Other uses ==
- North Scarle
