= Thomas Burton =

Thomas Burton may refer to:

== Politicians ==
- Thomas Burton (16th century MP) for City of York
- Thomas de Burton, MP for Rutland 1377, 1380
- Thomas Burton (died 1438) (c. 1369–1438), MP for Rutland 1420,1425 and 1427
- Thomas Burton (MP for Westmorland) (died 1661), British Member of Parliament for Westmorland, 1656–1659

== Sports ==
- Tommie Burton (1878–1946), West Indian cricketer
- Tom Burton (1964–2010), American professional wrestler
- Tom Burton (sailor) (born 1990), Australian sailor
- Tom Burton (footballer) (born 2007), Australian footballer

== Others ==
- Thomas Burton (merchant) (died 1495), Loughborough, England wool merchant
- Thomas Burton (bishop) (died 1458), pre-Reformation bishop of Sodor and Man
- Thomas Burton, a pseudonym used by musician CeeLo Green in the film Mystery Men
- T. L. Burton (born 1944), professor of medieval English literature
- Stephen Longstreet (1907–2002), American author who also wrote as Thomas Burton
- Thomas Burton Adams Jr. (1917–2006), commonly known as Tom Burton
- Thomas G. Burton (born 1935), American professor and specialist in Appalachian folk culture

== See also ==
- Thomas Burton Hanly (1812–1880), Confederate politician
- Burton baronets, several of whom were called Thomas Burton
- Burton (name)
