= Edward Harington (politician) =

16th-century English politician

Edward Harington (c. 1526–c. 1600), of Ridlington, Rutland, was an English politician.

He was the son of John Harington and Elizabeth Moton. His brother, James, was MP for Rutland.

He was a Member (MP) of the Parliament of England for Fowey in 1572.

Parliament of England
Preceded by Robert Peter; Thomas Cromwell	Member of Parliament for Fowey; 1572; With: William Russell	Succeeded by Reginald Mohun; William Treffry
