= Browe =

Browe is a surname. Notable people with the surname include:

- Robert Browe (died 1451), English politician, son of Hugh
- Hugh Browe, MP for Rutland

== See also ==
- Browne
