= Robert Scarle =

English politician

Robert Scarle (fl. 1406) was an English politician.

Very little is known of Scarle. He was related to, and probably the son, of earlier MP for Rutland, Walter Scarle.

He was a Member (MP) of the Parliament of England for Rutland in 1406.

Parliament of England
| Preceded by Sir Thomas Oudeby; Roger Flower | Member of Parliament for Rutland; 1406; With: John Pensax | Succeeded by Robert Browe; William Sheffield |
