= Andrew Nowell =

16th-century English politician

Andrew Nowell (by 1512 – 31 January 1563), of Whitwell, Rutland and Old Dalby, Leicestershire, was an English politician.

He was a Member (MP) of the Parliament of England for Rutland in October 1553.

Parliament of England
Preceded by Kenelm Digby; Anthony Colly	Member of Parliament for Rutland; Oct. 1553; With: Kenelm Digby	Succeeded by Anthony Colly; John Hunt
