= John Flower (sheriff) =

16th-century English politician

John Flower (1535–1620) was an English MP and Sheriff of Rutland.

He was the eldest son of Richard Flower of Whitwell, Rutland and trained for the law at Lincoln's Inn.

He was elected a Knight of the Shire (MP) for Rutland in 1563. He was appointed three time as High Sheriff of Rutland (in 1556–65, 1569–70 and 1577–78) and a justice of the peace (J.P.) for the county c. 1573–78.

He married Margery, the daughter of Anthony Colly of Glaston, with whom he had two sons and two daughters.
