= John Newbold (disambiguation) =

John Newbold was an English motorcycle road racer.

John Newbold may also refer to:

- Walton Newbold (John Turner Walton Newbold), British Communist MP for Motherwell
- John Newbold (MP for Rutland) (fl.1414), MP for Rutland
