= Hugh Boyville =

Member of the Parliament of England

Hugh Boyville was a landowner who held a number of public offices and served as a Member of Parliament for Rutland in 1439-40 and 1447.

== Background and family ==
The Boyville (Bovile, Boyvile, Boyvill, Boyvyle) family is recorded at Stockerston, Leicestershire as early as the thirteenth century. Although in a different county, Stockerston is only a few miles from Ridlington, where Hugh Boyville lived.

There is a strong reason to believe that Hugh was a son of Sir Thomas Boyville (c.1370-1401) of Stockerston and his wife Elizabeth Walsh, as in 1439 John Boyville and Hugh Boyville were described as kinsmen to Thomas Walsh, a lunatic, when they were granted custody of his lands and person; Thomas Walsh was a brother of Thomas Boyville's wife Elizabeth. If Hugh was indeed a brother of John, he would have been his younger brother, as John was identified as Thomas’ heir in the inquisition post mortem that followed his death. This being so, Hugh would have been born between John's birth in 1391 and shortly after their father's death in December 1401. Alternatively Hugh may have been John's son, as The History of Parliament estimates Hugh's year of birth as 1410, but does not explain the reasoning for that estimate.

Details of Hugh's marriage were provided as evidence in litigation relating to property that took place in 1486 between his son William and John Norwich of Brampton Dingley. The evidence submitted in connection with that case stated that Hugh married, as her second husband, Alice who was a daughter of Richard Christian and sister and heir of his son who was also named Richard Christian.

Hugh's offspring included at least two sons:

- William – living in 1486.
- Richard – who received the Manor of Little Oxendon from his father Hugh Boyvile of Ridlington, Rutland.

It is not known how many times Hugh was married; of his two sons only William is specifically identified as a son of Alice Christian.

Hugh died at some stage between the regnal year 7 Henry VI (i.e. 1467-8), when he transferred the manor of Little Oxendon to his son Richard, and 1486 when his son William claimed to have inherited property from his father. The relevant volume of the History of Parliament mistakenly estimates Hugh's death as taking place about 1465 without stating why that year was proposed.

== Career ==
Offices that Hugh held included Sheriff of Rutland in 1437 and 1449 and Justice of the Peace for Rutland from 1437 to 1459. Hugh's alleged activities during his second term as sheriff gave rise to a petition to the House of Commons submitted by Agnes Bermythier. She stated that her husband Thomas Bermythier had been murdered on 19 October 1449 by a group of armed men procured by Sir Laurence Berkeley, Thomas Berkeley and Hugh Boyvil, then Sheriff of Rutland. She also alleged that Hugh empanelled a biased jury when the matter came before the justices of the peace and that Thomas Berkeley prevented her from suing and still threatened her. Agnes requested the Commons to ask the King that she might be able to sue her appeal against the men concerned. The final outcome of this case is not known.

Hugh Boyvyle of Ridlington was one of the two Members of Parliament for Rutland in 1439-40 and 1447.

== Property ==
Property that Hugh held or had claim to included:

- Manor of Little Oxendon, Northamptonshire – which Bridges records Hugh transferred to his son Richard in 1467-8.
- The manor of Naseby and land at Little Bowden and Great Oxendon, which his son William claimed in 1486 to have inherited from him.
