= John Durant (fl. 1399–1401) =

English politician

John Durant (fl. 1399–1401), of Alsthorpe, Rutland, was an English politician.

There was an unsubstantiated suggestion that he was the son of Sir Henry Durant and his wife, Margaret St. Liz, whose family included other MPs for Rutland. He may have been related to them in some regard.

He was a Member (MP) of the Parliament of England for Rutland in 1399 and 1401.

Parliament of England
Preceded by Sir Oliver Mauleverer; Sir Thomas Oudeby	Member of Parliament for Rutland; 1399; With: Roger Flower	Succeeded by William Oudeby himself
Parliament of England
Preceded by William Oudeby himself	Member of Parliament for Rutland; 1401; With: William Oudeby	Succeeded by Thomas Oudeby; Roger Flower
