= John Durand =

John Durand may refer to:

- John Durand (MP, died 1788) (c. 1719–1788), English politician
- John Hodsdon Durand (1761–1830), British MP
- John Durand (painter) (fl. 1765–1782), American portraitist

== See also ==
- John Durant (disambiguation)
