= Little Oxendon =

Deserted medieval village in Northamptonshire, United Kingdom

Coordinates: 52°27′17″N 0°55′40″W

Little Oxendon is a deserted medieval village about one mile north of Great Oxendon (where any population is included) at grid reference SP730846. A number of primary sources for some of the details that appear below are quoted by John Bridges in his history of Northamptonshire.

== History ==
Little Oxendon, despite its name, was historically situated in the parish of Little Bowden and not transferred to Great Oxendon until the 19th century. A chapel at Little Oxendon itself was evidently built around 1398, as in that year the building was in existence but had not yet been consecrated. The chapel appears still to have been in use when Robert Palmer made his will on 10 April 1525.

In about 1467, Hugh Boyvile of Ridlington gave up the manor of Little Oxendon to his son Richard Boyville and his heirs, with the remainder to William his brother and his heirs. In 1510, Richard Boyvile of Burton Latimer bequeathed his estate to his wife Gresyll for her life, after which it was to go to his son George Boyvile. A series of transactions during the early 16th century transferred the manor in sequence from George Boyvile to Andrew Palmer; his son Robert Palmer; Sir Thomas Griffin and lastly to Edward Griffin of Dingley who died about 1570.

An account of the history of Little Oxendon and an intricate plan of the extent of the surviving earthworks appear on the relevant page of British History Online. That source concludes “it appears that the village was deliberately cleared for sheep farming in the 14th century”. However Little Oxendon still had at least eight inhabitants in 1405 and evidence of the total population during the 15th century is lacking, so the period suggested for depopulation may well be too early.

When Bridges researched the history of Northamptonshire during the five years prior to his death in 1724, only one house remained at Little Oxendon, though there was evidence of the site of the chapel and of several former houses as square building stones and burnt hearth stones had been dug up at different times.

== Information available ==
Information about how to visit the site of Little Oxendon and the extensive well preserved ridge and furrow fields in the vicinity is set out on the Natural England website. This includes an opportunity to download a large scale map showing the relevant public and permissive footpaths and the precise location of the site of the village. The extent and pattern of the surviving earthworks can be best appreciated by consulting aerial views which can also be seen online.
