= John Hunt (died 1586) =

English politician and lawyer (c. 1514–1586)

The Honourable John Hunt

Member of Parliament for Rutland
- In office 1554–1554
- Preceded by: Kenelm Digby
- Succeeded by: Anthony Colly

Personal details
- Born: c. 1514
- Died: 27 March 1586 (aged 71–72)
- Spouse: Amy Cave (m. 1545)
- Children: Remigius Hunt; Francis Hunt; Thomas Hunt; John Hunt; Gertrude Hunt; Susan Hunt; Dorothy Hunt; Margaret Hunt
- Parents: Robert Hunt; Baringold Digby
- Education: Cardinal College

John Hunt (c. 1514 – 27 March 1586) of Lyndon, Rutland, was an English politician and lawyer. He was a Member of the Parliament of England (MP) for the seat of Rutland in 1554.

== Early life and family ==
Hunt was born about 1514, the son of Robert Hunt of Stoke Albany, Northamptonshire and Baringold Digby, daughter of Sir Everard Digby (d. 1540) of Stoke Dry, Rutland.

He was a student at Cardinal College in 1528, attained the degree of BCL in 1532, and was subsequently admitted to the Middle Temple.

He married, by 1545, Amy Cave, daughter of Sir Thomas Cave of Stanford, Northamptonshire, by whom he had four sons and four daughters:

- Remigius Hunt (d. 1618) of Lyndon, Rutland married Elizabeth Reynes, daughter of Robert Reynes of Stanford, Nottinghamshire.
- Francis Hunt (d. 1618) of Barradon, Rutland married Dorothy Durant, daughter of Roland Durant of Barradon.
- Thomas Hunt
- John Hunt of Newton, Leicestershire married Mary Lusher, Daughter of Nicholas Lusher of Sherland, Surrey.
- Gertrude Hunt married firstly, Henry Sacheverell of Risby, Leicestershire and secondly, Thomas Lacy of Leicestershire.
- Susan Hunt married Richard Francis of Ticknall, Derbyshire.
- Dorothy Hunt married Nicholas Lusher of Sherland, Surrey.
- Margaret Hunt married Andrew Reynes of Daventhorpe, Nottinghamshire.

== Career ==
In 1531 Hunt acted as tutor to Thomas Cromwell's son Gregory at Pembroke College, Cambridge.

Hunt was a Justice of the peace (JP) for Rutland in 1543, 1554 to 1560 and quarter sessions from 1561 to 1564. He was steward of the Bishop of Peterborough’s manors of Peterborough, Northamptonshire from 1548 to 1570 and Gunthorpe, Rutland from 1562 to 1570; commissioner for relief in Rutland in 1550.

He was elected Member (MP) of the Parliament of England for the seat of Rutland in April 1554.

== Death ==
He died on 27 March 1586. In his will, which was dated 28 December 1585, his Rutland properties passed to his heir, Remigius; he divided his lands between his three younger sons: Barrow and Halloughton were left to Francis; Deene, Northamptonshire, to Thomas, and the manors of Newton Burdett and Sale, Staffordshire, to John.
