= John Boyville =

Member of the Parliament of England

John Boyville (1391-c.1467) was a major landowner who served as a Member of Parliament for Leicestershire and for Rutland respectively in 1453-4 and 1460–1.

== Background and family ==
The Boyville (Bovile, Boyvile, Boyvill, Boyvyle) family is recorded at Stockerston, Leicestershire as early as the 13th century. John Boyville was born on 24 June 1391, a son and the heir of Sir Thomas Boyville (c.1370-1401) and his wife Elizabeth Walsh.

== Career ==
Offices that Boyville held included Sheriff of Rutland for the years 1433 and 1447.

John Boyvyle armiger was returned as Member of Parliament for Rutland in 1428, but he was described as of Stockerston when he served as Member of Parliament for Leicestershire in 1453–4. When he represented Rutland in the Parliament of 1460-1 he was described as an esquire of Ridlington. Although the parishes of Stockerston and Ridlington are in different counties, they are within a few miles of each other.

== Family ==
Boyville's first marriage was to Elizabeth, the widow of Sir Robert Langford, by whom he had three daughters – Elizabeth, Anne and Margaret. His second marriage was to Eleanor, who after his death married John Maners.

== Death and property ==
The memorials inside the church of St Peter, Stockerston include a brass commemorating Boyville and his first wife. The inscription is recorded as "orate pro animabus Johannis Boivile Armig. & Eliz. uxoris ejus, qui hoc campanile cum campanis fieri fecerunt, 1467" (i.e. "pray for the souls of John Boivile, a bearer of arms, and Elizabeth his wife who had this bell tower and bells made"). It is not totally clear from that printed source whether the year "1467" was part of the inscription itself or is an editorial note.

Boyville's assets were divided after his death between his widow and the three daughters of his first marriage. Eleanor received as her dower the manors of Cranoe and Slawston for life. Boyville's other properties at that stage were the manor of Ayston, Rutland, and also lands at Welham, Illston on the Hill and East Norton in Leicestershire and at Bisbrooke in Rutland. He also held one third of the manor of Packington Pigot at Little Packington, Warwickshire.

On 22 January 1465/6, John de Boyvile, esquire, was granted a licence to found a perpetual almshouse for a chaplain and three poor men near Stockerston church. However, the almshouse had not been established by the time of Boyville's death. The executors of his will applied for and received a further royal licence, granted on 9 July 1468, to found the same perpetual almshouse and also a perpetual chantry with one chaplain to be called the chantry of the Virgin Mary in Stockerston church (or commonly "Boyviles Chaunterie"). Boyville's executors were:

- Henry Stothill, his attorney and the husband of Boyville's daughter Anne
- William Hopkyns, parson of South Luffenham
- John Boyvile, whose relationship to the subject of this article does not appear to be known.
