= Edward Harington of Ridlington =

English landowner

Sir Edward Harington, 2nd Baronet of Ridlington (died 1652), English landowner.

Edward Harington was the eldest son of Sir James Harington of Ridlington and Frances Sapcote.

He married Margaret Doyley (c. 1578–1658) in 1601, in a double wedding his father married Margaret's mother Anne Bernard, the widow of John Doyley, heir to the Merton estate in Oxfordshire.

He was twice High Sheriff of Rutland, and succeeded his father as the 2nd Baronet of Ridlington.

At the manor house of Merton there was a long gallery and the 17th-century garden included a terrace to give a view towards Otmoor and the surrounding villages.

He was buried at Swakeleys at Ickenham in 1652, Swakeleys House was inherited by his son from Sir Edmund Wright. The inscription for his tomb says that his body was "translated" there.

== Family ==
Edward and Margaret had 14 children including;

- Sir James Harington of Ridlington and Swakeleys, who married Katherine Wright (1617-1675), a daughter of Sir Edmund Wright, Lord Mayor of London, both buried at Merton. They had 16 children. James Harington was appointed to make inventories of the royal houses in 1649.
- John Harington.
- Ann Harington, married Sir Richard Pigot of Doddershall, Buckinghamshire.
- Eliza Harington, married John Hacker of Hintham, Nottinghamshire.
- Jane Harington, married Richard Serjeant of Dinton, Buckinghamshire.
- Elizabeth Harington, married to Christopher Browne of Tolethorpe, Rutland.
- Bridget Harington, married to (1) Richard Ser, (2) Sir John Gore of New Place, Gilston, Hertfordshire (3) Sir Thomas Tyrrell.
- Lucy Harington (d. 1660), seventh daughter, was buried at Merton.
- Theodosia Harington (1616-1684), the youngest daughter, married John Fountaine.

Baronetage of England
Preceded by James Harington	Baronet (of Ridlington); 1614–1652	Succeeded by James Harington
