= Monica Redlich =

Comedy, travel, and children's writer

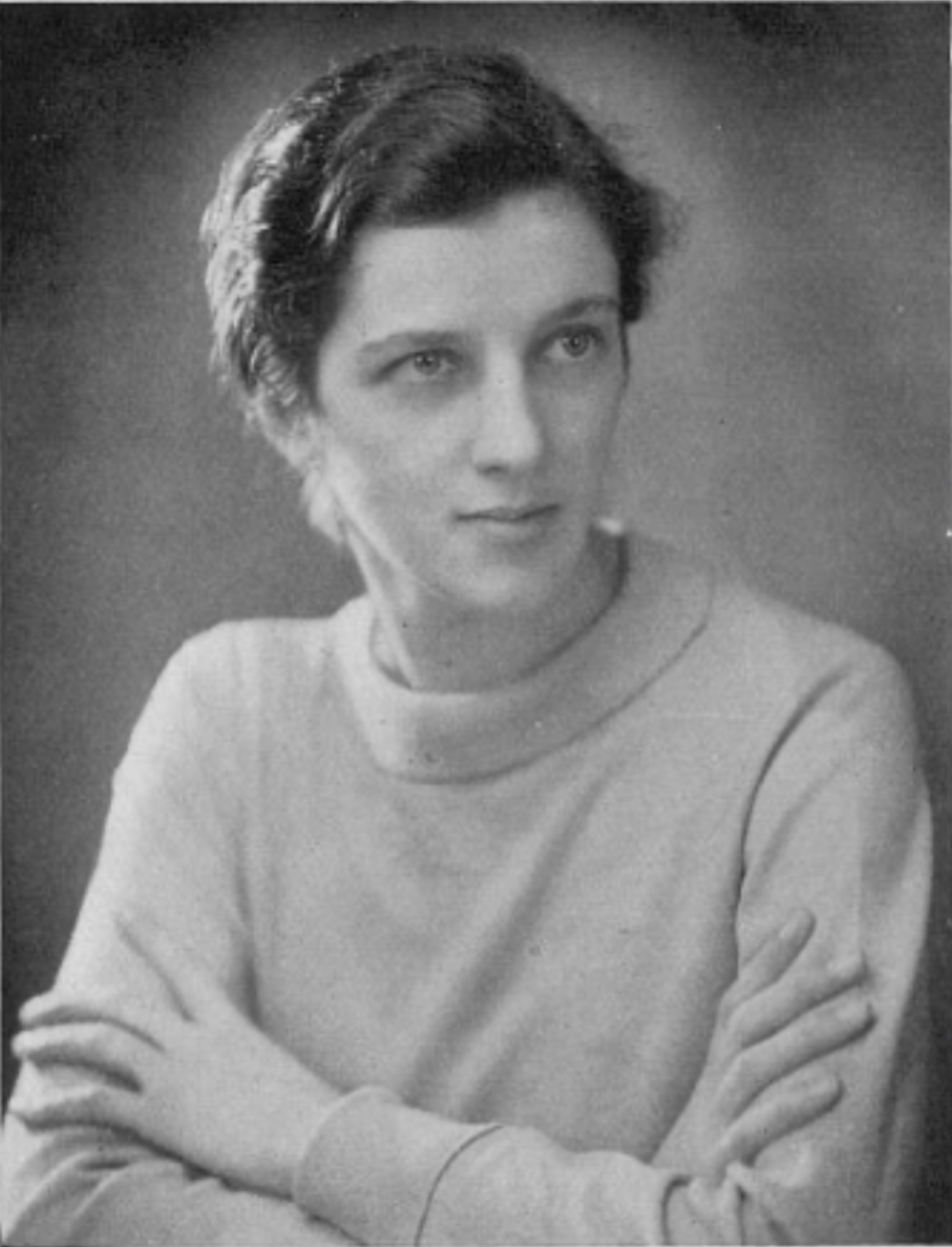
- Redlich in The Bystander (1937)
- Born: Monica Mary Redlich; 3 July 1909; Boston, Lincolnshire, England
- Died: 28 June 1965 (aged 55); Madrid, Spain
- Education: Westfield College
- Spouse: Sigurd Christensen (m. 1937)
- Father: Edwin Basil Redlich

Monica Mary Christensen (née Redlich; 3 July 1909 – 28 June 1965) was an English writer of novels, non-fiction, and children's literature.

== Biography ==
Redlich was born in Boston, Lincolnshire, to father Edwin Basil Redlich, a Church of England priest of Dutch/British mercantile heritage, and mother Maud Le Bas Le Maistre, of Jersey origin. Redlich spent her early childhood in Hampstead, London and then Teigh, Rutland. When she was 15, the family moved to her father's new post at Little Bowden on the edge of Market Harborough, Leicestershire. Redlich studied English literature at Westfield College in London, graduating in 1931.

After finishing her studies, Redlich worked as a secretary for L. A. G. Strong, with whom she co-edited her first book Life in English literature, an Introduction for Beginners. Strong dedicated his 1935 novel The Seven Arms to Redlich.

Via Hamish Hamilton, Redlich published the novels Consenting Party and Cheap Return, as well as the satirical handbook The Young Girl's Guide to Good Behaviour, illustrated by Anna Zinkeisen, instructing the reader to do the opposite of the title.

In 1937, Redlich married Sigurd Christensen, a Danish diplomat who was Vice-Consul in London at the time.

Redlich published the novel No Love Lost via Hamish Hamilton and her first children's book Jam Tomorrow, "warmly recommended for girls of 10–14". This was followed by her second children's book Five Farthings via J. M. Dent in 1939. Reviewer Marcus Crouch called Five Farthings "a story of an exceptionally nice family".

In 1939, Redlich and Christensen moved to Copenhagen, where they lived in the Christianshavn area. Redlich published the non-fiction book Danish Delight in 1939, musing on her time living there so far. The couple remained in Denmark throughout the Second World War. During her time living in Denmark, Redlich gave English lessons to the future queen Margrethe II.

Redlich returned to writing after the war with The Pattern of England: Some Informal and Everyday Aspects and then her fourth and final novel The Various Light. She also provided the forward and text for the photography book Denmark Places and People. From 1947 to 1954, her husband was stationed as Danish Consul in New York before returning to Europe. She published the non-fiction books Summer Landscape: Denmark, England, U.S.A. and Everyday England, both via Gerald Duckworth in 1952 and 1957 respectively.

The couple relocated again in 1961 to Madrid. Redlich died on 28 June 1965 in Madrid at the age of 55. Two stained glass windows in the north porch at St Nicholas' Church, Little Bowden, were dedicated to Redlich in 1969. Redlich's husband edited and published her unfinished autobiography The Unfolding Years in 1970.

Her brother Vivian Redlich was an Anglican missionary killed in 1942 during the Japanese occupation; he is counted among the Martyrs of New Guinea.

== Bibliography ==
=== Novels ===
- Consenting Party (1934)
- Cheap Return (1934)
- No Love Lost (1937)
- The Various Light (1948)

=== Non-fiction and satire ===
- The Young Girl's Guide to Good Behaviour (1935)
- Danish Delight (1939)
- The Pattern of England: Some Informal and Everyday Aspects (1945)
- Denmark Places and People (1948) (photography – forward, text)
- Summer Landscape: Denmark, England, U.S.A. (1952)
- Everyday England (1957) (republished version of The Pattern of England)
- The Unfolding Years (1970) (posthumous, unfinished)

=== Children's and YA books ===
- Jam Tomorrow (1937)
- Five Farthings: A London Story (1939)

=== Edited volumes ===
- Life in English Literature, an Introduction for Beginners (1932), co-edited with L.A.G. Strong
