= Simon de Bokminster =

13th-century English politician

Simon de Bokminster (fl. 1295), was an English Member of Parliament (MP).

He was a Member of the Parliament of England for Rutland in November 1295, alongside Robert de Flixthorpe.

Parliament of England
Preceded by ? ?	Member of Parliament for Rutland; 1295; With: Robert de Flixthorpe	Succeeded by William Murdak; Adam de Jernemuta
