= Everard de Digby =

English politician

Everard de Digby or Everard Digby (1410–1461) was an English politician.

He was a Member (MP) of the Parliament of England for Huntingdonshire in the Parliaments of 1439-40 and 1445–46, and for Rutland in the Parliaments of 1447, February 1449, 1449–50, 1450–51, and 1459.

He fought on the Lancastrian side at the Battle of Wakefield and at the Battle of Towton, where he was killed. His estates were attainted, but his son Everard Digby successfully had the attainder lifted in 1472.
