= Thomas Tyrrell =

English judge and politician (1593–1671)

Sir Thomas Tyrrill (23 June 1593 – 8 March 1671) was an English judge and politician who sat in the House of Commons in 1659 and 1660. He fought on the Parliamentarian side in the English Civil War.

Tyrrill was the son of Sir Edward Tyrrell of Thornton Hall, Buckinghamshire and his second wife Margaret Aston, daughter of Thomas Aston of Aston Cheshire. He was admitted to the Inner Temple in 1612 and was called to the Bar on 13 November 1621. In 1642, he was deputy lieutenant of Buckinghamshire. In the Civil War he was a captain, and later colonel of horse in the Parliamentarian Army under Bedford and Essex. He fought at the battle of Lostwithiel in 1644.

In 1659 Tyrrell was elected member of parliament for Aylesbury in the Third Protectorate Parliament. In the same year he was admitted as a Bencher and became joint Commissioner of the Great Seal, and Sergeant at Law. In 1660 he was elected MP for Buckinghamshire in the Convention Parliament. He was knighted on 16 July 1660, and appointed Justice of the Court of Common Pleas on 27 July 1660. He was on the commission for the trial of the regicides, but took no active part. In 1667, following the Great Fire of London he was one of the twenty two judges appointed to resolve property disputes arising from the rebuilding the city. Portraits of the judges were put up in the Guildhall by the city in gratitude for their services.

Tyrrill died aged 78 and was buried at St. Simon & St. Jude Church in Castlethorpe, Buckinghamshire.

Tyrrill married a daughter of —Saunders of Buckinghamshire. Their son Peter became a baronet. Tyrrill married thirdly Bridget Harington, daughter of Sir Edward Harington of Ridlington, Rutland.
