= John Newbold (MP for Rutland) =

English politician

John Newbold (died 1415/16), of Whissendine, Rutland, was an English politician.

== Family ==
At some point by 1409, Newbold had married a woman named Margaret. It is unrecorded as to whether they had children. His parentage is unclear.

== Career ==
He was a Member (MP) of the Parliament of England for Rutland in November 1414. He was a close associate of his fellow MP, Roger Flower. He died shortly before February 1416.

Parliament of England
Preceded by Roger Flower; Roger Browe	Member of Parliament for Rutland; Nov. 1414; With: Roger Flower	Succeeded by Roger Flower; John Burgh
