= Samuel Browne (MP for Rutland) =

Member of the Parliament of England

Samuel Browne (c. 1634–1691) was an English landowner and MP.

== Biography ==
Samuel Browne was the son of John Brown of Stocken Hall, Stretton in the county of Rutland and a nephew of Samuel Browne (d. 1668). He was admitted to Emmanuel College, Cambridge in 1650, and he succeeded his father c. 1639.

He was appointed a militia commissioner by the Rump Parliament in 1659, and was M.P. for Rutland in the Convention Parliament of 1660, (his more famous and influential uncle was also a member of that parliament, member for the constituency of Bedfordshire).

He served as deputy lieutenant for Rutland from 1671 to 1682 and from 1690 until his death and was appointed Sheriff of Rutland for 1676–77.

== Family ==
He married Anne (the daughter of John Tighe of Calceby, Lincolnshire) before 1655. They had a son who died before him and four daughters who survived him.
