= John Wittlebury =

Member of the Parliament of England

John Wittlebury or Whittlebury (1333 – 21 April 1400) was an English member of parliament.

He was the third son and heir of Aubrey Wittlebury (1306–1349) of Whissendine, Rutland, a member of one of the leading families of the county. He inherited his father's estates in Rutland and Northamptonshire after his eldest brother had died young and his other brother had entered Peterborough Abbey.

He served on the bench as a justice of the peace for Rutland from 1368 to 1399 and was appointed High Sheriff of Rutland for 1372–1374 (2 years), 1377–1378, 1381–1382, 1388 and from 1399 to his death in 1400. He was elected knight of the shire (MP) for Rutland 6 times between 1372 and 1395.

He married twice: firstly Maud, the daughter and co-heiress of Sir Walter Poynton of Canwick, Lincolnshire, with whom he had at least 2 sons and secondly Agnes, with whom he had at least 3 more sons. He was succeeded by his eldest son Aubrey.
