= Hugh Calveley (MP) =

Member of the Parliament of England for Rutland (died 1393)

Hugh Calveley (died June 1393) was an English soldier and gentleman, with an estate in Calveley and Mottram St. Andrew, Cheshire.

He was the son of David Calveley of Calveley and Mottram St. Andrew by his wife Agnes. He was a nephew of the military commander Sir Hugh Calveley, and likely followed him into military service. He was a Member (MP) of the Parliament of England for Rutland in 1385 and 1390.

== Family ==
About 1381, he married Agnes, daughter and heiress of Sir Laurence Hauberk (d.1381), of Stapleford, Leicestershire, by Margaret, daughter and coheiress of Roger Cheyne of Salop. They had two sons:

- David, who died young
- Hugh, who inherited his great uncle's estate
