= Edward Sapcote =

16th-century English politician

Edward Sapcote (1489? – 14 December 1547), of Burley, Rutland, was an English politician.

He was the son of MP, Thomas Sapcote.

He was a Member (MP) of the Parliament of England for Rutland in 1539.

Parliament of England
Preceded by ? ?	Member of Parliament for Rutland; 1539; With: John Harington	Succeeded by John Harington; Simon Digby
