= Leonard Strong (writer) =

English novelist (1896–1958)

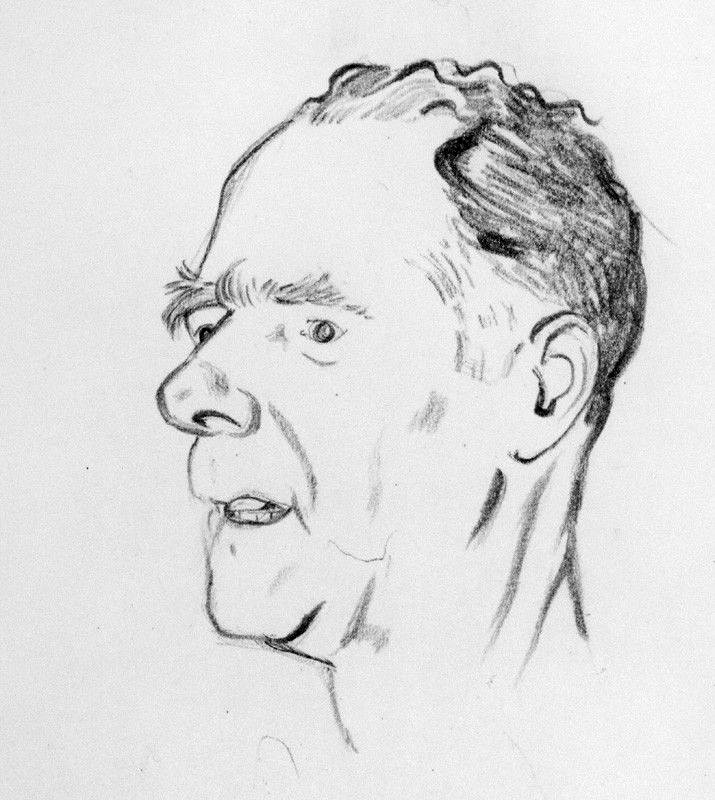
Leonard Strong by David Low.

Leonard Alfred George Strong (8 March 1896 – 17 August 1958) was a popular English novelist, critic, historian, and poet, and published under the name L. A. G. Strong. He served as a director of the publishers Methuen Ltd. from 1938 to 1958.

== Life ==
Strong was born at Compton Gifford, of an Irish mother, Marion Jane (née Mongan), and a half-Irish father born in the United States, Leonard Ernest Strong (1862/3–1948), a chemical works manager (eventually director of Fisons), and was proud of his Irish heritage. His father was a grandson and great-grandson of Church of England clergymen educated at Wadham College, Oxford. As a youth, Strong considered being a comedian and took lessons in singing. He was educated at Brighton College and earned a scholarship to Wadham College, Oxford, as an Open Classical Scholar (studies in literature and the arts). There, he came under the influence of W. B. Yeats, about whom Strong wrote fairly extensively; they met first in the autumn of 1919 and their friendship lasted for twenty years.

Strong taught at an Oxford preparatory school, before becoming a full-time writer in 1930. His first two volumes of poetry were Dublin Days (1921) and The Lowery Road (1923), and his career as a novelist was launched with Dewer Rides (1929, set on Dartmoor).

Later, Strong formed a literary partnership with an Irish friend, John Francis Swaine (1880–1954), paying Swaine a percentage of royalties for five novels and numerous short stories, published between about 1930 and 1953, which were attributed to Strong. These included the Sea Wall (1933), The Bay (1944), and Trevannion (1948). Swaine's short stories described the thoughts and experiences of an Irish character, Mangan, a fictional version of Swaine himself. Strong wrote many works of non‐fiction and an autobiography of his early years, Green Memory (1961). He gained a wide interest in literature and wrote about many important contemporary authors, including James Joyce, William Faulkner, John Millington Synge, and John Masefield.

He worked as an assistant schoolmaster at Summer Fields School, a boys' boarding prep school on the outskirts of Oxford, from 1917 to 1919 and from 1920 to 1930, and as a Visiting Tutor at the Central School of Speech and Drama. One of his pupils was a son of Reginald McKenna. He was a director of the publishers Methuen Ltd. from 1938 until his death. For many years he was a governor of his old school, Brighton College. Strong's autobiography, Green Memory, published after his death, described his family (including a grandmother in Ireland), his earliest years, his school-days, and his friendships at Wadham College; among them were Yeats and George Moore.

Following his death in Guildford, Surrey, a memorial service was held for him at St. Martin-in-the-Fields, London, on 3 October 1958.

The nurse Emily MacManus was one of his cousins; he wrote the foreword for her autobiography, Fifty Years of Nursing – Matron of Guy's (1956).

- John Francis Swaine reference authority the Oxford Companion to English Literature, Ninth Edition, General Editor Professor Dinah Birch. Swaine's papers and manuscripts are lodged with the National Library of Ireland, Dublin.

== Writing career ==
Strong began by writing poetry and published three volumes in the early 1920s. Next, he turned his hand to short stories, and his first collection, Doyle's Rock and Other Stories, was published by Basil Blackwell in 1925. His first novel, Dewer Rides, appeared in 1929 and was followed by more than twenty more. He also wrote plays, children's books, biography, criticism, and film scripts.

His works include detective novels, featuring Detective-Inspector McKay of Scotland Yard, and horror fiction. Many of his adventure and romance novels were set in Scotland or the West of England. The classic short story "Breakdown", a tale about a married man who has the perfect plan to murder his mistress, and which has a twist ending, has been reprinted often; it was a favourite of Boris Karloff. (Unhappy marriages were an occasional theme in his fiction, in works such as Deliverance.) His supernatural stories were often reprinted, as well. Strong was interested in the paranormal, as his haunted house and other horror stories attest, and believed he had seen ghosts and witnessed psychic phenomena.

One of his earliest writings, A Defence of Ignorance, was the first book sold by Captain Louis Henry Cohn, the founder of House of Books, which specialized in first editions of contemporary writers. Cohn was a New York book collector who of necessity became a bookseller due to the Wall Street crash of 1929, and he had Strong's manuscript, a six-page essay, in his collection. Cohn published 200 signed copies of the title, priced at $2.00 each.

Some of Strong's poems were set to music by Arthur Bliss. His Selected Poems appeared in 1931 (first American edition in 1932), and The Body's Imperfection: Collected Poems in 1957. He also edited anthologies of poetry, sometimes in collaboration with Cecil Day-Lewis.

His 1932 novel The Brothers was filmed in 1947 by the Scottish director David MacDonald; it starred Patricia Roc. One reviewer commented, "In a break from tradition, the film substitutes the novel's unhappy ending with an even unhappier one." Strong collaborated on or contributed to such filmscripts as Haunted Honeymoon (1940; a Dorothy L. Sayers story about Lord Peter Wimsey and Harriet Vane), Mr. Perrin and Mr. Traill (1948), and Happy Ever After (1954).

== Critical reception ==
Kirkus Reviews asserted in 1935, "L. A. G. Strong can be counted on for a nostalgic picture of the call of the wild, and spins a good yarn as well." Garrett Mattingly, in The Saturday Review, praises Strong's "clean, muscular prose" and the "astonishing variety of mood and incident" in a review of The Seven Arms, saying that he "treats material which has become familiar, almost conventional, in the literature of the Celtic renascence with a freshness and power which makes it seem completely new and completely his own. ... He has been possessed by his material, and he has, in turn, completely possessed and mastered it." (The review includes a photograph of Strong.)

Strong enjoyed describing countrysides. He often dramatized the beginning and flourishing (and at times tragic ending) of romance between young people. For these reasons, among others, his fiction writing was sometimes considered sentimental. This was a quality popular among readers, though not always among those critics who embraced Modernist attitudes, which could be contemptuous of popular literature and which was a forceful influence at the time. For example, a reviewer of an early novel, The Jealous Ghost (1930), the "story of an American who goes to visit for the first time his English cousins in the West Highland house where his ancestors had lived," judges that Strong's "feeling for 'the land' seems to be that of a tourist whose sensibilities are fluttered by views and sunsets," but who also concluded that in his talent "lies the possibility of a delicate comedy akin to that of Jane Austen or Henry James." Mattingly shows hostility to sentimentalism twice in his review of The Seven Arms (as his own writing can wax sentimental, perhaps he slightly protests too much, given the romantic qualities he admires), declaring of the heroine, "the splendor of her legend is a romantic figure out of a romantic time but a figure too robust for sentimental tenderness, too vital to be the focus of nostalgic revery" and adding that she is drawn "with sympathy and understanding but without sentimentality or exaggeration." Richard Cordell, reviewing The Open Sky, likewise calls it "an exciting, unsentimental adventure."

However, a critic who did care for this quality in Strong's fiction wrote of the 1931 collection The English Captain and Other Stories that "there is nothing ingenious or fanciful in his writing—which means that the emotion is always preferred before the form, not the form before the emotion; and that, I fear, is uncommon enough in the short stories of today. There is one piece in particular—Mr. Kennedy in Charge—which contains the virtues of all the rest; delicate perception of character, tenderness, vigour, and a sublimation of brute pain. It is a stupendous piece of imaginative writing."

Reviewing The Buckross Ring and Other Stories of the Strange and Supernatural, Mario Guslandi writes, "at his best, Strong has an uncanny ability to create gentle, vivid and fascinating stories bound to leave the reader enchanted." Ian McMillan of the Yorkshire Post called the stories "odd and genuinely chilling."

== Verse ==
- Dublin Days. Oxford: B. Blackwell, 1921.
- By Haunted Stream. New York: D. Appleton and company, 1924.
- The Lowery Road. Oxford: B. Blackwell, 1923.
- Difficult Love. Oxford: B. Blackwell, 1927.
- At Glenan Cross: A Sequence. Oxford : B. Blackwell, 1928.
- Northern Light. London: Victor Gollancz, 1930.
- Selected Verse. Hamish Hamilton, 1931.
- Call to The Swan. London: H. Hamilton, 1936.
- The Magnolia Tree: Verses. London: A. P. Tayler, 1953. ("Limited to 100 copies printed privately for the author.")
- The Body's Imperfection: The Collected Poems of L. A. G. Strong. London: Methuen, 1957.

== Novels ==
- Dewer Rides. London: Victor Gollancz, 1929.
- The Jealous Ghost. New York: A. A. Knopf, 1930.
- The Garden. London: Victor Gollancz, 1931.
- The Brothers. London: Victor Gollancz, 1932.
- King Richard's Land: A Tale of the Peasants' Revolt. London: J.M. Dent & Sons, 1933.
- Sea Wall. London: Victor Gollancz, 1933.
- Corporal Tune. New York: A. A. Knopf, 1934.
- Fortnight South of Skye. New York, Loring and Mussey, 1935.
- Mr Sheridan's Umbrella. Illustrated by C. Walter Hodges. London: T. Nelson & son, 1935.
- The Seven Arms. London: Victor Gollancz ; New York: Alfred A. Knopf, 1935.
- The Last Enemy: A Study of Youth. London: Victor Gollancz, 1936.
- The Fifth of November. Illustrated by Jack Matthew. London: J. M. Dent and Sons, Ltd., 1937. (novel about Guy Fawkes and the Gunpowder Plot)
- Laughter in the West. New York: A. A. Knopf, 1937.
- The Swift Shadow. London: Victor Gollancz, 1937.
- The Open Sky. London: Victor Gollancz, 1939.
- They Went to the Island. Illustrated by Rowland Hilder. London: Dent, 1940.
- House in Disorder. London: Lutterworth Press, 1941.
- The Bay. Philadelphia: J. B. Lippincott & Co., 1942.
- Slocombe Dies. London: Published for the Crime Club by Collins, 1942.
- The Unpractised Heart. London: Victor Gollancz, 1942.
- All Fall Down. London: Published for the Crime Club by Collins, 1944. Also Garden City, New York: Published for the Crime Club by Doubleday, Doran & Co., 1944.
- The Director. London: Methuen, 1944. Reprinted: Oslo: J. Grundt Tanum, 1947. (translated to serve as English as a foreign or second language – Norwegian language)
- Othello's Occupation. London: Published for the Crime Club by Collins, 1945. Published in the US under the title Murder Plays an Ugly Scene (see below)
- Murder Plays an Ugly Scene. Garden City, New York: Published for the Crime Club by Doubleday, Doran & Co., 1945.
- Trevannion. London: Methuen, 1948. (set in the seaside town of Dycer's Bay)
- Darling Tom and Other Stories. London: Methuen, 1952. ("Many of these stories have been broadcast.")
- Which I Never: A Police Diversion. London: Published for the Crime Club by Collins, 1950. Also New York: MacMillan, 1952.
- The Hill of Howth. London: Methuen, 1953.
- Deliverance. London: Methuen, 1955.
- Light above the Lake. London: Methuen, 1958. (posthumous)
- Treason in the Egg: A Further Police Diversion. London: Collins, 1958.

== Short story collections ==
- Doyle's Rock and Other Stories. Oxford: B. Blackwell, 1925.
- The English Captain and Other Stories. New York: Alfred A. Knopf, 1931.
- Don Juan and the Wheelbarrow and Other Stories. London: Victor Gollancz, 1932.
- Tuesday Afternoon and Other Stories. London: Victor Gollancz, 1935.
- Odd Man In. Illustrated by Phoebe LeFroy. London: Sir Isaac Pitman & Sons, 1939.
- Sun on the Water and Other Stories. London: Victor Gollancz, 1940.
- Travellers: Thirty-one Selected Short Stories. London: Methuen, 1945. (James Tait Black Memorial Prize)
  - 'The English Captain', 'Storm', 'The Rook', 'Prongs', 'Travellers', 'The Gates', 'The Gurnet', 'The Seal', '"Indian Red"', 'The Galleon', 'The Big Man', 'Death of a Gardener', 'Don Juan and the Wheelbarrow', 'The White Cottage', 'Tuesday Afternoon', 'Snow Caps', 'The Fort', 'Lobsters', 'The Absentee', 'The Imposition', 'The Nice Cup o' Tea', 'A Shot in the Garden', 'West Highland Interlude', 'Mr. Kerrigan and the Tinkers', 'Coming to Tea', 'Here's Something You Won't Put in a Book', 'Tinkers' Road', 'Love', 'Evening Piece', 'On the Pier', 'Sun on the Water'.
- Darling Tom, and other stories. 1952.
- The Buckross Ring and Other Stories of the Strange and Supernatural, edited and with an introduction by Richard Dalby. Leyburn, North Yorkshire, England: Tartarus Press, 2009. (hardcover, ISBN 978-1-905784-13-4)
  - 'Introduction' by Richard Dalby, 'The Buckross Ring', ' "Splidges" ', 'Mr Tookey', 'The Farm', 'Tea at Maggie Reynolds's', 'Breakdown', 'The Gates', 'Crabtree's', 'Death of the Gardener', 'Orpheus', 'Sea Air','Lobsters', 'The Doll', 'Let Me Go', 'Danse Macabre', 'The House That Wouldn't Keep Still', 'Light Above the Lake', 'Afterword: The Short Story'.

== Short stories (anthologized) ==
- "Breakdown," in The Forum, September 1929, pp. 139–145. Reprinted in: Creeps By Night: Chills and Thrills, edited by Dashiell Hammett. New York: The John Day Company, 1931; And the Darkness Falls, edited, with an introduction and notes, by Boris Karloff. Cleveland: The World Publishing Company, 1946; and elsewhere.
- The Big Man. With a frontispiece by Tirzah Garwood and a foreword by A. E. Coppard; being no. 6 of the Furnival books. London: W. Jackson, Ltd., 1931. Reprinted in: The Fireside Book of Romance, edited by Edward Wagenknecht. Indianapolis: The Bobbs-Merrill Company Publishers, 1948. (a short story "recounting the infatuation a British woman develops in a German resort hotel for a German guest")
- "Don Juan and the Wheelbarrow," in John o' London's Weekly, 11 July 1931; The Yale Review, March 1932. Reprinted in: The Best British Short Stories of 1932, edited by Edward J. O'Brien. New York: Dodd, Mead, 1932.
- "Harvest by the Sea, or Mr. Wacksparrow, Mr. Deebles and the Sea-Gull, a Story," in The Princess Elizabeth Gift Book, in aid of the Princess Elizabeth of York Hospital for Children, edited by Cynthia Asquith & Eileen Bigland. London: Hodder & Stoughton, 1935.
- "A Gift from Christy Keogh," in The Queen's Book of the Red Cross. London: Hodder and Stoughton, 1939. Reprinted in: 1926, vol. 3 No. 12 (New Series), January 1943.
- The Doll. Leeds, England: Salamander Press, 1946. (a tale of witchcraft)
- "Let Me Go: A Christmas Ghost Story," in The Strand Magazine, December 1946. Reprinted in: The Fireside Book of Ghost Stories, edited by Edward Wagenknecht. Indianapolis: The Bobbs-Merrill Company, 1947; Great Irish Stories of the Supernatural, edited by Peter Haining. London: Souvenir Press, 1992 (ISBN 0-285-63107-1); and elsewhere.
- "Danse Macabre," in The Strand Magazine, December 1949. Reprinted in: A Book of Modern Ghosts, compiled by Lady Cynthia Asquith. New York, Scribner, 1953; Great Irish Tales of Horror: A Treasury of Fear, edited by Peter Haining. Souvenir Press, 1995; and elsewhere.
- "The House That Wouldn't Keep Still," in The Third Ghost Book, edited by Lady Cynthia Asquith. London: James Barrie, 1955.
- "The Return," reprinted in: A Gallery of Ghosts: An Anthology of Reported Experience, compiled by Andrew MacKenzie. London: Arthur Barker, 1972.
- "The Buckross Ring," reprinted in: 12 Gothic Tales, selected and introduced by Richard Dalby. Oxford: Oxford University Press, 1998.

== Drama ==
- The Absentee. London: Methuen, 1939. (one-act play; "a powerful drama of village life, three times broadcast on the National programme" – blurb by Methuen)
- Trial and Error. London: Methuen, 1939. (one-act play)

== Belles lettres ==
- A Defence of Ignorance. New York: House of Books, 1932.
- Common Sense about Poetry. New York: A. A. Knopf, 1932.
- A Letter to W. B. Yeats. Published by L. & V. Woolf at Hogarth Press, London, 1932.
- Life in English Literature: Being, an Introduction for Beginners. With Monica Redlich. Boston: Little, Brown, and Company, 1934.
- The Hansom Cab and The Pigeons. London: Printed at the Golden Cockerel Press, 1935. (about George V)
- "The Novel: Assurances and Perplexities," in The Author, Playwright and Composer, Vol. 45, no. 4 (Summer 1935), pp. 112–15.
- What is Joyce Doing with the Novel? G. Newnes, 1936. (6 pages) Originally published as "James Joyce and the New Fiction," in American Mercury, No. 140, August 1935, pp. 433–434.
- Common Sense about Drama. London: T. Nelson & Sons, 1937.
- The Man Who Asked Questions: The Story of Socrates. London: T. Nelson & Sons, 1937.
- The Minstrel Boy: A Portrait of Tom Moore. London: Hodder & Stoughton, 1937.
- "W. B. Yeats – Ireland's Grand Old Man," in The Living Age, January 1939, pp. 438–440.
- English Literature Course. London: London School of Journalism, [194-? or 195-?]. 6 volumes.
- John McCormack: The Story of a Singer. New York: The Macmillan company, 1941.
- John Millington Synge. London: G. Allen & Unwin, 1941.
- English for Pleasure. Introduction by Mary Somerville. London: Methuen, 1941.
- Authorship. London: R. Ross & co., 1944.
- An Informal English Grammar. 2nd ed. London: Methuen, 1944.
- A Tongue in Your Head. London, Sir Isaac Pitman & Sons, 1945. ("About a year ago, the Incorporated Association of Teachers of Speech and Drama ... asked Mr. L. A. G. Strong if he would write a book which would show clearly ... problems relating to the everyday use of our mother speech."—Foreword.)
- James Joyce and Vocal Music. Oxford, 1946.
- The Art of the Story. London, 1947.
- Maud Cherrill. London, Parrish, 1949.
- The Sacred River: An Approach to James Joyce. New York: Pellegrini & Cudahy, 1951. * John Masefield. England, 1952.
- Personal Remarks. New York: Liveright Pub. Corp., 1953.
- The Writer's Trade. London: Methuen, 1953.
- Instructions to Young Writers. London: Museum Press; distributed by Sportshelf, New Rochelle, N.Y., 1958.
- "Three Ghosts and Stephen Dedalus." in Penguin New Writings Edition NW22 Penguin, 1944

== Autobiography ==
- Green Memory. London: Methuen, 1961. (posthumous)

== History ==
- Henry of Agincourt. Illustrated by Jack Matthew. London: T. Nelson & Sons, 1937.
- Shake Hands and Come out Fighting. London: Chapman and Hall, 1938. (about Boxing)
- English Domestic Life During the last 200 Years: an Anthology. London: G. Allen & Unwin, 1942.
- Light Through the Cloud. London: Friends Book Centre, 1946. (about The Retreat)
- Sixteen Portraits of People Whose Houses have been Preserved by the National Trust. Contributed by Walter Allen and others. Illustrated by Joan Hassall. London: Published for the National Trust by Naldrett Press, 1951.
- The Story of Sugar. London: Weidenfeld & Nicolson, 1954.
- Dr. Quicksilver, 1660-1742: The Life and Times of Thomas Dover, M. D. London: Melrose, 1955.
- Flying Angel: The Story of the Missions to Seamen. London: Methuen, 1956.
- The Rolling Road: The Story of Travel on the Roads of Britain and the Development of Public Passenger Transport. London: Hutchinson, 1956.
- A Brewer's Progress 1757-1957: A Survey of Charrington's Brewery on the Occasion of its Bicentenary. London: Privately Printed, 1957.
