= 1876 Rutlandshire by-election =

UK Parliamentary by-election

The 1876 Rutlandshire by-election was fought on 17 August 1876. The by-election was fought due to the incumbent Conservative MP, Gerard Noel, becoming First Commissioner of Works. It was retained by the incumbent.
