= Guy Palmes =

English landowner and politician

Sir Guy Palmes (1580–1653) was an English landowner and politician who sat in the House of Commons at various times between 1614 and 1643.

== Early life ==
Palmes was the son of Francis Palmes of Lindley, now part of Huddersfield, and at Ashwell, Rutland and married Anne, the daughter of Sir Edward Stafford. He was a member of the Palmes family.

== Political positions ==
Palmes had earlier been appointed a Deputy Lieutenant of Rutland by King James I and was a Justice of the Peace for Yorkshire. Palmes represented Rutland seven times in Parliament from 1614 until disabled from sitting in September 1643. He was High Sheriff of Yorkshire for 1622.

Palmes opposed the initiatives of King Charles I. He apparently later had a change of heart and became ardently Royalist. He would be fined heavily by Parliament and eventually pardoned, but only after being forced to sell many of his estates to pay his fines.

A will dated 31 October 1519 of his ancestor Bryan Palmes, Sergeant-at-Law still exists, showing he had lands in Naburn, Riccall, Escrick, South Duffield, Elvington, Barthorpe, Sutton, Holtby, Berrythorpe and Gate Fulford.

== Personal life ==
Palmes' daughter Anne was the second wife of Robert Sutton, 1st Baron Lexinton of Aram, who was elevated to the peerage in 1645 for his services to the Royalist cause.

Palmes was named a beneficiary and supervisor to the 1613 will of his cousin John Lindley of Lindley. The other supervisor of Lindley's will was Thomas Levett, married to Lindley's only daughter Margaret.

Parliament of England
Preceded by Sir James Harington; Sir William Bulstrode	Member of Parliament for Rutland; 1614; With: Basil Fielding 1614; Sir William Bulstrode 1621–1625	Succeeded by Sir William Bulstrode; Sir Francis Bodenham
Preceded by Sir William Bulstrode; Sir Francis Bodenham	Member of Parliament for Rutland; 1628–1629; With: Sir William Bulstrode	Parliament suspended until 1640
Vacant Parliament suspended since 1629	Member of Parliament for Rutland; 1640–1643; With: Hon. Baptist Noel	Succeeded by James Harington; Thomas Waite
