= Sir James Harington, 1st Baronet =

English politician

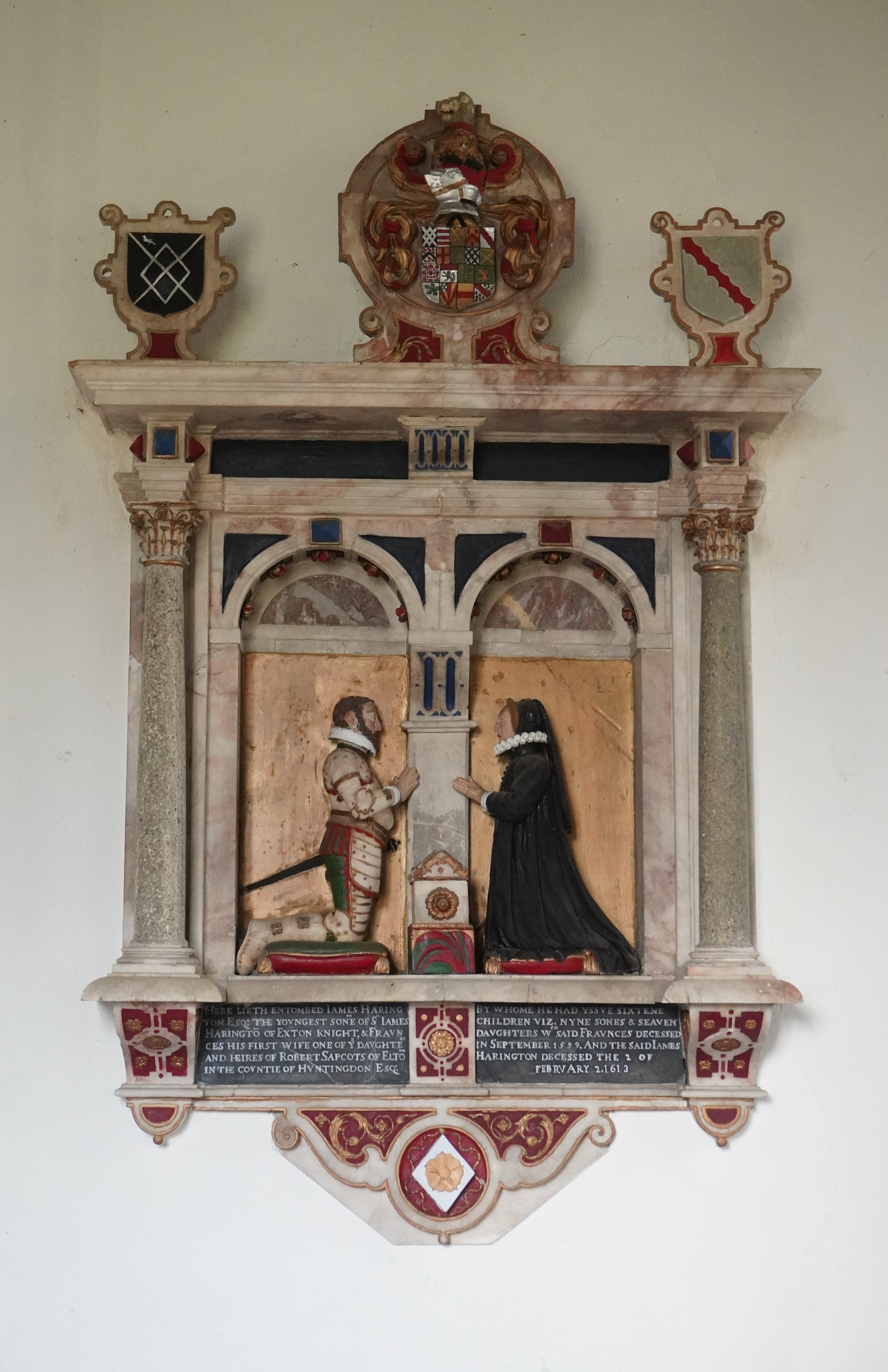
Monument of James Harington in Ridlington church

Sir James Harington (1542–1614) of Ridlington, Rutland, was an English politician.

He was the third son of Sir James Harington of Exton, Rutland and Lucy Sidney of Penshurst and educated at Shrewsbury School and Christ's College, Cambridge.

Harington was High Sheriff of Rutland for 1593–94 and 1601–02 and Member of Parliament for Rutland in 1597 and 1604. He was knighted at Grimston Hall, the house of Sir Edward Stanhope, on 18 April 1603 by James VI and I. Harington was made a baronet on 29 June 1611. He was made High Sheriff of Oxfordshire for 1606, having acquired property in that county from his second wife.

He died on 3 February 1614 (N.S.). A monument on the north wall of the chancel of Church of St Mary Magdalene and St Andrew, Ridlington, commemorates him, his first wife Frances Sapcote and their nine sons and seven daughters, noting his death as occurring in "February 1613" (O.S.).

== Family ==
He married as his first wife Frances Sapcote (d. 1599) daughter and co-heir of Robert Sapcote of Elton in Huntingdonshire. His second wife was Anne Bernard, the widow of John Doyley. In a double wedding in 1601 his eldest son also married Anne's daughter, co-heiress with Katherine Doyley Dyer of Doyley's estates at Merton, Oxfordshire.

Harington's children included;

- Edward Harington, who succeeded him as baronet of Ridlington, married Margery Doyley in 1601, their son was Sir James Harington, 3rd Baronet.
- Sapcote Harington, married (1) Jane Samwell daughter of Sir William Samwell of Upton, their son James Harington wrote The Commonwealth of Oceana, (2) Jane Woodward daughter of Sir John Woodward.
- Anne Harington, married (1) Sir Thomas Foljambe of Aldwark (d. 1604) (2) Sir John Molyneux of Teversal.
- Bridget Harington (1579-1609), married Sir Anthony Markham of Sedgebrook.
- Lucy Harington, married Sir William Faunt of Foston.
- Eleanor Harington, married Sir Henry Clinton (or Fiennes) (1587–1641) a son of Henry Clinton, 2nd Earl of Lincoln.
- Frances Harington, not yet in married in June 1613.
- Bess Harington, not yet married in June 1613.

Baronetage of England
New creation	Baronet (of Ridlington); 1611–1614	Succeeded by Edward Harington
