= John Durant =

John Durant may refer to:

- John Durant (fl. 1399–1401), MP for Rutland
- John Charles Durant (1846–1929), MP for Stepney
- John Durant (General Hospital)

== See also ==
- John Durant Breval, English poet, playwright and writer
