= Thomas Levett =

Thomas Levett (1594 – ca. 1655), was an Oxford-educated Lincoln's Inn barrister, judge of the Admiralty for the Northern Counties and High Sheriff of Rutland. But Levett's chief accomplishment was as antiquarian, preserving a centuries-old chartulary kept by Cluniac monks at their Pontefract, Yorkshire abbey, and then turning it over to Yorkshire medieval scholar Roger Dodsworth for publication.

== Early life ==
Levett was born in High Melton, Yorkshire, son of Thomas Levett. He was married to Margaret Lindley, daughter of John Lindley of Leathley, Yorkshire. Through his marriage, Levett was related to Sir Guy Palmes, MP for Rutland from 1621 to 1622 and High Sheriff of Yorkshire in 1622–23. (Palmes was eventually heavily fined by Parliament and pardoned for his Royalist sympathies.) In spite of his familial relationship with Palmes, Levett apparently favoured the Parliamentary cause against the King. In June 1647 he contributed towards the Parliament's "Ordinance for the raising of Moneyes to be imployed towards the maintenance of Forces within this Kingdome, under the Command of Sir Thomas Fairfax Knight," as documents from Parliament put it, as well as "for the speedy transporting of, and paying the Forces for the carrying on the Warre of Ireland."

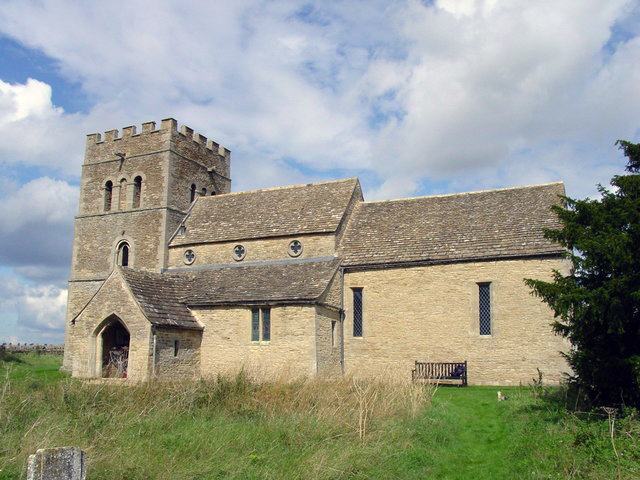
Tixover Church, Tixover, Rutland

== Antiquarian studies ==
Interested in antiquarian pursuits, Levett's lasting contribution was to the study of early Yorkshire history. Levett came into possession of the Chartulary of St. John of Pontefract Abbey, a collection of early documents of Yorkshire kept by the Cluniac abbey founded in 1090. The Chartulary was later published by the Yorkshire Archaeological Society, a publication which allowed historians a rare glimpse into medieval Yorkshire. In 1626–27 Levett gave the document to the well-known Yorkshire historian Roger Dodsworth, according to Dodsworth. As Joseph Hunter noted in his "Deanery of Doncaster," Dodsworth "was intimate with Levett of Tixover, who gave him a Chartulary of the Cluniacs of Pontefract." Within the Chartulary, Dodsworth wrote in his own handwriting to commemorate the fact that Levett had given him the manuscripts: "ex dono Tomae Levett de High Melton, in anno 1626–27."

How Levett came into possession of the Chartulary is uncertain, but the Levetts of High Melton and Normanton had been prominent in Yorkshire for centuries and had once controlled Roche Abbey. In the Monasticon Anglicanum published by the antiquarian Sir William Dugdale in 1655 is the abstract of a deed from Roche Abbey which Levett gave to Dugdale. Dugdale's caption: "ex autographo penes Thomam Levet super de Tikesover in com. Rutland." As a descendant of the family who had controlled the Abbey at Roche centuries earlier, Thomas Levett had apparently inherited many early manuscripts associated with the Levetts of Yorkshire. Dodsworth noted that the Levetts of High Melton had come from Normanton, where they were lords of the manor of Newlands Estate, Normanton, and early members of the Preceptory of the Knights Hospitallers.

== Private life ==
Thomas Levett's brother was John Levett, a well-known attorney at York. Both brothers were large landowners and active in property sales in Yorkshire.

The Cooke baronets bought much of their early estate from the Levett family, and the Copley baronets of Sprotborough also dealt extensively with the two brothers. Perhaps not surprisingly for two sibling barristers, the two Levetts often found themselves embroiled in lawsuits in connection with their property dealings. A third brother, Peter Levett, graduated BA and MA at Christ's College, Cambridge, and became the vicar of Cantley near Doncaster.

Katherine Levett, the daughter of Thomas Levett, married as her first husband Thomas Campbell, younger son of Sir Thomas Campbell, Lord Mayor of the City of London. Her second husband was John Boocher (or Booker) of London.
