= Church of St Mary Magdalene and St Andrew, Ridlington =

Church in Ridlington, Rutland, England

Coordinates: 52°36′57″N 0°44′58″W

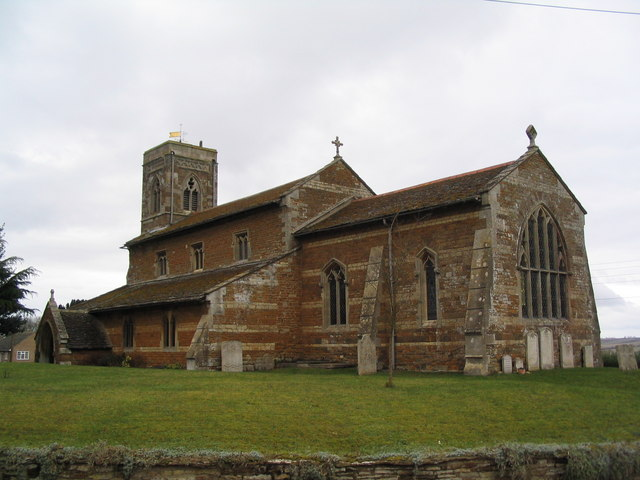
- Denomination: Church of England

History
- Dedication: St Mary Magdalene, St Andrew

Administration
- Diocese: Peterborough
- Parish: Ridlington, Rutland

The Church of St Mary Magdalene and St Andrew is the Church of England parish church in Ridlington, Rutland. It is a Grade II* listed building.

== History ==
The church is dedicated to St Mary Magdalene and to St Andrew.

The church is 13th century but there was probably an older Anglo-Saxon one pre-occupying the spot. The church underwent a major Victorian restoration in 1860.

The church has a Jacobean memorial to James Harington (1542–1614) and his wife facing each other, praying in a kneeling position.

Over the vestry door in the south aisle, is a Norman tympanum. Before the 1860 restoration, it was in two pieces in the external south wall of the chancel. The tympanum features a winged gryphon and a lion fighting with an 8-spoked wheel beneath.
