= Robert de Flixthorpe =

English politician

Robert de Flixthorpe (fl. 1295–1302) was an English Member of Parliament (MP).

He was a Member of the Parliament of England for Rutland in 1295 and 1302.

| Preceded by ? ? | Member of Parliament for Rutland; 1295; With: Simon de Bokminster | Succeeded by William Murdak; Adam de Jernemuta |
Parliament of England
| Preceded by William Blount; John Folville | Member of Parliament for Rutland; 1302; With: John de Seyton | Succeeded by Ralf de Beaufoy ? |
