= Richard de St Liz =

English politician

Richard de St Liz (fl. 1328–1336) was an English politician.

He was a Member (MP) of the Parliament of England for Rutland in 1328, 1330, 1335 and 1336. He may have been related to another Rutland MP, William de St Liz, who represented the constituency in 1312.
