= Everard Digby (died 1509) =

English politician

Everard Digby (1440 – died 1509) was an English politician.

The son of Everard de Digby (d. 1461), he was a Member (MP) of the Parliament of England for Rutland in 1478 and 1491–92, and probably also 1484.

His son, Everard Digby (died 1540), was also MP for Rutland.
