= William Oudeby =

English politician

William Oudeby (fl. 1378 – 1409) was an English politician. He sat as MP for Rutland in 1401.

He also served as Keeper of the Prince's court in Leicester from 17 July 1393 until 5 October 1399 and 17 July 1401 until his death. He served as Justice of the Peace in Rutland from 28 November 1399 until 1407, Justice of the Peace in Leicester from 28 November 1399 until September 1404 and from 27 January 1406 until May 1408. He served as tax collector in Rutland in March and November 1404. Alongside being an MP, he was also granted the title of baron.
