= Walter Scarle =

English politician

Walter Scarle (died c. 1401), of Uppingham, Rutland, was an English politician.

== Family ==
He married a woman named Margaret, whose maiden name is unrecorded. They had one son, Robert Scarle, who was MP for Rutland himself in 1406. Scarle is likely to have been related to Lord High Chancellor of England, John Scarle.

== Career ==
He was a Member (MP) of the Parliament of England for Rutland in 1368, 1378, January 1380, 1386, September 1388, 1393 and 1395.
