= Little Bowden =

Area of Market Harborough, Leicestershire, England

Coordinates: 52.475°N 0.911°W

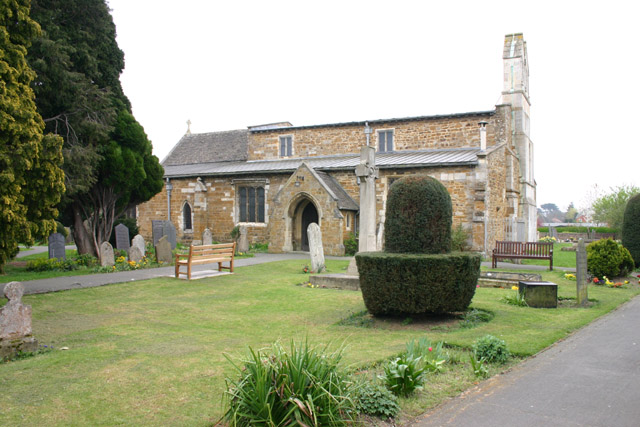
- St Nicholas' parish church

- Location within Leicestershire
- OS grid reference: SP7887
- District: Harborough
- Shire county: Leicestershire
- Region: East Midlands
- Country: England
- Sovereign state: United Kingdom
- Post town: Market Harborough
- Postcode district: LE16
- Dialling code: 01858
- Police: Leicestershire
- Fire: Leicestershire
- Ambulance: East Midlands
- Website: Little Bowden Society

Little Bowden is an area on the edge of Market Harborough in the Harborough district, in the county of Leicestershire, England. As a village it was formerly part of Northamptonshire. The River Jordan runs through part of the area.

== History ==
Little Bowden was an ancient parish in Northamptonshire. In 1879 a local government district was created covering the three parishes of Market Harborough, Great Bowden, and Little Bowden, but excluding the hamlet of Little Oxendon from Little Bowden parish. When elected county councils were established in 1889, local government districts were placed entirely in one county, and most of Little Bowden parish was transferred from Northamptonshire to Leicestershire, leaving only Little Oxenden in Northamptonshire. Little Oxendon was subsequently transferred to the parish of Great Oxendon in 1896, after which the parish of Little Bowden was entirely in the Market Harborough Urban District. Little Bowden remained a civil parish until 1927, but as an urban parish it had no parish council of its own, instead being administered directly by Market Harborough Urban District Council. In 1921 the parish had a population of 2,768. The three parishes within the urban district were combined into a single parish of Market Harborough in 1927.

== Amenities ==
- Two pubs, The Cherry Tree and The Oat Hill (formerly The Greyhound)
- The 13th-century Church of England parish church of Saint Nicholas, which is part of the Diocese of Leicester.
- Little Bowden County Primary School
- Little Bowden Recreation Ground, which is the home ground of Harborough South Cricket Club.

== Windy Ridge ==
Windy Ridge is a hill near Little Bowden. The area was often used for walks by local people. There were several attempts to build on Windy Ridge, all of which had been opposed by residents concerned by the effect development may have on the skyline and hazardous effects of battery landfill. However, the most recent proposal to build on this land was accepted by the council and is now completed.

The new estate built upon Windy Ridge by Redrow Homes is called Rockingham View.

A further scheme of development has received planning permission for another 400 homes.

== Notable people ==
- Arthur Eaglefield Hull (1876–1928), music critic and musician
- Kathleen Nunneley (1972–1956), tennis player
- Monica Redlich (1908–1965), writer, lived in Little Bowden as a teenager, where her father Reverend Edwin Basil Redlich was rector
