= Thomas G. Burton =

American academic and author

- Born: January 7, 1935 (age 91)
- Occupations: Academic, Author

Thomas G. Burton is an American academic and author with an interest in Appalachian folk culture.

== Biography ==
Burton was born on January 7, 1935, in Memphis, Tennessee. His first degree was a Bachelor of Arts from David Lipscomb College in 1956. He then received a Master of Arts in 1958 and a PhD in 1966, both from Vanderbilt University.

He became a member of the Department of English of East Tennessee State University in 1958. He became a full professor in 1967, holding the position until he retired in 1995. He was appointed professor emeritus 1996.

Burton's book on snake handling, Taking up Serpents, was described as an authoritative study of the belief by National Geographic magazine.

== Published work ==
- The Serpent and the Spirit: Glenn Summerford's Story
- Serpent-Handling Believers
- Michael and the War in Heaven
- Rosie Hicks and Her Recipe Book (editor)
- Doubting Thomas's Book of Common Prayers
- Beech Mountain Man: The Memoirs of Ronda Lee Hicks
- Some Ballad Folks
- Tom Ashley, Sam McGee, Bukka White: Tennessee Traditional Singers (editor)

== See also ==
- Appalachian studies
