= William de St Liz =

English politician

William de St Liz (fl. 1312) was an English politician.

He was a Member (MP) of the Parliament of England for Rutland in 1312. He may have been related to another Rutland MP, Richard de St Liz, who represented the constituency in 1328, 1330, 1335 and 1336.
