= John Harington (died 1553) =

16th-century English politician

Sir John Harington (c. 1499 – 25 August 1553) of Exton, Rutland, was an English politician.

== Career ==
He was the eldest son of Sir John Harington of Exton, who he succeeded in 1524 and his mother was Alice(née Southill). He was a Justice of the Peace for Rutland and Lincolnshire and held a number of other positions such as Bailiff of Leicester and Esquire of the Body.

He served as High Sheriff of Rutland from 1520 to 1521, 1533 to 1534, 1540 to 1541 and from 1552 until his death, for Warwickshire and Leicestershire from 1532 to 1533 and for Lincolnshire from 1537 to 1538.

He was elected a Member of Parliament of the Parliament of England for Rutland in 1529, 1539 and 1542. He was knighted in 1542 and became treasurer to Thomas Manners, 1st Earl of Rutland, during the expedition to Scotland.

Harington continued in his capacity as Treasurer for many years. Notably in 1543–1544 when he was treasurer to Charles Brandon, 1st Duke of Suffolk, Henry VIII's lieutenant in the North. He was also involved in the campaign in France from 1544, where he was vice-treasurer of the armed forces. Upon returning from France in 1547, he served Henry Manners, 2nd Earl of Rutland.

In later years, Harington's credibility came under scrutiny, when his servant, John Bradford, resigned his post over monies allegedly defrauded from the King. The precise nature of these irregularities has never been fully ascertained.

== Personal life ==
Harington married Elizabeth, the daughter and heiress of Robert Moton of Peckleton, Leicestershire. He had five sons, two of whom were MPs, and four daughters. His five sons were James Harington, (b.c.1511) MP for Rutland, Edmund (b.c.1521), Robert (b.c.1525) Rector of Hornsey, Edward Harington (b.c. 1526), MP for Fowey, and John (b.c.1529). One daughter is named as Mabel in the will of Edward Harrington proven 16 March 1601)

He died in London on 28 August 1553, and was carried back to Rutland for burial. His funeral trappings were described by Henry Machyn.
