= John Pensax =

English politician

John Pensax (fl. 1378–1427) was an English politician. He sat as MP for Rutland in January 1404, 1406, May 1413 and May 1421.

He also served as justice of the peace of Rutland from 28 November 1399 till February 1407, 12 February 1422 till July 1423, sheriff of Rutland from 10 July 1400 till 8 November 1401, 23 November 1419 till 16 November 1420, and commissioner of array in Rutland in December 1399, September 1403, March 1419, commissioner of inquiry in February 1402 concerning a claim by the dowager countess of Oxford to the manor of Market Overton and commissioner to raise and collect a royal loan in November 1419 and January 1420.
