= John Scarle =

John Scarle was an English civil servant and cleric.

He also Clerk of the Parliament (as the office was then known) between November 1384 and February 1397.

He was keeper of the rolls of Chancery from 1394 to 1397. He was named Lord Chancellor of England in 1399. He held that office until 9 March 1401. He was Archdeacon of Lincoln (27 September 1401 – 1403 (when he died).

== See also ==
- List of lord chancellors and lord keepers

== Notes ==
Political offices
Preceded by Thomas Arundel	Lord Chancellor; 1399–1401	Succeeded by Edmund Stafford
