= Kenelm Digby (Rutland MP) =

16th-century English politician

Kenelm Digby (died 21 April 1590) of Stoke Dry, Rutland was an English politician. He was first elected MP for Stamford in 1539 and Sheriff of Rutland in 1541.

He was born in Stoke Dry in Rutland, the eldest son of Sir Everard Digby and Margery Heydon, daughter of Sir John Heydon of Baconsthorpe, Norfolk, and educated at Brasenose College, Oxford, and the Middle Temple. He should not be confused with his grandson, Sir Kenelm Digby (1603–1665), also son of a Sir Everard Digby (executed for taking part in the Gunpowder Plot), of Buckinghamshire.

== Career ==
He was first elected to parliament as MP for Stamford in 1539. He was then appointed Sheriff of Rutland in 1541.

He was returned as MP for Rutland (as senior knight of the shire) in successive parliamentary elections in 1545, 1547, 1553 (March) and 1553 (October), 1555, 1558, 1559, 1571, 1572 and 1584. He was also appointed Sheriff of Rutland a further six times in 1549, 1553, 1561, 1567, 1575 and 1585. He was custos rotulorum for Rutland from c. 1559 until his death.

== Marriage and issue ==
He married Anne Cope, the daughter of Sir Anthony Cope of Hanwell, Oxfordshire; they had three sons and six daughters, including:

- Everard Digby
- Anthony Digby
- John Digby
- Anne Digby married Sir Edward Watson (c. 1549–1617) of Rockingham, Northamptonshire.

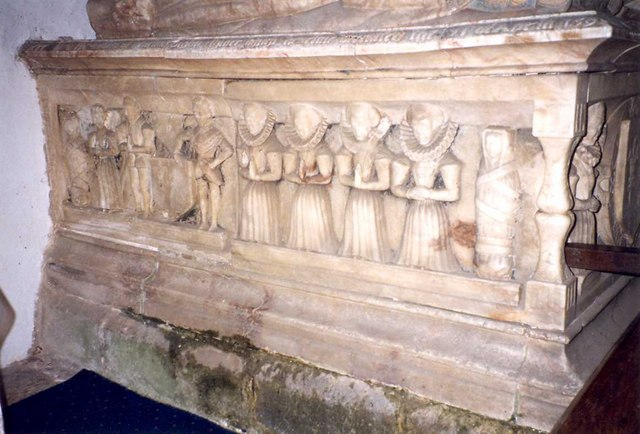
Digby's tomb in St Andrew's Church, Stoke Dry

He died 21 April 1590 and was buried in the church at Stoke Dry. His alabaster tomb chest in the chancel has recumbent effigies of Digby and his wife, with mourners on the chest sides.

== Sources ==
- Camden, William (1870). Armytage, George John (ed.). The Visitation of the County of Rutland in the Year 1618-19. Taken by William Camden, Clarenceaux King of Arms. The Publications of the Harleian Society. Vol. III. London: The Harleian Society. p. 20.
- Owen, David (1981). "Watson, Edward (c.1549-1617), of Rockingham, Northants". In Hasler, P. W. (ed.). The History of Parliament: the House of Commons 1558-1603. British History Online. Archived from the original on 19 December 2022.
- Virgoe, Roger (1981). "Digby, Kenelm (d.1590), of Stoke Dry, Rutland". In Hasler, P. W. (ed.). The History of Parliament: the House of Commons 1558-1603. British History Online.
