= Thomas Burton (died 1438) =

English politician

Sir Thomas Burton (c.1369-1438), of Tolethorpe Hall and Little Casterton, Rutland, was an English politician.

His father was Thomas de Burton and his grandfather was William Burton, both also MPs.

He was a Member (MP) of the Parliament of England for Rutland in 1420, 1425 and 1427. He was Mayor of Bayonne from 4 December 1428 to 1 December 1435.
