= Roger Flower =

English politician (died 1427)

Roger Flower or Flore (died 1427) was an English politician, twelve times MP for Rutland and four times Speaker of the House of Commons.

== Life ==
He was son of William Flower, sheriff of Rutland for 1383, by Elena his wife. He was returned to parliament as Knight of the Shire for the county of Rutland in 1396–7, again in 1399, 1402, 1404, and 1413–14. He was one of the feoffees of the Brigittine nunnery founded by Henry V at Syon in 1414. Still representing the county of Rutland, he was chosen speaker of the House of Commons four times—in 1416, 1417, 1419, and 1422, something unprecedented except in the case of Thomas Chaucer.

He was a lawyer with considerable private and public interests. In 1416 he was made chief steward of the Duchy of Lancaster estates north of the Trent. Besides his ancestral manor of Oakham in Rutland, he held estates in Leicestershire. He was appointed Sheriff of Rutland for 1407 and 1412.

The probate of his will was dated 20 June 1428; Flower had died by 12 November 1427.

== Family ==
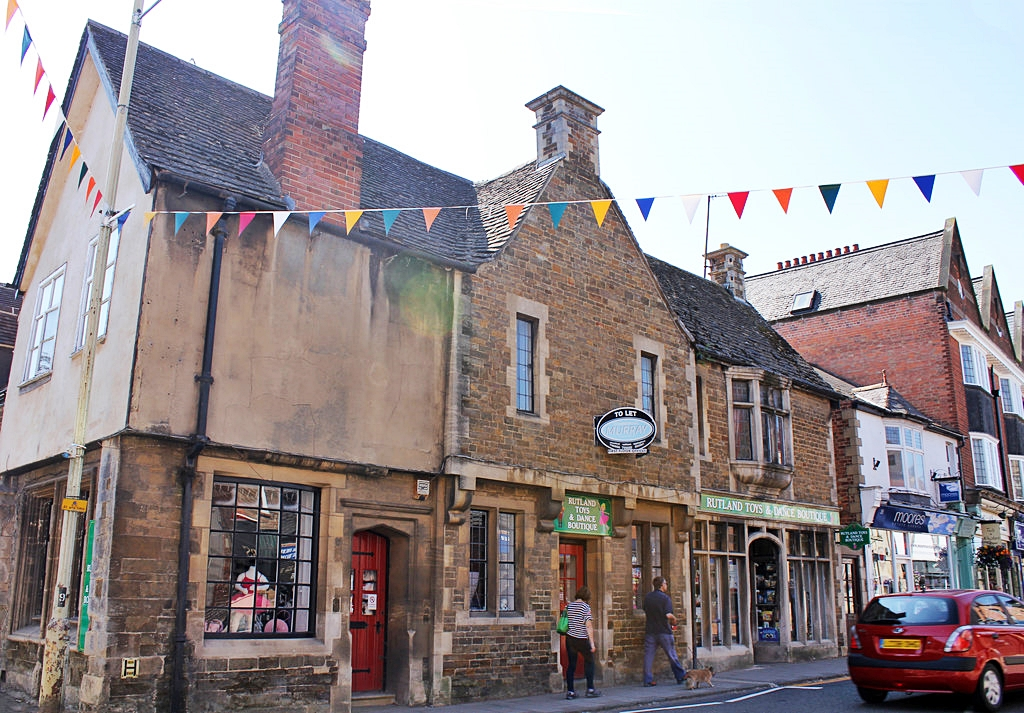
Flore's House, Oakham

His first wife was Catherine, daughter and heiress of William Dalby of Exton. His second wife, Cecile, daughter of Anneys Sainon, survived him. He had five sons, Thomas, Robert, Roger, John, and William, and two daughters, Anneys and Joan, the latter being married to Sir Henry Plesyngton of Burley in Rutland, grandson of Sir Robert Plesyngton, chief baron of the exchequer in the reign of Richard II.

His eldest son and heir Thomas was twice MP for Rutland and six times Sheriff of Rutland.

The family home, called Flore's House, is a prominent listed building on High Street, Oakham.

Political offices
Preceded by Walter Beauchamp	Speaker of the House of Commons; 1416–1419	Succeeded by Roger Hunt
Preceded by Richard Baynard	Speaker of the House of Commons; 1422	Succeeded by Sir John Russell
