= Robert Browe =

English politician

Robert Browe (died 1451), of Teigh and Woodhead, Rutland, was an English politician.

He was the son of MP, Hugh Browe. He was a Member of the Parliament of England (MP) for Rutland in 1407, April 1414, 1419, 1423, 1429, 1431 and 1439.

== Description ==
Robert Browe, esquire to Walter Busshell and others: Appointment of an attorney to give seisin of all his lands, etc.: Ches.
