= Everard Digby (died 1540) =

16th-century English politician

Everard Digby (died 1540), was an English politician.

He was a Member (MP) of the Parliament of England for Rutland in 1529.
