= Anthony Colly =

16th-century English politician

Anthony Colly (1502/3–1574), of Glaston, Rutland, was an English politician.

He married Catherine, the daughter of William Skeffington, MP for Leicestershire, and they had three daughters.

He was a member (MP) of the Parliament of England for Rutland in 1545, 1547, March 1553, April 1554, November 1554 and 1563.
