= Rutland (constituency) =

Former parliamentary constituency covering the county of Rutland

- Former county constituency for the House of Commons
- County: Rutland
- Major settlements: Oakham and Uppingham

1290–1918
- Seats: 1290–1885: Two; 1885–1918: One
- Replaced by: Rutland & Stamford

Rutland was a parliamentary constituency covering the county of Rutland. It was represented in the House of Commons of the Parliament of the United Kingdom until 1918, when it became part of the Rutland and Stamford constituency, along with Stamford in Lincolnshire. Since 1983, Rutland has formed part of the Rutland and Melton constituency along with Melton Mowbray from Leicestershire.

The constituency elected two Members of Parliament (MPs), traditionally known as Knights of the Shire, until 1885, when it was reduced to one Member.

== Boundaries ==
The constituency comprised the whole of the historic county of Rutland, in the East Midlands. Rutland, the smallest of the historic counties of England, never had any Parliamentary borough constituencies within its borders.

The place of election for the county was at Oakham. This was where the hustings were held; at which candidates were nominated (before the Ballot Act 1872), polling took place (before the introduction of multiple polling places in county constituencies) and where the result was announced.

Pelling in his Social Geography of British Elections 1885–1910 describes most of the people in this county as "engaged in or dependent upon agriculture". The constituency was a safe Conservative one and was rarely contested in the period covered by the book. G. H. Finch MP had personally owned almost one tenth of the county he represented.

== Members of Parliament ==
=== 1295–1640 ===
Parliament	First member	Second member
1295 (Nov)	Robert de Flixthorpe	Simon de Bokminster
1297 (Sep)	William Murdak	Adam de Jernemuta
1298 (May)	John Folville	William de Berck
1301 (Jan)	William Blount	John Folville
1302 (Oct)	John de Seyton	Robert de Flixthorpe
1310	Ralf de Beaufoy	
1312	William de St Liz	
1313 (Mar)	William de Hellewell	Alan de Frankton
1318	John de Beaufoy	
1328	Richard de St Liz	
1330	Richard de St Liz	
1335	Richard de St Liz	
1336	Richard de St Liz	
1337	John de Seyton	
1340 (Jan)	Robert de Hellewell	no Second member
1363	William Beaufoy	
1365	William Beaufoy	
1368	Walter Scarle	
1369	William Beaufoy	
1372	John Wittlebury	
1377	Thomas de Burton	
1378	Walter Scarle	
1380 (Jan)	Walter Scarle	
1380 (Nov)	John Wittlebury	
1380	Thomas de Burton	
1381	John Wittlebury	
1382	Thomas de Burton	
1383	John Calveley	
1383 (Oct)	John Wittlebury	
1384	Robert Harrington	
1385	Hugh Calveley	Walter Scarle
1386	John Wittlebury	Walter Scarle
1388 (Feb)	Sir Hugh Browe	Sir Oliver Mauleverer
1388 (Sep)	Sir John Daneys	Walter Scarle
1390 (Jan)	Hugh Calveley	Sir Oliver Mauleverer
1390 (Nov)	Sir Hugh Browe	Sir John Calveley
1391	Sir John Bussy	Sir Hugh Greenham
1393	Sir Walter Scarle	Sir John Elme
1394	Sir John Daneys	Sir John Elme
1395	John Wittlebury	Sir Walter Scarle
1397 (Jan)	Sir Robert Plesington	Roger Flore
1397 (Sep)	Sir Oliver Mauleverer	Sir Thomas Oudeby
1399	John Durant	Roger Flore|-
1401	John Durant	William Oudeby
1402	Sir Thomas Oudeby	Roger Flore
1404 (Jan)	Thomas Thorpe	John Pensax
1404 (Oct)	Sir Thomas Oudeby	Roger Flore
1406	John Pensax	Robert Scarle
1407	Robert Browe	William Sheffield
1410		
1411		
1413 (Feb)		
1413 (May)	John Pensax	John Burgh
1414 (Apr)	Roger Flore	Robert Browe
1414 (Nov)	Roger Flore	John Newbold
1415	Roger Flore	John Burgh
1416 (Mar)	Roger Flore	Geoffrey Paynell
1416 (Oct)	Roger Flore	
1417	Roger Flore	?
1419	Roger Flore	Robert Browe
1420	Sir Thomas Burton	Sir Henry Pleasington
1421 (May)	John Pensax	William Sheffield
1421 (Dec)	John Culpepper	Thomas Greenham
1422	Roger Flore	Sir Henry Pleasington
1423	Robert Browe	
1425	Sir Thomas Burton	Sir Henry Pleasington
1427	Sir Thomas Burton	
1429	Robert Browe	
1431	Robert Browe	
1432	Thomas Flore	
1433	William Beaufoy	
1434	William Beaufoy	
1439–40	Robert Browe	Hugh Boivyle
1445	Thomas Flore	
1447	Hugh Boyvyle	Everard Dygby
1449	Everard Digby	John Browe
1450	Thomas Palmer	Everard Digby
1510–1523	No names known	
1529	Sir Everard Digby	John Harington
1536		
1539	John Harington	Edward Sapcote
1542	John Harington	Simon Digby
1545	Kenelm Digby	Anthony Colly
1547	Kenelm Digby	Anthony Colly
1553 (Mar)	Kenelm Digby	Anthony Colly
1553 (Oct)	Andrew Nowell	Kenelm Digby
1554 (Apr)	Anthony Colly	John Hunt
1554 (Nov)	James Harington	Anthony Colly
1555	James Harington	Kenelm Digby
1558	Kenelm Digby	James Harington
1558–1559	James Harington	Kenelm Digby
1562–1563	Anthony Colly	John Flower
1571	Kenelm Digby	John Harington
1572 (Apr)	Sir James Harington	Kenelm Digby
1584	Kenelm Digby	(Sir) Andrew Noel
1586 (Oct)	Sir James Harington	(Sir) Andrew Noel
1588	Sir James Harington	(Sir) Andrew Noel
1593	Sir John Harington	(Sir) Andrew Noel
1597	William Cecil	Sir James Harington
1601 (Oct)	Sir John Harington	(Sir) Andrew Noel, declared void, Nov 1601 replaced by Edward Noel
1604–1611	Sir James Harington	Sir William Bulstrode
1614	Sir Guy Palmes	Basil Fielding
1621–1622	Sir Guy Palmes	Sir William Bulstrode
1624	Sir Guy Palmes	Sir William Bulstrode
1625	Sir Guy Palmes	Sir William Bulstrode
1626	Sir William Bulstrode	Sir Francis Bodenham
1628	Sir Guy Palmes	Sir William Bulstrode
1629–1640	No Parliaments convened	

=== 1640–1885 ===
Year	First member	First party	Second member	Second party
November 1640	Hon. Baptist Noel	Royalist	Sir Guy Palmes	Royalist
1643	Noel succeeded to peerage, August 1643 – seat vacant		Palmes disabled from sitting, September 1643 – seat vacant	
1646	James Harington		Thomas Waite	
1653	Edward Horseman		Rutland had only one representative in the Barebones Parliament	
1654	Edward Horseman		William Shield	
1656	Abel Barker		William Shield	
January 1659	Edward Horseman		William Shield	
May 1659	Sir James Harington		Thomas Waite not recorded as participating in the restored Rump	
April 1660	Philip Sherard		Samuel Browne	
1661	Philip Sherard		Edward Noel	
February 1679	Philip Sherard		Sir Thomas Mackworth	
August 1679	Philip Sherard		Sir Abel Barker	
1680	Philip Sherard		Sir Thomas Mackworth	
1681	Philip Sherard		Edward Fawkener	
1685	Baptist Noel	Tory	Sir Thomas Mackworth	
1689	Bennet Sherard		Sir Thomas Mackworth	
1694	Bennet Sherard		Sir Thomas Mackworth	
1695	Bennet Sherard		Lord Burghley	
1698	Richard Halford		Lord Burghley	
1701	Richard Halford		Sir Thomas Mackworth	
1708	Richard Halford		Philip Sherard	
1710	Lord Finch		John Noel	
1711	Lord Finch		Richard Halford	
1713	Lord Finch		The Lord Sherard	
1715	Lord Finch		John Noel	
1719	Lord Finch		Marquess of Granby	Whig
1721	Lord Finch		Sir Thomas Mackworth	
1727	Lord Finch		John Noel	
1728	Lord Finch		Thomas Noel	
1730	William Burton		Thomas Noel	
1734	James Noel		Thomas Noel	
1741	James Noel		John Finch	
1747	James Noel		Lord Burghley	
1753	Thomas Noel		Lord Burghley	
1754	Thomas Noel		George Bridges Brudenell	
1761	Thomas Noel		Hon. Thomas Chambers Cecil	
1768	Thomas Noel		George Bridges Brudenell	
1788	Gerard Edwardes	Tory	George Bridges Brudenell	
1790	Gerard Edwardes	Tory	John Heathcote	Tory
1795	Gerard Edwardes	Tory	Lord Sherard	Tory
1796	Gerard Edwardes	Tory	Sir William Lowther, Bt	Tory
1802	Gerard Edwardes	Tory	The Lord Carbery	Tory
1805	Gerard Edwardes	Tory	The Lord Henniker	Tory
1808	Charles Noel	Tory	The Lord Henniker	Tory
1812	Charles Noel	Tory	Sir Gilbert Heathcote, Bt	Whig
1814	Sir Gerard Noel, Bt	Tory	Sir Gilbert Heathcote, Bt	Whig
1830	Sir Gerard Noel, Bt	Tory	Sir Gilbert Heathcote, Bt	Whig
1834	Sir Gerard Noel, Bt	Conservative	Sir Gilbert Heathcote, Bt	Whig
1838	Hon. William Noel	Conservative	Sir Gilbert Heathcote, Bt	Whig
1840	Hon. Charles Noel	Whig	Sir Gilbert Heathcote, Bt	Whig
1841	Sir Gilbert Heathcote, Bt	Whig	Hon. William Dawnay	Conservative
1846	Sir Gilbert Heathcote, Bt	Whig	George Finch	Conservative
1847	Sir Gilbert Heathcote, Bt	Whig	Hon. Gerard Noel	Conservative
1856	Hon. Gilbert Heathcote	Whig	Hon. Gerard Noel	Conservative
1859	Hon. Gilbert Heathcote	Liberal	Hon. Gerard Noel	Conservative
1867	George Finch	Conservative	Hon. Gerard Noel	Conservative
1883	George Finch	Conservative	James Lowther	Conservative
1885	Representation reduced to one member			

=== 1885–1918 ===
Year	Member of Parliament	Party
1885	George Finch	Conservative
1907	John Gretton	Conservative
1918	Constituency abolished: see Rutland and Stamford	

== Elections ==
Population in 1831: 19,380

General Election 1832 (14 December)
Registered Electors: 1,296
G N Noel, Bart. Conservative
G Heathcote Whig

General Election 1835 (10 January)
G N Noel, Bart. Conservative
G Heathcote Whig

General Election 1837 (29 July)
G N Noel, Bart. Conservative
G Heathcote Whig

Following the death of Sir G N Noel:

By-Election 1838 (13 March)
W M Noel Conservative

=== Elections in the 1830s ===
General election 1830: Rutland (2 seats)
Party	Candidate	Votes	%
Whig	Gilbert Heathcote	Unopposed	
Tory	Gerard Noel Noel	Unopposed	
Registered electors		c. 800	
Whig gain from Tory			
Tory hold			

General election 1831: Rutland (2 seats)
Party	Candidate	Votes	%
Whig	Gilbert Heathcote	Unopposed	
Tory	Gerard Noel Noel	Unopposed	
Registered electors		c. 800	
Whig hold			
Tory hold			

General election 1832: Rutland (2 seats)
Party	Candidate	Votes	%
Whig	Sir Gilbert Heathcote	Unopposed	
Tory	Sir Gerard Noel Noel	Unopposed	
Registered electors		1,296	
Whig hold			
Tory hold			

General election 1835: Rutland (2 seats)
Party	Candidate	Votes	%
Whig	Sir Gilbert Heathcote	Unopposed	
Conservative	Sir Gerard Noel Noel	Unopposed	
Registered electors		1,264	
Whig hold			
Conservative hold			

General election 1837: Rutland (2 seats)
Party	Candidate	Votes	%
Whig	Sir Gilbert Heathcote	Unopposed	
Conservative	Sir Gerard Noel Noel	Unopposed	
Registered electors		1,325	
Whig hold			
Conservative hold			

Noel's death caused a by-election.

By-election, 13 March 1838: Rutland
Party	Candidate	Votes	%
Conservative	William Noel	Unopposed	
Conservative hold			

=== Elections in the 1840s ===
Noel resigned by accepting the office of Steward of the Chiltern Hundreds, causing a by-election.

By-election, 28 January 1840: Rutland
Party	Candidate	Votes	%	±%
Whig	Charles Noel	Unopposed		
Whig gain from Conservative				

General election 1841: Rutland (2 seats)
Party	Candidate	Votes	%	±%
Whig	Gilbert John Heathcote	767	36.4	N/A
Conservative	William Dawnay	676	32.1	N/A
Whig	Charles Noel	664	31.5	N/A
Turnout		1,341	86.1	N/A
Registered electors		1,557		
Majority		91	4.3	N/A
Whig hold		Swing	N/A	
Majority		12	0.6	N/A
Conservative hold		Swing	N/A	

Dawnay resigned by accepting the office of Steward of the Chiltern Hundreds, causing a by-election.

By-election, 14 February 1846: Rutland
Party	Candidate	Votes	%	±%
Conservative	George Finch	Unopposed		
Conservative hold				

General election 1847: Rutland (2 seats)
Party	Candidate	Votes	%	±%
Whig	Gilbert John Heathcote	Unopposed		
Conservative	Gerard Noel	Unopposed		
Registered electors		1,887		
Whig hold				
Conservative hold				

=== Elections in the 1850s ===
General election 1852: Rutland (2 seats)
Party	Candidate	Votes	%	±%
Whig	Sir Gilbert John Heathcote	Unopposed		
Conservative	Gerard Noel	Unopposed		
Registered electors		1,876		
Whig hold				
Conservative hold				

Heathcote was elevated to the peerage, becoming 1st Baron Aveland and causing a by-election.

By-election, 4 March 1856: Rutland
Party	Candidate	Votes	%	±%
Whig	Gilbert Heathcote	Unopposed		
Whig hold				

General election 1857: Rutland (2 seats)
Party	Candidate	Votes	%	±%
Whig	Gilbert Heathcote	Unopposed		
Conservative	Gerard Noel	Unopposed		
Registered electors		1,822		
Whig hold				
Conservative hold				

General election 1859: Rutland (2 seats)
Party	Candidate	Votes	%	±%
Liberal	Gilbert Heathcote	Unopposed		
Conservative	Gerard Noel	Unopposed		
Registered electors		1,810		
Liberal hold				
Conservative hold				

=== Elections in the 1860s ===
General election 1865: Rutland (2 seats)
Party	Candidate	Votes	%	±%
Liberal	Gilbert Heathcote	Unopposed		
Conservative	Gerard Noel	Unopposed		
Registered electors		1,774		
Liberal hold				
Conservative hold				

Noel was appointed a Lord Commissioner of the Treasury, requiring a by-election.

By-election, 14 July 1866: Rutland
Party	Candidate	Votes	%	±%
Conservative	Gerard Noel	Unopposed		
Conservative hold				

Heathcote succeeded to the peerage, becoming Lord Aveland and causing a by-election.

By-election, 23 November 1867: Rutland
Party	Candidate	Votes	%	±%
Conservative	George Finch	Unopposed		
Conservative gain from Liberal				

General election 1868: Rutland (2 seats)
Party	Candidate	Votes	%	±%
Conservative	George Finch	Unopposed		
Conservative	Gerard Noel	Unopposed		
Registered electors		2,200		
Conservative hold				
Conservative gain from Liberal				

=== Elections in the 1870s ===
General election 1874: Rutland (2 seats)
Party	Candidate	Votes	%	±%
Conservative	George Finch	Unopposed		
Conservative	Gerard Noel	Unopposed		
Registered electors		1,950		
Conservative hold				
Conservative hold				

Noel was appointed First Commissioner of Works.

By-election, 17 Aug 1876: Rutland (1 seat)
Party	Candidate	Votes	%	±%
Conservative	Gerard Noel	Unopposed		
Conservative hold				

=== Elections in the 1880s ===
General election 1880: Rutland (2 seats)
Party	Candidate	Votes	%	±%
Conservative	George Finch	Unopposed		
Conservative	Gerard Noel	Unopposed		
Registered electors		1,736		
Conservative hold				
Conservative hold				

Noel's resignation caused a by-election, which was the first contest in the constituency for 42 years.

By-election, 1 Sep 1883: Rutland (1 seat)
Party	Candidate	Votes	%	±%
Conservative	James Lowther	860	81.6	N/A
Liberal	John William Davenport-Handley	194	18.4	New
Majority		666	63.2	N/A
Turnout		1,054	59.6	N/A
Registered electors		1,768		
Conservative hold				

Buszard

General election 1885: Rutland
Party	Candidate	Votes	%	±%
Conservative	George Finch	2,366	68.1	N/A
Liberal	Marston Clarke Buszard	1,110	31.9	N/A
Majority		1,256	36.2	N/A
Turnout		3,476	83.4	N/A
Registered electors		4,166		
Conservative hold		Swing	N/A	

Finch

General election 1886: Rutland
Party	Candidate	Votes	%	±%
Conservative	George Finch	Unopposed		
Conservative hold				

=== Elections in the 1890s ===
General election 1892: Rutland
Party	Candidate	Votes	%	±%
Conservative	George Finch	Unopposed		
Conservative hold				

General election 1895: Rutland
Party	Candidate	Votes	%	±%
Conservative	George Finch	Unopposed		
Conservative hold				

=== Elections in the 1900s ===
General election 1900: Rutland
Party	Candidate	Votes	%	±%
Conservative	George Finch	Unopposed		
Conservative hold				

Pearson

General election 1906: Rutland
Party	Candidate	Votes	%	±%
Conservative	George Finch	2,047	56.7	N/A
Liberal	Harold Pearson	1,564	43.3	New
Majority		483	13.4	N/A
Turnout		3,611	89.3	N/A
Registered electors		4,042		
Conservative hold		Swing	N/A	

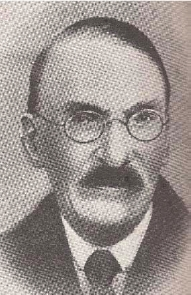
John Gretton

1907 Rutland by-election
Party	Candidate	Votes	%	±%
Conservative	John Gretton	2,213	61.9	+5.2
Liberal	W F H Lyon	1,362	38.1	−5.2
Majority		851	23.8	+10.4
Turnout		3,575	87.6	−1.7
Registered electors		4,083		
Conservative hold		Swing	+5.2	

=== Elections in the 1910s ===
General election January 1910: Rutland
Party	Candidate	Votes	%	±%
Conservative	John Gretton	2,235	59.3	+2.6
Liberal	Joseph Nathaniel Emery	1,531	40.7	−2.6
Majority		704	18.6	+5.2
Turnout		3,766	91.2	+1.9
Registered electors		4,128		
Conservative hold		Swing	+2.6	

General election December 1910: Rutland
Party	Candidate	Votes	%	±%
Conservative	John Gretton	2,169	61.3	+2.0
Liberal	Joseph Nathaniel Emery	1,367	38.7	−2.0
Majority		802	22.6	+4.0
Turnout		3,536	85.7	−5.5
Registered electors		4,128		
Conservative hold		Swing	+2.0	

General Election 1914–15:

Another General Election was required to take place before the end of 1915. The political parties had been making preparations for an election to take place and by July 1914, the following candidates had been selected;

- Unionist: John Gretton
- Liberal:

== Sources ==
- Robert Beatson, A Chronological Register of Both Houses of Parliament (London: Longman, Hurst, Res & Orme, 1807)
- D Brunton & D H Pennington, Members of the Long Parliament (London: George Allen & Unwin, 1954)
- Cobbett's Parliamentary history of England, from the Norman Conquest in 1066 to the year 1803 (London: Thomas Hansard, 1808) Digital Bodleian
- F W S Craig, Boundaries of Parliamentary Constituencies 1885–1972 (Parliamentary Reference Publications 1972)
- F W S Craig, British Parliamentary Election Results 1832–1885 (2nd edition, Aldershot: Parliamentary Research Services, 1989)
- M Kinnear, The British Voter (London: Batsford, 1968)
- McCalmont's Parliamentary Poll Book of All Elections 1832–1918
- Lewis Namier & John Brooke, The History of Parliament: The House of Commons 1754–1790 (London: HMSO, 1964)
- J E Neale, The Elizabethan House of Commons (London: Jonathan Cape, 1949)
- Henry Pelling, Social Geography of British Elections 1885–1910 (Macmillan, 1967)
- Henry Stooks Smith, The Parliaments of England (1st edition published in three volumes 1844–50), second edition edited (in one volume) by F.W.S. Craig (Political Reference Publications 1973)
- Leigh Rayment's Historical List of MPs – Constituencies beginning with "R" (part 2)
