= Ridlington =

Village in Rutland, England

Coordinates: 52.616°N 0.743°W

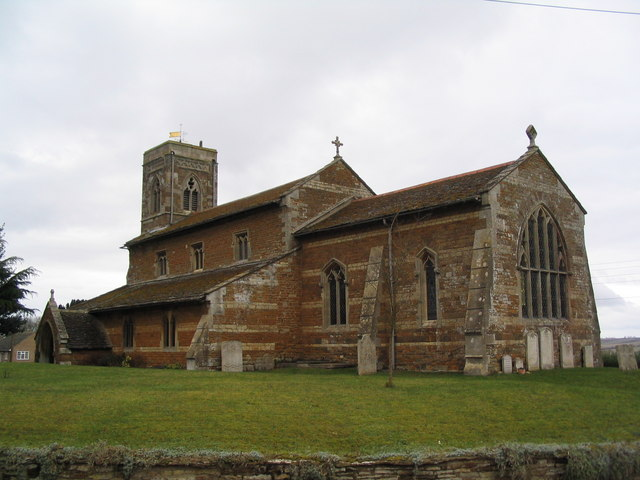
- Church of St Mary Magdalene and St Andrew, Ridlington

- Location within Rutland
- Area: 3.25 sq mi (8.4 km^{2})
- Population: 202. 2001 Census
  - Density: 62/sq mi (24/km^{2})
- OS grid reference: SK852027
  - London: 82 miles (132 km) SSE
- Unitary authority: Rutland
- Shire county: Rutland
- Ceremonial county: Rutland
- Region: East Midlands
- Country: England
- Sovereign state: United Kingdom
- Post town: OAKHAM
- Postcode district: LE15
- Dialling code: 01572
- Police: Leicestershire
- Fire: Leicestershire
- Ambulance: East Midlands
- UK Parliament: Rutland and Stamford

Ridlington is a village and civil parish in Rutland in the East Midlands of England. The population of the village was 202 at the time of the 2001 census, including Ayston, Leighfield and Wardley also increasing to 260 at the 2011 census.

The village's name means 'farm/settlement of Redel'.

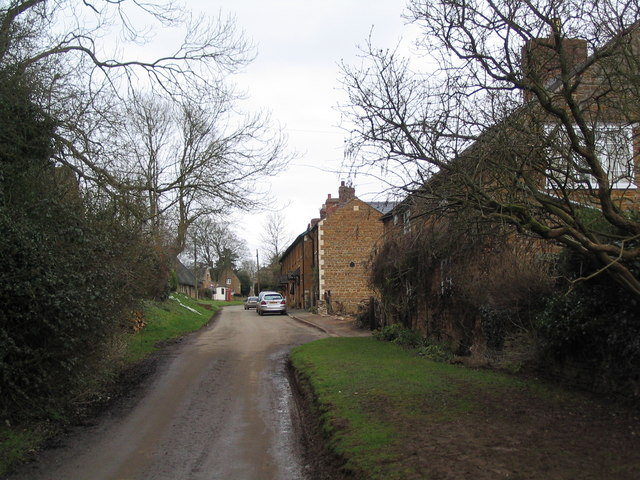
Main street

The Church of St Mary Magdalene and St Andrew is the Church of England parish church. It is a Grade II* listed building.

The Village Hall on Main Street was originally the Ridlington Village Primary School, built in 1873. The Diocese of Peterborough made it over to the Parish Council in 1964 when the school closed.

Ridlington was the home of Hugh Boyville, a landowner and Member of Parliament for Rutland in the 15th century. The prominent Harington family had their seat here and one branch were created the Harington Baronets, of Ridlington in 1611.
