= Mabel Harington =

English courtier

- Died: 1603
- Occupation: Courtier

Mabel Harington (died 1603), was a courtier to Elizabeth I of England and the sixth daughter of Sir James Harington and Lucy Harington, the daughter of Sir William Sidney of Penshurst, Kent. She married Sir Andrew Noel of Dalby and Brooke, having 7 children. Later dying in 1603.

== Biography ==
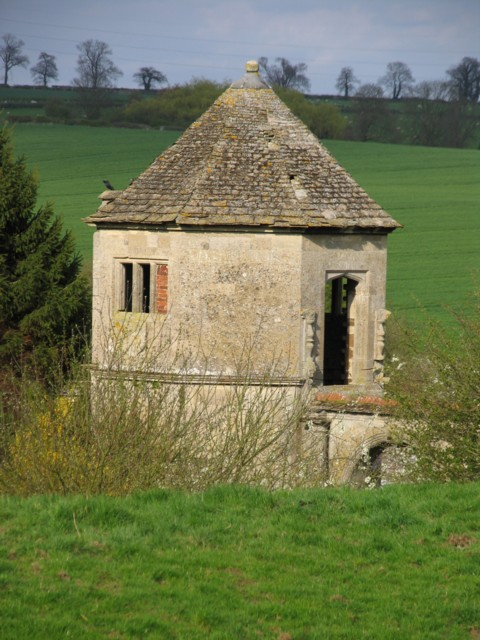
The Octagon lodge of Brooke House, built by the Noel family on the site of Brooke Priory

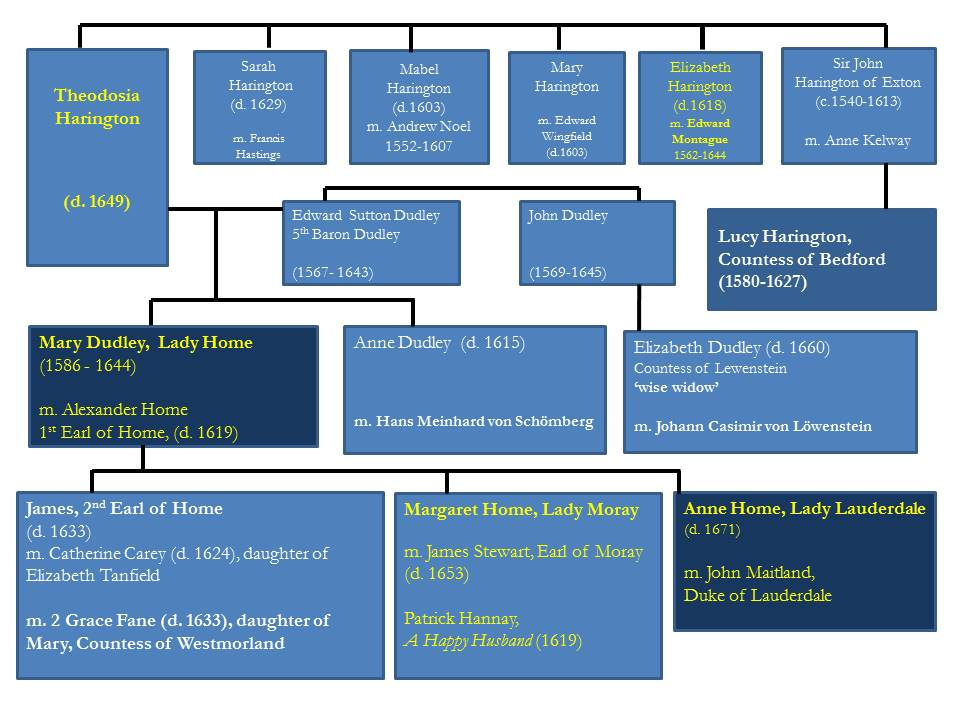
Harington family connections

She married Sir Andrew Noel of Dalby and Brooke (d. 1607), a son of Andrew Noel and Elizabeth Hopton. She was known as "Lady Noel" or "Lady Nowell". Andrew Noel inherited the lands of the former Brooke Priory.

Mabel, Lady Noel, attended the funeral of Mary, Queen of Scots at Peterborough Cathedral in 1587 with her sister Elizabeth, Lady Montagu.

Andrew Noel's brother Henry Noel was a poet, a patron of John Dowland, and said to be a gentleman pensioner to the queen. He died on 28 February 1597 after playing a ball game called baloune at court with an Italian opponent. According to a letter written by Rowland Whyte in April, the queen had been angry at one of her maids of honour Elizabeth Brydges for watching a game of ballon rather than attending to her duties. Brydges was a daughter of Giles Brydges, 3rd Baron Chandos, a probable patron of Henry Noel.

On 23 February 1600 the envoy Louis Verreycken from the Spanish Netherlands had an audience with Queen Elizabeth. The great ladies and "fair maids" of the court, all dressed in white "excellently brave", including Mabel, Lady Noel, and her sisters Sarah, Lady Hastings and Theodosia, Lady Dudley (or her mother-in-law Mary, Lady Dudley), waited in the presence chamber.

Three letters Mabel wrote to her sister Elizabeth Harington, wife of Edward Montagu of Boughton, survive.

She died in 1603.

== Family ==
Mabel's children included;

- Edward Noel (1582-1643), later Viscount Campden, who married Julianna Hicks in 1605, a daughter of Baptist Hicks and his wife Elizabeth May. The disappearance of Julianna Noel's steward William Harrison was known as The Campden Wonder, another steward, Endymion Canning, was buried at Brooke. Edward Noel sold the manor of Dalby to Mary Villiers, Countess of Buckingham in 1617.
- Charles Noel (1591-1619), commemorated by a monument at St Peter's, Brooke, Rutland.
- Arthur Noel
- Alexander Noel of Whitwell, married Mary Palmer daughter of Sir Thomas Palmer of Charlton.
- Lucy Noel, married in 1601 the recusant William Eure, 4th Baron Eure of Ingleby and Malton (1579-1646).
- Elizabeth Noel, married (1) George Tuchet, 1st Earl of Castlehaven, (2) Sir Piers Crosby.
- Theodosia Noel (1578-1618), married Edward Cecil, 1st Viscount Wimbledon.
