= Margaret Harington =

Englishwoman in 16th-century Spain

Margaret Harington (died 1601) an English woman in 16th-century Spain.

== Biography ==
Margaret Harington was third daughter of Sir James Harington and Lucy Sidney, the daughter of Sir William Sidney of Penshurst, Kent.

In July 1559 Margaret Harington left England with her cousin Jane Dormer wife of Gómez Suárez de Figueroa y Córdoba, 1st Duke of Feria, travelling to Mechelen and to Amboise in France, where Mary, Queen of Scots gave a jewel to Dormer, and then remained in the Feria household in Madrid.

Feria's other attendants included; a sister of Sir Edward Stradling, a sister of Sir William Pickering, Mistress Paston who later married Sir Henry Newton, with Susanna White the wife of Thomas Tonge Clarenceux King of Arms and a life-long servant of Mary I of England. In August 1568, William Harington brought a letter from the Duchess of Feria to Elizabeth I.

Margaret Harington married don Benito de Cisneros, with a dowry from the Countess of Feria of 20,000 ducats.

Gustav Ungerer suggests her presence in Madrid would have connected her brother Sir John Harington with Spanish culture, and how this may have informed the perceptions of Africans by the audience of Titus Andronicus, performed at Burley-on-the Hill on 1 January 1596. When the Habsburg envoy Louis Verreycken from the Spanish Netherlands had an audience with Queen Elizabeth on 23 February 1600, Rowland Whyte noted that he was received in the presence chamber by "great ladies" of the court including Margaret's sisters, Mabel, Lady Noel, Sarah, Lady Hastings, and Theodosia, Lady Dudley.

She had two children, Francisco and Maria, who died before her.

She co-founded a monastery in Zafra. She died in Madrid in 1601 and was buried in the church of Santa Marina at Zafra, where the Countess of Feria erected a monument.
