= Robert Cawdrey =

English lexicographer

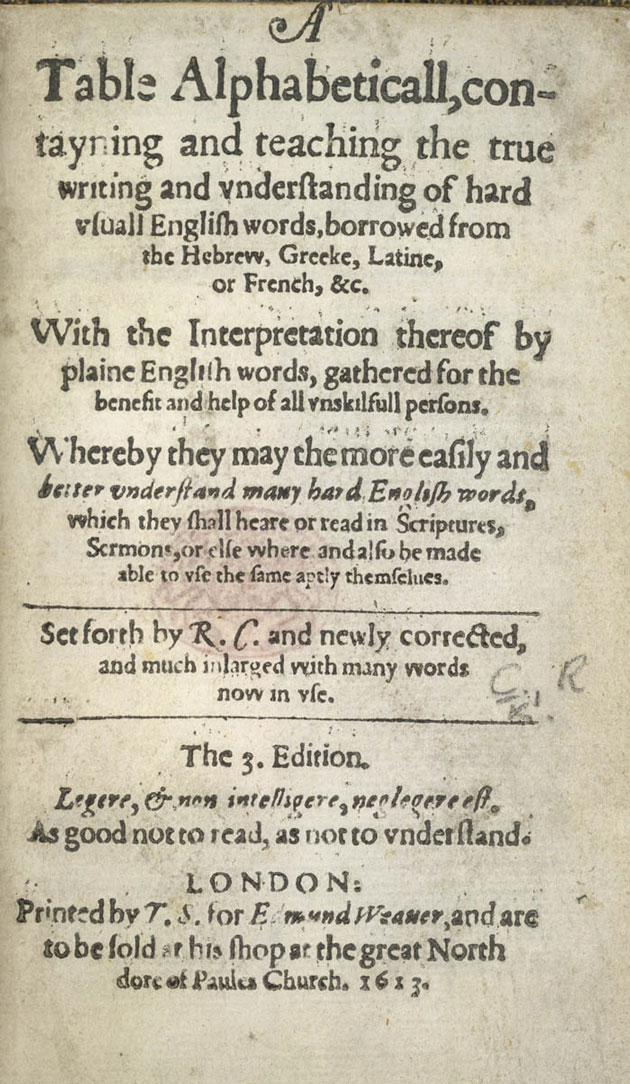
Table Alphabeticall title page (3rd edition)

Robert Cawdrey (ca. 1538 – after 1604) was an English clergyman and author who produced one of the earliest dictionaries of the English language, the Table Alphabeticall, in 1604.

== Career ==
Robert Cawdrey became a school teacher in Oakham, Rutland, in 1563. In 1565, Cawdrey was ordained deacon, and priest in 1570, and on 22 October 1571, he was made rector of South Luffenham in Rutland. Cawdrey was sympathetic to Calvinism and Puritan teachings, which caused trouble with the Church authorities. He viewed the Roman Catholic church as the "whore of Babylon" and eschewed the use of cosmetics.

In 1576, he was chastised for not reading the approved texts in his sermons, and in 1578 he performed a marriage despite not being authorized to do so, and was briefly suspended. His suspension only lasted a few months but, in 1586, he was again chastised for violating the rules and was called before his bishop, Richard Howland. Cawdrey was defended to no avail by his patron, Lord Burghley, and in 1588 Cawdrey was deprived of his rectory, and had to return to teaching to support himself.

== Writing ==
While he was a rector, Robert Cawdrey wrote his Short and Fruitful Treatise of the Profit and Necessity of Catechisms in 1580; he revised this work and published a second edition in 1601. Cawdrey also published A Treasurie or Store-House of Similes in 1600, and again in 1609.

Cawdrey became concerned with the speed at which the English language was changing, caused in part by upper-class Englishmen adopting the languages of French and Italian during their travels on the continent, Cawdrey wrote that "they forget altogether their mothers language, so that if some of their mothers were alive, they were not able to tell or understand what they say."

== A Table Alphabeticall ==
With the assistance of his son Thomas Cawdrey (1575–1640), who was a school teacher in London, Robert Cawdrey created the first monolingual English dictionary, the Table Alphabeticall, which was published in 1604 while Cawdrey was living in Coventry.

The first edition contained just 2,499 words.

Cawdrey's was among the first English dictionaries to utilize alphabetical order, he explained the system in the book. "Nowe if the word, which thou art desirous to finde, begin with (a) then looke in the beginning of this Table, but if with (v) looke towards the end."

Cawdrey dedicated the Table Alphabeticall to five daughters of Lucy Sidney, Lady Harington; Sarah, Lady Hastings, Theodosia, Lady Dudley, Elizabeth, Lady Montagu, Frances, Lady Leigh, and Mary, Lady Wingfield.

The dictionary was re-published in 2007 by the Bodleian Library with an introduction by John Simpson, chief editor of the second edition of the Oxford English Dictionary.

== Life ==
Robert Cawdrey had five sons.

- Thomas Cawdrey (1575–1640)
- Daniel Cawdrey (1588–1664), was a Puritan minister.

== Works ==
- Short and Fruitful Treatise of the Profit and Necessity of Catechisms (first edition, 1580; revised edition, 1601)
- A Godlie Forme of Householde Government (first edition, 1598; "gathered by R.C" and "probably" by Cawdrey)
- A Treasurie or Storehouse of Similies (first edition, 1600)
- A Table Alphabeticall (first edition, 1604)
