= Edward Wingfield of Kimbolton =

Member of Parliament

Sir Edward Wingfield of Kimbolton (c.1562–1603), member of Parliament and author of a masque.

The son of Thomas Wingfield of Kimbolton and Honora Denny, he was member of Parliament for Huntingdonshire in 1586, 1589, and 1593.

Wingfield married Mary Harington, a daughter of Sir James Harington and Lucy Sidney, the daughter of Sir William Sidney of Penshurst.

A letter from Jacques Petit to Anthony Bacon of January 1596 mentions a New Year's Eve masque of Wingfield's invention and a performance of Titus Andronicus at Burley-on-the-Hill the home of his brother-in-law Sir John Harington of Exton, organised by his daughter Lucy Russell, Countess of Bedford. Wingfield's masque was presumably produced and performed by the family, featuring the Countess of Bedford, while Shakespeare's play was performed by professionals, the Lord Chamberlain's Men, the "London comedians" in Petit's phrase.

Mary, Lady Wingfield, with her sisters, was a patron of literature. In 1600 Sir William Cornwallis younger published his Essayes with a letter of dedication by Henry Olney to three of the Harington sisters; "the Lady Sara Hastings, the Lady Theodosia Dudley, the Lady Mary Wingfield", and their friend and cousin Lady Mary Dyer (d. 1601), the wife of Sir Richard Dyer of Great Staughton.

Robert Cawdrey dedicated his dictionary, the Table Alphabeticall to five daughters of Lucy Sidney, Lady Harington; Sarah, Lady Hastings, Theodosia, Lady Dudley, Elizabeth, Lady Montagu, Frances, Lady Leigh, and Mary, Lady Wingfield.

== Death ==
Edward Wingfield died in 1603. Mary, Lady Wingfield was still alive in 1628 when she was the executrix of William Mason of Westminster, who left legacies to several female members of the Harington/Sidney family including diamond rings for the Countess of Home, Sarah Stanhope, and Lady Dyer and the young Lady Dyer. Mason owned portrait miniatures of Catherine, Countess of Chesterfield, Sarah, Lady Hastings, and Theodosia, Lady Dudley.

== Family ==
The children of Edward Wingfield and Mary Harington included;

- Arthur Wingfield (d. 1617), who was a page to Lucy, Countess of Bedford, then a servant of Elizabeth Stuart, Queen of Bohemia and Maurice, Prince of Orange. He was involved in a duel fought at Calais in 1616, and was killed in another duel in 1617.
- Robert Wingfield, a servant of Robert Cecil, 1st Earl of Salisbury in 1607 until March 1608.
- Penelope Wingfield (d. 1625), married Sir Francis Bodenham.
