= Elizabeth Harington =

English aristocrat

Elizabeth Harington, Lady Montagu (died in 1618) was an English aristocrat.

== Life ==
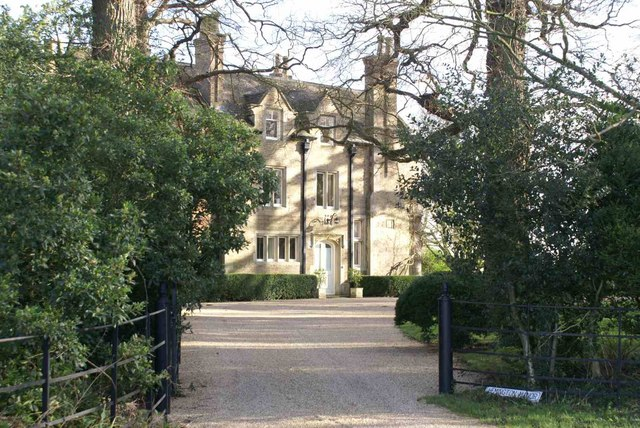
Hemington Manor also known as Beaulieu Hall, Lady Montagu's home

Elizabeth Harington was the daughter of James Harington of Exton and Lucy Sidney, the daughter of Sir William Sidney of Penshurst, Kent. Three of Elizabeth's letters to her sister Mabel Noel are preserved, attesting to the literary culture of their childhood home. In 1557 she married Edward Montagu of Boughton, near Kettering. Elizabeth and her husband attended the funeral of Mary, Queen of Scots at Peterborough Cathedral in 1587. Her aunt, Frances, Countess of Sussex, bequeathed her a gown of black velvet embroidered with broken trees, and left her husband Edward a suite of tapestry depicting the story of Judith and Holofernes.

After her husband died in 1602, Elizabeth lived at Hemington. Though her eyesight deteriorated with age, she continued to work on her embroidery. In July 1616, when King James came to hunt in nearby Geddington woods during his progress through Northamptonshire, her eldest son Edward showed the King a handkerchief that his mother had sewn as a "wonder", and they spoke of her good works and piety.

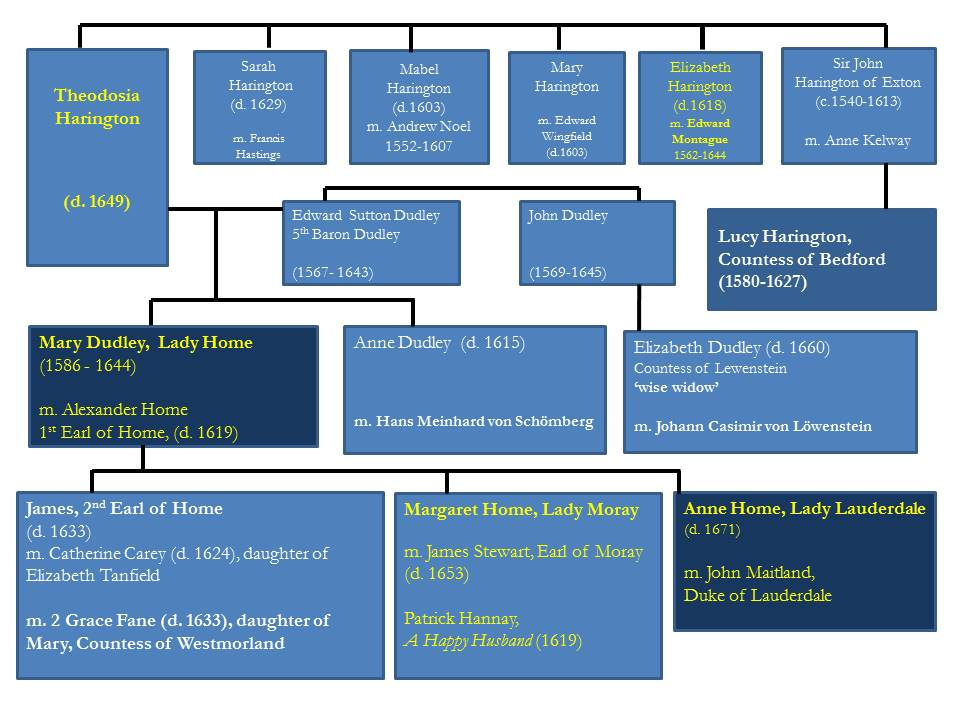
Harington family connections

Elizabeth Montagu died on 19 May 1618.

== Will and bequests ==
Amongst the bequests in her will, she gave pieces of unicorn horn set in gold to her daughter Elizabeth, Lady Willoughby, and to Sarah, Lady Zouche. She left a "Booke of goulde" to her granddaughter Bessie Capell, and some items of silver plate to Theodosia, Lady Dudley, including a silver pot for her "uscubath", meaning whisky: uisge beatha or usquebaugh. She gave a velvet cabinet with a purse of gold coins in one of its drawers or "boxes" to Theodosia's daughter, Margaret Dudley Hobart. She gave Anne, Lady Harington a silver "posnet" dish and cover which had belonged to Mary, Queen of Scots.

Mary, Queen of Scots, owned a silver posnet, which she used for "bouillon" or broth at Wingfield Manor. It was listed in 1587 at Fotheringhay amongst silver in the keeping of Elizabeth Curle, sister of Gilbert Curle, said to have been Mary's gift to her priest.

== Family ==
Her children included:

- Edward Montagu, 1st Baron Montagu of Boughton
- Henry Montagu, 1st Earl of Manchester
- Sir Charles Montagu
- James Montagu, Bishop of Winchester.
- Sir Sidney Montagu, ancestor of the Earls of Sandwich.
- Lucy Montagu who married Sir William Wray, 1st Baronet, of Glentworth
- Elizabeth Montagu, who married Robert Bertie
- Theodosia Montagu, who married Sir Henry Capell, their son was Arthur Capell, 1st Baron Capell of Hadham
