= Richard Dyer (disambiguation) =

Richard Dyer (born 1945) is an English academic.

Richard Dyer may also refer to:

- Richard Dyer (music critic) (1941–2024), American music critic
- Richard Dyer (footballer) (born 1968), Montserratian association football player
- Richard Dyer (d. 1605), English courtier, soldier, and landowner

== See also ==
- Rick Dyer (disambiguation)
- Richard Dyer-Bennet (1913–1991), English-born American folk singer
