= Theodosia Harington =

English aristocrat

- Lady Dudley
- Died: 1649
- Spouse(s): Edward Sutton, 5th Baron Dudley
- Issue: Ferdinando Sutton; Mary Sutton, Countess of Home; Anne Sutton; Margaret Sutton; Theodosia Sutton
- Father: James Harington

Theodosia Harington, Lady Dudley (died 1649) was an English aristocrat who was abandoned by her husband, but maintained connections at court through her extensive family networks.

== Early life ==
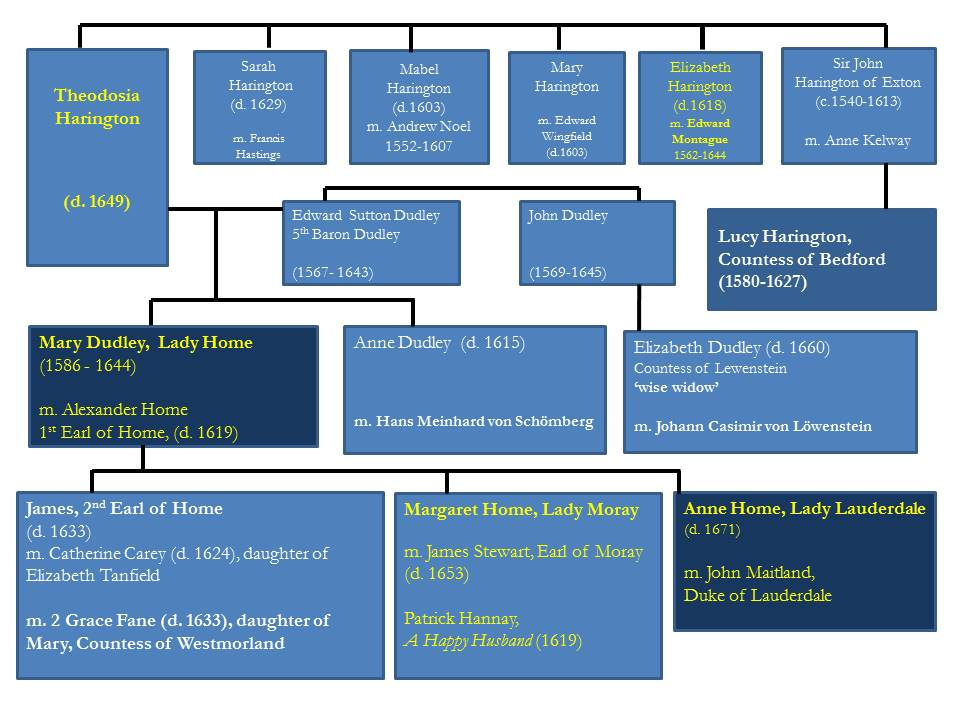
Harington Dudley family connections

She was the eighth daughter of Sir James Harington of Exton, Rutland, a lawyer and long-serving MP, and Lucy Sidney of Penshurst. The Haringtons were the most important landowners in Rutland and her eldest brother, John, was created Baron Harington of Exton in 1603.

Harington had several sisters who married and increased their social network. According to the inscription on her father's tomb at Exton, Rutland, Harington was the eighth and youngest daughter.

== Lady Dudley and Princess Elizabeth ==
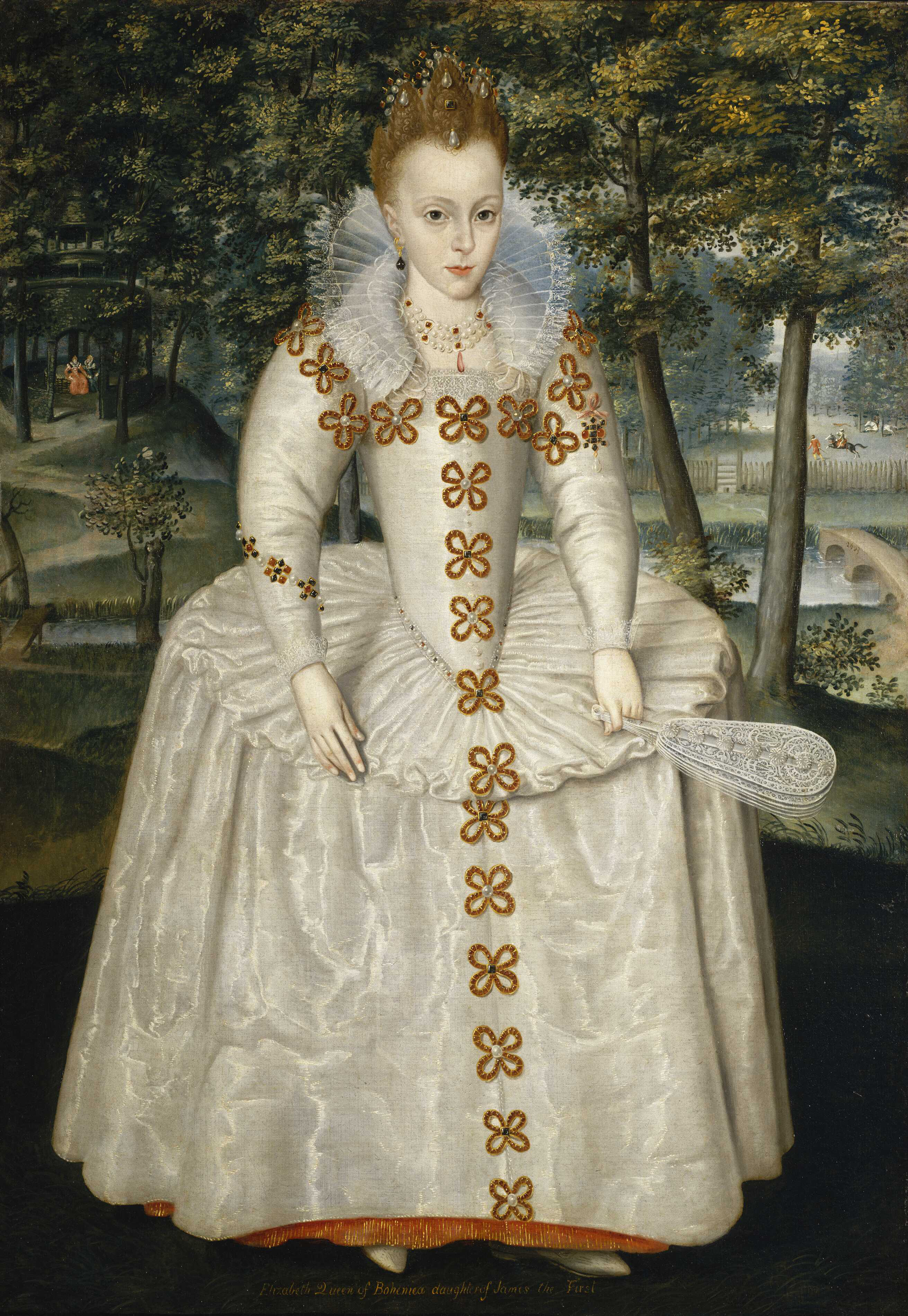
Theodosia Harington, Lady Dudley, became a member of Princess Elizabeth's household at Coombe Abbey

In 1581 she married Edward Sutton, 5th Baron Dudley (1567-1643). She was afterwards usually known as "Lady Dudley" or "Theodosia Dudley". The family surname "Sutton" was only rarely used. They had five children.

She attended the funeral of Mary, Queen of Scots at Peterborough in 1587.

Lady Anne Clifford said Harington and her mother Margaret Clifford, Countess of Cumberland had been friends.

Her husband abandoned her for Elizabeth Tomlinson. According to a bill produced in the Star Chamber by his rival in Staffordshire, Gilbert Lyttelton, in 1592 he had "left that virtuous lady his wife in London without sustenance, and took to his home a lewd and infamous woman, a base collier's daughter". In 1597 her son Ferdinando and daughter Anne were lodged in Clerkenwell as wards of her sister Elizabeth Harington and uncle Edward Montagu of Boughton. The Privy Council made arrangements for a settlement and payments but Lord Dudley refused to pay her, instead sending an installment of £30 for his debt of £240..

On 23 February 1600 Louis Verreycken an envoy from the Spanish Netherlands was received by Elizabeth I of England. Several great ladies of the court waited in the presence chamber, dressed all in white. These included her sisters Lady Hastings and Mabel, Lady Noel, with a "Lady Dudley" who was either herself or her mother-in-law Mary, Lady Dudley.

In 1600 Sir William Cornwallis younger published his Essayes with a dedicatory letter by Henry Olney to three of the Harington sisters; "the Lady Sara Hastings, the Lady Theodosia Dudley, the Lady Mary Wingfield", and their friend and cousin Lady Mary Dyer (d. 1601), the wife of Sir Richard Dyer of Great Staughton. Robert Cawdrey dedicated his dictionary, the Table Alphabeticall (London, 1604) to five daughters of Lucy Sidney, Lady Harington; Sarah, Lady Hastings, Theodosia, Lady Dudley, Elizabeth, Lady Montagu, Frances, Lady Leigh, and Mary, Lady Wingfield.

After the Union of the Crowns in 1603, Theodosia Harington's family connections, particularly to her niece the courtier Lucy Russell, Countess of Bedford, secured positions for her daughter Anne (Dudley) Sutton, usually known as "Mistress Dudley", and her niece Elizabeth Dudley as ladies in waiting to Princess Elizabeth, and probably the marriage of her eldest daughter Mary to the Scottish Earl of Home in 1605. Theodosia Harington seems to have been an important member of Princess Elizabeth's household and before their marriage in London, Frederick V of the Palatinate gave her a valuable gift of silver plate.

Anne Dudley featured in Henry Peacham's emblem book Minerva Britanna, compared to the chaste Diana with an Italian anagram of her name, "e l'nuda Diana". Anne with seven other ladies put their names in hat to award kisses to winners at a tournament for Prince Henry in April 1612.

== Later life ==
In 1626 Harington sold a large diamond to Charles I of England for £1,700. In 1628 her friend William Mason of Westminster left her a legacy of £600, "as a pledge of my unfeigned heart, to her unstained honour, wishing every penny of it were a thousand pound". Acknowledging her marital difficulties, Mason asked his executrix, Harington's sister Sarah, Lady Hastings (by now Lady Edmondes), to ensure that she, not Lord Dudley, received the money. Mason left legacies to Theodosia's daughters, and to other members of the Harington/Sidney family, including Anne Dyer, Lady Carr Cromwell and Theodosia, Lady Bodenham. He owned portrait miniatures of Theodosia Harington, Lady Hastings, and Lady Chesterfield, in gold cases enamelled with green.

More books were dedicated to her and her sisters, including John Brinsley's The Fourth Part of the True Watch (London, 1624). She was the patron of a Mr Richard Sherwood, who wrote a short treatise about marriage for her. Patrick Hannay dedicated his A Happy Husband, or Directions for a Maide to choose her Mate, as also a Wives behaviour towards her Husband after Marriage (Edinburgh, 1619) to her granddaughter, Margaret Home, later Countess of Moray.

In February 1639 Lord Arundel of Wardour noted she was living at court, and the Earl of Arundel owed her £3,000. In October 1648 she was in London as a guest of her granddaughter Anne Maitland, Countess of Lauderdale.

She died at Norwich, the home of her daughter Margaret Hobart, in 1649 or 1650, and was buried at St Margaret's, Westminster on 12 January 1650.

== Lady Dudley's will ==
She made her will on 11 September 1649. She had lent £5 to the Scots Army and £150 to Parliament. She left a farm at Playsted Marshall and land at Hemlinton near Norwich to her Hobart grandsons. She left a piece of silver plate to her "noble freinde and loveinge niece the Countisse of Livenstayne". This was her niece Elizabeth Dudley, daughter of John Dudley, Countess of Löwenstein, and a lady in waiting to Elizabeth Stuart, Queen of Bohemia, known as the "Wise Widow", or "Dutch Bess Dudly" or "Dulcinea". Further documents and charters relating to Theodosia Dudley's property are held by the National Library of Scotland in the Tweeddale papers.

A portrait of "Theodosia lady Duddeley", attributed to Cornelius Johnson was formerly at Castle Donington.

== Family ==
Theodosia, Lady Dudley had a son and four daughters:

- Ferdinando Sutton (1588–1621), who married Honora Seymour, a daughter of Edward Seymour, Viscount Beauchamp.
- Mary Sutton (1586–1645), who married Alexander Home, 1st Earl of Home.
- Anne Sutton, known as "Mistress Dudley", (died December 1615), "Mistress Dudley", lady in waiting to Elizabeth Stuart, Queen of Bohemia who married on 23 March 1615 Hans Meinhard von Schönberg, the Palatine Ambassador to England, she died of a fever after giving birth to Frederick Schomberg, 1st Duke of Schomberg.
- Margaret Sutton (1597-1674), who married Sir Miles Hobart of Fleet Street and Plumstead, a son of Henry Hobart of Plumstead and Willoughby Hopton, a daughter of Arthur Hopton of Blythburgh and Witham. They had sons Miles, Tom, John and James. She was buried at St Margaret's, Westminster. There were several people called "Miles Hobart" in this period. A letter to Dorothy Hobart from 1626 was discovered at Lauderdale House in Highgate, a house that belonged to Theodosia Harington's daughter, Mary.
- Theodosia Sutton.
