= Edmund Weiner =

English lexicographer

Edmund S. C. Weiner (born 27 August 1950 in Oxford, England) is the former co-editor (with John A. Simpson) of the Second Edition of the Oxford English Dictionary (1985–1989) and Deputy Chief Editor of the Oxford English Dictionary (1993–present). He originally joined the OED staff in 1977, becoming the dictionary's chief philologist.

Previously, he taught Old English, Middle English and English linguistic history at Christ Church, Oxford, where he undertook doctorate research on the Wycliffite Psalter Commentary. He is now a Fellow of Kellogg College, Oxford.

At Oxford, Weiner prepared an Oxford Miniguide to English Usage (1983) in preparation for the imminent promotion to senior editor on the OED in 1982. In this role, Weiner supervised ten assistant editors drafting dictionary entries. Following the publication of the fourth volume of the Supplement to the OED in 1986, Weiner transferred to the revision of the New Shorter OED. In Spring 1986, both Edmund Weiner and John Simpson were promoted to co-editor of the OED, following the retirement of Bob Burchfield.

Edmund Weiner was among a group of several people (John Simpson, Yvonne Warburton, Julia Swannell, Veronica Hurst) who prepared the publication of the OED2 in 1989. Weiner, with the assistance of the computer types supplied by the OUP, IBM, and Waterloo University (Canada), devised a method of transferring the OED’s text onto computer. Due to the format of the dictionary, involving gaps and incomplete entries, the non-compromising method of Weiner’s was significant in the development of the modern OED. Once Weiner became the co-editor of the OED (1986), Weiner himself was responsible for overseeing the twelve volumes of the OED (1884-1928), and four volumes of the more recent Supplement be entered into the computer. In 1989, Weiner and Simpson were part of a publicity stunt in which they featured the new OED2 on CD-ROM.

The OUP team led by Ed Weiner and John Simpson reviewed, corrected, and edited the new electronic ‘OED2’ in time for the targeted publishing year of 1989. They added 5,000 new words and senses, to 400,000 definitions, resulting in 60 million total words. New software compiled by the University of Waterloo, Canada, compiled 85% of the workload; However, 15% required the expertise of the editors. The result was the publication of the Oxford English Dictionary, Second Edition, consisting of a total 22,000 pages and 20 volumes.

In 1993, Weiner’s time as co-editor to the OED came to an end. He opted for a deputy position, due to his desire “in writing the dictionary rather than managing its composition”. In his new role, he contributes to the Oxford English Dictionary Additions series (1993-). This new work is, according to the introduction of the first volume, the result of a “work-in-progress on new entries for the OED” for the forthcoming (as of 2022) third edition. Weiner also works on multiple editions of The Oxford Dictionary of English Grammar (1994, 1998, 2014) which is another continually developing work meant to provide a guide for the complex nuances of English grammar.

As well as writing or compiling a number of books on English grammar and usage, he co-authored a book on Tolkien: The Ring of Words: Tolkien and the Oxford English Dictionary (by Peter Gilliver, Jeremy Marshall and Edmund Weiner, Oxford University Press, 2006, ISBN 0-19-861069-6), analysing the relationship between J.R.R. Tolkien and the OED. He and Marshall also contributed a chapter on Tolkien's invented languages to From Elvish to Klingon (edited by Michael Adams, Oxford University Press, 2011, ISBN 978-0-19-280709-0).

The OED website blog was last actively used by Weiner in 2020, publishing multiple blog entries since his first “Early Modern English Pronunciation and Spelling” on August 16, 2012. Since then, has contributed several entries, including release notes on dictionary entries: “Release notes: hi-fi, sci-fi, DIY”. Most recently, he has posted “Digitizing the OED: The Making of the Second Edition” (15 Jan 2019), and “A bear of many brains: the revision of bear, n. 1” (8 April 2020).
