= Balderdash and Piffle =

British television programme

- Created by: BBC
- Starring: Victoria Coren et al.
- No. of episodes: 15 (+1 follow-up)

Production
- Producer: Takeaway Media
- Running time: 30 Minutes

Original release
- Network: BBC Two
- Release: 2 January 2006 – 6 July 2007

Balderdash and Piffle is a British television programme on BBC in which the writers of the Oxford English Dictionary asked the public for help in finding the origins and first known citations of a number of words and phrases. Presented by Victoria Coren, it was a companion to the dictionary's Wordhunt project.

The OED panel consisted of John Simpson, the Chief Editor of the OED; Peter Gilliver, who was also the captain of the Oxford University Press team in University Challenge: The Professionals; and etymologist Tania Styles, who previously appeared in "Dictionary Corner" on Countdown.

== Series 1 ==
The first series of Balderdash and Piffle was originally broadcast in January 2006. Each programme was based around a letter; the first season covered the letters P, M, N, S, C, and B in that order. Following the conclusion of the first series, a follow-up seventh episode aired on 16 April 2006 with updates on the discoveries members of the public had made, resulting in several further changes to the dictionary.

== Series 2 ==
A new Wordhunt began in January 2007 and the results featured in the second series of the programme which premiered on Friday 11 May at 10pm on BBC Two.

The second series was divided thematically, with examples such as "Man's best friend" or "Put downs and Insults". Victoria Coren was joined by guest reporters who attempted to trace the etymology and first documentary use of words, based on suggestions from the British public. Victoria Coren then took the evidence they had found to a panel of OED staff, who decided whether this evidence was sufficient to include in the dictionary.

== The books ==
Balderdash and Piffle is also the name given to two books written by Alex Games. The first, titled Balderdash and Piffle was published by BBC Books in 2006. A second book, also by Alex Games and published by BBC Books, is titled Balderdash and Piffle: One sandwich short of a dog's dinner and accompanied the second series of the show.

The two books explore the origins of a number of words in the English language, including randy, shampoo and bouncy castle.

Balderdash & Piffle
- Author: Alex Games and Victoria Coren
- Cover artist: Smith & Gilmour, London
- Language: English
- Subject: Etymology
- Publisher: BBC Books
- Publication date: 2006
- Media type: Print (Paperback)
- Pages: 304
- ISBN: 0-563-49336-4
- OCLC: 67864613

Balderdash & Piffle: One Sandwich Short of a Dog's Dinner
- Author: Alex Games and Victoria Coren
- Language: English
- Subject: Etymology
- Publisher: BBC Books
- Publication date: 2006
- Media type: Print (Hardback)
- Pages: 304
- ISBN: 978-1-84607-235-2
