= Katherine Doyley Dyer =

Katherine Doyley Dyer (b.c. 1585-1654) notable for the epitaph she placed on her husband's tomb at Colmworth, Bedfordshire, England

Doyley was one of the four daughters of John Doyley (d. 1593) and Anne Barnard, and was a co-heir of the Doyley estate at Merton. After the death of John Doyley, in 1601, her sister Margaret Doyley married Edward Harington of Ridlington and her mother Anne Barnard married James Harington (1542–1614), the father of Edward Harington, in a double wedding. Her other sisters were Anne and Elizabeth.

On 25 February 1602 Katherine Doyley married Sir William Dyer, son of Sir Richard Dyer of Great Staughton.

Sir William died on 9 April 1621. In 1641 Katherine placed the epitaph, which she may have composed, known as "My Dearest Dust" on their monument at the Church of St Denys, Colmworth.

If a large hart, joined with a noble minde
Shewing true worth unto all good inclin’d
If faith in friendship, justice unto all,
Leave such a memory as we may call
Happy, thine is; then pious marble keepe
His just fame waking, though his lov’d dust sleepe.
And though death can devoure all that hath breath,
And monuments them selves have had a death,
Nature shan’t suffer this, to ruinate,
Nor time demolish’t, nor an envious fate,
Rais’d by a just hand, not vain glorious pride,
Who’d be concealed, wer’t modesty to hide
Such an affection did so long survive
The object of ’t; yet lov’d it as alive.
And this greate blessing to his name doth give
To make it by his tombe, and issue live.

My dearest dust, could not thy hasty day
Afford thy drowsy patience leave to stay
One hour longer, so that we might either
Have sat up or gone to bed together?
But since thy finished labour hath possessed
Thy weary limbs with early rest,
Enjoy it sweetly, and thy widow bride
Shall soon repose her by thy slumbering side,
Whose business now is only to prepare
My nightly dress and call to prayer.
Mine eyes wax heavy, and the day grows old,
The dew falls thick, my blood grows cold,
Draw, draw the closed curtains and make room,
My dear, my dearest dust, I come, I come.

In her will, Katherine mentioned, "her losses had become very great since those last troubles" of the Civil War. She died in 1654.

== Family ==
The seven children of Katherine Doyley Dyer and William Dyer commemorated by effigy on the tomb at Colmworth were;

- Sir Ludowick Dyer (10 March 1606-1670), who married Elizabeth Yelverton, and was the first and last Dyer baronet of Staughton. Katherine and Elizabeth were mentioned with other women of the Harington / Sidney family in the will of William Mason of Westminster in 1630. Ludowick and Elizabeth's only son Henry died in 1637 and is commemorated on the monument at Colmworth.
- Doyley Dyer (1613-1684).
- Richard Dyer (b. 1608) married Elizabeth (d. 1685).
- James Dyer (b. 1617).
- Anne or Anna Dyer (1611-1684), married William Gery of Bushmead Priory. Their children included; William, Richard, Katherine, Ann, and Mary
- Katherine Dyer (b. 1619), married Sir Edward Coke of Longford, Derbyshire.
- Mary Dyer, married a Mr Wardour.
