= William Cornwallis (disambiguation) =

William Cornwallis (1744–1819) was a British admiral.

William Cornwallis may also refer to:

- William Cornwallis (died 1614), early English essayist
- William Cornwallis (died 1611), English courtier and politician
