= Peter Gilliver =

British lexicographer (born 1964)

- Born: Middlesbrough, Yorkshire, England
- Occupation: Lexicographer

Peter Gilliver is a lexicographer and associate editor of the Oxford English Dictionary.

== Career ==
In 2016 Gilliver published a history of the OED, which took most of the previous decade to write.

He and his partner sing in various choirs, including the Oxford Bach Choir (which they came to administer by 2021), and Fiori Musicali.

Gilliver, a longtime editor who also seems to be the OED's resident historian, points out that the dictionary feels obliged to include words that many would regard simply as misspellings. No one is particularly proud of the new entry as of December 2003 for nucular, a word not associated with high standards of diction. "I was amazed to find that the spelling n-u-c-u-l-a-r has decades of history," Gilliver says. "And that is not to be confused with the quite different word, nucular, meaning 'of or relating to a nucule.'"

— "Cyber-neologoliferation", James Gleick, The New York Times, 5 November 2006

== Credits ==
=== Television ===
Title	Role	Production	Date
Balderdash and Piffle	OED Panel	BBC	2006–2007
University Challenge: The Professionals	OUP Captain	BBC	12 July & 6 September 2004
Imagine: An A-Z of the OED	OED Historian	BBC	18 December 2003

== Publications ==
- Gilliver, Peter (1995). "At the Wordface: J. R. R. Tolkien's work on the Oxford English Dictionary". In Reynolds, Patricia (ed.). Proceedings of the J. R. R. Tolkien Centenary Conference, 1992. Milton Keynes: Mythopoeic Press/Tolkien Society. pp. 173–186. ISBN 1-887726-04-7.
- ————— (2000). "Appendix II: OED personalia". In Mugglestone, Lynda (ed.). Lexicography and the Oxford English Dictionary: pioneers in the untrodden forest. Oxford: Oxford University Press. pp. 232–52. ISBN 0-19-925195-9.
- ————— (2004). "That brownest of brown studies: the work of the editors and in-house staff of the Oxford English Dictionary in 1903" (PDF). Dictionaries: Journal of the Dictionary Society of North America. 25: 44–64. ISSN 0197-6745.
- ————— (2006). "Billy Sunday: a new source for "oxen of the sun"". James Joyce Quarterly. 44 (1). University of Tulsa: 133. doi:10.1353/jjq.2007.0010. OCLC 144575793.
- ————— Marshall, Jeremy; Weiner, Edmund (2006). The Ring of Words: Tolkien and the Oxford English Dictionary. Oxford: Oxford University Press. ISBN 978-0199568369.
- ————— (2007). "The Great Un- Crisis: An Unknown Episode in the History of the OED". In Considine, John; Iamartino, Giovanni (eds.). Words and Dictionaries from the British Isles in Historical Perspective. Newcastle: Cambridge Scholars Publishing. pp. 166–177. ISBN 978-1-84718-168-8.
- ————— (2016). "Breaking the code". Oxford English Dictionary.
- ————— (2016). The Making of the Oxford English Dictionary. Oxford: Oxford University Press. ISBN 9780199283620.

== See also ==
- Oxford English Dictionary
- John Simpson (lexicographer)
- Edmund Weiner
