= Richard Dyer (d. 1605) =

Sir Richard Dyer of Staughton (died 1605), was an English courtier, soldier, and landowner.

Richard Dyer was the son of Laurence Dyer and Jane Southe, he was a gentleman of the privy chamber to King James I.

He was the heir of his great-uncle, Sir James Dyer.

He lived at Place House, Great Staughton in Huntingdonshire.

Dyer married Mary or Marie Fitzwilliam (c. 1556-1601), a daughter of Sir William Fitzwilliam and Anne or Agnes Sidney (1523-1602), a daughter of Sir William Sidney of Penshurst Place and Anne Pakenham.

In June 1586 Sir Philip Sidney recommended "his cousin" Sir Richard Dyer as "very valiant" to Francis Walsingham; "I beseech you both countenance and favour him".

Dyer was said to be at Tilbury in 1588, and Queen Elizabeth is supposed to have visited Place House.

William Cornwallis published his Essayes in 1600, with a dedicatory letter by Henry Olney addressed to Mary, Lady Dyer, and her friends and cousins, the three daughters of Lucy Sidney; Lady Sara Hastings, Lady Theodosia Dudley, and Lady Mary Wingfield. The Wingfields lived at Kimbolton, close to Staughton. Mary, Lady Dyer, gave a silver bottle for travelling to her cousin, Elizabeth Harington, Lady Montagu (d. 1616), and she bequeathed it to her manservant for remembrance.

Richard Dyer died in 1605. There is a double monument to Sir James Dyer and his wife Margaret Barrowe and Sir Richard Dyer and Mary Fitzwilliam in the church at Great Staughton.

== Family ==
Richard Dyer and Mary Dyer had children including;

- James Dyer (d. 1599).
- Sir William Dyer (1583 - 9 April 1621), married 25 February 1602 Catherine Doyley, Lady Dyer (b.c. 1575-1654), and they were buried in the church of St Denys, Colmworth, Bedfordshire, where the epitaph she composed "My Dearest Dust" is carved on their monument.
  - Sir Ludowick Dyer (10 March 1606-1670), who married Elizabeth Yelverton, and was the first and last Dyer baronet of Staughton. His son only son Henry died in 1637 and is commemorated on the monument at Colmworth.
  - Doyley Dyer (1613-1684).
  - Richard Dyer (b. 1608) married Elizabeth (d. 1685).
  - James Dyer (b. 1617).
  - Anne Dyer (1611-1684), married William Gery of Bushmeade Priory.
  - Katherine Dyer (b. 1619), married Sir Edward Coke of Longford, Derbyshire.
  - Mary Dyer, married a Mr Wardour.
- Francis Dyer.
- Richard Dyer (b. 1588), who suffered from a continual "hissing in his head", and consulted Richard Napier on his marriage plans, business ideas, and choice of friends.
- Edward Dyer, born 11 July 1594.
- (Lucy) Anna Dyer (d. 1639), married (1) in 1607 Edward Carr (d. 1618) of Sleaford, (2) in 1619 Henry Cromwell of Ramsey Abbey, and was known as "Lady Carr Cromwell". Anne's notebook records the baptisms of her children, and godparents including Lucy Russell, Countess of Bedford. Their only surviving son was Henry Cromwell alias Williams (1625-1673). She was said to be a Catholic in 1618.
