= Henry Noel (courtier) =

16th-century English politician

Henry Noel or Nowell (died 1597) was an English courtier and member of Parliament for Morpeth in the parliament of 1589 and Cricklade in 1593.

He was a younger son of Andrew Noel of Dalby and Brooke and Elizabeth Hopton. His brother Andrew Noel (died 1607) was member of Parliament for Rutland.

Henry Noel was a poet, a patron of the composer John Dowland, and said to be a gentleman pensioner to the queen.

The lawyer John Manningham recorded in his diary that Walter Raleigh made a pun on his name "Noe - L" to criticise him as a spendthrift:

The word of denial and the letter of fifty,
Makes the gentleman's name that will never be thrifty.

He died on 26 February 1597 from a fever after playing a ball game called baloune at court with an Italian opponent.

Thomas Fuller is the source for this game of "baloune". Few details are known of the game, which is said to have been played in a court with a heavy ball, and the players were equipped with wooden arm braces. There is another story involving "ballon" at the English court from 1597. Two ladies in waiting, Elizabeth Brydges, the "fair Mistress Brydges", and "Mrs Russell" (Elizabeth Russell, daughter of Elizabeth Cooke, Lady Russell) took physic, pretending to be ill to avoid their duties, and went together through the privy galleries of the palace to watch men "playing at balloon". Queen Elizabeth was very angry and used "words and blows" against Brydges, and both women were suspended from their duties for three days.

Noel was buried in St Andrew's Chapel, Westminster Abbey, in February 1597. Dowland wrote "Lamentatio Henrici Noel" for the funeral. Later, Thomas Morley and Thomas Weelkes also provided musical tributes.
