= The Ring of Words: Tolkien and the Oxford English Dictionary =

2006 account of J. R. R. Tolkien as lexicographer

- Authors: Peter Gilliver, Jeremy Marshall and Edmund Weiner
- Language: English
- Publisher: Oxford University Press
- Publication date: 2006
- Publication place: United Kingdom
- Media type: Print (hardback)
- Pages: 240
- ISBN: 0-19-861069-6
- Website: OUP website

The Ring of Words: Tolkien and the Oxford English Dictionary is a 2006 book by three editors of the Oxford English Dictionary, Peter Gilliver, Jeremy Marshall and Edmund Weiner. It examines J. R. R. Tolkien's brief period working as a lexicographer with the OED after World War I, traces his use of philology as it is apparent in his writings, and in particular in his legendarium, and finally examines in detail over 100 words that he used, developed or invented.

Tolkien himself acknowledged the importance of this part of his career, stating "I learned more in those two years than in any other equal period of my life" (even though it lasted barely eighteen months, from the end of 1918 to the spring of 1920).

The title is taken from R. L. Stevenson's Songs of Travel and Other Verses No. XIV, quoted on the title page:

Bright is the ring of words
When the right man rings them,
Fair the fall of songs
When the singer sings them.

== Book ==
Part I: "Tolkien as Lexicographer" describes Tolkien's work as an Assistant Editor on the dictionary. He would sort through the raw materials—slips of paper containing examples of the use of words from documents covering many centuries—and disentangle the development of different shades of meaning over time. He would then start to compose a dictionary entry explaining the origins and development of each word. Some of Tolkien's manuscript notes, for words like warm, waggle, wain and waistcoat are reproduced. Tolkien's first published work: A Middle English Vocabulary, is described with the note that "Undoubtedly, it was the rigorous discipline of his OED service that enabled Tolkien to compile a glossary that is unparalleled for its concision, informativeness, and accuracy." (Peter Gilliver presented an earlier account of this period in Tolkien's life to the J. R. R. Tolkien Centenary Conference, and subsequently published in Mythlore.)

Part II: "Tolkien as Wordwright" traces ways in which Tolkien's philology—his love and understanding of words and language—shaped and nourished both his academic and his literary work. He could trace words back in history, and deduce their unrecorded original forms, and he could follow words through time as they developed new meanings. He could revive an ancient word in a form that made sense to modern readers (shieldmaiden), or create a completely new meaning for a forgotten word (ent).

Part III: "Word Studies", which takes over half of the book, looks at over 100 individual words used by Tolkien, arranged alphabetically. Hobbit is given ten pages, but halfling also appears. Farthing, mathom and smial are also hobbit-related (the latter being philologically grouped with Smeagol and Smaug); Arkenstone and dwimmerlaik less so. From writing beyond Tolkien's legendarium come blunderbuss and corrigan. The origins of such words are considered, and the sources in which Tolkien may have read them; the use he makes of them and changes he makes to their meanings are shown.

A brief epilogue considers the ways in which Tolkien's use of words has influenced other writers, and has been recorded in the OED.

== Reception ==
The poet and art critic Kelly Grovier wrote that this book covers "neglected years in the growth of the writer's imagination", and called the first two parts "incisive essays" that illuminate the philology in Tolkien's writings. However, he suggested that the final section will appeal most to lovers of words and dictionaries. He noted that, as with hobbit, almost none of the words are invented by Tolkien (even when he thought he had), but are re-uses or developments of existing words.

The Tolkien biographer John Garth enjoyed the "vivid impression of life in the front line of words". The book "successfully reunites the academic and creative aspects of Tolkien" and also gives evidence of his influence on those who went on to work on the OED in their own turn. Garth was however disappointed at the lack of an in-depth explanation of comparative philology as practised at the OED.

The critic Imogen Carter, in contrast, though finding the archive material fascinating, thought that the "emphasis on complex lexicographical detail" makes it less appealing except to academics and the keenest fans.

== Sources ==
- Gilliver, Peter; Marshall, Jeremy; Weiner, Edmund (2006). The Ring of Words: Tolkien and the Oxford English Dictionary. Oxford: Oxford University Press. ISBN 0-19-861069-6.
- Carpenter, Humphrey (1977). J. R. R. Tolkien: A Biography. London: G. Allen & Unwin. ISBN 0-049-28037-6.
- Carter, Imogen (19 September 2009). "The Ring of Words by Peter Gilliver, Jeremy Marshall and Edmund Weiner: Book review". The Guardian.
- Garth, John (23 June 2006). "The Ring of Words: Tolkien and the Oxford English Dictionary - reviewed by John Garth". www.johngarth.co.uk.
- Gilliver, Peter (15 October 1996). "At the Wordface: J. R. R. Tolkien's Work on the Oxford English Dictionary". Mythlore. 21 (2): 173–186.
- Grovier, Kelly (7 May 2006). "Observer review: The Ring of Words edited by Peter Gilliver, Jeremy Marshall and Edmund Weiner". The Guardian.
- Tolkien, J. R. R. (1995). Carpenter, Humphrey; Tolkien, Christopher (eds.). The letters of J. R. R. Tolkien: A Selection. London: HarperCollins. ISBN 0-261-10265-6.
