= Brooke Priory =

Former house of Augustinian monks in Brooke, Rutland

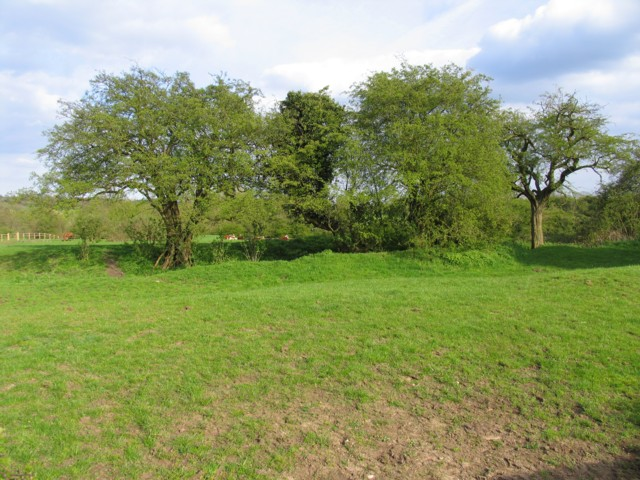
- Ancient earthworks on the site of Brooke Priory

- Location within Rutland
- Interactive map of Brooke Priory

Monastery information
- Order: Augustinian
- Established: Before 1153
- Disestablished: 1535
- Mother house: Kenilworth Abbey
- Dedication: Virgin Mary
- Diocese: Diocese of Lincoln

People
- Founder: Hugh de Ferrers

Site
- Location: Rutland, England
- Coordinates: 52.646066°N 0.752515°W

Brooke Priory was a minor house of Augustinian monks in Brooke, Rutland. It was a cell of St Mary's Abbey, Kenilworth.

== History ==
It was founded by Hugh de Ferrers (lord of the manor of Oakham) before 1153. It was dedicated to St Mary the Virgin,. The house was built close to the River Gwash which gave the parish its name.

It was only a small priory, and only intended to support three canons. The priory struggled financially, and had a rapid succession of priors who felt unable to deal with the priory's poverty. Many saw being sent to Brooke as something of a punishment. In 1298 the Bishop of Lincoln wrote to the Prior of Kenilworth urging him to take action about Brooke. The priory had become "so dilapidated and decayed that it was a scandal to the neighbourhood, and the revenues were so mismanaged that if something was not done soon the canons and their servants would have to beg their bread".

The final prior, Roger Harwell, was in a dispute with his superiors at Kenilworth. He tried to get himself a large pension for his retirement but the Abbot of Kenilworth felt unable to provide it. When, in 1535, King Henry VIII began his Dissolution of the Monasteries, Prior Harwell lied to the royal commissioners and told them Brooke Priory was independent. He then surrendered the priory for dissolution of his own accord, securing himself in the process an annual pension of £10. At dissolution the priory was described as "for the most ruinous", and is recorded as having a small annual income of £46 18s. 9½d.

Prior Harwell's actions caused problems for the Abbot of Kenilworth who, on receipt of a 1,000 mark bond, had promised to lease Brooke to a friend of Thomas Cromwell. The abbot wrote to Cromwell, begging him to either return Brooke or release him from the bond. Brooke was never returned, and the following year (September 1536), it was granted to Anthony Cope.

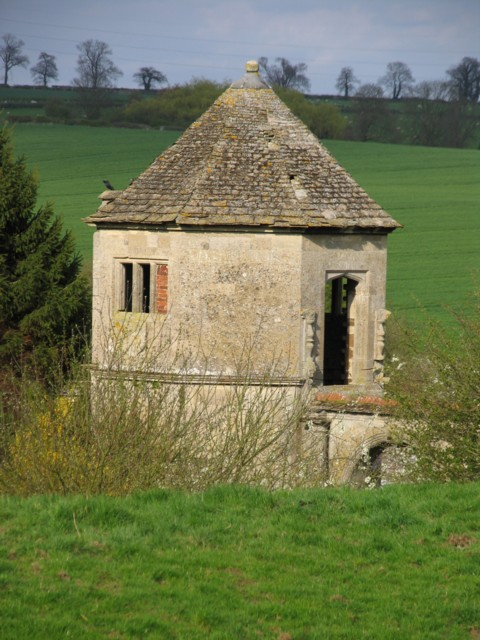
Octagon lodge of Brooke House, now a dovecote

After the dissolution the name Brooke survived as a parish name. The priory's land was sold in 1549 to Andrew Noel who built Brooke House, of which only the dovecote and octagon lodge now survives. From a Derby merchant family, Noel used this estate to climb to power. Within 5 years he was sitting in Parliament. His son, Andrew Noel, was the father of Edward Noel, who married Julianna Hicks, an heiress. The family went on to become Earls of Gainsborough.

No trace of the buildings survive, but there are earthworks and crop marks associated with fishpools or outbuildings. Some of these may date from the English Civil War or the formal gardens of the succeeding Brooke House, itself now gone. Some fragments of the original buildings are thought to have been used in the present sixteenth century house, called "Brooke Priory".

== Brooke Reliquary ==
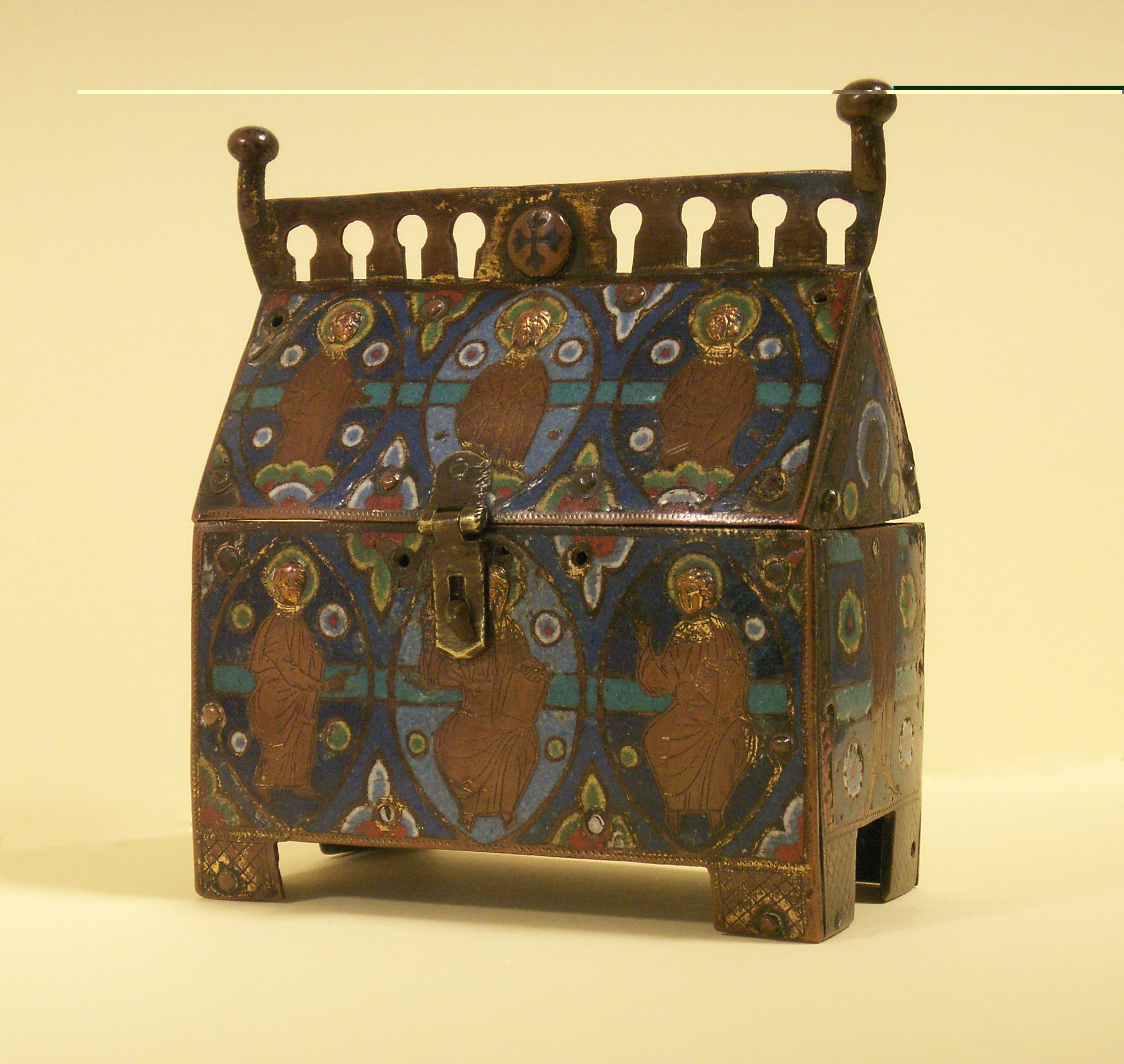
Brooke Reliquary front & right, in Limoges enamel

The Brooke Reliquary is a small casket that dates from the 13th Century. It originates from the workshops in Limoges, France and is believed to have held a saint's relics. The reliquary was discovered in c.1805, after years of being concealed on the site of Brooke Priory, when building work was carried out in the cellar of Priory House. The reliquary is decorated with Limoges enamel work in shades of blue, red, yellow and green with images of Christ with two apostles or saints. The robes on the saints are engraved on copper plates which were originally gilded, but this has worn away. It is now on display in Rutland County Museum in Oakham.

== Priors of Brooke ==
- Ralf, occurs 1180
- Richard of Lichfield, presented 1230, died 1243
- John of Wotton, presented 1243
- Robert of Ledbury, presented 1251, resigned 1285
- Nicholas of Breedon, presented 1285, resigned 1294
- Richard de Bremesgrave, presented 1294, resigned 1299
- Richard of Ketton, presented 1299, resigned 1300
- John de Flore, presented 1300, resigned 1302
- Stephen of Ketton, presented 1302
- Richard of Ketton, presented 1305
- Robert of Pershore, presented 1310
- Henry Waleys, presented 1346
- Richard of Oxenden, presented 1362, resigned 1366
- Ralf of Towcester, presented 1366, resigned 1375
- Thomas de Farncote, presented 1375
- Robert of Leicester, presented 1379, resigned 1385
- Thomas Kidderminster, presented 1385, resigned 1388
- James of Coleshill, presented 1388
- Thomas Campden, presented 1400
- Richard Charlton, presented 1400, died 1403
- John Wyche, presented 1403, resigned 1407
- John Streche, presented 1407, resigned 1425
- William Shrewsbury, presented 1425
- Thomas Blakewell, resigned 1433
- Thomas Layton, presented 1433, died 1453
- Thomas Brayles, presented 1453, resigned 1459
- Richard Marston, presented 1459, died 1487
- William Unwyn, presented 1487, resigned 1519
- John Penketh, presented 1519, resigned 1525
- Richard Rogers, presented 1525, resigned 1531
- Robert Orwell, presented 1531, died 1534
- Roger Harwell, last prior, presented 1534

The brevity of most of these appointments may be explained by remarks of John Streetche (one of the longer lasting), who wrote that being sent to the small impoverished house was something of a punishment.
