= William Cornwallis (died 1614) =

English essayist and politician

Sir William Cornwallis (c. 1576 – 1 July 1614) was an early English essayist and served as a courtier and member of Parliament. His essays, influenced by the style of Montaigne, rather than that of Francis Bacon, became a model for later English essayists. He has sometimes been confused with his uncle of the same name.

== Life ==
Cornwallis was born in Beeston St Andrew, Norfolk, and baptised in Fincham, Norfolk, the eldest child of the diplomat Sir Charles Cornwallis by his first wife Elizabeth Farnham (1552–1584), the daughter of Thomas Farnham, whose family resided in Fincham for 500 years. Cornwallis was the member of Parliament for Orford in 1604 and 1614. He was knighted in 1599 after serving in the Earl of Essex's Irish campaign. When James I assumed the throne in 1603, Cornwallis became a member of the privy chamber.

On 26 August 1595, Cornwallis married Katherine Parker. Their eleven children were Charles, Thomas (married Penelope Wiseman (1633–1696)), Henry, William, John, Phillip (d. 1688, rector of Burnham Thorpe, Norfolk), Frances (1602–1675; married Thomas Paston and was buried at Burnham Thorpe), Katherine, Bridget, Anne, Jeane. He spent freely and accumulated debts paid by selling family estates. After 1605, he spent most of his life in studious retirement. He died in 1614 leaving his wife and eight surviving children destitute. He was buried in St Martin-in-the-Fields, London. Katherine died on 30 January 1636 and was buried at Erwarton.

Cornwallis is often confused with Sir William Cornwallis of Brome, his uncle of the same name. His uncle, rather than he, was a friend of Ben Jonson. This William Cornwallis is sometimes described as "the younger" to differentiate him from his uncle, who is often described as "the elder".

== Works ==
Cornwallis's essays, meditative in tone, cover such topics as ambition, resolution, youth, essays and books, and humility. Like Montaigne's essays, they focus on self-analysis and self-improvement. His is the earliest surviving essay attempting a defence of Richard III. His essays were popular during his lifetime and retained popularity until the mid-17th century. His works, some of the earliest English examples of the essay genre, were written in the tradition of Montaigne, rather than that of Francis Bacon; they became a model for later English essayists.

His major works include:

- Essayes by Sir W. Cornewaleys (E. Mattes), 1st part 1600, 2nd part 1601, dedicated to three Harington sisters; Lady Sara Hastings, Lady Theodosia Dudley, Lady Mary Wingfield, and their friend, Lady Mary Dyer (d. 1601), wife of Sir Richard Dyer of Great Staughton. A new combined "enlarged" edition in 1610 contained a few new essays; a new edition was published in 1632.
- Discourses upon Seneca the Tragedian, 1601, the first book in English on the drama of Seneca the Younger.
- The Miraculous and Happy Union between England and Scotland, 1604.
- Essayes, or Rather, Encomions, 1616.
- Essayes of Certaine Paradoxes, 1616; one of these essays, The Encomium of Richard III received a new critical edition (Arthur Kincaid, ed.) in 1977 by Turner & Devereux (London). The earliest extant manuscript of this work, which may date from the late 16th century, was dedicated to Cornwallis's "worthey frende Mr John Donne".

He also published some verse, including a verse epistle to his friend John Donne.

== Sources ==
- Blyth, William. Historical Notices and Records of the Village and Parish of Fincham, in the County of Norfolk, King’s Lynn, Thew & Son, 1863
- Cornwallis, Sir William. Discourses upon Seneca the Tragedian, London, 1601. Facsimile ed., introd. by Robert Hood Brown, 1952, Scholars' Facsimiles & Reprints ISBN 9780820112206.
- Fakundiny, Lydia. "Cornwallis, Sir William, the Younger", Encyclopaedia of the Essay, (ed.) Chevalier, Tracy. London: Routledge, 2012 ISBN 1135314101
