= Rick Dyer =

Rick Dyer may refer to:

- Rick Dyer (video game designer), American video game designer and writer
- Rick Dyer (hoaxer), American Bigfoot enthusiast

== See also ==
- Richard Dyer (disambiguation)
