= Francis Hastings, Lord Hastings =

English nobleman (1560–1595)

Francis Hastings, Lord Hastings (1560 – 17 December 1595) was the son of George Hastings, 4th Earl of Huntingdon and Dorothy Port. He married Sarah Harington, daughter of Sir James Harington and Lucy Sydney. They had five children:

- Catherine, who married Philip Stanhope, 1st Earl of Chesterfield, died 28 August 1636
- Henry, who succeeded his grandfather as Earl of Huntingdon.
- Sir George Hastings
- Captain Edward Hastings, died 1617
- Theodosia Hastings, married Sir Francis Bodenham.

His widow, Sara or Sarah Harington (1565-1628), married Sir George Kingsmill, then Edward 11th Baron Zouche, and finally, Sir Thomas Edmondes. Her portrait was painted by Isaac Oliver and by Cornelius Johnson. The portraits by Johnson show her aged 63 wearing a large miniature case referring to Frederick V of the Palatinate with the Greek letter "phi". A similar miniature case was described in an inventory of a Scottish soldier.

== Britain's Real Monarch ==
In Britain's Real Monarch, the oldest son is in the alternative succession to the Plantagenet monarch

- Henry Hastings, 5th Earl of Huntingdon, 1604–1643
- Ferdinando Hastings, 6th Earl of Huntingdon, 1643–1656
- Theophilus Hastings, 7th Earl of Huntingdon, 1656–1701
- George Hastings, 8th Earl of Huntingdon, 1701–1704
- Theophilus Hastings, 9th Earl of Huntingdon, 1704—1746
- Francis Hastings, 10th Earl of Huntingdon, 1746–1789
- Elizabeth Rawdon, Countess of Moira, 1789–1808
- Francis Rawdon-Hastings, 1st Marquess of Hastings, 1808–1826
- George Rawdon-Hastings, 2nd Marquess of Hastings, 1826–1844
- Paulyn Rawdon-Hastings, 3rd Marquess of Hastings, 1844–1851
- Henry Rawdon-Hastings, 4th Marquess of Hastings, 1851–1868
- Edith Rawdon-Hastings, 10th Countess of Loudoun, 1844–1874
- Charles Rawdon-Hastings, 11th Earl of Loudoun, 1874–1920
- Edith Abney-Hastings, 12th Countess of Loudoun, 1920–1960
- Barbara Abney-Hastings, 13th Countess of Loudoun, 1960–2002
- Michael Abney-Hastings, 14th Earl of Loudoun, 2002–2012
- Simon Abney-Hastings, 15th Earl of Loudoun, 2012–

Elizabeth II is also descended from the oldest sister

- Catherine Hastings, †1636
- Henry, Lord Stanhope, 1606–1634
- Philip Stanhope, Earl of Chesterfield, 1634–1714
- Elizabeth Stanhope, 1663–1723
- Thomas Lyon, Earl of Strathmore, 1704–1753
- John Lyon, Earl of Strathmore, 1737–1776
- Thomas Bowes-Lyon, Earl of Strathmore, 1773–1846
- Thomas George Bowes-Lyon, Lord Glamis, 1801–1834
- Claude Bowes-Lyon, Earl of Strathmore, 1824–1904
- Claude Bowes-Lyon, Earl of Strathmore, 1855–1944
- Elizabeth Bowes-Lyon, 1900–2002
- Elizabeth II Windsor, Queen of Great Britain and Northern Ireland, 1926–2022
