= Church of St Denys, Colmworth =

Church in Colmworth, Bedfordshire, England

Coordinates: 52.2143°N 0.3784°W

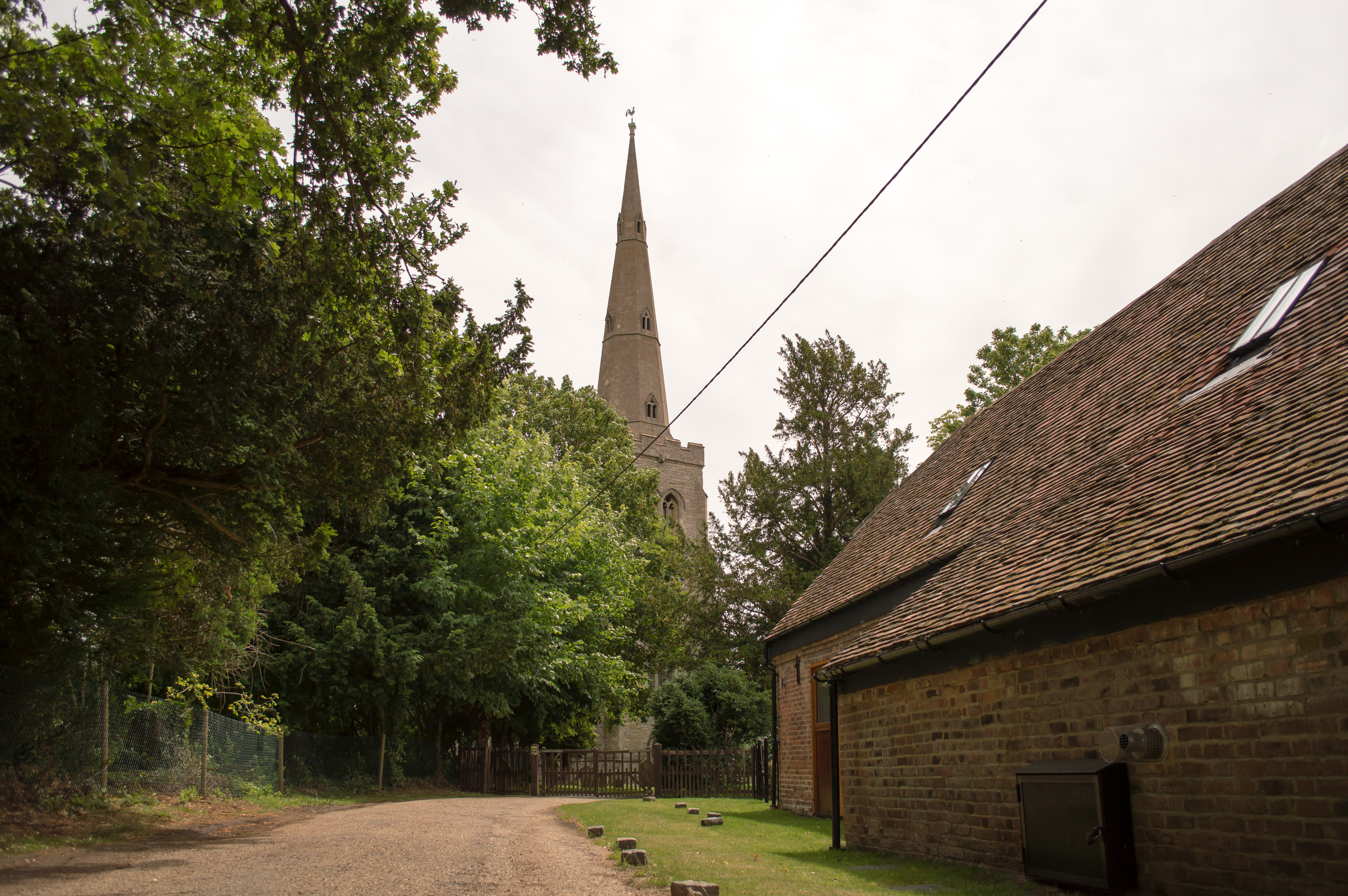

Church of St Denys is a Grade I listed church in Colmworth, Bedfordshire, England. It became a listed building on 13 July 1964.

The four stage west tower is topped by an octagonal spire with lucarnes and is supported by diagonal buttresses. There is a ring of six bells with the earliest two dated 1635. The steel frame was made in 1984.

To the left of the altar is an alabaster and black marble monument to Sir William Dyer erected in 1641 by his wife, Katherine Doyley Dyer (d. 1654). It has the following verse inscription:

If a large hart, joined with a noble minde
Shewing true worth unto all good inclin’d
If faith in friendship, justice unto all,
Leave such a memory as we may call
Happy, thine is; then pious marble keepe
His just fame waking, though his lov’d dust sleepe.
And though death can devoure all that hath breath,
And monuments them selves have had a death,
Nature shan’t suffer this, to ruinate,
Nor time demolish’t, nor an envious fate,
Rais’d by a just hand, not vain glorious pride,
Who’d be concealed, wer’t modesty to hide
Such an affection did so long survive
The object of ’t; yet lov’d it as alive.
And this greate blessing to his name doth give
To make it by his tombe, and issue live.
My dearest dust, could not thy hasty day
Afford thy drowsy patience leave to stay
One hour longer, so that we might either
Have sat up or gone to bed together?
But since thy finished labour hath possessed
Thy weary limbs with early rest,
Enjoy it sweetly, and thy widow bride
Shall soon repose her by thy slumbering side,
Whose business now is only to prepare
My nightly dress and call to prayer.
Mine eyes wax heavy, and the day grows old,
The dew falls thick, my blood grows cold,
Draw, draw the closed curtains and make room,
My dear, my dearest dust, I come, I come.

== See also ==
- Grade I listed buildings in Bedfordshire
- St Deny's Colmworth Church website*
