= Sarah Harington =

English courtier

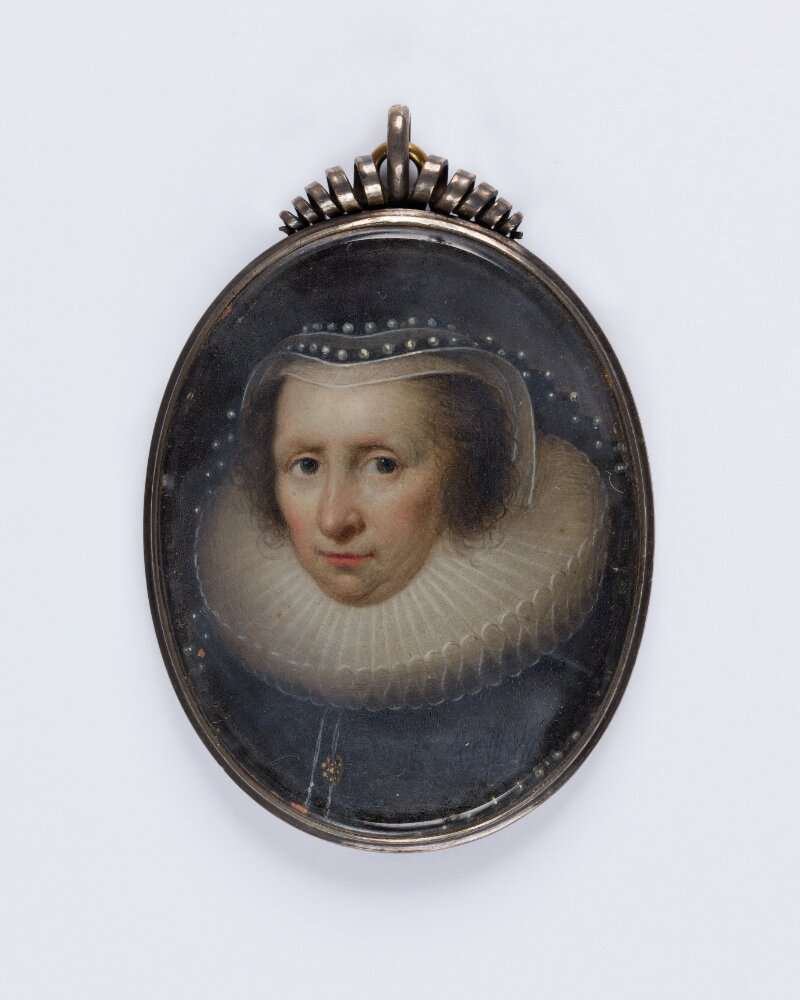
Cornelius Janssens van Ceulen - Sarah Harington, Lady Edmondo - NMB 956 - Nationalmuseum

Sarah Harington (1565–1629) was an English courtier.

Sarah or Sara Harington was a daughter of Sir James Harington of Exton and Lucy Sidney, the daughter of Sir William Sidney of Penshurst, Kent. Sarah and her sisters were literary patrons and poets and authors dedicated their works to them.

== Lady Hastings ==
She first married Francis, Lord Hastings (1560–1595). Their home was the Old Castle at Ashby-de-la-Zouch. Their children included;

- Catherine Hastings, who married Philip Stanhope, 1st Earl of Chesterfield, died 28 August 1636
- Henry Hastings, 5th Earl of Huntingdon, who succeeded his grandfather as Earl of Huntingdon.
- George Hastings (d. 1641), married Seymour Pryn daughter of Gilbert Pryn of Allington, near Chippenham, and Jane Davis.
- Edward Hastings, (d. 1617)
- Theodosia Hastings (d. 1671), who married in 1627 Francis Bodenham of Ryhall, Rutland, (d. 1645).

She was a lady-in-waiting to Elizabeth, and has been portrayed as "mercenary" in selling her influence.

On 23 February 1600 the envoy Louis Verreycken from the Spanish Netherlands had an audience with Queen Elizabeth. The great ladies of the court, dressed in white "excellently brave", including Lady Hastings, with her sisters Mabel, Lady Noel, and Theodosia, Lady Dudley (or her mother-in-law Mary, Lady Dudley), waited in the presence chamber.

In 1600 Sir William Cornwallis younger published his Essayes with a dedicatory letter by Henry Olney to three of the Harington sisters; "Lady Sara Hastings, the Lady Theodosia Dudley, the Lady Mary Wingfield", and their friend and cousin Lady Mary Dyer (d. 1601), the wife of Sir Richard Dyer of Great Staughton.

In 1603 Lady Hastings travelled to Scotland in the hope of finding favour with Anne of Denmark the wife of James VI and I. Her party met the queen before an official group sent to welcome the queen at Berwick-upon-Tweed. Hastings's party consisted of members of the Harington family, including Anne, Lady Harington and her daughter Lucy Russell, Countess of Bedford, her niece Theodosia Noel, Lady Cecil, with Elizabeth Cecil, Lady Hatton. It has been suggested that the "Lady Hastings" in the party was Dorothy Hastings, Sarah Harington's sister-in-law.

Robert Cawdrey dedicated his dictionary, the Table Alphabeticall to five daughters of Lucy Sidney, Lady Harington; Sarah, Lady Hastings, Theodosia, Lady Dudley, Elizabeth, Lady Montagu, Frances, Lady Leigh, and Mary, Lady Wingfield.

== George Kingsmill ==
Her second husband was Sir George Kingsmill of Hampshire, a Justice of the Common Pleas, (d. 1606). He left Sarah a rich widow and also provided an income for one of her daughters by Lord Hastings "who was his playfellow".

Her third husband was Edward la Zouche, 11th Baron Zouche (1556–1625). Lord Zouche's estranged wife Eleanor died in 1611. He first considered marrying Elizabeth Dent widow of Sir Francis Vere, who subsequently married Patrick Murray, 3rd Earl of Tullibardine.

== Lady Edmondes ==
Her fourth husband was the diplomat Sir Thomas Edmondes (1563–1639) who had greeted Louis Verreycken at the palace in 1600, his previous wife Magdalen Wood had died in 1614.

Sarah Harington's portrait was painted by Isaac Oliver, and by Cornelius Johnson. Two versions of the portrait by Johnson show her aged 63 in 1628 wearing a large miniature case referring to Frederick V of the Palatinate with the Greek letter "phi" depicted twice. A similar miniature case was described in an inventory of jewels belonging to a Scottish soldier.

In 1628 her sister, Mary, Lady Wingfield was the executrix of William Mason of Westminster, who left legacies to several female members of the Harington family. Mason owned portrait miniatures of Sarah, Lady Hastings, Catherine, Countess of Chesterfield, and Theodosia, Lady Dudley.

She died in 1629.
