= Sidney Montagu (MP, died 1644) =

English politician

Sir Sidney Montagu JP, KG, PC, FRS
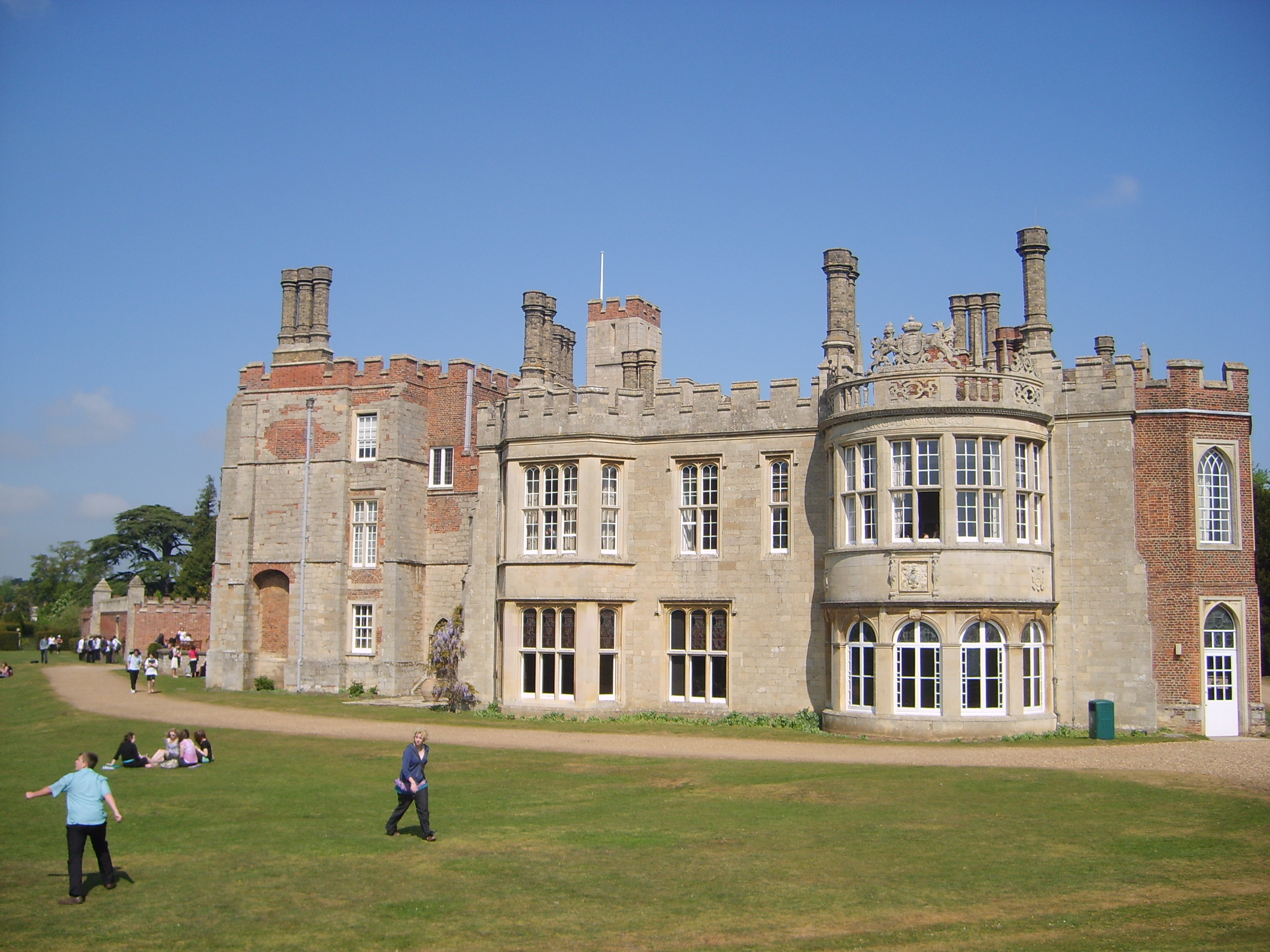
- Montagu family home, Hinchingbrooke House

Member of Parliament for Huntingdonshire
- In office November 1640 – December 1642 (suspended)

Member of Parliament for Wells
- In office April 1614 – June 1614

Member of Parliament for Malmesbury
- In office October 1601 – December 1601

Member of Parliament for Brackley
- In office February 1593 – April 1593

Personal details
- Born: c. 1572 Boughton, Northamptonshire
- Died: 25 September 1644 (aged 72) Hinchingbrooke House
- Spouse(s): (1) Paulina Pepys (1619–1638) (2) Anne Isham (1642-his death)
- Children: (1) Edward (1625–1672); Elizabeth
- Parent(s): Sir Edward Montagu; Elizabeth Harington
- Education: Christ's College, Cambridge
- Occupation: Landowner and lawyer

Sir Sidney Montagu (died 25 February 1644) was an English politician who sat in the House of Commons at various times between 1593 and 1642. He supported the Royalist cause in the First English Civil War.

Montagu was one of the younger of the eight sons of the judge Sir Edward Montagu of Boughton and Elizabeth Harington. He was the grandson of another judge Sir Edward Montagu and his third wife Helen or Eleanor Roper. He matriculated at Christ's College, Cambridge in December 1588 and was admitted at Middle Temple on 11 May 1593.

In 1593, Montagu was elected Member of Parliament for Brackley. He was elected MP for Malmesbury in 1601 and for Wells in 1614. He became Master of Requests to King Charles I and was knighted on 28 July 1616.

In November 1640, Montagu was elected MP for Huntingdonshire in the Long Parliament. Since he was reputed to be a man of great wealth, the Commons at the outset of the Civil War were infuriated by his refusal of their request to contribute £2000 to their cause. He was expelled from the Commons and committed to the Tower of London in 1642 as a known Royalist. He was released two weeks later after promising to contribute £1000 to the Parliamentary cause, although it seems that he only paid £200. He spent his remaining years in retirement.

== Family ==
Montagu lived at Hinchingbrooke House, Huntingdonshire, England. He married firstly in 1619 Paulina Pepys, daughter of John Pepys, of Cottenham, Cambridgeshire, England and sister of Richard Pepys and Thomas Pepys, grandfather of Samuel Pepys. It is often suggested that it was a love match, as Paulina had no fortune and was not her husband's social equal. Their only surviving son Edward was created Earl of Sandwich in 1660. They also had a daughter Elizabeth who married Sir Gilbert Pickering, 1st Baronet and had twelve children, including Elizabeth Creed.

Paulina died in 1638. In 1642 Sidney remarried Anne Isham, daughter of Gregory Isham of Northamptonshire, and widow of John Pay of Westminster. The marriage was very happy: in his will he praised her as a "religious, virtuous woman, as loving and contenting to me as my heart can desire", and left her generously provided for. She died in 1676.

His brothers included Edward Montagu, 1st Baron Montagu of Boughton, Sir Walter Montagu, Henry Montagu, 1st Earl of Manchester, Sir Charles Montagu and James Montagu, Bishop of Winchester.

Samuel Pepys, as he admitted, owed his start in life to the "chance without merit" which made his great-aunt Paulina the mother of the first Earl of Sandwich.

Parliament of England
Preceded by	Member of Parliament for Brackley; 1593; With: Richard Bowle	Succeeded by Richard Spencer; Randall Crew
Preceded by Sir Henry Knevett; Thomas Estcourt	Member of Parliament for Malmesbury; 1601; With: Sir William Mounson	Succeeded by Sir Roger Dalyson; Sir Thomas Dalyson
Preceded by James Kirton	Member of Parliament for Wells; 1614; With: Thomas Southworth	Succeeded by Edward Rodney; Thomas Southworth
Preceded by Thomas Cotton; Sir Capel Bedel	Member of Parliament for Huntingdonshire; 1640–1642; With: Valentine Walton	Succeeded by Valentine Walton; Edward Monagu
