= A Table Alphabeticall =

1604 English dictionary by Robert Cawdrey

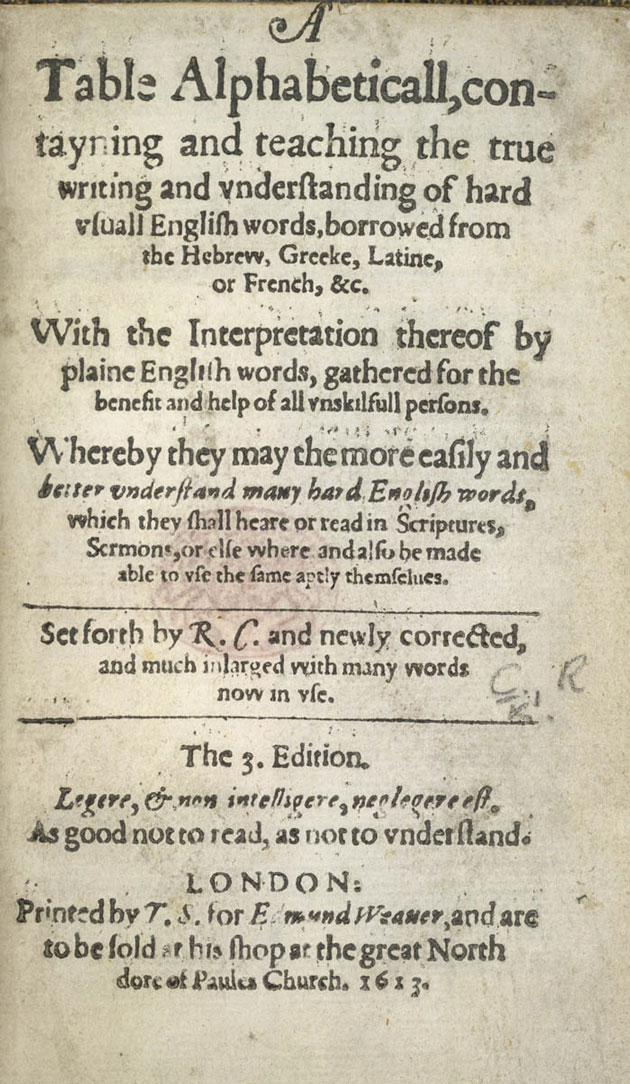
- Author: Robert Cawdrey
- Language: English
- Subject: Dictionary
- Published: 1604
- Publication place: London, Kingdom of England
- Pages: 120

A Table Alphabeticall is the first monolingual dictionary in the English language by Robert Cawdrey and first published in London in 1604.

The work is notable for being the first collection of its kind. At only 120 pages, it listed a total of 2,543 words accompanied by very brief (often single-word) definitions. In most cases, it was little more than a list of synonyms. The dictionary's claimed purpose was "for the benefit and help of unskillful persons". The words chosen by Cawdrey might seem arbitrary and obscure, yet the purpose was for understanding uncommon words which were circulating due to the advent of the printing press, and the English language Bible.

The first edition listed 2,543 headwords. The dictionary increased in size with every succeeding edition, until the fourth edition in 1617 defined 3,264 words. The only surviving copy is found at the Bodleian Library in Oxford.

The editors of the Oxford English Dictionary (OED) reference Cawdrey's Table Alphabeticall, but not by name, in the first paragraph of the Historical Introduction. "To set Cawdrey's slim small volume of 1604 beside the completed Oxford Dictionary of 1933 is like placing the original acorn beside the oak that has grown out of it."
