= James Harington (lawyer) =

English public servant

Sir James Harington of Exton (c. 1511 – 1592) was a 16th-century English public servant who fulfilled a number of legal, legislative and law enforcement duties and was knighted in 1565.

== Public career ==
James Harington's legal career began at a young age when he was called to the Inner Temple in 1536. He served as Justice of the Peace in Kesteven, Lincolnshire in 1547, and in Rutland he became sheriff in 1553 and Justice of the Peace circa 1559. He continued to fulfill the duties of sheriff in 1560-61 and, following his knighthood in June 1565, returned to those duties in 1566–67, 1578–79 and, near the end of his life, in 1586–87. Additionally, by 1569, he served as Rutland Commissioner Musters.

He was elected as a knight of the shire (MP) for Rutland in seven Parliamentary elections between 1554 and 1589.

Harington attended the funeral of Mary, Queen of Scots.

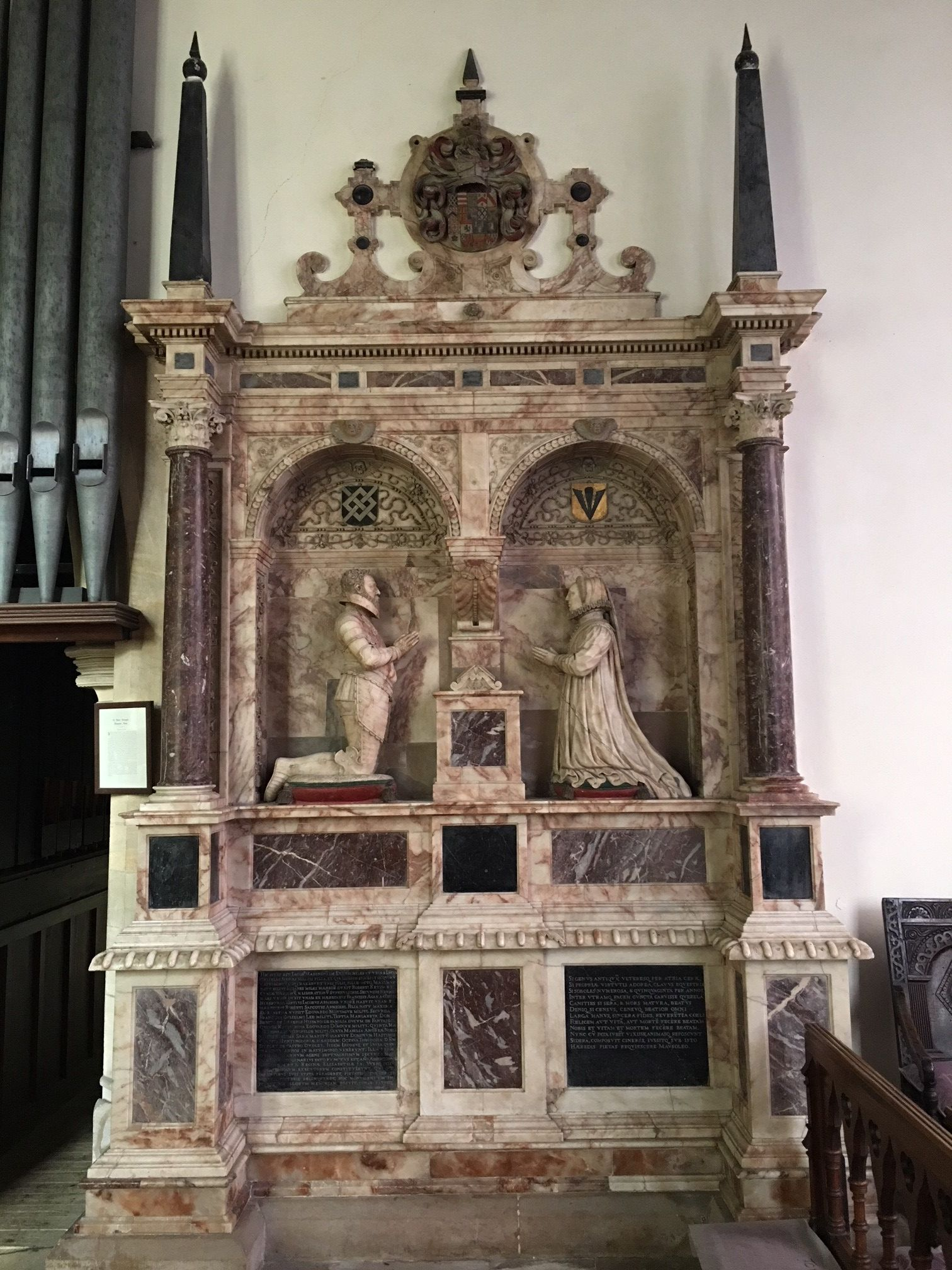
Memorial to James Harington in the Church of St Peter and St Paul, Exton, Rutland

== Parentage, marriage and descendants ==
Sir James Harington was the son of John Harington of Exton (died 1554) and Elizabeth Moton. In 1539 he married Lucy, the daughter of Sir William Sidney of Penshurst, Kent. Their children included;

- John Harington, 1st Baron Harington of Exton (1539–1613), married Anne Keilway, their children were; John Harington, 2nd Baron Harington of Exton (1592–1614), Lucy Russell, Countess of Bedford, and Frances Harington (1587-1615), wife of Sir Robert Chichester.
- Sir Henry Harington of Bagworth, and Baltinglass, Wicklow (d. 1613), married (1) Cecilia Agar, (2) Ruth Pilkington (d. 1627), daughter of James Pilkington Bishop of Durham.
- Sir James Harrington, 1st Baronet of Ridlington (1542-1614), married Frances Sapcote. Their children included Bridget Markham (1579-1609), and Anne, who married (1) Thomas Foljambe, (2) John Molyneux of Teversal
- Elizabeth Harington (d. 1618), who married Edward Montagu of Boughton
- Frances Harington, married Sir William Leigh of Newnham Regis (b. 1553), their children included Sir Francis Leigh (b. 1578).
- Margaret Harington, married Don Benito Cisneros, buried in Zafra (Spain)
- Catherine Harington, married Sir Edward Dymoke (d. 1 Aug 1624), Champion to King James (a grandson of Edward Clinton, Lord High Admiral)
- Mary Harington, married Sir Edward Wingfield of Kimbolton
- Mabel Harington, who married Sir Andrew Noel
- Sarah Harington, married (1) Francis Hastings, Baron Hastings, (2) Sir George Kingsmill, (3) Edward la Zouche, 11th Baron Zouche, (4) Sir Thomas Edmondes
- Theodosia Harington (d. 1649), married Edward Sutton, 5th Baron Dudley, their children included Mary (Dudley) Sutton, Countess of Home.
