= Richard Dyer (footballer) =

Montserratian footballer

Personal information
- Date of birth: 24 January 1968 (age 58)
- Position: Striker

International career
Years	Team	Apps	(Gls)
2000	Montserrat	1	(0)

Richard Dyer (born 24 January 1968) is a Montserratian former international footballer who played as a striker.

== Career ==
He made his international debut for Montserrat in 2000, in a FIFA World Cup qualifying match.
