= Thomas Edmondes =

English diplomat and politician

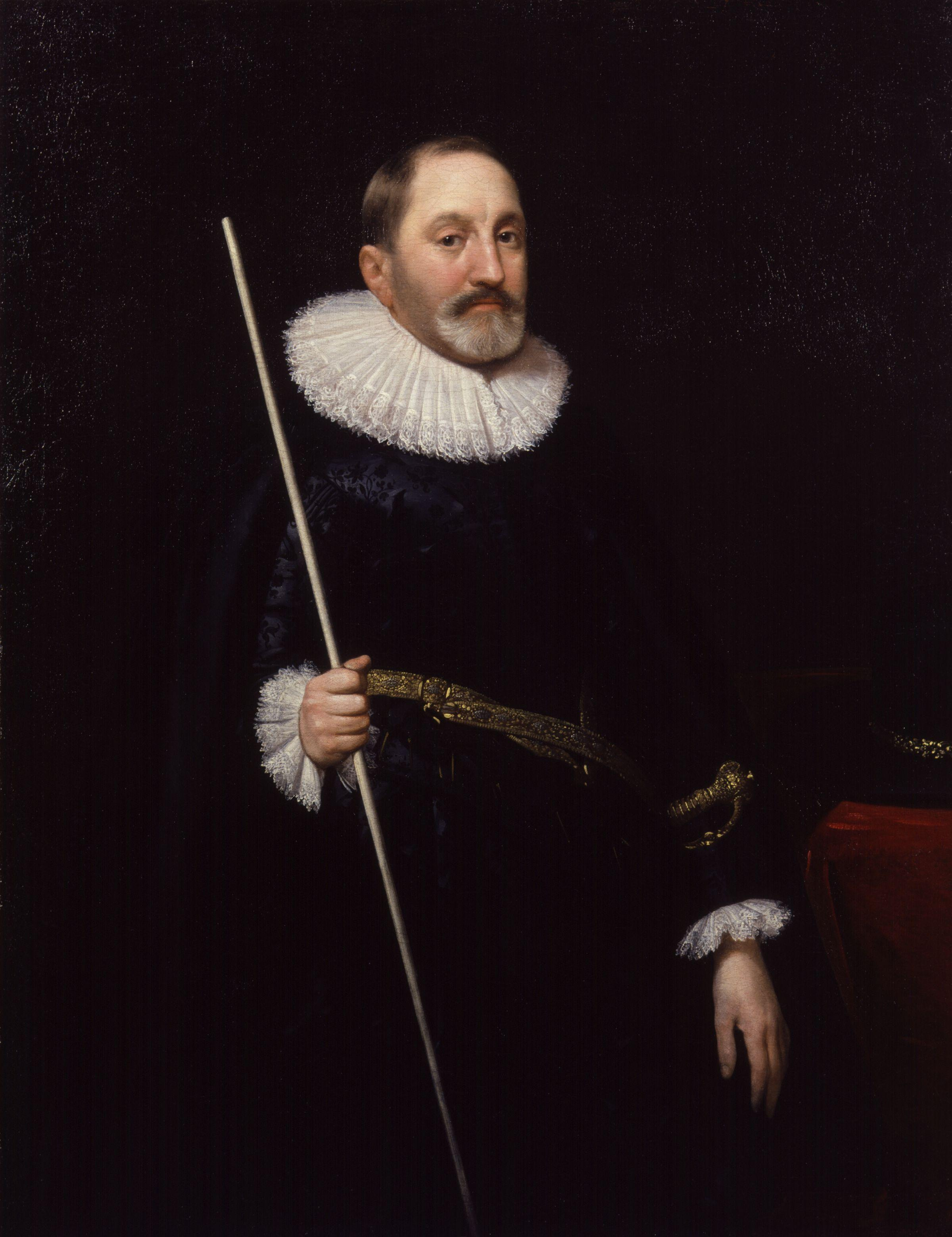
Sir Thomas Edmondes, holding a white staff, symbol of certain senior officers of the Royal Household

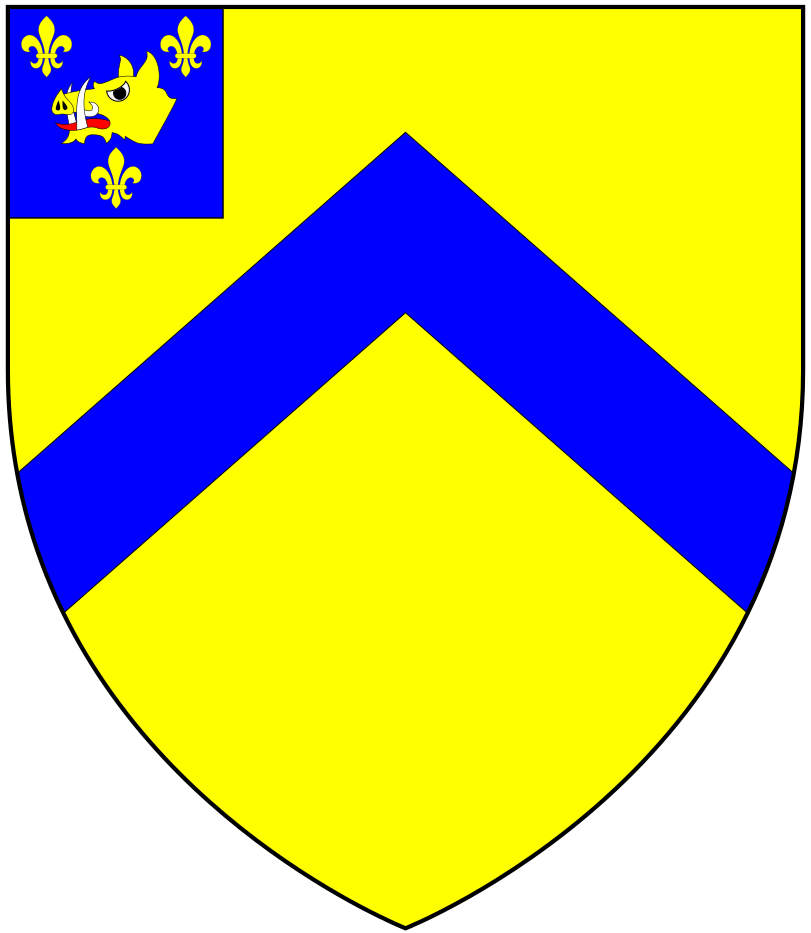
Arms of Edmonds: Or, a chevron azure on a canton of the second a boar's head couped between three fleurs-de-lys of the first

Sir Thomas Edmonds (1563 – 20 September 1639) was an English diplomat and politician who served under three successive monarchs, Queen Elizabeth I, Kings James I and Charles I, and occupied the office of Treasurer of the Royal Household from 1618 to 1639.

== Origins ==
He was the fifth son of Thomas Edmonds (d.1604) of Plymouth in Devon and of Fowey in Cornwall (eldest son of Henry Edmunds of Salisbury in Wiltshire), Customer of Plymouth in 1564, by his first wife Joane de la Bere, a daughter of Anthony De la Bere of Sherborne in Dorset.

== Career ==
He is said to have been introduced at court by another namesake, Sir Thomas Edmonds, Comptroller of the household to Queen Elizabeth I, where he received the rudiments of political education from Sir Francis Walsingham. He was a man of small stature but formidable character: people spoke of "the little man" with respect.

In 1592 the queen appointed Edmonds as her agent in France concerning the affairs of the king of Navarre and the Protestants, in which office he continued until 1596, when the queen appointed him her "secretary of the French tongue". He then returned to Paris in 1597. In 1597 he was elected as a Member of Parliament for Chippenham in Wiltshire, but as he was abroad the seat was occupied by a proxy. In 1600 he was the queen's ambassador at Brussels and one of the commissioners for the peace conference at Boulogne-sur-Mer. In 1601 he was appointed a clerk of the Privy Council, but returned to Paris as minister soon after. He was elected an MP for Liskeard, Cornwall, in 1601.

He was knighted by King James I at Greenwich Palace on 22 May 1603. In 1604 he was sent as ambassador to Rudolf II, Holy Roman Emperor. Soon after, while still abroad, he was elected a Member of Parliament for Wilton in Wiltshire and was granted the reversion to the office of Clerk of the Crown. He returned to Brussels as ambassador in 1609, and from 1610 served as ambassador to France for seven years.

In 1616 he was appointed Comptroller of the Royal Household and in 1618 Treasurer of the Royal Household, a post he held until his death. He was elected as an MP for Bewdley in 1621, for Chichester in February 1624, for Oxford University, all in the first Parliament of King Charles I in 1625 and in 1628 for Penrhyn. His final diplomatic service was to return as a special ambassador to France in 1629 to ratify a treaty.

== Retirement ==
On his return to England he retired to Albyns in Essex, a manor he had inherited from his wife, it was said he employed the architect Inigo Jones to rebuild the house. He died on 20 September 1639.

== Marriage and progeny ==
He married Magdalen Wood (died 1614), a daughter and co-heiress of Sir John Wood, Clerk of the Signet.

Their children included:

- Sir Henry Edmonds, Knight of the Bath, his heir (a "hopeless drunkard").
- Isabella Edmonds, wife of Henry West, 4th Baron De La Warr
- Frances Edmonds, wife of Robert Mildmay, and an ancestor of Baron FitzWalter.

His second wife was Sara or Sarah Harington (1565–1628), a daughter of Sir James Harington of Exton and Lucy Sidney, and widow of Francis, Lord Hastings, Sir George Kingsmith, and Edward 11th Baron Zouche. Her portrait was painted by Isaac Oliver and by Cornelius Johnson. The portraits by Johnson show her aged 63 wearing a large miniature case referring to Frederick V of the Palatinate with the Greek letter "phi". A similar miniature case was described in an inventory of a Scottish soldier.
