= St Peter's Church, Brooke, Rutland =

Church in Brooke, Rutland, England

Coordinates: 52°38′33″N 0°44′44″W

St Peter's Church
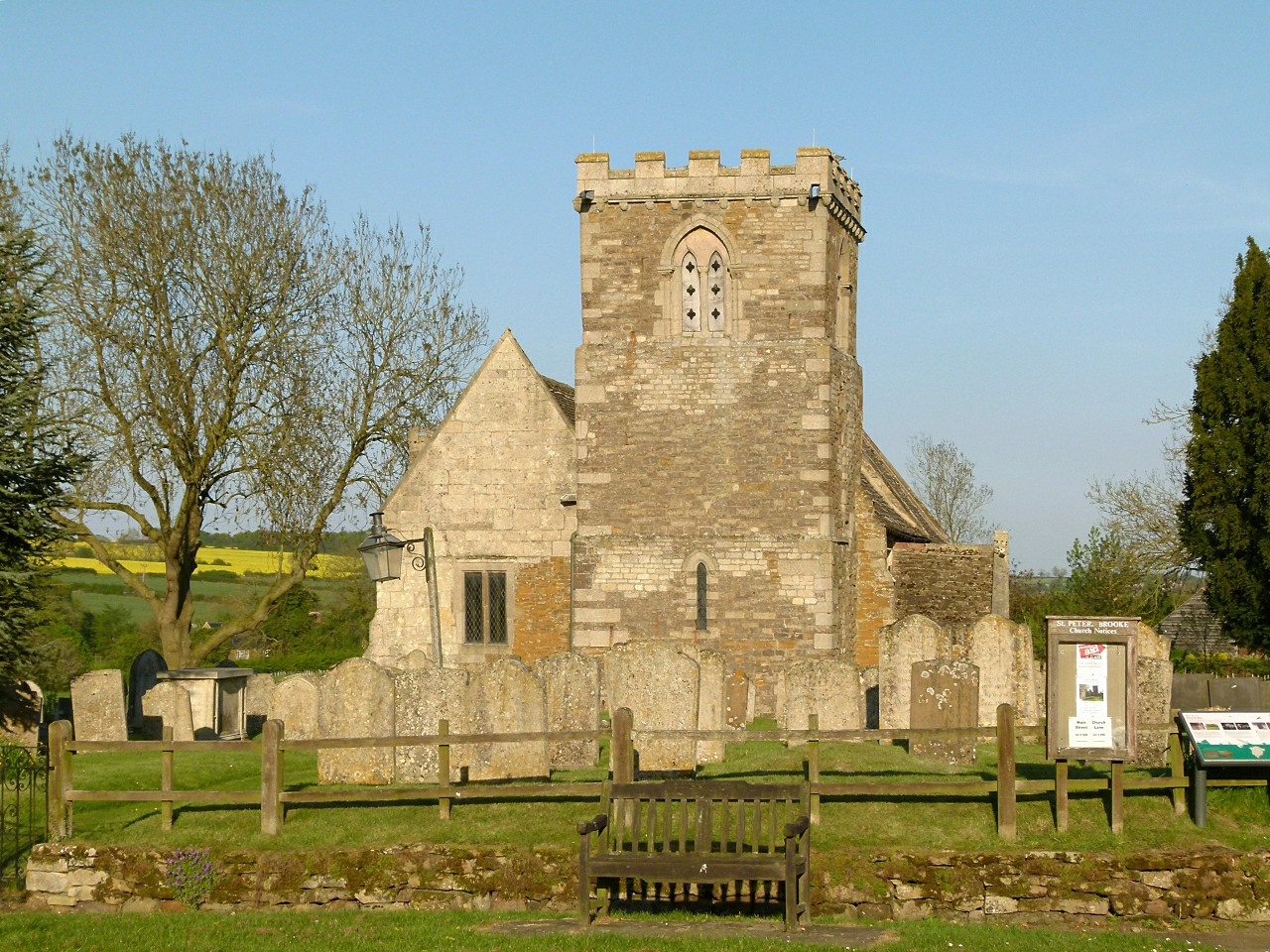
- Denomination: Church of England

History
- Dedication: St Peter

Administration
- Diocese: Peterborough
- Archdeaconry: Oakham
- Parish: Brooke, Rutland

Clergy
- Vicar(s): Stephen Griffiths

St Peter's Church is a Church of England parish church in Brooke, Rutland. It is a Grade I listed building.

== History ==
The church has a carved doorway which rises to a pointed arch, which wasn't introduced to England until after the church was built. It probably dates from the Norman era due to the Norman carving on the moulding. Also dating from this period is the font and the nave arcade. The tower, dating from the 13th century, has wider top stages than the bottom stages, an unusual feature in churches.

The inside of the church has Elizabethan features as well as Norman. The Elizabethan furnishings remain unaltered. As a result, the church was included in John Betjeman's Top 100 Churches in England. There are panelled screens and box pews and more oak furnishings. These date from the 16th century.

The nave is separated by a 16th-century wooden screen from the tower. Situated on the northern wall of the tower is a carved face which was probably used as a candle holder.

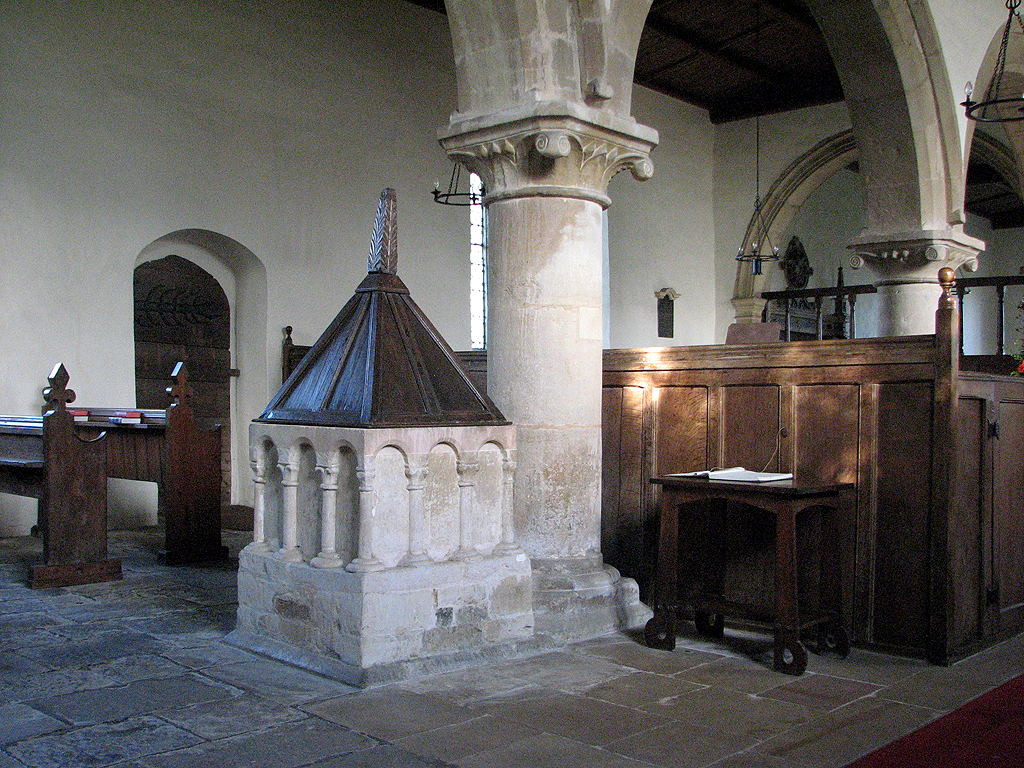
Interior of St Peter's Church, looking north-east

The church has a tomb to Charles Noel who was the son of Brooke House builder, Sir Andrew Noel. Most of the Noel family's tombs can be found in Exton where they later moved.

An unusual feature of the church is that the northern door is hung on fishbone-shaped iron hinges.

There is a stone bench near the base of the northern and western sides of the northern aisle. It was used by elderly and sick worshippers.

The chancel floor is home to many grave slabs. These include a gravestone to Endymion Cannynge who was a captain of horse to King Charles I. There is also a memorial to Henry Rawlings with four of his five wives.

There is a 1611 Judas Bible in a glass display case on the wall.

The church appeared in the 2005 film adaptation of Pride and Prejudice.
