= Francis Bodenham =

English politician

Sir Francis Bodenham

Member of Parliament for Rutland
- In office 1626–1626

Personal details
- Born: c. 1582
- Died: 1645
- Spouses: Penelope Wingfield (d. 1625); Theodosia Hastings
- Parent: Sir William Bodenham
- Education: Sidney Sussex College, Cambridge
- Occupation: Politician

Sir Francis Bodenham (c. 1582 – 1645) was an English politician who sat in the House of Commons in 1626.

Bodenham was the son of Sir William Bodenham, of Ryhall, Rutland. He matriculated at Sidney Sussex College, Cambridge in April 1601. He was admitted at Gray's Inn on 4 February 1603. In 1615, he was Sheriff of Rutland. He was knighted in 1616. In 1626, he was elected Member of Parliament for Rutland.

He married, firstly, Penelope Wingfield (d. 1625), a daughter of Sir Edward Wingfield (d. 1603) of Kimbolton Castle and Mary Harington. He married, secondly, Theodosia Hastings, daughter of Francis Hastings, Lord Hastings and Sarah Harington.

Parliament of England
Preceded by Sir William Bulstrode; Sir Guy Palmes	Member of Parliament for Rutland; 1626; With: Sir William Bulstrode	Succeeded by Sir Guy Palmes; Sir William Bulstrode
