= Andrew Noel =

English Member of Parliament

Andrew Noel or Nowell (died 1607) was an English landowner and Member of Parliament.

== Career ==
He was a second son of Andrew Noel of Dalby and Brooke and Elizabeth Hopton.

His father left his estates to the younger Andrew, rather than his eldest son, John Noel.

Noel was Member of Parliament for Rutland. He was Sheriff of Rutland in 1600.

Andrew Noel and his wife attended the funeral of Mary, Queen of Scots at Peterborough Cathedral in 1587. He carried the banner of Scotland.

His brother Henry Noel was a poet, a patron of John Dowland, and said to be a gentleman pensioner to the queen. He died on 28 February 1597 after playing a ball game called baloune at court with an Italian opponent.

He was involved in litigation with his brother-in-law John Harington of Exton (died 1613).

He died in 1603.

== Marriages and children ==
Noel married Mabel Harington (died 1603), a daughter of James Harington of Exton and Lucy Sidney. Their children included:

- Edward Noel (1582–1643), who married in 1605 Julianna Hickes (c. 1580–1680), daughter of Sir Baptist Hicks, the disappearance of her steward William Harrison was known as the Campden Wonder, another steward, Endymion Canning, was buried at Brooke. Edward Noel became the 2nd Viscount Campden. He sold the manor of Dalby to Mary Villiers, Countess of Buckingham in 1617.
- Charles Noel (1591–1619), who was commemorated by a monument in St Peter's Church, Brooke, Rutland.
- Arthur Noel
- Alexander Noel of Whitwell, married Mary Palmer daughter of Sir Thomas Palmer of Charlton.
- Lucy Noel, who married in 1601 the recusant William Eure, 4th Baron Eure of Ingleby and Malton (1579-1646).
- Elizabeth Noel, who married (1) George Tuchet, 1st Earl of Castlehaven, (2) Sir Piers Crosby.
- Theodosia Noel (1578–1616), who married Edward Cecil, 1st Viscount Wimbledon. She was buried at the cathedral of Utrecht.
