= Brooke, Rutland =

Village and civil parish in Rutland, England

Coordinates: 52.64°N 0.75°W

Brooke
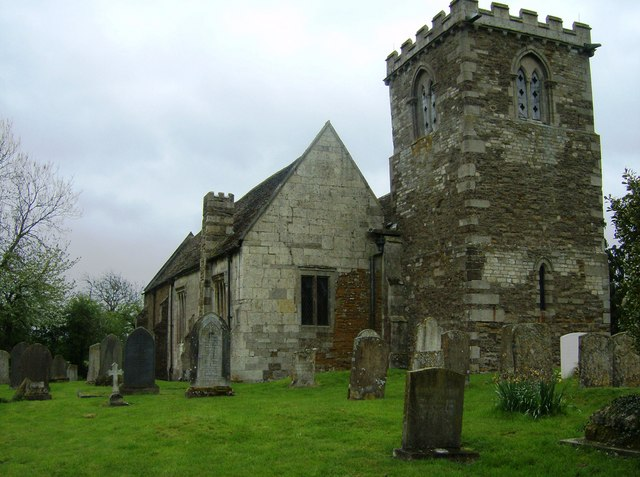
- St Peter's Church

- Location within Rutland
- Area: 2.25 sq mi (5.8 km^{2})
- Population: 211 2001 Census
  - Density: 94/sq mi (36/km^{2})
- OS grid reference: SK848057
  - London: 83 miles (134 km) SSE
- Unitary authority: Rutland
- Shire county: Rutland
- Ceremonial county: Rutland
- Region: East Midlands
- Country: England
- Sovereign state: United Kingdom
- Post town: OAKHAM
- Postcode district: LE15
- Dialling code: 01572
- Police: Leicestershire
- Fire: Leicestershire
- Ambulance: East Midlands
- UK Parliament: Rutland and Stamford

Brooke is a village and civil parish in the county of Rutland in the East Midlands of England. It is situated about three miles (4.8 km) southwest of Oakham. The village is near the source of the River Gwash near Braunston-in-Rutland; the river forms part of the parish boundary. From the 2011 census the population is included in the civil parish of Braunston-in-Rutland.

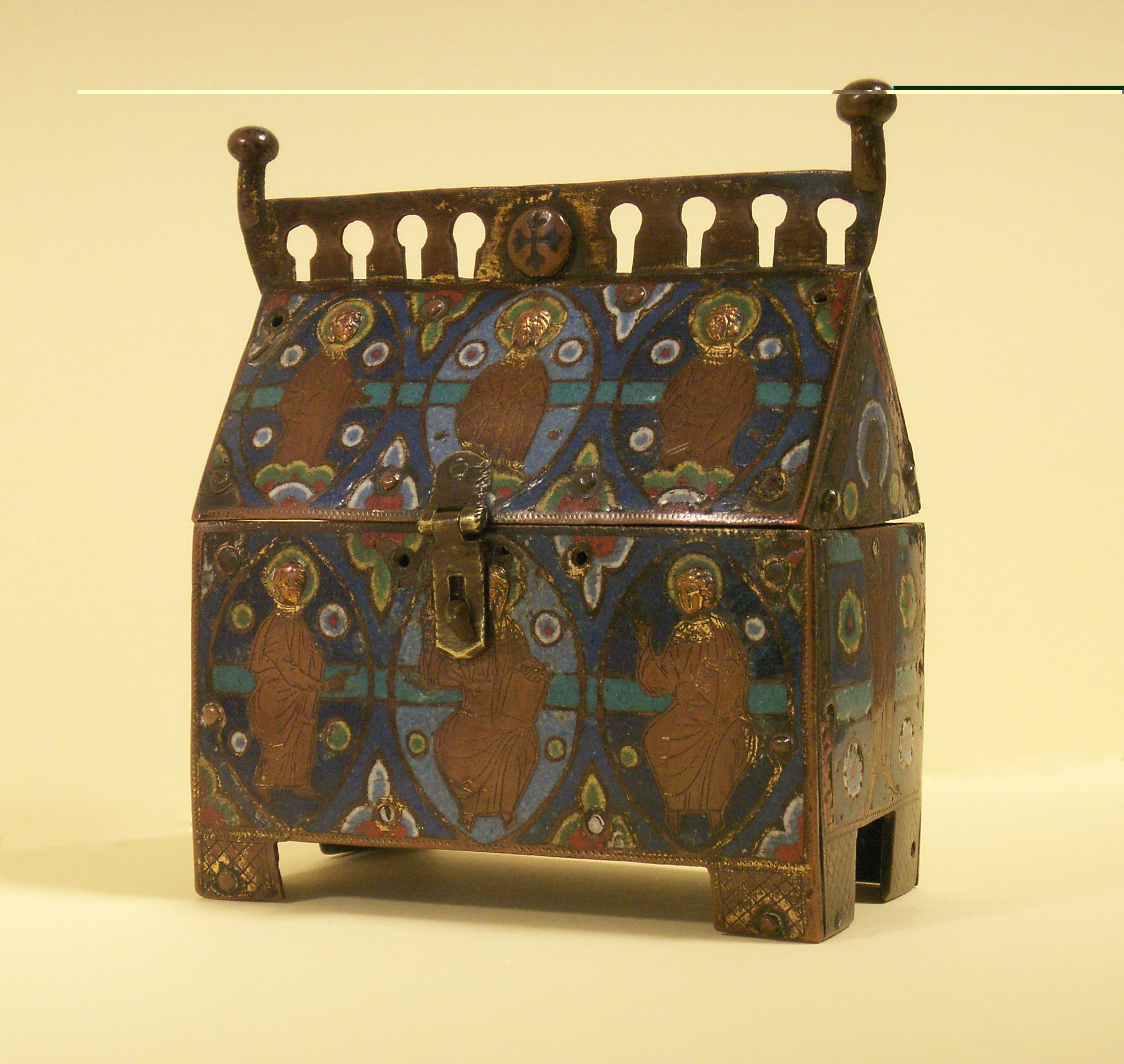
Brooke Reliquary front & right, in Limoges enamel

The parish church is dedicated to St Peter. The church appeared in the 2005 film adaptation of Pride & Prejudice.

The small Brooke Priory was founded for Austin Canons, as a cell of St Mary's Abbey, Kenilworth, apparently during the third quarter of the 12th century.

No trace of the buildings survive, but there are earthworks and crop marks associated with fishpools or outbuildings. Some of these may date from the English Civil War or the formal gardens of the succeeding Brooke House, itself now gone. Some fragments of the original buildings are thought to have been used in the present 16th century house, called Brooke Priory.

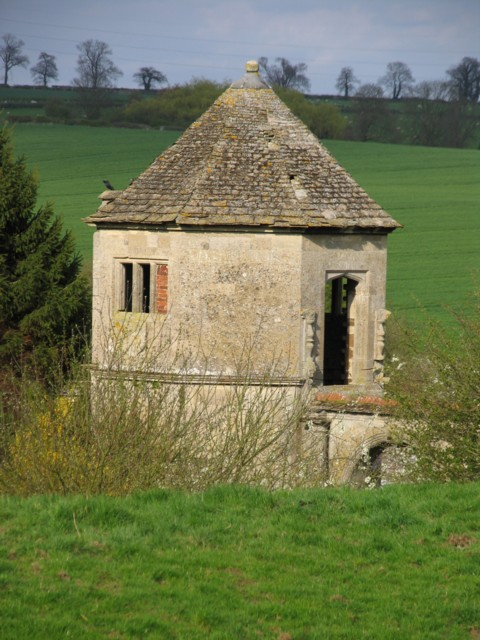
Octagon lodge of Brooke House, now a dovecote

The land was sold in 1549 to Andrew Noel who built Brooke House, of which only the dovecote and octagon lodge now survives. James VI and I stayed at Brooke in August 1612 as a guest of Edward Noel.

Brooke Priory School was founded here in 1989 but moved to Oakham in 1996.

The Brooke Reliquary was discovered in c.1805 in the cellar of Priory House. This small enamelled casket dates from the 13th Century and originates from workshops in Limoges, France. It is now on display at Rutland County Museum.
