= John Simpson (lexicographer) =

English lexicographer

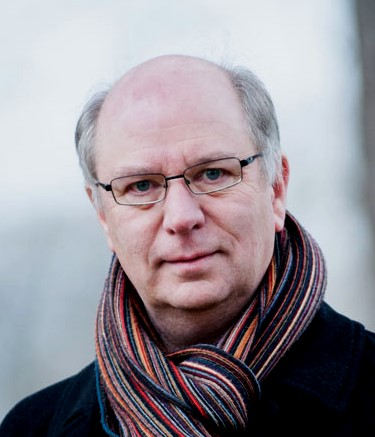
- Born: 13 October 1953 (age 72); Cheltenham, Gloucestershire, England
- Education: University of York; University of Reading
- Occupations: Lexicographer; Chief Editor, OED
- Website: www.johnsimpson.org

John Simpson OBE (born 13 October 1953) is an English lexicographer and was Chief Editor of the Oxford English Dictionary (OED) from 1993 to 2013.

== Life ==
John Simpson was born in Cheltenham, where his father was employed at GCHQ, and attended Dean Close School. He gained a BA in English Literature at the University of York in 1975 and an MA in Medieval Studies at the University of Reading in 1976.

He is married with two daughters, and now lives in Cricklade, Wiltshire.

== Career ==
Simpson joined the editorial staff of the OED in 1976 to work on the Supplement to the OED. He was Co-Editor of the Second Edition of the OED, published in 1989, and in 1993 was appointed Chief Editor, a position he held until his retirement in October 2013. As Chief Editor, he led the first comprehensive revision of the OED and oversaw the introduction of its online version.

Simpson is a member of the English Faculty at the University of Oxford, an Emeritus Fellow of Kellogg College, Oxford, and a member of the Philological Society, where the idea of the Dictionary was first proposed in the 1850s. He was a founder member of the European Federation of National Institutions for Language and has acted as an adviser to a number of other national dictionaries, including the Opera del Vocabolario Italiano and the Australian National Dictionary.

He has been awarded two D.Litt degrees, the first in 1999 by the Australian National University for his "distinguished creative achievement as a scholar in lexicography", and the second in 2015 by the University of Leicester for his work on the OED. He was appointed Officer of the Order of the British Empire (OBE) in the 2014 Birthday Honours for services to literature.

== Publications ==
Simpson edited the Concise Oxford Dictionary of Proverbs (1982) and co-edited the Oxford Dictionary of Modern Slang (1992). He wrote introductions to Robert Cawdrey's Table Alphabeticall (1604), B.E.'s Dictionary of the Canting Crew (1699), Francis Grose's Popular Superstitions (1787), and James Redding Ware's Victorian Dictionary of Slang and Phrase (1909), published by the Bodleian Library. He co-edits (with Harald Beck) James Joyce Online Notes, a forum for the publication of documentary evidence about the people, words and cultural references in James Joyce's fiction.

His memoir The Word Detective, which tells the story of his time at the Oxford English Dictionary, was published in October 2016 by Little, Brown and in 2017 in paperback by Abacus Books.

His most recent publication – Managing Poverty: Cheltenham Settlement Examinations and Removal Orders, 1831–52, Gloucestershire Records Series 34, 2020 (ISBN 978-0-900197-99-4) – deals with the experience of paupers in his home town of Cheltenham in the mid-nineteenth century. It won the Alan Ball Local History Award 2020.

== Relevant literature ==
- Mieder, Wolfgang. 2018. "The Word (and Phrase) Detective": A Proverbial Tribute to OED Editor John A. Simpson. Proverbium 35:223-262.
