= Great Staughton =

Village in Cambridgeshire, England

Coordinates: 52.267°N 0.333°W

- Location within Cambridgeshire
- Population: 896 (2011)
- OS grid reference: TL137645
- District: Huntingdonshire
- Shire county: Cambridgeshire
- Region: East
- Country: England
- Sovereign state: United Kingdom
- Post town: St Neots
- Postcode district: PE19
- Police: Cambridgeshire
- Fire: Cambridgeshire
- Ambulance: East of England
- UK Parliament: Huntingdon

Great Staughton is a village and civil parish in Cambridgeshire, England. Great Staughton lies approximately 8 miles (13 km) south-west of Huntingdon. Great Staughton is situated within Huntingdonshire which is a non-metropolitan district of Cambridgeshire as well as being a historic county of England.

== History ==
Archaeological studies indicate that there was a settlement on the site now occupied by Great Staughton during the Roman occupation of Britain.

Great Staughton was listed as Tocheston in the Domesday Book of 1086 in the Hundred of Toseland in Huntingdonshire. There was one manor and 21 households, with an estimated population of 73 and 105 people. There were 10.5 ploughlands, with the capacity for a further 4.5, 24 acres (10 hectares) of meadows, and 100 acres (40 hectares) of woodland. There was already a church and a priest at Great Staughton at this time.

== Government ==
As a civil parish, Great Staughton has a parish council. The parish council consists of nine councillors and meets approximately six times a year in the village hall. The second tier of local government is Huntingdonshire District Council. Great Staughton is a part of the district ward of Kimbolton and Staughton and is represented on the district council by one councillor. The highest tier of local government is Cambridgeshire County Council. Great Staughton is part of the electoral division of Brampton and Kimbolton and is represented on the county council by one councillor.

Great Staughton was in the historic and administrative county of Huntingdonshire until 1965. From 1965, the village was part of the new administrative county of Huntingdon and Peterborough. Then in 1974, following the Local Government Act 1972, Great Staughton became a part of the county of Cambridgeshire.

At Westminster Great Staughton is in the parliamentary constituency of Huntingdon, and since 2024 has been represented in the House of Commons by Conservative MP Ben Obese-Jecty.

== Demography ==
=== Population ===
In the period 1801 to 1901 the population of Great Staughton was recorded every ten years by the UK census. During this time the population was in the range of 746 (the lowest was in 1901) and 1373 (the highest was in 1871).

From 1901, a census was taken every ten years with the exception of 1941 (due to the Second World War).

| Parish | 1911 | 1921 | 1931 | 1951 | 1961 | 1971 | 1981 | 1991 | 2001 | 2011 |
|---|---|---|---|---|---|---|---|---|---|---|
| Great Staughton | 763 | 685 | 651 | 875 | 985 | 1,042 | 1,576 | 834 | 836 | 896 |

All population census figures from report Historic Census figures Cambridgeshire to 2011 by Cambridgeshire Insight.

In 2011, the parish covered an area of 5,078 acres (2,055 hectares) and so the population density for Great Staughton in 2011 was 112.9 persons per square mile (43.6 per square kilometre).

== Culture and community ==
Great Staughton has two public houses, The White Hart and The Snooty Tavern, a post office and a butcher's shop. The village also has a doctor's surgery and a primary school.

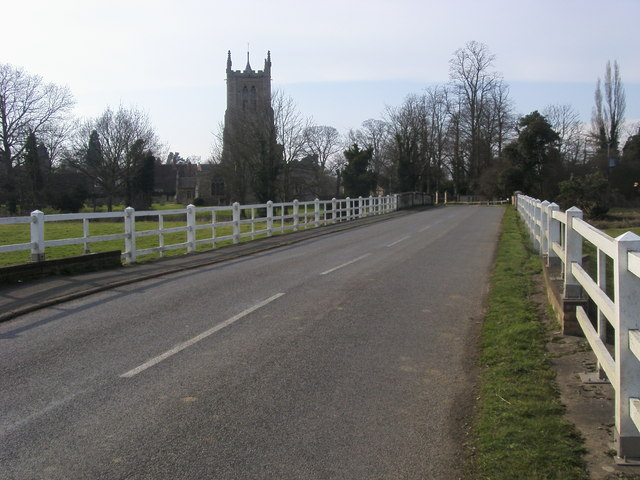
St Andrew's Church, Staughton.

== See also ==
- Little Staughton, located just over the county border in Bedfordshire
- Valentine Walton (c. 1594–1661), regicide
