= Edward Montagu of Boughton =

16th-century English politician

Sir Edward Montagu (c. 1530 – 26 January 1602) was an English landowner and politician who sat in the House of Commons in 1559.

== Career ==
Montagu was the eldest surviving son of Sir Edward Montagu of Boughton House, near Kettering and his third wife Helen Roper, daughter of John Roper of Well Hall, Eltham. In 1556, he succeeded on the death of his father to eleven manors, Barnwell Castle, the baronial residence at Boughton, and the patronage of eight livings in Northamptonshire. He extended his possessions by a grant of concealed lands in Northamptonshire, and bought the manor of Trafford and woods near Brigstock and property at Newton, Overdean and Woodhall Bedfordshire.

In 1559, Montagu was elected Member of Parliament for Northamptonshire. He was a J.P. for Northamptonshire from about 1559 and was Sheriff of Northamptonshire from 1559 to 1560. He was knighted between 1568 and 1570. In 1570 he became Deputy Lieutenant and was Sheriff of Northamptonshire again from 1570 to 1571. He was a commissioner to regulate the "export" of corn in 1572, commissioner for Peterborough cathedral lands in 1574 and commissioner for religious "disorders" for Northampton in 1579.

He attended the funeral of Mary, Queen of Scots on 1 August 1587 as treasurer. From 1588 to 1589 he was Sheriff of Northamptonshire again and in 1590 was a commissioner for recusancy in the 1590s. He served his fourth term as sheriff of Northamptonshire from 1600 to 1601.

Montagu died at the age of about 70. He was described as an "earnest furtherer" of religion and was known as "the friend of Kettering". Many of his contemporaries remarked on his piety and justice, his wisdom and service to the count.

== Marriage and children ==
Montagu married Elizabeth Harington, a daughter of James Harington of Exton, Rutland in 1557. They had eight sons and four daughters. He was father of:

- Edward Montagu, 1st Baron Montagu of Boughton, ancestor of Montagu, Dukes of Montagu.
- Henry Montague
- Sir Walter Montague
- Henry Montagu, 1st Earl of Manchester, ancestor of Montagu, Dukes of Manchester and Montagu, Earls of Halifax.
- Sir Charles Montagu
- James Montagu, Bishop of Winchester.
- Sir Sidney Montagu, ancestor of Montagu, Earls of Sandwich.
- Thomas Montague
- Lucy Montagu who married Sir William Wray, 1st Baronet, of Glentworth
- Susanna Montague
- Theodosia Montagu who married Sir John Capell; their son was Arthur Capell, 1st Baron Capell of Hadham.

Parliament of England
Preceded by Sir Walter Mildmay; Sir John Spencer	Member of Parliament for Northamptonshire; 1559; With: Sir Walter Mildmay	Succeeded by Sir Walter Mildmay; Sir William Cecil
