= Thomas Mackworth (disambiguation) =

Thomas Mackworth was an English politician.

Thomas Mackworth may also refer to:

- Sir Thomas Mackworth, 1st Baronet (died 1626), of the Mackworth baronets
- Sir Thomas Mackworth, 3rd Baronet (1624–1694), of the Mackworth baronets, MP for Rutland (UK Parliament constituency)
- Sir Thomas Mackworth, 4th Baronet (died 1745), of the Mackworth baronets, MP for Rutland
- Sir Thomas Mackworth, 5th Baronet (died 1769), of the Mackworth baronets
