= Sir Humphrey Mackworth, 7th Baronet =

Sir Humphrey Mackworth, Bt JP
- Born: Humphrey Mackworth; 11 July 1871
- Died: 25 August 1948 (aged 77)
- Education: Marlborough College; Oxford Military College
- Spouses: Margaret Haig Thomas (m. 1908; div. 1922) Dorothy Cecil Cleeves Llewellyn (m. 1923)
- Parent(s): Sir Arthur Mackworth, 6th Baronet; Alice Kate Cubitt
- Relatives: Joseph Cubitt (grandfather)

Sir Humphrey Mackworth, 7th Baronet JP (11 July 1871 – 25 August 1948) was a Welsh soldier.

== Early life ==
Mackworth was born on 11 July 1871. He was the son of Sir Arthur William Mackworth, 6th Baronet and the former Alice Kate Cubitt (1846–1915), a daughter of Joseph Cubitt. His paternal grandparents were Sir Digby Francis Mackworth, 5th Baronet and Mathilde Eleanor Eliza Peddie. His elder brother Digby died at Ladysmith during the Second Boer War.

Mackworth was educated at Marlborough College in Wiltshire then Oxford Military College in Cowley where he gained the rank of Lieutenant in the service of the 3rd Battalion, Royal West Surrey Regiment.

== Career ==
Escutcheon of the Mackworth baronets of The Gnoll

Mackworth fought in the Second Boer War and held the office of Justice of the Peace for Monmouthshire. He gained the rank of captain in 1902 in the service of the Royal Monmouthshire Royal Engineers. He gained the rank of captain between 1915 and 1919 in the service of the Remount Service.

Upon the death of his father on 8 March 1914, he succeeded to the title of 7th Mackworth Baronet of The Gnoll, Glamorgan.

== Personal life ==
On 9 July 1908, Mackworth married, firstly, Margaret Haig Thomas, the only daughter of Welsh coal magnate David Alfred Thomas, 1st Viscount Rhondda and Sybil Margaret Haig. In 1913, Margaret, a militant suffragist, was arrested "at her residence and conveyed in her own motor car to the police station at Newport, charged with setting fire to the contents of a pillar box." In 1918, Lady Mackworth, who was a dozen years his junior, inherited her father's viscountcy and became the 2nd Viscountess Rhondda. Sir Humphrey and the Viscountess were divorced in December 1922.

On 15 September 1923, Sir Humphrey married, secondly, Dorothy Cecil Cleeves Llewellyn (1892-1971), daughter of John Charles Llewellyn.

Sir Humphrey died on 2 May 1948 at age 76, without issue, and was succeeded in the baronetcy by his younger brother, Harry Llewellyn Mackworth.

Baronetage of Great Britain
Preceded by Arthur William Mackworth	Baronet (of The Gnoll); 1914–1948	Succeeded by Harry Llewellyn Mackworth
