= Sir Arthur Mackworth, 6th Baronet =

Sir Arthur Mackworth, Bt DL JP CB
- Born: Arthur William Mackworth; 5 October 1842
- Died: 8 March 1914 (aged 71)
- Spouse: Alice Kate Cubitt (m. 1865)
- Children: 12
- Parent(s): Sir Digby Mackworth, 5th Baronet; Mathilde Eleanor Eliza Peddie

Sir Arthur William Mackworth, 6th Baronet DL JP CB (5 October 1842 – 8 March 1914) was a Welsh soldier.

== Early life ==
He was the son of Sir Digby Francis Mackworth, 5th Baronet and the former Mathilde Eleanor Eliza Peddie. His paternal grandparents were Sir Digby Mackworth, 4th Baronet and the former Marie Alexandrine Ignatie Julie de Richepance (the daughter of General Baron de Antoine Richepanse). His second cousin was the poet Digby Mackworth Dolben.

Upon his father's death in 1857, fifteen year old Arthur succeeded as the 6th Baronet Mackworth, of The Gnoll, Glamorgan.

== Career ==
Escutcheon of the Mackworth baronets of The Gnoll

Sir Arthur gained the rank of Lieutenant in the Royal Engineers in 1861, Captain in 1873, Major in 1881, and Lieutenant-Colonel in 1882. He participated in the Egyptian Campaign of 1882. He was commander of the Royal Engineers, South Wales between 1883 and 1888, and gained the rank of Colonel in 1886. He was commander of the Royal Engineers, West Indies between 1888 and 1889 and served as commander of the Royal Engineers, Aldershot between 1894 and 1899.

He held the office of Justice of the Peace for Monmouthshire, Deputy Lieutenant of Monmouthshire and was made a Companion, Order of the Bath in 1897.

== Personal life ==
On 18 October 1865, Mackworth was married to Alice Kate Cubitt, daughter of Joseph Cubitt, at the British Embassy in Paris. Together, they were the parents of:

- Gwyneth Mackworth (1866–1938), who married Col. Gwynnedd Conway Gordon, son of Col. Lewis Conway Gordon, in 1894.
- Digby Mackworth (1868–1900), who was killed at Ladysmith in the Second Boer War.
- Helen Mackworth (1870–1951), who died unmarried.
- Sir Humphrey Mackworth, 7th Baronet (1871–1948), who married, firstly, Margaret Haig Thomas, the only daughter of David Alfred Thomas, 1st Viscount Rhondda and Sybil Thomas, Viscountess Rhondda. After he inherited the baronetcy and she inherited her fathers viscounty, they divorced in December 1922. Sir Humphrey married, secondly, Dorothy Cecil Cleeves Llewellyn, daughter of John Charles Llewellyn in 1923.
- Mary Josephine Mackworth (1872–1960), who died unmarried.
- Beryl Katherine Mackworth (1875–1954), who died unmarried.
- Francis Julian Audley Mackworth (1876–1914), who married Dorothy Conran Lascelles, only daughter of Arthur Hastings Lascelles, in 1910; he was killed in action during World War I.
- Sir Harry Llewellyn Mackworth, 8th Baronet (1878–1952), who married Leonie Georgette Peterson, daughter of Professor Franklin Sievewright Peterson, in 1913.
- Vice-Admiral Geoffrey Mackworth (1879–1952), who married Noel Mabel Langford, daughter of William Thomas Langford, in 1910.
- Dorothy Mackworth (1880–1943), who died unmarried.
- Lt. Arthur Christopher Paul Mackworth (1886–1917), who died unmarried.
- John Dolben Mackworth (1887–1939), who married Marianne Annette Sillem, daughter of H. W. Sillem, in 1913.

Sir Arthur died on 8 March 1914. Lady Mackworth died on 25 March 1915.

=== Descendants ===
Through his son Geoffrey, he was the grandfather of aviator Sir David Arthur Geoffrey Mackworth, 9th Baronet (1912–1998).

Baronetage of Great Britain
Preceded by Digby Francis Mackworth	Baronet (of The Gnoll); 1857–1914	Succeeded by Humphrey Mackworth
