= Viscountess Rhondda =

Viscountess Rhondda may refer to:

- Sybil Thomas, Viscountess Rhondda (1857–1941), Welsh suffragette, feminist and philanthropist
- Margaret Haig Thomas, Viscountess Rhondda (1883–1958), Welsh suffragette and feminist, daughter of the above
