= Mackworth baronets of The Gnoll (1776) =

Escutcheon of the Mackworth baronets of The Gnoll

The Mackworth baronetcy, of The Gnoll in the County of Glamorgan, was created in the Baronetage of Great Britain on 16 September 1776 for Herbert Mackworth, Member of Parliament for Cardiff for many years. His father, Herbert Mackworth, also represented this constituency in the House of Commons; while his grandfather, Humphrey Mackworth, was Member of Parliament for Cardiganshire and Totnes.

The 8th Baronet was a colonel in the Royal Corps of Signals.

== Mackworth baronets, of The Gnoll (1776) ==
- Sir Herbert Mackworth, 1st Baronet (1737–1791).
- Sir Robert Humphrey Mackworth, 2nd Baronet (1764–1795)
- Sir Digby Mackworth, 3rd Baronet (1766–1838), of Glen Usk, Monmouthshire
- Sir Digby Mackworth, 4th Baronet (1789–1852)
- Sir Digby Francis Mackworth, 5th Baronet (1817–1857)
- Sir Arthur William Mackworth, 6th Baronet (1842–1914)
- Sir Humphrey Mackworth, 7th Baronet (1871–1948)
- Sir Harry Llewellyn Mackworth, 8th Baronet (1878–1952)
- Sir David Arthur Geoffrey Mackworth, 9th Baronet (1912–1998)
- Sir Digby John Mackworth, 10th Baronet (1945–2018)
- Sir Alan Keith Mackworth, 11th Baronet (born 1945), emeritus Professor of Computer Science, University of British Columbia.

The heir presumptive is Hugh Francis Mackworth (born 1958), brother of the 11th Baronet.

== Extended family ==
- Geoffrey Mackworth (1879–1952), fifth son of the 6th Baronet, was a vice-admiral in the Royal Navy.
- Philip Herbert Mackworth (1897–1958), great-grandson of Herbert Mackworth, second son of the 3rd Baronet, was an air vice-marshal in the Royal Air Force.

== Notes ==
Baronetage of Great Britain
Preceded by Winn baronets	Mackworth baronets of The Gnoll; 16 September 1776	Succeeded by Laroche baronets
