= Mackworth baronets of Normanton (1619) =

Escutcheon of the Mackworth baronets of Normanton

The Mackworth baronetcy, of Normanton in the County of Rutland, was created in the Baronetage of England on 4 June 1619 for Thomas Mackworth, serjeant at law. He was Sheriff of Rutland in 1599 and 1609.

The 3rd Baronet represented Rutland in the House of Commons. The 4th Baronet sat in parliament for Rutland and Portsmouth. The title became extinct on the death of the 7th Baronet in 1803.

== Mackworth baronets, of Normanton (1619) ==
- Sir Thomas Mackworth, 1st Baronet (died 1626)
- Sir Henry Mackworth, 2nd Baronet (died 1640)
- Sir Thomas Mackworth, 3rd Baronet (1624–1694).
- Sir Thomas Mackworth, 4th Baronet (died 1745)
- Sir Thomas Mackworth, 5th Baronet (died 1769)
- Sir Henry Mackworth, 6th Baronet (died 1774)
- Sir Henry Mackworth, 7th Baronet (c. 1728–1803)
