= Ysguborwen =

Historic building in Aberdare, Wales

Coordinates: 51.727°N 3.448°W

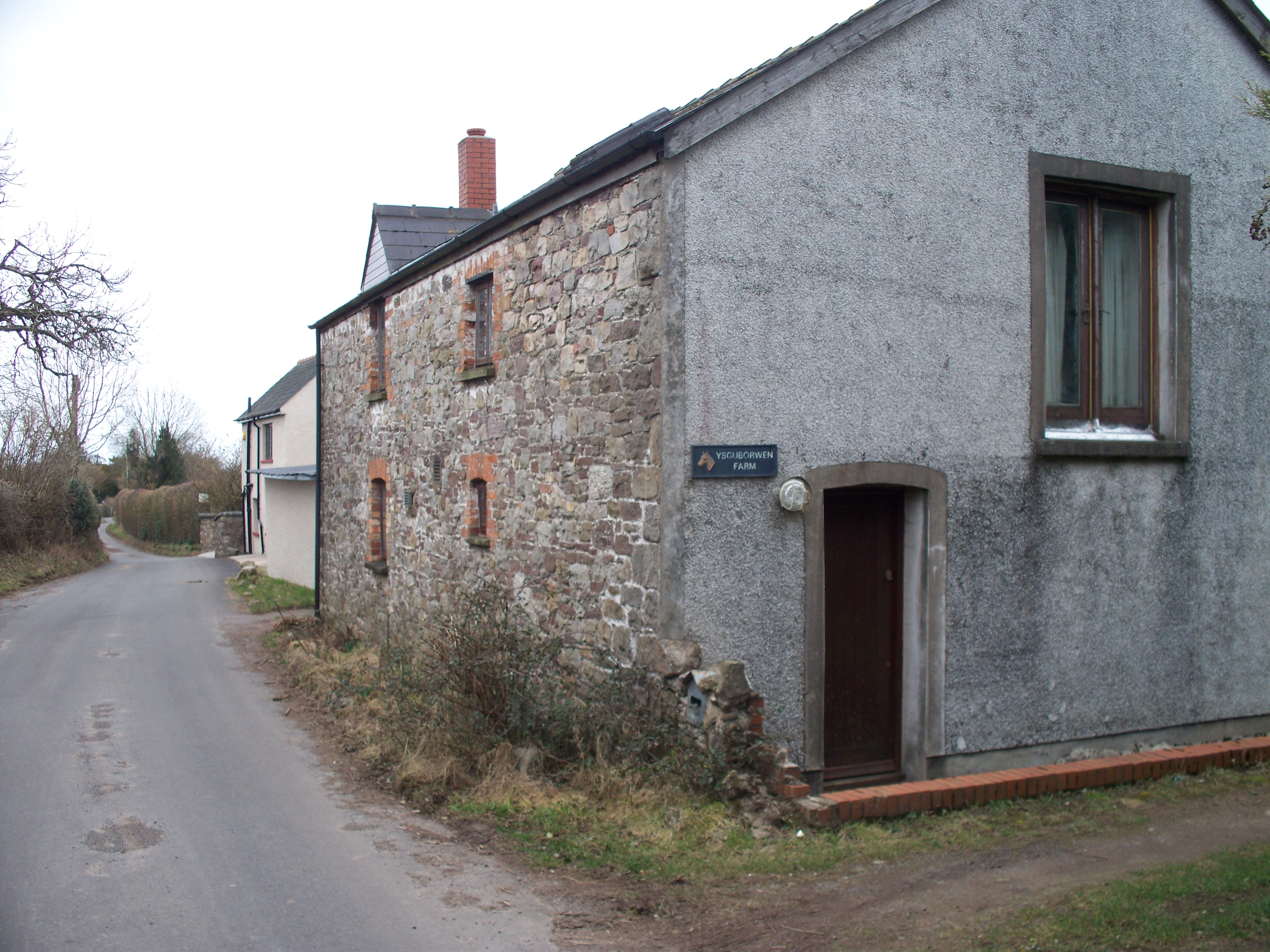

- Location within Wales Ysguborwen (the United Kingdom)

General information
- Location: Aberdare, Rhondda Cynon Taf, Wales, United Kingdom
- Construction started: 1852
- Completed: 1855

Ysguborwen is a 19th-century house in Aberdare, in the county borough of Rhondda Cynon Taf, Wales.

Ysguborwen was built by Samuel Thomas, one of the pioneers of the Welsh coal trade.

Although the Thomas family had held land in the area since at least 1477, Ysguborwen house was built between 1852 and 1855. It was here in 1856 that David Alfred Thomas, first Viscount Rhondda, was born. The South Wales Daily News described the house as, "A tasteful and imposing building." Although early profiles of D. A. Thomas describe him as 'of Ysguborwen,' D. A. Thomas actually resided at Llanwern, outside Newport, the house at Ysguborwen being occupied by his brother, J. H. Thomas.

The house is today a nursing home.

== Sources ==
- J. Vyrnwy Morgan, Life of Viscount Rhondda (London, 1819)
