= D.A. Thomas (1916 ship) =

Canadian steamship

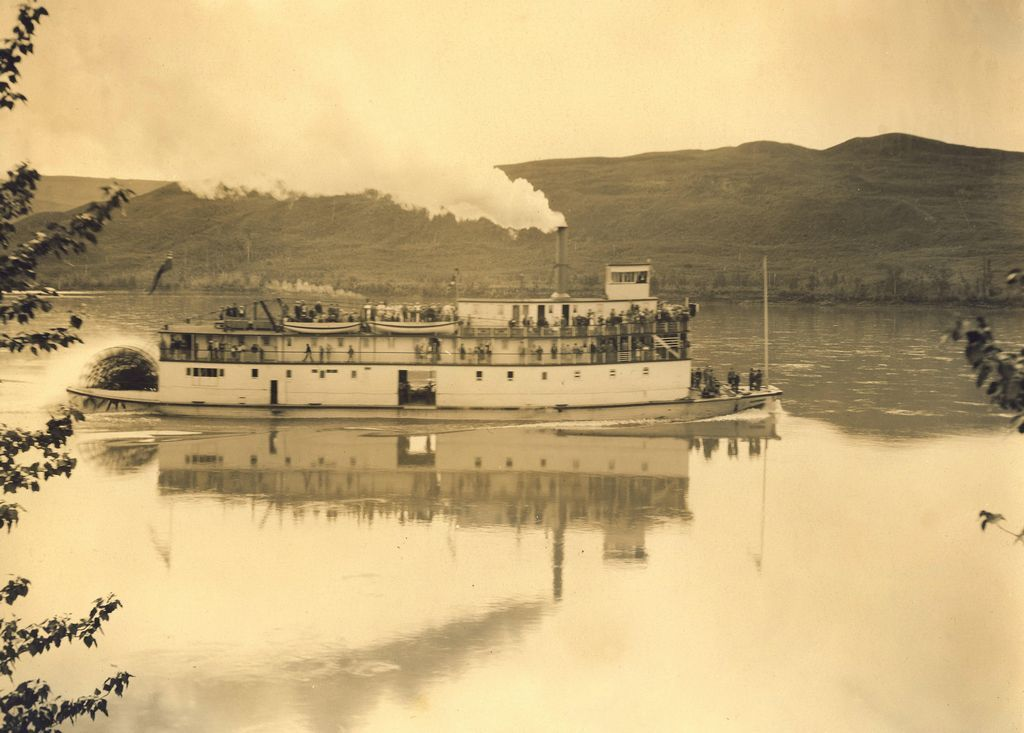
The D.A. Thomas, at Shaftesbury Trail, Alberta.

D.A. Thomas was the largest vessel to travel on the Peace River, during its riverboat era.

She was built in 1916, and operated until 1929. Her first owner was the Peace River Development Company, operated by her namesake, Welsh industrialist D. A. Thomas. She was sold to the Hudson's Bay Company in 1923.

She was built with luxurious accommodation, and her passengers included adventurous VIPs. She could carry 160 passengers.

Like all other Canadian riverboats operating on the frontier, her steam engine's boilers were fueled by the abundant wood found on the river, but Thomas specified for her to be able to be fueled by either coal or oil.

Navigation on the Peace River was barred by multiple rapids, and the D.A. Thomas was built for service between Hudson's Hope and the Vermillion Chutes.

In 1920 the D.A. Thomas made an attempt to travel up the initial portion of the Peace River Canyon, so she could load coal more directly from the coalfields at Hudson's Hope. She ran aground, and it took months to restore her to operation on the river.

By 1929 a railway had been built to Fort St. John, British Columbia, on the upper river, making water transportation less important. In response the Hudson's Bay Company decided to try to shift her to a different section of the river, by running the Vermillion Chutes. She managed to traverse the mile of white water that preceded the final drop over the chutes final rock ledge, its most significant navigational hazard. She was able to go over the bar, without damage, until her bow hit the permanent standing wave just downstream of the bar. This raised her bow, and smashed her stern wheel.

She was able to proceed down the river to Fort Fitzgerald, on the upper Slave River, but she was not repaired. She was cut down to her hull, which was used as a floating storage facility
