= Sir Abel Barker, 1st Baronet =

English politician

Sir Abel Barker, 1st Baronet (c.1616 – 1679) was an English politician. He was Member of Parliament for Rutland and he was made a baronet in 1665.

== Biography ==
Barker was the son of Abel Barker and Elizabeth Wright. In 1637 he inherited the manor of Hambleton, Rutland, from his father and he prospered as a large-scale sheep-farmer; he rented land from Edward Harington and James Harington. During the English Civil War, Barker supported Parliament and he served on the Rutland county committee. In 1646 he was appointed High Sheriff of Rutland and he served as a justice of the peace for the county between 1647 and 1653. In 1656, he was elected as a Member of Parliament for Rutland in the Second Protectorate Parliament, representing the seat until 1658. In 1659 he served as commissioner for militia in Rutland.

Barker supported the Stuart Restoration in 1660 and was a signatory of the loyal address to Charles II of England. He was proposed as a Knight of the Royal Oak in 1660 with an estate of £1,000 per year. In 1661 he stood unsuccessfully against Edward Noel for re-election to parliament. His success as a farmer and landlord enabled him to construct a manor at Lyndon, Rutland and purchase a baronetcy; on 9 September 1665 he was made a baronet, of Hambleton in the Baronetage of England. In 1679, he was again returned as the member for Rutland, but died before the Second Exclusion Parliament convened.

He was married twice, and was succeeded in his baronetcy by his son from his first marriage, Thomas. The title became extinct on the death of the second baronet in 1707.

=== Letters ===
Barker kept a letter-book, a copy of his and his family's letters. His sister Mary Barker wrote to the tailor John Swinfield in London to have a black gown made with a grass green or willow green petticoat and stomacher, and a warm winter woollen serge gown, and a scarlet serge riding coat and hood. She wanted Swinfeld's wife to buy some items for her including "cuffs of the neatest fashion."

Barker's mother Elizabeth tried to arrange a marriage for Abel with Anne Burton, daughter of Sir Thomas Burton, an old friend, who replied that the matter rested with his daughter. They married, and in 1647 she wrote to a London merchant Augustine Crofts for blue watchett sarsenet to make bed curtains and for powdered bezoar stone. Anne Burton also asked her sister Jane to shop for her and buy presents for her family including the "best fashioned gloves you can get."

Abel Barker wrote to Elizabeth Goodman at Blaston, advising against marrying her deceased husband's half-brother which he believed to be uncanonical.

After Anne died, in 1655 Barker tried to remarry with Mary Noell and with Rebekah Parsnett, who refused his offer. Mary Noell accepted, and in 1661 she wrote from Hambleton to her husband at the Dog and Ball on Fleet Street about the prevalent sickness of whooping cough and the risk to their children.

Parliament of England
Preceded by Edward Horseman; William Shield	Member of Parliament for Rutland; 1656–1658; With: William Shield	Succeeded by Edward Horseman; William Shield
Preceded by Philip Sherard; Sir Thomas Mackworth, Bt	Member of Parliament for Rutland; 1679; With: Philip Sherard	Succeeded by Philip Sherard; Sir Thomas Mackworth, Bt
Baronetage of England
New creation	Baronet (of Hambleton); 1665–1679	Succeeded by Thomas Barker
