= Llanwern steelworks =

Steelworks in South Wales, United Kingdom

Coordinates: 51.57536°N 2.89284°W

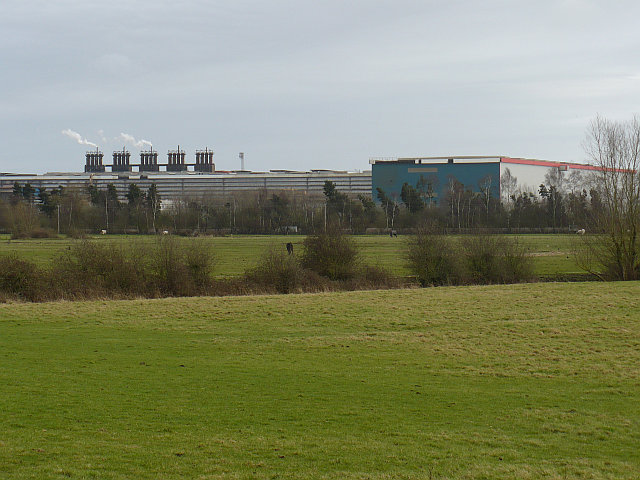
View of part of Llanwern steelworks

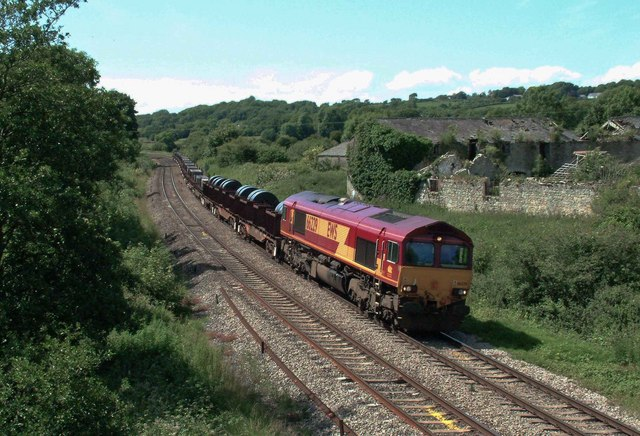
Steel coil and slab for Llanwern steelworks, being hauled by EWS Class 66

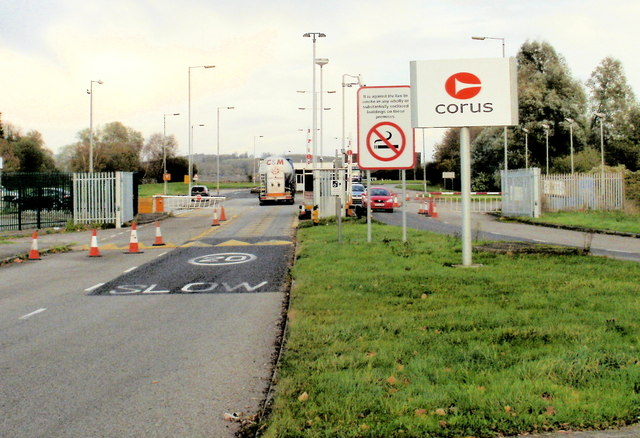
Entrance to Llanwern steelworks

Llanwern steelworks is located in Llanwern, east of the City of Newport, South Wales. Tata's operations at Llanwern include one pickle line, a cold strip mill, a hot dip galvanising line and an automotive finishing line (AFL). The works rolls 1.5 million tonnes of steel coil per annum for automotive, construction and general engineering applications. Historically, the steelworks were part of a larger industrial site, part of which has now been redeveloped as the new mixed-use community Glan Llyn.

== History ==
Built for Richard Thomas & Baldwins Ltd, the works was originally referred to locally as "The RTB", before being called Spencer Works and later Llanwern under British Steel Corporation. The steelworks site is alongside the South Wales Main Line east of Newport, offering excellent rail transport for the works.

It was the first oxygen-blown integrated steelworks in Britain when it opened in 1962. The hot strip mill pioneered the first successful use of a computer for complete mill control.

Having won an open internal competition in the 1990s with the Ravenscraig steelworks to become British Steel's leading hot strip mill, in the efforts to increase group and site efficiency in 2001 steelmaking ceased at the site with the loss of 1300 jobs. With hot steel slab now imported by rail from the sister Port Talbot steelworks, the mothballed "heavy end" of the Llanwern works was resultantly demolished in 2004.

In January 2009, Corus announced that it was mothballing the hot strip mill, with the loss of over 500 jobs. In August 2009 Corus announced that the hot strip mill would resume operations. Subsequent problems caused by the eurozone crisis forced the company to once again mothball the hot strip mill commencing 24 November 2011 with plans to re-open during late 2012. This stance was released to the press on 2 December 2011.

In 2024, the facility set a new output record of 14kt of production following the implementation of a new production line for zinc coated galvanized steel.

In 2026, the owners, Tata requested additional government funding to support steelmaking at the site. The UK Government promised to support jobs at the site with funding support from the UK National Wealth Fund.

== Regeneration ==
A £115m renewal project called Glan Llyn, led by St. Modwen Properties PLC, is currently transforming the former steel-producing part of the Llanwern steelworks site. Started in 2004, the masterplan envisages 1.5m sq ft of employment-generating accommodation hosting 6,000 jobs, 4,000 new dwellings, community facilities and open space including 3 new lakes. By January 2026, over 1,000 homes, a primary school and a business park had been built. Full completion is anticipated by 2028.

In 2022, the Spanish railway rolling stock construction company Construcciones y Auxiliar de Ferrocarriles (CAF) opened CAF Newport at Celtic Business Park (near the steelworks) to build trains primarily for the UK market, including Transport for Wales.
