= Glan Llyn =

Coordinates: 51.57201°N 2.91331°W

- Location within Newport
- OS grid reference: ST368863
- Principal area: Newport
- Country: Wales
- Sovereign state: United Kingdom
- Post town: NEWPORT
- Postcode district: NP19 4
- Dialling code: 01633; Maindee exchange Llanwern exchange
- Police: Gwent
- Fire: South Wales
- Ambulance: Welsh
- UK Parliament: Newport East

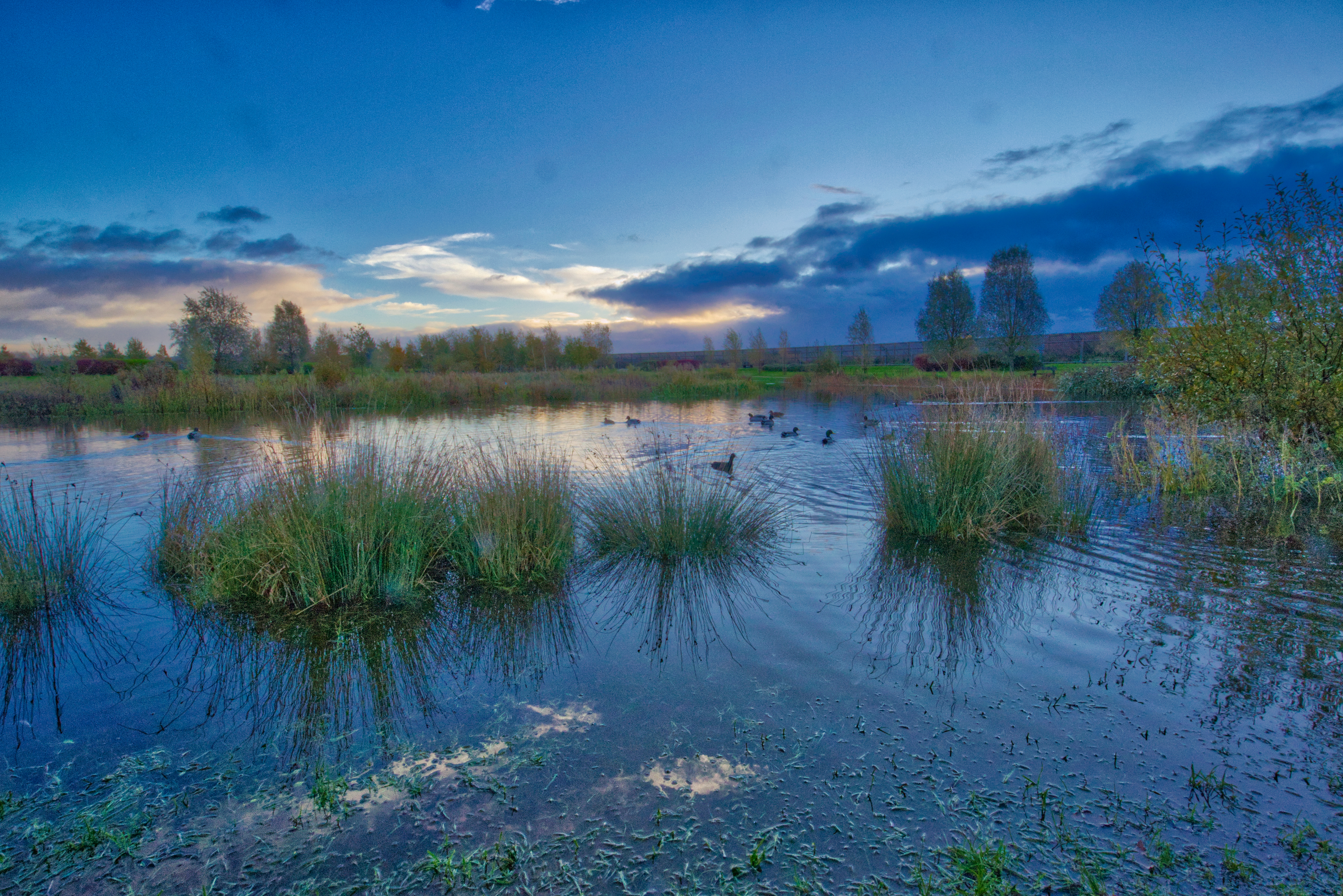
Lakeside Park - Northern End

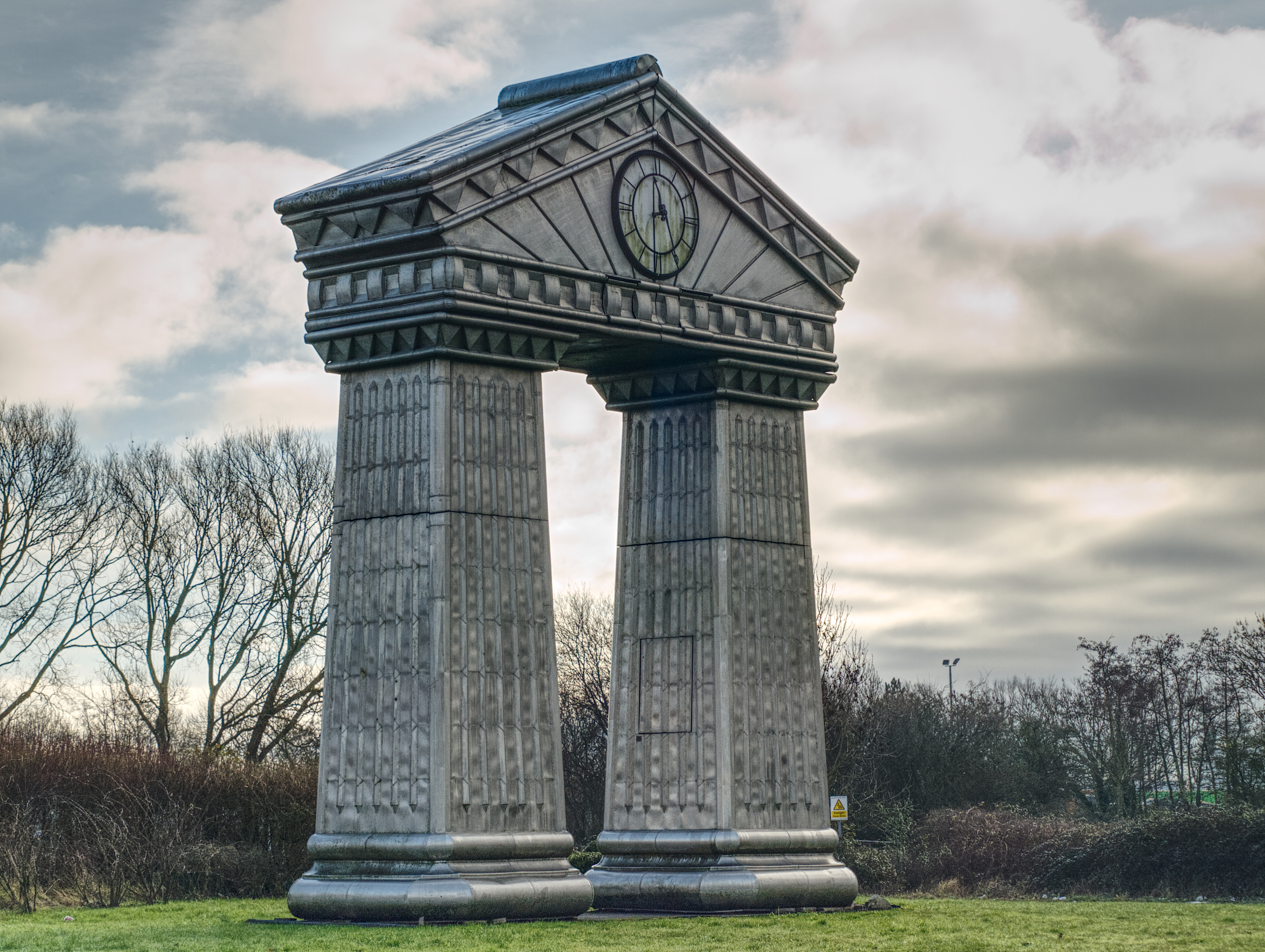
In the Nick of Time by Andy Plant

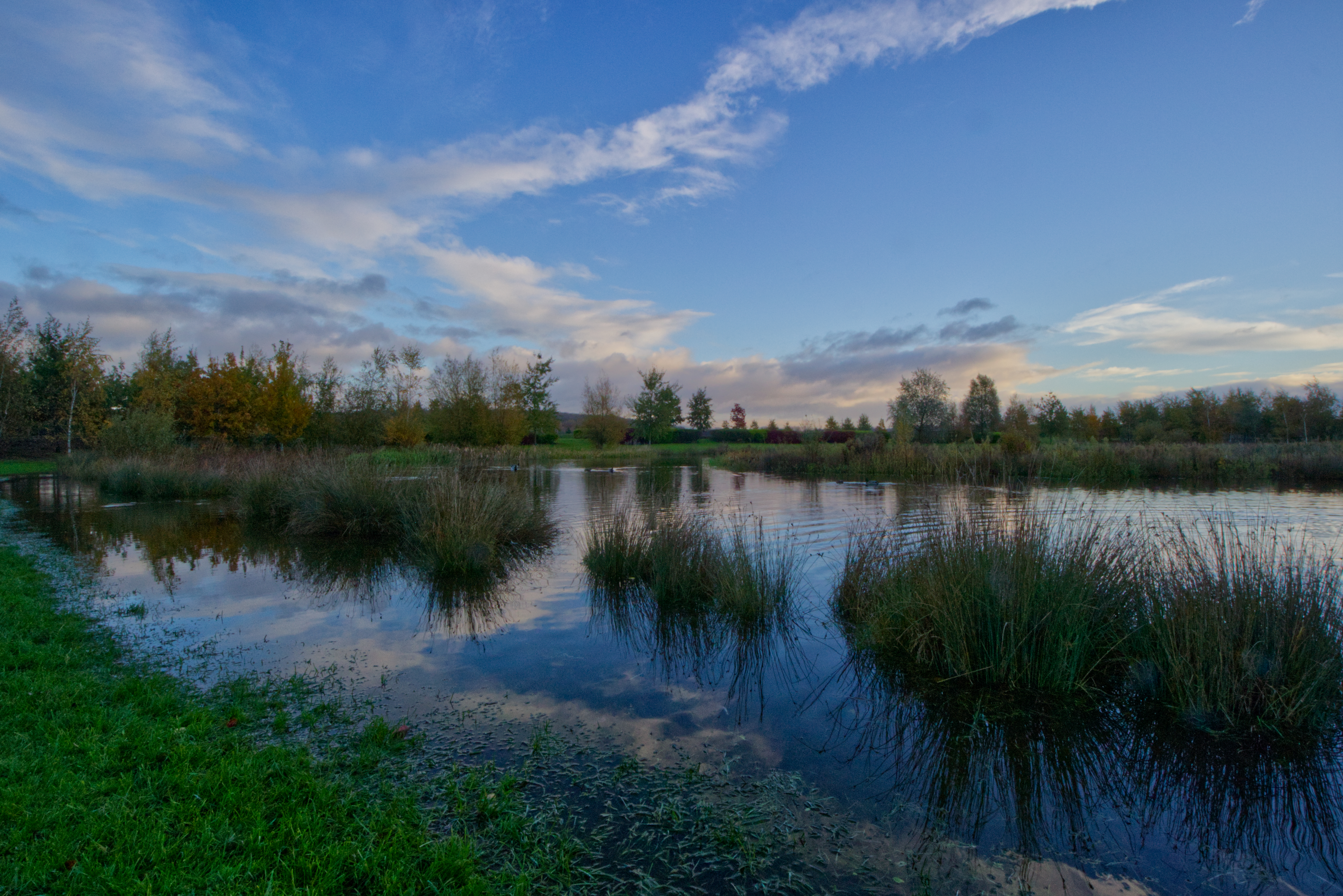
The Lake - Lakeside Park

Glan Llyn is a mixed-use community development south-east of Newport, South Wales, at the western end of the former Llanwern steelworks, on the A4810 road at the edge of the Caldicot Levels.

== Background ==
The steel production section of Llanwern steelworks closed in 2001, leading to the loss of 1,300 jobs. A finishing plant still remains in operation today. After the closure of steel production, Corus Group sought a redevelopment partner; they chose St. Modwen Properties, who in 2004 bought a 600-acre (240 ha) package of land. The redevelopment process started with the clearing of the former steelworks buildings, and making the site environmentally safe. This allowed the use of the site for a park and ride facility for the 2010 Ryder Cup event at the Celtic Manor Resort. Eventually, up to 400,000 tonnes of concrete from the former steelworks will be used in the redevelopment of the site.

== Redevelopment ==
St Modwen set out a £1 bn mixed-use redevelopment plan for the site, which it was envisaged would take 20 years to complete, in around 2026–28. The new community plan included the construction of 4,000 homes, with a supporting infrastructure that includes schools, a police station, pub/restaurant, supermarket, community centre as well as a number of open spaces including two new lakes and a water theme park, new access roads, a GPs' surgery plus health and leisure facilities. (The name Glan LLyn means "lake shore".)

The first phase was approved in April 2010 by Newport City Council; this was to create 1,330 homes, the district centre, a primary school and the west lake. After gaining specific planning permission in April 2011, Persimmon plc started work on the construction of the first 307 homes in September 2011. The Persimmon/Charles Church developments were completed in 2016. St Modwen is currently building houses around the Pools and Lakeside Parks areas of the development, and Bellway Homes commenced work on building further houses adjacent to the St Modwen site at Monk's Meadow in autumn 2016. There are plans for a railway station at the northern end of the development.

Due to its proximity to the M4 and the Prince of Wales Bridge, and relatively low property prices (compared to South West England) it has proved to be very popular with commuters working in Bristol. Its popularity has risen in recent years following the abolition of the tolls on both motorway bridges at the end of 2018.

== In the Nick of Time ==
Glan Llyn is home to the mechanical clock known as In the Nick of Time created by sculptor Andy Plant for Garden Festival Wales in 1992. The clock was removed from John Frost Square in 2008 to prepare for the redevelopment of Friars Walk in Newport City Centre.

== See also ==
- Llanwern
- Llanwern A.F.C.
