= Margaret Haig Thomas, 2nd Viscountess Rhondda =

Essayist, autobiographer, suffragette (1883–1958)

The Right Honourable The Viscountess Rhondda
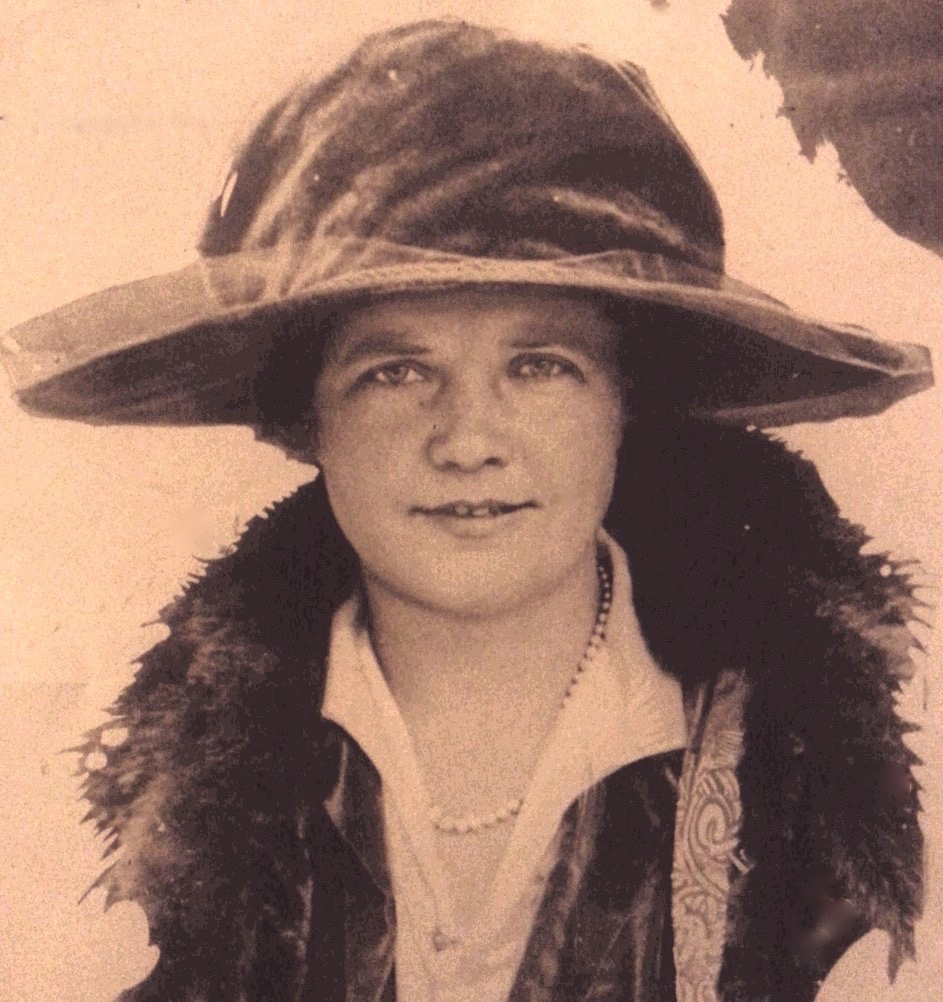
- Margaret Mackworth, c. 1915
- Born: Margaret Haig Thomas; 12 June 1883; Bayswater, London, England
- Died: 20 July 1958 (aged 75); London, England
- Education: Somerville College, Oxford
- Known for: Suffragette and women's rights campaigner; business woman; Lusitania survivor
- Spouse: Sir Humphrey Mackworth, Bt (m. 1908; div. 1922)
- Parent(s): David Alfred Thomas; Sybil Margaret Haig

Margaret Haig Mackworth, 2nd Viscountess Rhondda (née Thomas; 12 June 1883 – 20 July 1958) was a Welsh peeress, businesswoman, magazine proprietor, and suffragette.

Mackworth and her father David Alfred Thomas, 1st Viscount Rhondda were on the RMS Lusitania when the ship was torpedoed and sunk by a German U-Boat, but both survived.

== Early life ==
Margaret Haig Thomas was born on 12 June 1883 at Bayswater, London and was baptised at Saint Matthew's Church. She was the only child of the industrialist and politician David Alfred Thomas, 1st Viscount Rhondda, and Sybil Thomas, Viscountess Rhondda (née Haig), who was also a suffragette. In her autobiography, Thomas wrote that her mother had "prayed passionately that her baby daughter might become feminist," and she did become an activist for women's rights.

Thomas was raised at Llanwern House, at Llanwern near Newport, Wales, and was taught by a governess until the age of 13, when she went away to boarding school. She firstly attended Notting Hill High School then St Leonards School, in St Andrews. In 1904, aged 19, she took up a place at Somerville College, Oxford, where she studied history. Despite her tutors providing positive feedback on her academic progress, she returned to Llanwern to live with her family after two terms, then ‘came out’ to society as a debutante.

Working for her father at the Consolidated Cambrian company headquarters in Cardiff Docks, she earned a salary of £1,000, which was a significant sum at that time.

== Women's suffrage ==
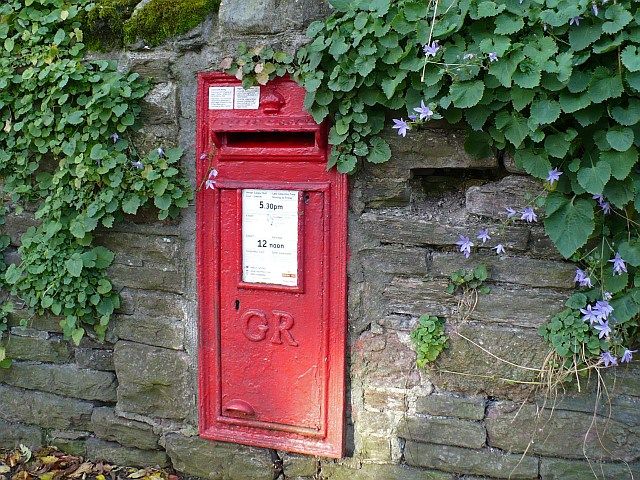
Pillar box burnt in 1913, Newport

In 1908, aged 25, Thomas joined the Women's Social and Political Union (WSPU) and became secretary of its Newport branch. Between 1908 and 1914, she took the campaign for women's suffrage across South Wales. This activity saw her attend protest marches with the Pankhurst family, address the Liberal Club in Merthyr Tydfil with Annie Kenney, and endure an attack from a crowd after she attempted to stop the prime minister's car. After she tried to ignite a Royal Mail letter-box with a chemical bomb, she was arrested and sentenced to a period of imprisonment, ended by her going on hunger strike.

Despite her imprisonment, Thomas remained committed to the women's suffrage movement, considering it a draught of fresh air in what she described as her "padded, stifled life." She was awarded a Hunger Strike Medal 'for Valour' by the WSPU. When Emmeline Pankhurst died in June 1928, Thomas, Kitty Marshall, and Rosamund Massy arranged her memorials. They raised money for her gravestone in Brompton Cemetery and a statue of her outside the House of Commons, which she had frequently been prevented from entering. Money was also raised to buy the painting that had been made by the fellow suffragette Georgina Brackenbury, so that it could be given to the National Portrait Gallery. It was unveiled by Stanley Baldwin in 1930.

== First World War and sinking of RMS Lusitania ==
On the outbreak of the World War I, Thomas accepted the decision by the WSPU leadership to abandon its militant campaign for suffrage for the duration of the war. She was by this time working for her father as his confidential secretary and ‘right-hand man’. Thomas had great pride and belief in his daughter, and had argued with her on equal terms since she was twelve or thirteen. She travelled with him when he was sent by David Lloyd George to the United States to arrange the supply of munitions for the British armed forces.

Her father became aware of his daughter's depressive state, and although she brushed her father's concern aside, he became aware of tensions within her marriage. On 7 May 1915, she was returning from the United States on the RMS Lusitania with her father and his secretary, Arnold Rhys-Evans, when it was torpedoed at 14:10 by German submarine U-20. Her father and his secretary made it onto a lifeboat since they had been blown overboard, but she spent a long period in the water clinging to a piece of board before she was rescued by the Irish trawler Bluebell, as recalled in her 1933 autobiography, This Was My World. By the time she was rescued and taken to Queenstown, she had fallen unconscious from hypothermia. After a period in hospital, she then spent several months recuperating at her parents' home.

During the war, Rhondda helped to place Belgian refugees in Monmouthshire and was then employed by the government to encourage women to undertake war work in essential industries, most notably in agriculture. In early 1918, she was promoted to Chief Controller of women's recruitment at the Ministry of National Service in London to advise on women's recruitment policy.

== Peerage ==
On 3 July 1918 her father died. While the Rhondda Barony died with him, the title of Viscount Rhondda passed to Margaret by special remainder, which Thomas had insisted on from King George V when he was offered the honour.

After her father's death, Lady Rhondda subsequently tried to take his seat in the House of Lords by citing the Sex Disqualification (Removal) Act 1919 which allowed women to exercise "any public office". After initially being accepted, the Committee of Privileges membership was altered and her request was rejected. When rejecting her petition the Lord Chancellor, Viscount Birkenhead LC, said: “On many grounds I regret this circumstance, for that history would upon its personal side have been worthy of the massive irony of Gibbon.” She was supported for many years by Waldorf Astor, 2nd Viscount Astor, whose wife Nancy Astor, Viscountess Astor had been the first woman to take a seat in the House of Commons.

Shortly after Lady Rhondda's death in 1958, women entered the Lords for the first time thanks to the Life Peerages Act 1958. Five years later, with the passage of the Peerage Act 1963, hereditary peeresses were also allowed to enter the Lords.

== Business interests ==
She succeeded her father as chair of the Sanatogen Company in February 1917. In total, she was a director of 33 companies throughout her life, chairing six, having inherited 28 directorships from her father. Most of her business interests were in coal, steel and shipping via Consolidated Cambrian Ltd. She was passionate about increasing the number of women in the corporate world, and was one of the best-known businesswoman in Britain. However, with the slump in coal prices during the late 1920s, the collieries of Consolidated Cambrian fell into receivership, and its assets were later sold to GKN. After the collapse of Consolidated Cambrian, her personal accounts show that her outgoings always exceeded her income.

In the summer of 1919, Rhondda was involved in creating and chairing the Efficiency Club, a networking organisation for British businesswomen, which she envisioned would have four aims: to promote greater efficiency and co-operation between established businesses and professional women, to encourage leadership and self reliance amongst all women workers, to form a link between businesses and professional women for their mutual benefit and to work towards the admission of women to the British Chambers of Commerce.

She was elected as the Institute of Directors' first female president in 1926, having been a member of its Council since 1923. In 2015, the Institute launched the annual Mackworth Lecture in her honour.

== Women's rights ==
In 1918, Rhondda lobbied for the government's proposed Ministry of Health to have women properly represented by an all-woman advisory council, and she formed a Watching Group to monitor progress. Rhondda wanted more than a few token women on committees, and was especially concerned that the importance of maternity and infant welfare should be recognised. In the event, the government's new Ministry of Health Act 1919 created a Consultative Council on General Health Questions which had a majority of women members and which was chaired by Rhondda herself.

In 1919, Rhondda founded the Women’s Industrial League, with Violet Key Jones appointed as general and organising secretary. The League aimed to seek equal training and employment opportunities for women in industry, and to resist a return to pre-war conditions which largely designated women's labour as unskilled with low pay and poor prospects. She was concerned that the Ministry of Labour seemed to recognise only three forms of work for women – tailoring, laundry and domestic service. The Women's Industrial League publicised the issue and tried to hold the government to its war-time promises relating to working women.

In 1920, Rhondda took advantage of the Sex Disqualification (Removal) Act 1919 to become one of the first four women justices of the peace in the County of Monmouth though she did not sit often.

In May 1926, Rhondda was a founding member of the Open Door Council which was formed to advocate for equal pay, status and opportunity for women. As such, in 1929 she led a deputation to the Home Secretary asking him to repeal the Factory and Workshop Act 1901 which prevented women taking well-paid jobs in mining and other industries.

== Time and Tide ==
Aside from inheriting her father's publishing interests, Rhondda had founded in 1920 Time and Tide magazine, at first a left-wing feminist weekly magazine, but later a more rightist general literary journal. She was the long-time editor of the magazine and sustained it with a large portion of her inheritance.

Rhondda recalled that she had always wanted to edit a paper. She knew that most weekly reviews lost money, but accepted this as the price of getting at the "keystone people", the inner group in society who influenced the general public. Rhondda appointed an all-woman board and ensured that the journal was entirely controlled, staffed and edited by women. She took over the editorship herself in 1926 and continued in the post until her death. George Bernard Shaw, who wrote for the paper, was one of those who had a high opinion of her abilities as an editor and, according to Rebecca West, who was also a contributor, she insisted on a high standard of writing.

Rhondda saw Time and Tide primarily as a platform from which to advocate women's equality and the journal constantly drew attention to women's advances such as the election of women to parliament, the appointment of women as magistrates and as members of juries, and the granting of degrees to women at Oxford University. Under her editorship the journal became "an innovative, imaginative and adaptable weekly paper," which achieved a circulation of between 12,000 and 15,000 copies.

In 1928, Rhondda gave the journal an enhanced literary focus, publishing more book reviews and work by modern women novelists including Virginia Woolf, Vita Sackville-West, and Rebecca West. From 1931 there was a new emphasis on international issues and world politics. In the 1940s the journal's content became increasingly right-wing as Rhondda's own political views moved to the right. Circulation then rose to 40,000 despite the loss of progressive readers, but Rhondda still had to subsidise the journal out of her own funds.

== Six Point Group ==
In 1921, Rhondda set up and chaired the Six Point Group, an action group that focused heavily on the equality between men and women and the rights of the child.

The group's manifesto of equal rights for women within the workplace and for mothers and children sought the following:

- Satisfactory legislation on child assault
- Satisfactory legislation for the widowed mother
- Satisfactory legislation for the unmarried mother and her child
- Equal rights for Guardianship for married parents
- Equal pay for Teachers
- Equal opportunities for men and women in the Civil Service

These were issues which had not been covered by the Sex Disqualification (Removal) Act 1919 and which Rhondda believed to be easily understandable and attainable. They had all been considered and debated publicly, and some could be achieved without the need for parliamentary legislation. Rhondda argued, for example, that if the government stopped dismissing women civil servants when they married, local authorities would probably follow suit.

The Representation of the People Act 1918 had given women the vote only if they were over 30 and fulfilled a property qualification. In 1926 Rhondda focussed the Six Point Group on equal rights and led it in a new campaign to complete the enfranchisement of women, starting with a mass demonstration in Hyde Park. The Equal Political Rights Campaign Committee was then formed with Rhondda in the chair. Further demonstrations, meetings and lobbying followed until the Representation of the People (Equal Franchise) Act 1928 finally gave women over twenty-one the vote on the same terms as men.

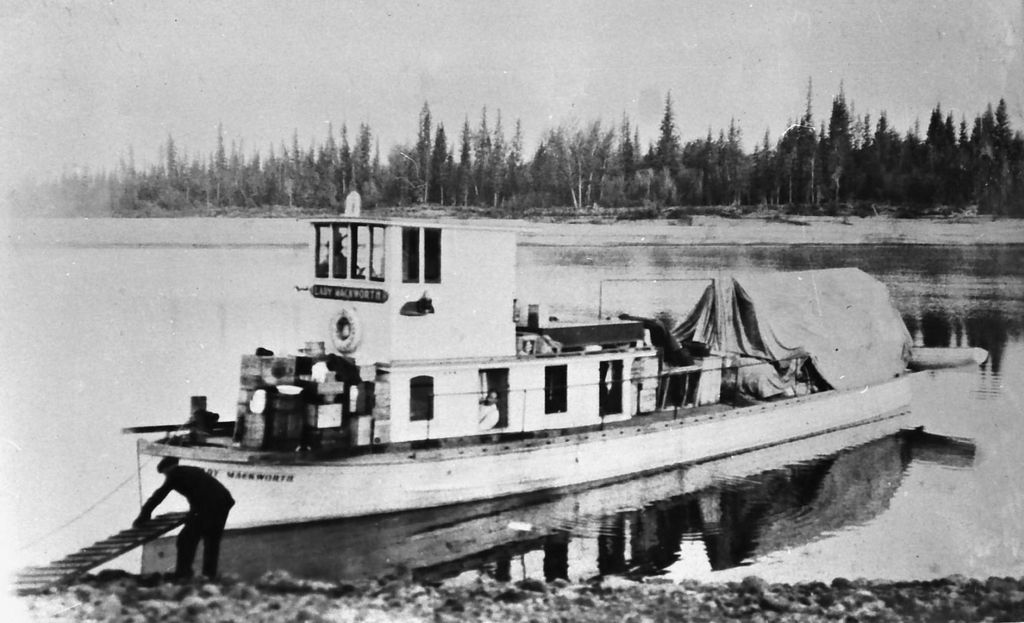
The Lady Mackworth

A Canadian steamship, the Lady Mackworth, was named after her.

== Personal life ==
In 1908 she married Humphrey Mackworth, who later inherited his father's baronetcy. They divorced in December 1922. She never remarried. She lived with Time and Tide magazine editor Helen Archdale in the late 1920s. She was close friends with Winifred Holtby, the author of South Riding, which led to jealousy from Holtby's dear friend, the writer Vera Brittain. She subsequently spent 25 years living with writer and editor Theodora Bosanquet, who acted as amanuensis to Henry James from 1907 to 1916.

== Posthumous recognition ==
In 2015, the annual Mackworth Lecture was launched by the Institute of Directors in her honour.

Her name and picture (and those of 58 other women's suffrage supporters) are on the plinth of the statue of Millicent Fawcett in Parliament Square, London, unveiled in 2018.

Lady Rhondda was one of five women shortlisted in 2019 to be portrayed in the first statue of a woman to be erected in Cardiff. Subsequently, the Monumental Welsh Women campaign aimed to erect statues in Wales of all five women. Statues depicting Betty Campbell, Elaine Morgan and Cranogwen have since been unveiled, with one for Elizabeth Andrews planned for 2025. The Lady Rhondda statue was created by artist Jane Robbins and was installed in Newport on 25 September 2024. The statue includes a circle of hands cast from about forty women’s hands, among them the hands of Olivette Otele and Helen Ward.

== Arms ==
Coat of arms of Margaret Haig Thomas, 2nd Viscountess Rhondda
Escutcheon Per pale Ermine and Ermines three chevronels Gules between as many eagles displayed Or collared of the third. Supporters To the dexter a miner resting the exterior hand upon a shovel to the sinister a like miner holding in the interior hand a safety lamp and in the exterior hand a pickaxe over the shoulder all Proper. Motto Dilligentia Absque Timore

== See also ==
- History of feminism
- List of suffragists and suffragettes

Peerage of the United Kingdom
Preceded by David Alfred Thomas	Viscountess Rhondda; 1919–1958	Extinct
