= Glen Usk, Llanhennock =

Glen Usk
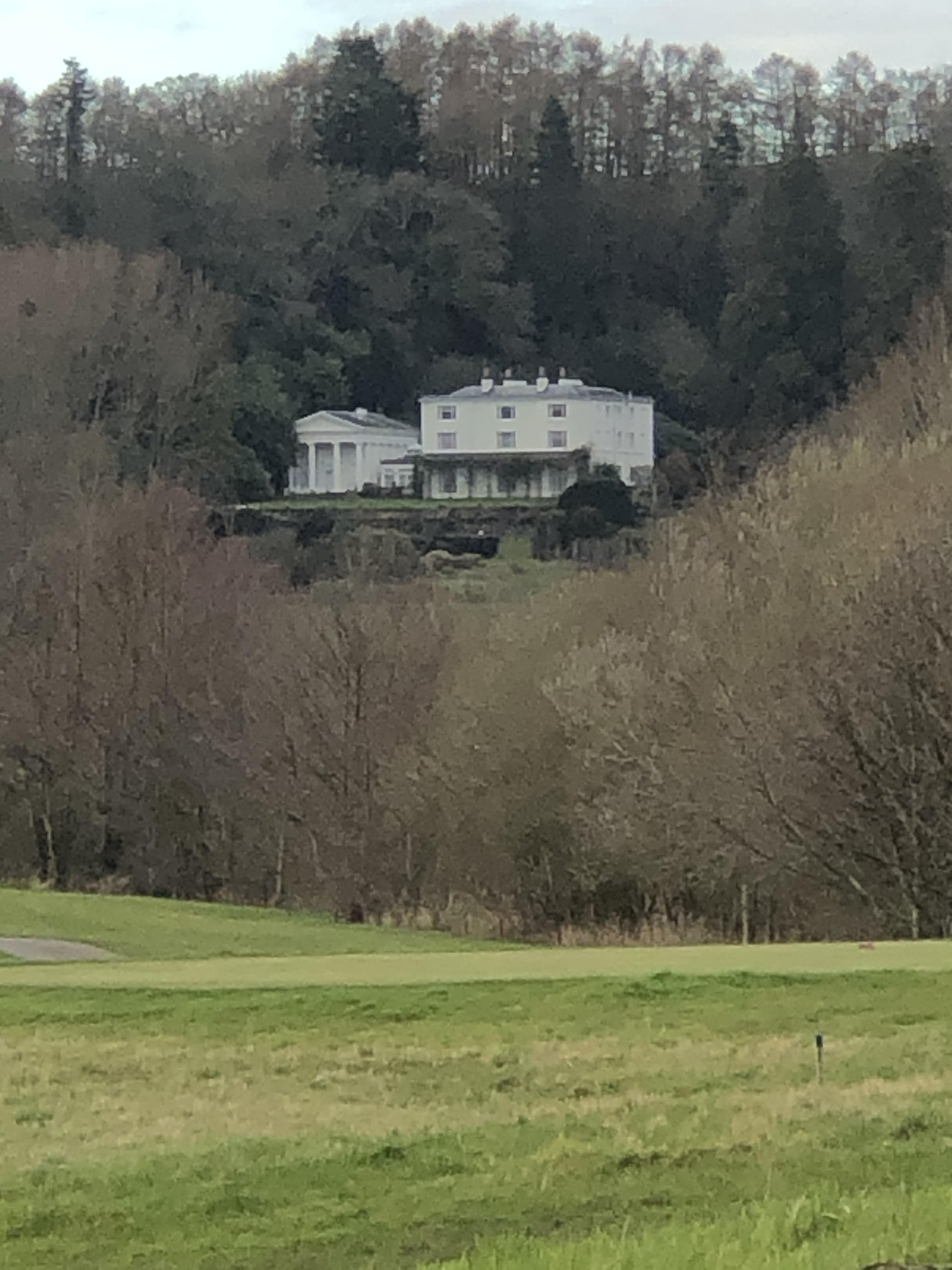
- "An exquisite, white-rendered Neoclassical villa"

- Location within Monmouthshire
- 51.6293°N 2.9211°W
- Type: House
- Location: Llanhennock, Monmouthshire

History
- Built: 1820

Site notes
- Architectural style: Neo Classical
- Governing body: Privately owned

Listed Building – Grade II*
- Official name: Glen Usk
- Designated: 4 March 1952
- Reference no.: 2697

Listed Building – Grade II
- Official name: Temple at Glen Usk
- Designated: 18 November 1980
- Reference no.: 2698

Listed Building – Grade II
- Official name: Stable Court and fountain at Glen Usk
- Designated: 22 April 2005
- Reference no.: 84372

Listed Building – Grade II
- Official name: Garden walls, steps and terracing at Glen Usk
- Designated: 22 April 2005
- Reference no.: 84370

Cadw/ICOMOS Register of Parks and Gardens of Special Historic Interest in Wales
- Official name: Glen Usk
- Designated: 1 February 2022
- Reference no.: PGW(Gt)36(Mon)
- Listing: Grade II

Glen Usk, Llanhennock, Monmouthshire is a country house dating from 1820. It was built for Sir Digby Mackworth, Bt. in the Neoclassical style. The house is Grade II* listed and the adjoining temple, and other associated structures, have their own Grade II listings. The gardens are included on the Cadw/ICOMOS Register of Parks and Gardens of Special Historic Interest in Wales.

== History ==
The Mackworth family's place on the lowest rung of the aristocratic ladder was secured by Sir Digby's father, Sir Herbert Mackworth, 1st Baronet, a lawyer and landowner from Glamorganshire, who was created a baronet in 1776. Inheriting the title in 1795, on the death of his brother, Sir Digby began the building of Glen Usk circa. 1820. His architect is unknown.

The house was remodelled in the 1840s, when the adjacent structure in the style of a Greek temple was added as a picture gallery. The architectural historian John Newman notes its "uncomfortably stout" fluted columns. The temple was converted to a billiard room and library in about 1900. Apart from some alterations to the surrounding landscape in the early 20th century, the house is largely unaltered since this time. It remains a private residence, and was recently restored. The house was marketed for sale throughout 2022-4.

== Architecture and description ==
Newman describes Glen Usk as "an exquisite, white-rendered Neoclassical villa". Of three storeys, with three bays, the house is faced with rendered stucco and has replacement slate roofs. Writing of the house in the early 1950s, Tyerman and Warner described it as a "big, yellow stucco house, with a splendid terrace". It is a Grade II* listed building, its listing record noting the "high level of original or early detail, including good interiors". The surrounding landscape was remodelled in the 1920s. The temple, stable court, pergola, gate piers, and garden terraces have their own Grade II listings. The gardens themselves are listed at Grade II on the Cadw/ICOMOS Register of Parks and Gardens of Special Historic Interest in Wales.
