= Sir Thomas Mackworth, 3rd Baronet =

English politician (1624–1694)

Sir Thomas Mackworth, 3rd Baronet (1 May 1624 – 28 November 1694) was an English politician.

== Biography ==
Mackworth was born on 1 May 1624, the son of Sir Henry Mackworth, 2nd Baronet of Normanton Hall and Mary Hopton, daughter of Robert Hopton. In 1640, he inherited his father's baronetcy. He was a Royalist during the English Civil War; he was fined as a delinquent in March 1648. Mackworth served as High Sheriff of Rutland from 1666 to 1667.

In 1679, Mackworth was elected as a Member of Parliament for Rutland. He was returned for the seat again in 1680, 1685 and 1689. In Parliament, he opposed James II's religious policy and as a result he was excluded from the lieutenancy of Rutland in 1688. He was included on a blacklist of Convention Parliament MPs compiled by Anthony Rowe after rejecting the notion that James II had abdicated during the Glorious Revolution. However, during the 2nd Parliament of William III and Mary II, Mackworth was classed as a Whig by the Marquess of Carmarthen. On 6 February 1692, he was granted leave of absence for reasons of ill-health, and he died of smallpox on 28 November 1694, aged 70.

Parliament of England
Preceded by Philip Sherard; Edward Noel	Member of Parliament for Rutland; 1679; With: Philip Sherard	Succeeded by Philip Sherard; Sir Abel Barker, Bt
Preceded by Philip Sherard; Sir Abel Barker, Bt	Member of Parliament for Rutland; 1680–1681; With: Philip Sherard	Succeeded by Philip Sherard; Edward Fawkener
Preceded by Philip Sherard; Edward Fawkener	Member of Parliament for Rutland; 1685–1694; With: Baptist Noel (1685–1689); Bennet Sherard (1689–1694)	Succeeded by Bennet Sherard; Sir Thomas Mackworth, Bt
Baronetage of England
Preceded by Henry Mackworth	Baronet (of Normanton); 1640–1694	Succeeded by Thomas Mackworth
