= J. Vyrnwy Morgan =

John Vyrnwy Morgan (21 March 1860 – 9 August 1925), usually known as J. Vyrnwy Morgan, was a Welsh Congregationalist minister and author.

== Early life ==
Born at 166, Park Row, Cwmafan, 21 March 1860, second son of John Morgan, J. Vyrnwy Morgan was admitted as a member of Seion Congregational Church, Cwmafan, at the age of 13. He trained for the ministry at Aberavon Academy, and Memorial College, Brecon. While in Brecon he met and fell in love with Sarah Edwards, daughter of the minister of Watergate Baptist Chapel, Brecon. They were married in 1884 at Christchurch Congregational Chapel, Oswestry. They were to have four surviving children, three sons and a daughter.

Morgan was ordained in 1884, and took charge of the Congregational mission at Llanwddyn, where he ministered to the villagers and the workmen engaged in the construction of the Liverpool Waterworks at Lake Vyrnwy. In 1889 he moved from here to Liverpool, where he pastored Burlington Street Congregational Chapel. Much of the ministry at Burlington Street was conducted with the aim of reaching out to the poor of the district around the chapel. He left Liverpool in late 1891, intending to take a pastorate in Cardiff.

Illness prevented Vyrnwy Morgan from taking up the difficult work he had planned to do in Cardiff. Instead, Morgan accepted an invitation from the English Congregational Church in Pontypridd, where he started in 1892. Difficulties with the pastor of the Welsh Congregational Church caused Morgan to leave the chapel in 1893, accepting a pastorate at York Road Chapel, Lambeth. In London, Morgan became known as a hard-working, enthusiastic minister, his wife, Sarah, filling his pulpit on a number of occasions. Thomas Edward Ellis also spoke at the chapel, and it was rumoured that Vyrnwy Morgan was planning to enter parliament.

In September 1895, Morgan was baptised by total immersion at Watergate Chapel, Brecon, his father-in-law performing the rite. This change of denomination meant a change of pulpits, and in November 1895, John Vyrnwy Morgan was inducted to the Pastorate of Tabernacle English Baptist Chapel, Waun Wen, Swansea. While here, he published his first book, a life of Kilsby Jones, which met with critical acclaim.

The pastorate was not a success, and in 1897 Morgan left for American, where he accepted the pastorate of First Baptist Church Omaha, Nebraska. In 1899, Vyrnwy Morgan left Nebraska, on account of his wife's poor health, which he attributed to the climate, relocating to Denver. The move was too late for his wife, who died there on New Year's Day 1900. A pastorate at North Avenue Baptist Church in Baltimore, Maryland followed, where Morgan edited a collection of essays on theology, issued under the title Theology at the Dawn of the Twentieth Century. However, the death of his talented and enthusiastic wife, Sarah, seriously affected Vyrnwy Morgan. Once an outspoken teetotaller, he began to drink. The nadir came when he was arrested for shoplifting. In 1903, he returned to Wales, hoping to carve out a new career.

== Later life ==
On his return to Wales, Morgan settled in Cardiff. He joined Star Street Congregational Church, preaching at a number of chapels in Cardiff and its surrounding settlements. On the few occasions he preached after this date, it was under Bishop's Licence. He edited two collections of biographical articles, Welsh Religious Leaders in the Victorian Era (1905), and Welsh Political and Educational Leaders in the Victorian Era (1908).

In 1908, Morgan left Cardiff, spending some time at the family home in Cwmafan, following the death of his father, before moving to West Wales, initially settling at Aberystwyth. In 1909, Morgan published The Welsh Religious Revival 1904-5: A Retrospect and a Criticism, a book which was severely critical of the part played in the Revival by Evan Roberts.

It was in 1909 that Vyrnwy Morgan finally broke with Nonconformity, being received into the Church of England, Although he occasionally spoke under special bishop's licence, he was not re-ordained, although he continued to style himself 'Reverend'.

The same year, Morgan married Margaret Greig of Edinburgh, by whom he had one child, a daughter, Jean (born November 1910).

At the 1910 General Elections, Vyrnwy Morgan was a visible and vocal Conservative supporter, addressing audiences in England and Wales. While his chief target was the Liberal Government's plans to disestablish the Church of England in Wales, he also attacked the Government's fiscal policy. He was extremely critical of David Lloyd George, a former acquaintance from his days as a Nonconformist minister.

He would publish seven more books, A Study in Nationality (1911); The Philopsophy of Welsh History (1914); The War and Wales (1916); The Church in Wales in the Light of History (1918); The Life of Viscount Rhondda (1919); The Bible in the Light of Modern Thought' (1922); and the Welsh Mind in Evolution (1925).

Morgan's books on Wales, which contained stringent criticisms of Welsh nationalism, were controversial in his day, and this contributed to their failure to bring Vrynwy Morgan critical or financial success. In 1914, Morgan moved from Aberystwyth to Tenby. An attempt was made to secure a Civil List Pension for Morgan, but this was declined in 1923, Morgan receiving only a gift from the Royal Bounty, in recognition of his hardship.

Morgan died on 9 August 1925 at his home, Glan-y-Mor, Tenby. He is buried in Tenby Cemetery. A number of his books have been reprinted since his death.

== Sources ==
- Edward Millward, ‘John Vyrnwy Morgan’, National Library of Wales Journal, XII (1961).
- ‘The Preacher and the Critic: Margam Jones and Vyrnwy Morgan’, Transactions of the Port Talbot Historical Society, 2:3 (1981)
- Gerard Charmley ‘J. Vyrnwy Morgan: Wales in Another Light’, Welsh History Review, 24 (2008).
- Morgan Monument, Tenby Cemetery.

== Bibliography ==
- Morgan, J. Vyrnwy: Life and Sayings of Kilsby Jones (Swansea: Cambria Daily Leader, 1896).
- Morgan, J. Vyrnwy (ed.): The Cambro-American Pulpit (New York and London: Funk & Wagnalls, 1898).
- Morgan, J. Vyrnwy (ed.): Theology at the Dawn of the Twentieth Century (Boston, Mass.: Small, Maynard & Company, 1901).
- Morgan, J. Vyrnwy (ed.): Welsh Religious Leaders in the Victorian Era (London: James Nisbet & Company, 1905).
- Morgan, J. Vyrnwy (ed.): Welsh Political and Educational Leaders in the Victorian Era (London: James Nisbet & Company, 1908).
- Morgan, J. Vyrnwy: The Welsh Religious Revival 1904-5 (London: Chapman & Hall, 1909, 2004).
- Morgan, J. Vyrnwy: A Study in Nationality (London: Chapman & Hall, 1911).
- Morgan, J. Vyrnwy (writing as Viator Cambrensis): The Rise and Decline of Welsh Nonconformity: An Impartial Investigation (London: Sir Isaac Pitman, 1912).
- Morgan, J. Vyrnwy: The Philosophy of Welsh History (London: John Lane, 1914).
- Morgan, J. Vyrnwy: The War and Wales (London, Chapman & Hall, 1916).
- Morgan, J. Vyrnwy: The Church in Wales in the Light of History (London: Chapman & Hall, 1918).
- Morgan, J. Vyrnwy: The Life of Viscount Rhondda (London: H. R. Allenson, 1919).
- Morgan, J. Vyrnwy: The Bible in the Light of Modern Thought (London: H. R. Allenson, 1922)
- Morgan, J. Vyrnwy: The Welsh Mind in Evolution (London: H. R. Allenson, 1925
