= Philip Sherard (MP) =

English soldier, landowner and politician

The Honourable Philip Sherard

Member of Parliament for Rutland
- In office 1660–1685 Serving with Samuel Browne, Edward Noel, Sir Abel Barker, Sir Thomas Mackworth, Edward Fawkener
- Preceded by: Sir James Harington; Thomas Waite
- Succeeded by: Baptist Noel; Sir Thomas Mackworth

Personal details
- Born: 17 November 1623
- Died: 1695 (aged 71–72)
- Spouse: Margaret Eure (after 1645)
- Relations: 4, including Philip Sherard, 2nd Earl of Harborough (grandson)
- Children: Bennet Sherard
- Parent(s): William Sherard, 1st Baron Sherard; Abigail Cave
- Education: St John's College, Oxford

The Hon. Philip Sherard (17 November 1623 – 1695) was an English soldier, landowner and politician who sat in the House of Commons from 1660 to 1685.

== Early life ==
Sherard was born on 17 November 1623 as the younger son of William Sherard, 1st Baron Sherard, (1588–1640) and his wife Abigail Cave (1593–1659). His older brother was Bennet Sherard, 2nd Baron Sherard, who sat as MP for Leicestershire and served as Lord Lieutenant of Rutland. His nephew was Bennet Sherard, 1st Earl of Harborough. His mother, the widow of Henry Tresham (with whom she had several sons), was a daughter of Cecil Cave and Anne (née Bennett) Cave.

He was a student at St John's College, Oxford, in 1639, and travelled abroad in Italy in 1641.

== Career ==
Sherard went abroad with his brother shortly before the Civil War, where he became a captain in the Dutch army. He enjoyed field sports and settled at the family estate of Whissendine, Rutland, holding no local office until the Restoration.

In 1660, Sherard was elected Member of Parliament for Rutland in the Convention Parliament. He was one of those proposed as Knight of the Royal Oak, and his estate had a yearly income of £600. In 1661, he was re-elected MP for Rutland in the Cavalier parliament, probably without a contest. He was re-elected in the two elections for the First and Second Exclusion Parliaments and again in 1681.

In 1682, he was removed from local office, and took no further part in politics, his son Bennet replacing him as knight of the shire in the Convention.

== Personal life ==
In 1645, Sherard was married to Margaret Eure, widow of both John Pulteney of Misterton, Leicestershire, and a Cavalier Col. Hon. William Eure of Old Malton (son of Lord Eure), and daughter of Sir Thomas Denton of Hillesden, Buckinghamshire. Margaret converted to Protestantism. Together, they were the parents of three sons and one daughter, including:

- Bennet Sherard (1649–1701), who was also MP for Rutland.
- Philip Sherard, who married and had issue.
- Denton Sherard.
- Abigail Sherard (b. 1652), who married John Pickering, Esq. (1654–1703) and had issue.

Sherard died at the age of 71 and was buried at Whissendine on 4 March 1695.

=== Descendants ===
Through his son Bennet, he was a grandfather of Philip Sherard, 2nd Earl of Harborough, (c. 1680–1750), who inherited the Harborough earldom through special remainder, and Margaret Sherard, the wife of The Most Rev. John Gilbert, Archbishop of York.

Parliament of England
| Preceded by Sir James Harington; Thomas Waite | Member of Parliament for Rutland; 1660–1685; With: Samuel Browne 1660–1661; Sir Thomas Mackworth 1679–1679; Sir Abel Barker 1679–1680; Sir Thomas Mackworth 1680–1681; Edward Fawkener 1681–1685 | Succeeded by Baptist Noel; Sir Thomas Mackworth |
