= Sybil Thomas, Viscountess Rhondda =

British suffragette, feminist and philanthropist

The Right Honourable The Viscountess Rhondda DBE
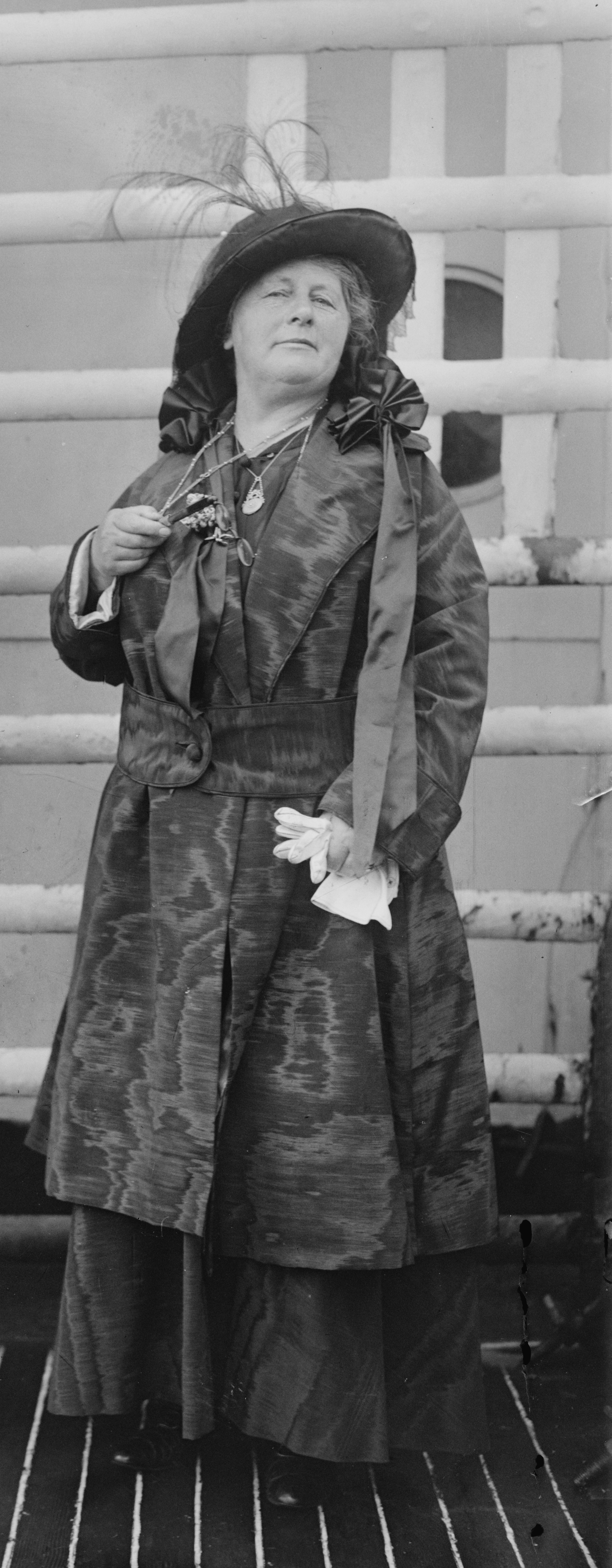

Chairman of the Women's Advisory Committee, National War Savings Committee
- In office c. 1914 – c. 1918

Personal details
- Born: Sybil Margaret Haig; 25 February 1857 Brighton, Sussex, England
- Died: 11 March 1941 (aged 84)
- Occupation: Suffragette, feminist, philanthropist

Sybil Margaret Thomas, Viscountess Rhondda, DBE (née Haig; 25 February 1857 – 11 March 1941) was a British suffragette, feminist, and philanthropist.

== Early life and marriage ==
She was born in Brighton, daughter of George Augustus Haig, a merchant and landowner from Pen Ithon, Radnorshire, Wales, who was of Scottish descent and was a cousin of Douglas Haig, and his wife Anne Eliza (née Fell). Her sister was the suffragette Janet Boyd.

On 27 June 1882, she married David Alfred Thomas, a Welsh industrialist who later became Liberal Member of Parliament for Merthyr Boroughs. Their principal residence was Llanwern, Monmouthshire. Their only child was Margaret Haig Thomas, 2nd Viscountess Rhondda, who also was a suffragette, and who inherited the viscountcy.

== Politics ==
In the 1890s Sybil Thomas became president of the Welsh Union of Women's Liberal Associations, which was strongly feminist and pro-female suffrage. She was also a prominent moderate in the National Union of Women's Suffrage Societies. Her sisters Janet and Charlotte were also prominent suffragettes and both went to prison for acts of violence in the name of the cause. Her daughter, Margaret Haig Thomas, became one of the most prominent British feminists of the inter-war years. Under their influence, Sybil joined the more militant Women's Social and Political Union. In 1914 she was sentenced to one day's imprisonment after holding a public meeting outside the Houses of Parliament.

== First World War ==
In 1916 her husband was ennobled as Baron Rhondda. During the First World War, Lady Rhondda served as chairman of the Women's Advisory Committee of the National War Savings Committee and turned part of Llanwern into a military hospital, as well as assisting her husband in his war work (as Food Controller from 1917–18).

In 1918 her husband became Viscount Rhondda. He died shortly afterwards and Lady Rhondda devoted the rest of her life to feminist and philanthropic projects.

== Honours ==
Lady Rhondda was appointed Dame Commander of the Order of the British Empire (DBE) in the 1920 civilian war honours for her work with the National War Savings Committee. She died on 11 March 1941.

== Footnotes ==
Political offices
Preceded by Sybil Smith	Honorary Treasurer of the East London Federation of Suffragettes; 1913	Succeeded by Evelina Haverfield
