= D. A. Thomas =

Welsh industrialist and politician (1856–1918)

The Right Honourable The Viscount Rhondda PC
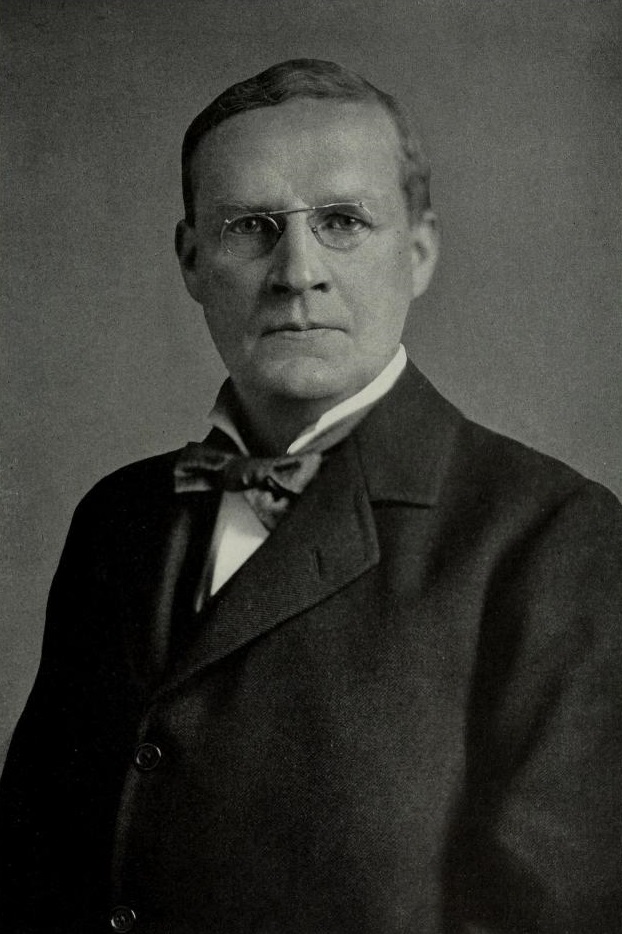

Minister of Food Control
- In office 19 June 1917 – 3 July 1918
- Monarch: George V
- Prime Minister: David Lloyd George
- Preceded by: The Lord Devonport
- Succeeded by: J. R. Clynes

Personal details
- Born: 26 March 1856 "Ysguborwen", Aberdare, Wales
- Died: 3 July 1918 (aged 62) Llanwern, Newport, Wales
- Party: Liberal
- Spouse: Sybil Haig (m. 1882)
- Children: Margaret Haig Thomas, 2nd Viscountess Rhondda

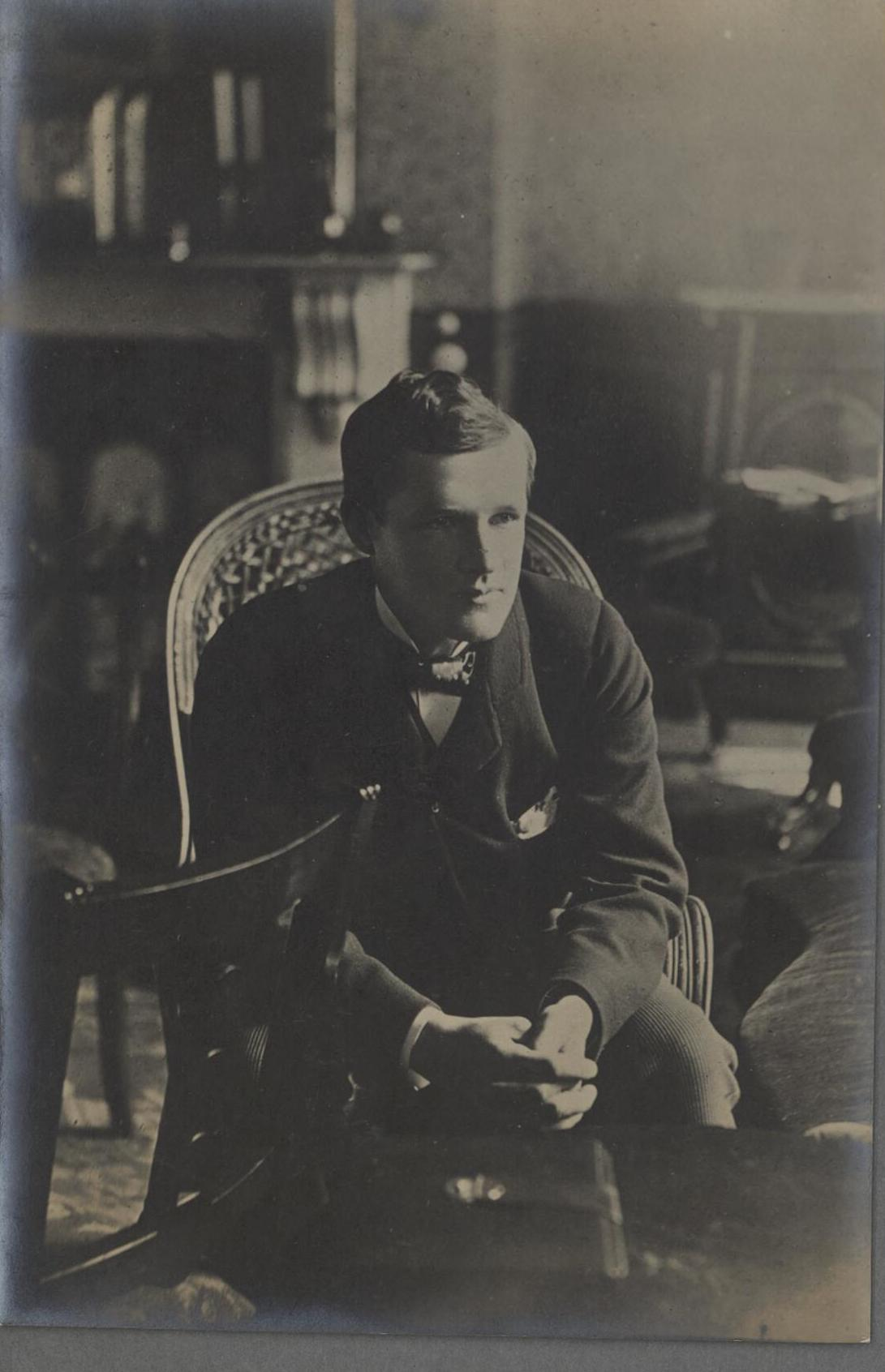
Portrait of Lord Rhondda as a youth at college (4671174)

David Alfred Thomas, 1st Viscount Rhondda, PC (26 March 1856 – 3 July 1918), was a Welsh industrialist and Liberal politician. He was Member of Parliament (MP) for Merthyr Tydfil from 1888 until the January 1910 general election, then MP for Cardiff until the December 1910 general election, when he left politics to concentrate on his business interests. He was made a member of the Privy Council in 1916. He later held office, notably as "Food Controller" in Lloyd George's wartime coalition government.

Thomas and his daughter Margaret were on the RMS Lusitania when the ship was torpedoed and sunk by a German U-Boat; both survived the disaster.

== Early life ==
The son of coal mine owner Samuel Thomas of Ysguborwen, David Thomas was a second-generation industrialist. His energy and flair for innovation swiftly led him to build a commercial empire larger than his father's. Samuel, a man not noted for a cheerful temperament, is said to have remarked on the day of his son's birth (during a thunderstorm), "Well, I see nothing for him but the workhouse."

Although tradition cited D. A. Thomas' birthplace as being an old white-walled cottage in Aberdare, this is unlikely, given that the family home, Ysguborwen (also in Aberdare), was completed in 1855. This house was built as a suitable residence for a rising industrial entrepreneur, and sets Samuel Thomas' gloomy remark in context. Samuel Thomas was one of the pioneers of the Welsh coal business.

Samuel Thomas was a hard man, perhaps the secret of his business success, and his tastes were simple. He could never forget the hardships through which he had had to pass, and as the above quotation indicates, he was unable to shake off the fear of failure. A Welsh Baptist, he managed his household according to the "Protestant work ethic". This seems to have been its own reward, for Samuel attained civic office as High Constable of Merthyr, then the roughest town in Wales.

D. A. Thomas' mother, Rachel, is described as a contrast to the sometimes miserly, always prudent Samuel. She gave young David the love that he needed, nurturing the more sensitive side that D. A. Thomas' daughter, Margaret, was to cherish.

The family home, Ysguborwen, seems to have been a fairly typical Welsh home. At first, only the Welsh language was spoken there. After all, it was the language of both of David's parents. However, Mrs. Thomas, like many Welsh parents before and since, realising that the language of the business world was English, engaged an English nurse to get her children used to speaking English. In 1859, the family moved from Calfaria Welsh Baptist Chapel to Carmel, the English Baptist Chapel opposite. English was becoming the language of the valleys, and the language of respectability. Accordingly, the upwardly mobile Thomases were going to be Anglo-Welsh.

D. A. Thomas' upbringing was stern and Victorian, teaching him discipline, mediated through love. That discipline remained with Thomas, in business and in politics. Towards the end of Thomas' life, William Brace, the Trade Union leader commented that "Rhondda has the income of a Duke and the tastes of a Peasant."

Thomas was educated at Manila Hall, Clifton, Bristol, before going up to Cambridge University Initially, Thomas was to have gone to Jesus College on a scholarship originally intended for the sons of Anglican Ministers. Since Samuel Thomas was neither an Anglican nor a minister, it would be interesting to know exactly how D. A. Thomas obtained such a scholarship. An attack of Typhoid fever, contracted in Clermont-Ferrand meant that Thomas was unable to take up the scholarship. As it was, Thomas obtained a scholarship to Gonville and Caius College, Cambridge, where he studied mathematics, and would have finished top of his year, if it had not been for his indifferent health. Even so, Thomas was in the University Rowing and Boxing teams. Thomas left Cambridge in 1880, on the death of his father.

== Personal life ==
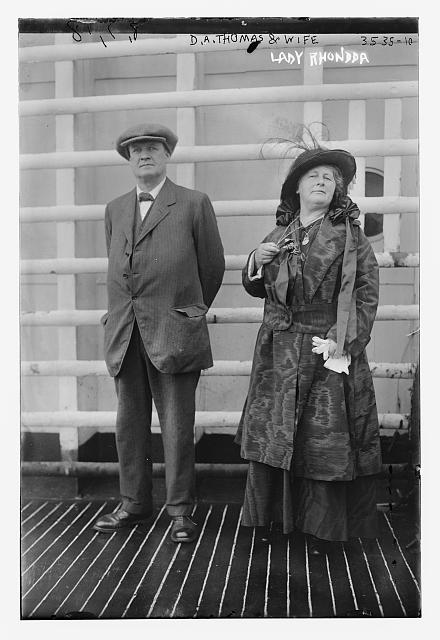
Lord and Lady Rhondda (presumed early 1900s)

In an age of religion, D. A. Thomas was that rarity, a man honestly uninterested in religion. That said, Thomas does not appear to have been an atheist, but to have found the religious sectarianism that marked the life of Wales at that time distasteful. Although brought up a Baptist (and later Congregationalist), he was received into the Anglican Church upon his marriage to Sybil Margaret Haig in 1882 and was baptised at St. Andrew's Church, near Barry. The wedding took place in a billiard-room at her parents' house. A daughter, Margaret, was born in 1883, the only issue to the couple.

Perhaps Thomas' estrangement from organised religion is due to the religious controversies of the day, or the way in which his father managed to alienate himself altogether from organised religion. After moving to Carmel English Baptist Church, Samuel Thomas appears to have become embroiled in an argument with Rev. Thomas Price, the second minister. This appears to have been over no more than personalities, for Samuel had supported the man's predecessor, and the move to Tabernacle English Congregational church ended similarly, when the minister was replaced. Samuel Thomas took it upon himself to un-church his family and conduct worship at home. Such rancour cannot have endeared organised religion to the young David.

Grigg describes Thomas' upbringing as 'Strict Congregationalist, yet D. A. Thomas was not baptised as an infant, suggesting that Samuel Thomas never abandoned his Baptist views. As a schoolboy at Bristol D. A. Thomas attended Highbury Congregational Chapel, Clifton, where his uncle, David Thomas, was minister.

Although D. A. Thomas was heavily involved in the Disestablishment controversy and was an advocate of Disestablishment, this appears to have sprung from the belief that the endowments of the church should be used for the general good He advocated the allocation of church endowments on a population basis, which alienated many of the North Wales MPs. The Rev. J. Vyrnwy Morgan, Thomas' earliest biographer writes that: '...religion was a subject concerning which he spoke less than he thought.'

Despite attacks of rheumatic fever, which plagued him for much of his life, D. A. Thomas was no shrinking violet. At college, he rowed and boxed enthusiastically, and his obituary in the South Wales Daily News spoke of him being seldom happier than 'when romping with children.' In 1881, D. A. Thomas rescued a boy who fell through the ice on Hirwaun Pond, Aberdare, an act for which he received an award from the Humane Society. In this, and in his later survival of the wreck of the Lusitania, D. A. Thomas' prowess in swimming, another college sport in which he excelled, holding a medal in the long-dive, stood him in good stead.

== Early career ==
Thomas joined Osborn Henry Riches in the sales department of the Cambrian Collieries, later moving to Clydach Vale to learn the management of the mines themselves. In the course of this work, which went on for more than a year, he descended the pit with the workers and remained underground until four in the afternoon.

David Alfred Thomas moved to London in 1882, where he worked in a Stockbroker's Office in Cornhill. There he had an attack of rheumatic fever, a complaint which had plagued him since his youth. After the death of Mr. Riches, he returned to Cardiff to manage the Cambrian Collieries.

== Business interests ==
Not long after inheriting his father's business, Thomas assessed the state of the company. To expand the business, D. A. Thomas converted the company from private ownership into a limited liability company, securing the capital to expand operations. The sale of shares was not a means for the heir to become an idler, for D. A. Thomas continued to take an active part in the management for the company. In the great coal strike of 1898, D. A. Thomas refused to take the side of the coal-owners' organisation. The Cambrian Collieries continued to work through the strike, an action that made a great deal for the collieries' shareholders. In 1910, D. A. Thomas was involved in a coal strike begun at the Ely Pit in Penygraig, an action that infuriated him. He saw the strike as a betrayal, and his actions at attempting to break the strike turned into one of the most important and violent events in Rhondda history, the Tonypandy riots. From 1901 to 1906, ill-health forced Thomas to take a break from his business activities. He became director of the company that acquired The Cambrian News newspaper in 1915.

== Llanwern ==
In 1887, a year before his election to Parliament, Thomas took the lease of Llanwern House, at Llanwern, just outside Newport, Monmouthshire, where he lived the life of a somewhat unconventional country squire, riding to hounds and breeding prize Hereford cattle. He bought the house in 1900 and acquired the neighbouring Pencoed estate shortly before his death, with the intention of presenting Pencoed Castle to his daughter, Margaret. Despite his fearsome reputation as an industrialist, Thomas appears to have been a genuinely well-loved landowner, the tenants of Pencoed actively lobbying him to buy the estate. This purchase left Thomas the largest landowner in Monmouthshire after Lord Tredegar.

Despite his fortune, Thomas was quite content to retain the mansion at Llanwern, a large square house on a hilltop overlooking the village of Llanwern. The house, dating to 1760, was old-fashioned in its appearance with an interior decorated in a Chinese-influenced style.

== Political career ==
David Thomas c1895

D. A. Thomas was elected MP for Merthyr Tydfil at a by-election in 1888, and represented the seat until he stepped down to fight the marginal seat of Cardiff in January 1910. Thomas consistently topped the poll, not even Keir Hardie was able to topple him from his perch. Although an employer, he was felt to be a fair man, and was genuinely respected by the voters of Merthyr.

He was an early supporter of the Cymru Fydd movement, but opposed its integration with the South Wales Liberal Federation, thus making an enemy of David Lloyd George, being largely responsible for that movement's demise. As President of the South Wales Liberal Federation from 1894 to 1897, Thomas believed that the southern counties of Glamorgan and Monmouthshire, which together contained over half the Welsh population, would suffer under the proposed scheme for a single national federation. He held similar views on the disestablishment of the Church in Wales, believing that the revenues wrested from the church should be distributed to the counties on the basis of population. With David Lloyd George, Francis Edwards and Herbert Lewis, Thomas revolted against the Rosebery Government's perceived downgrading of Disestablishment in 1894. In 1900 he proposed a motion calling for a full inquiry into the Jameson Raid, claiming that the earlier Committee of Inquiry had access to all relevant material and that newspaper disclosures had impugned its impartiality.

D. A. Thomas was much disappointed when he was not offered Government office after the Liberal election victory of 1906. Unlike Herbert Lewis and Lloyd George, more had been expected from Thomas in 1894, and his actions in joining the revolt had not endeared him to the Liberal leadership. Thomas became increasingly disillusioned with politics, and left parliament at the December 1910 General Election, apparently a political failure. Certainly, his early promise had not been vindicated. In many ways Thomas was not suited to party politics and he was described by Stuart Rendel as 'a Tory in disguise. His greatest political success came later, during the wartime coalition (see below).

== "Coal King" ==
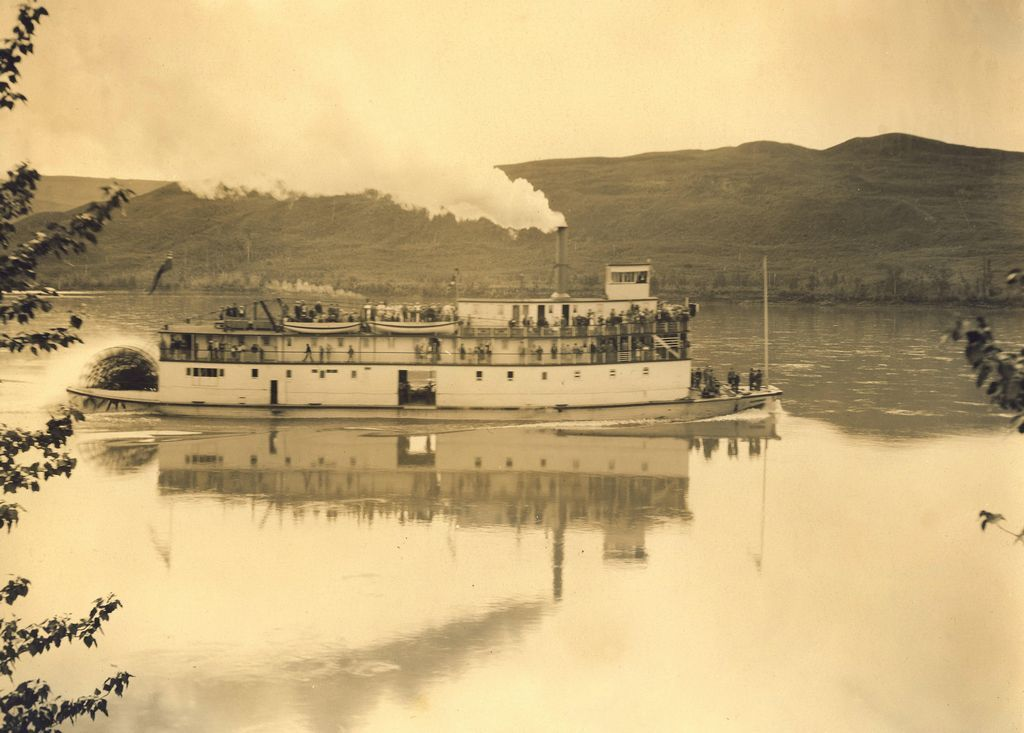
The D.A. Thomas, the largest vessel on the Peace River, was built to exploit Thomas's investment in the coalfields on northern Alberta's Peace River.

After D. A. Thomas' expectations of high office were disappointed following the 1906 General Election he concentrated once more on business. In 1908 the Cambrian Combine was formed, with the merger of the Glamorgan, the Naval and the Britannic Merthyr collieries with the Cambrian Collieries. This great industrial combine would later take in further collieries. As Thomas came to realise that the golden age of the Welsh coal trade would not continue. Thomas sought to organise the Welsh coal trade to prevent destructive competition.

In the pre-war years Thomas acquired tracts of coal-bearing land in North America which was not fully developed.

He was awarded the Guy Medal in 1904 from the Royal Statistical Society for The Growth and Direction of our Foreign Trade in Coal (1850–1900) written in 1903.

== First World War ==
Having made a fortune as owner of the Cambrian Collieries, he would return to politics as David Lloyd George's emissary to the United States, for which purpose he was created Baron Rhondda in 1916 and later Viscount Rhondda in 1918.

In May 1915 he was on the RMS Lusitania when she was torpedoed. He and his daughter, Margaret, were among the survivors. A humorous story, remembered by his daughter, was that the local (Cardiff) Evening Express newspaper displayed a poster about the sinking that read "Great National Disaster. D. A. Saved". The somewhat equivocal compliment amused D. A. Thomas immensely.

Clement Edwards, MP, related the story of an aged collier who, on being informed that Thomas had been in the ship when it had gone down, declared, "I will wait till tomorrow. He always comes out on top, and I promise you this: he will come to the top of the water again with a big fish in each of his hands."

In 1916, he became President of the Local Government Board. As Minister of Food Control during the latter part of the First World War, he was very successful, introducing an efficient system of rationing.

== Last years ==
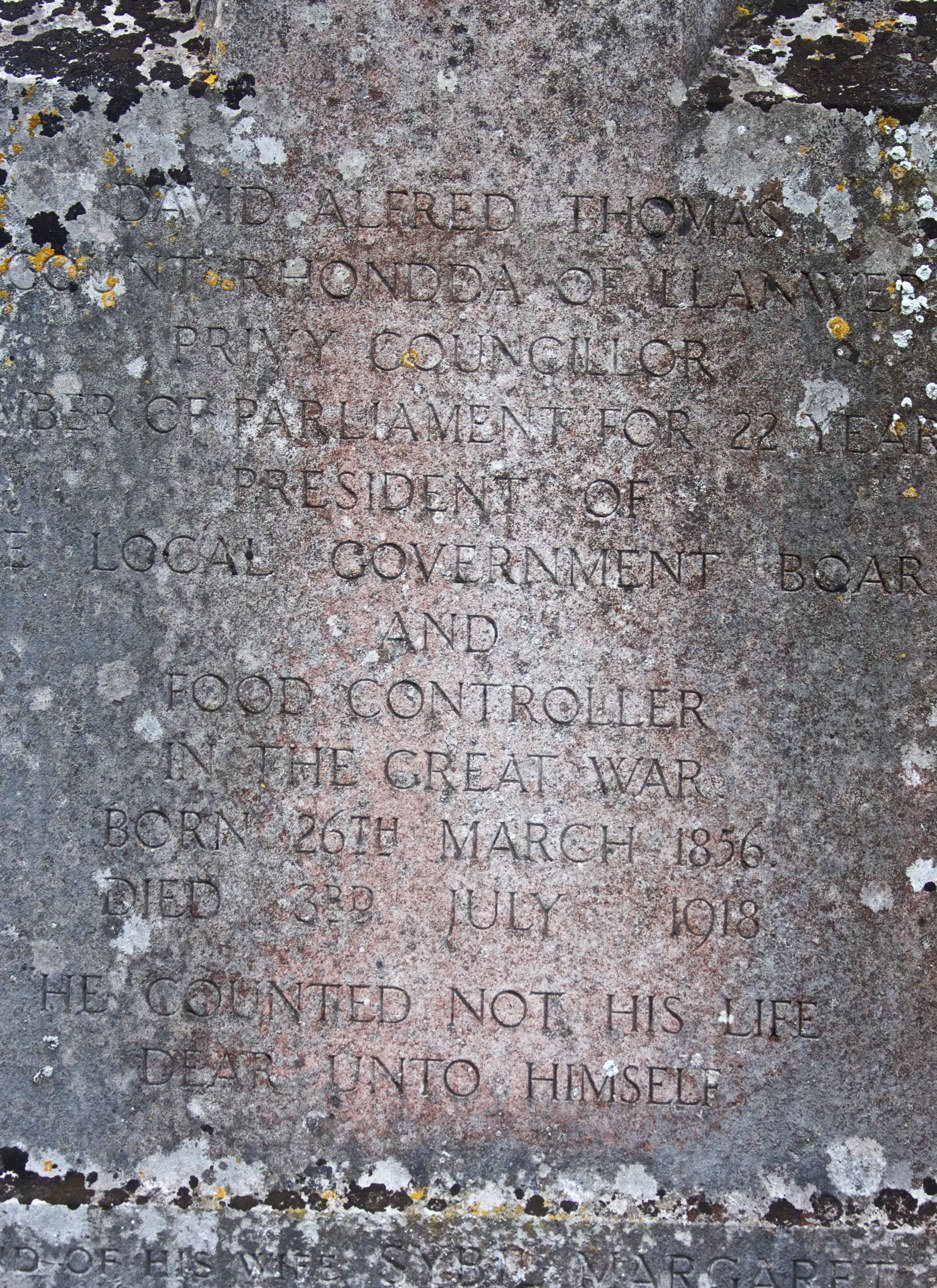
Thomas memorial at St Mary's Church, Llanwern

The work took a terrible toll on his constitution, however, and he died at Llanwern on the morning of Wednesday, 3 July 1918, aged 62. He was cremated at Golders Green Crematorium in London, but his ashes were returned to St Mary's Church, Llanwern, where they lie alongside the bodies of previous squires of Llanwern (although D. A. Thomas' monument is by far the largest – "on a recent visit to Llanwern, it took me two circuits of the churchyard to find the tomb, since I had initially mistaken it for the War memorial", in the words of one D. A. Thomas Scholar), his wife and daughter. His epitaph reads, 'He counted his life not dear to himself.'

While the Rhondda Barony died with him, the title of Viscount Rhondda passed to his daughter Margaret by special remainder, something Thomas had insisted on when he was offered the honour. Following his death, and with the recent passage of the Sex Disqualification (Removal) Act 1919, she attempted to take his seat in the House of Lords. After initially being accepted, the relevant committee's membership was altered and her request was rejected.

Thomas's widow, Sybil, Viscountess Rhondda (1857–1941) was created a Dame Commander of the Order of the British Empire in 1920.

== Legacy ==
Thomas had extensive investments in the coalfields on the Peace River, in remote northern Alberta, Canada. He commissioned what was to be the largest riverboat on the Peace River, which was named D.A. Thomas in his honour.

== Sources ==
- J. Vyrnwy Morgan: Life of Viscount Rhondda (London, 1919)
- Margaret Rhondda (ed.): D. A. Thomas: Viscount Rhondda (London, 1921)
- Margaret Rhondda: This Was My World (London, 1933)
- 'A Gentleman with a Duster': The Mirrors of Downing Street (London, 1922)
- John Grigg: Lloyd George: War Leader (London, 2002)
- Tony Judge, J. R. Clynes: A Political Life (London, 2016)
- Kenneth O. Morgan, 'D. A. Thomas: The Industrialist as Politician' in Modern Wales: Politics Places and People (Cardiff 1995)
- Thomas Lloyd: Lost Houses of Wales (London, 1987)
- Gerard Charmley: 'D. A. Thomas Versus Lloyd George' (unpublished Cardiff University M.A. Thesis)
- D. A. Thomas Memorial, churchyard of St. Mary's Church, Llanwern
- National Library of Wales, D. A. Thomas Papers
- National Library of Wales, Herbert Lewis Papers
- National Library of Wales, William George Papers
- National Library of Wales, Lloyd George Papers
- South Wales Daily News
- Western Mail

== Bibliography ==
- Morgan, Kenneth O. (1960). "Democratic Politics in Glamorgan, 1884–1914". Morgannwg. 4: 5–27.

Parliament of the United Kingdom
| Preceded by Henry Richard; Charles James | Member of Parliament for Merthyr Tydfil; 1888 – January 1910; Served alongside: Henry Richard, 1888; William Pritchard Morgan, 1888–1900; Keir Hardie, 1900–1910 | Succeeded by Keir Hardie; Edgar Jones |
| Preceded by Ivor Guest | Member of Parliament for Cardiff; January 1910 – December 1910 | Succeeded by Lord Ninian Crichton-Stuart |
Political offices
| Preceded by The Lord Devonport | Minister of Food Control; 1917–1918 | Succeeded by John Robert Clynes |
Peerage of the United Kingdom
| New creation | Viscount Rhondda; 1918 | Succeeded by Margaret Haig Thomas |
| New creation | Baron Rhondda; 1916–1918 | Extinct |
