= Viscount Rhondda =

Title in the Peerage of the United Kingdom

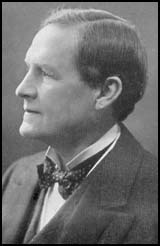
D. A. Thomas, 1st Viscount Rhondda.

Viscount Rhondda, of Llanwern in the County of Monmouth, was a title in the Peerage of the United Kingdom. It was created on 19 June 1918 for the Welsh businessman and Liberal politician David Alfred Thomas, 1st Baron Rhondda, with special remainder to his daughter Margaret and her heirs male. Thomas had already been created Baron Rhondda, of Llanwern in the County of Monmouth, on 28 January 1916, with normal remainder to the heirs male of his body. The barony became extinct on his death in 1918, whereas he was succeeded in the viscountcy according to the special remainder by his daughter Margaret. She was a well-known suffragette. On her death in 1958 this title became extinct as well.

== Viscounts Rhondda (1918) ==
- David Alfred Thomas, 1st Viscount Rhondda (1856–1918)
- Margaret Haig Thomas, 2nd Viscountess Rhondda (1883–1958)
