= Sir Thomas Mackworth, 4th Baronet =

British landowner and politician

Sir Thomas Mackworth, 4th Baronet (died 1745) of Normanton Hall, Rutland, was a British landowner and politician who sat in the English House of Commons between 1694 and 1707 and in the British House of Commons in 1707 to 1708 and between 1713 and 1727. He was a speculator in mining.

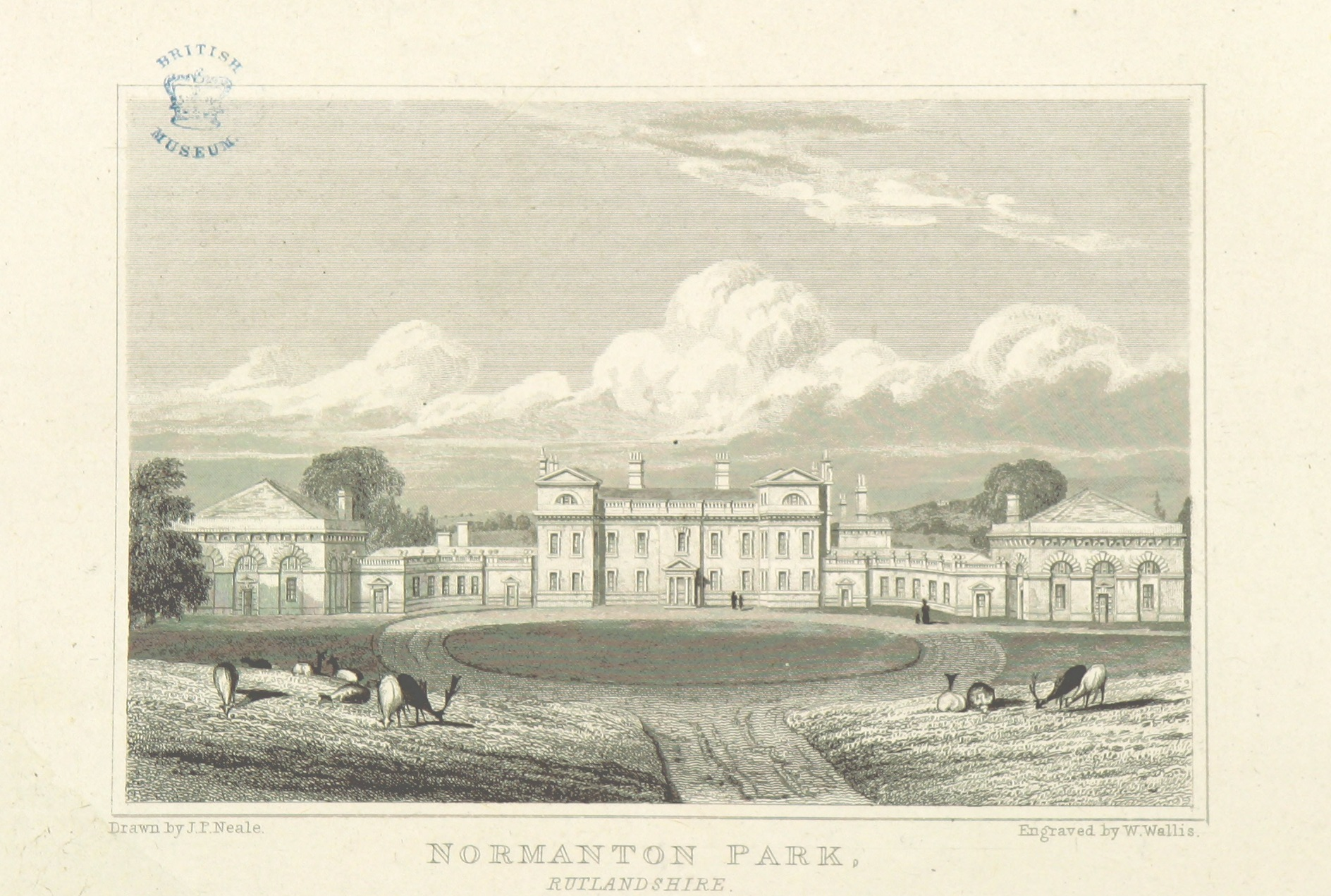
Normanton Hall, Rutland - the Mackworth family seat

== Biography ==
Mackworth was the only surviving son of Sir Thomas Mackworth, 3rd Baronet and his second wife, Anne Mackworth, daughter of Col. Humphrey Mackworth, of Betton, Shropshire. His father died in November 1694 and he succeeded to his estates, his seat in Parliament and the baronetcy.

Mackworth was returned unopposed as Member of Parliament for Rutland at a by-election on 17 December 1694 following the death of his father. He did not stand for election in 1695 but was High Sheriff of Rutland for the year 1696 to 1697. At the first general election in 1701, Mackworth was returned unopposed as MP for Rutland and was returned again in the second general election of 1701, 1702 and 1705. He did not stand in the general elections in 1708 and 1710.

He became involved with his cousin Sir Humphrey Mackworth in mining and smelting ventures in south Wales and acted as a partner when Sir Humphrey bought some lead mines formerly owned by Sir Carbery Pryse, 4th Baronet. When the Company of Mine Adventurers was floated in 1698. He was a director of the company from the outset.

In 1704, the Company of Mine Adventurers received a Royal Charter, but by 1710 was running into financial difficulties which resulted in a parliamentary enquiry. Mackworth pleaded lack of financial expertise and lack of involvement in the decisions that led to failure, but was debarred from being a Director of the Company.

At the 1713 general election he was returned on behalf of the administration as MP for Portsmouth, but did not stand for Parliament in 1715. It was said in 1716 that he had profited greatly by shrewd investments at the time of the Jacobite rebellion. He invested further in the Company of Mine Adventurers, of which he became a Director again in 1721. He was returned unopposed for Rutland as a Tory at a by-election on 5 April 1721 and headed the poll in 1722.

However, he was ruined financially by the cost of this contest and his estates including Normanton Hall were sold by order of the court of Chancery to pay his debts, He did not stand at the 1727 general election. On a visit to Paris in 1729 he expressed strong pro-Jacobite sentiments.

== Private life ==
Mackworth died unmarried at Kentish Town in North London in February 1745, leaving most of his property to his sisters, and the baronetcy passed to a cousin, Thomas Mackworth, an apothecary in Huntingdon. He also left some property in trust for a supposed illegitimate son, Thomas Mackworth.

Parliament of England
Preceded by Bennet Sherard; Sir Thomas Mackworth	Member of Parliament for Rutland; 1694–1695; With: Bennet Sherard	Succeeded by Bennet Sherard; Lord Burghley
Preceded by Richard Halford; Lord Burghley	Member of Parliament for Rutland; 1701–1708; With: Richard Halford	Succeeded by Richard Halford; Philip Sherard
Parliament of Great Britain
Preceded by Admiral Sir James Wishart; Sir William Gifford	Member of Parliament for Portsmouth; 1713–1715; With: Admiral Sir James Wishart	Succeeded by Sir Charles Wager; Sir Edward Ernle, Bt
Preceded by Lord Finch; Marquess of Granby	Member of Parliament for Rutland; 1721–1727; With: Lord Finch	Succeeded by Lord Finch; John Noel
Baronetage of England
Preceded by Thomas Mackworth	Baronet (of Normanton); 1694-1745	Succeeded by Thomas Mackworth
