= Llanwern =

Village and community in Wales

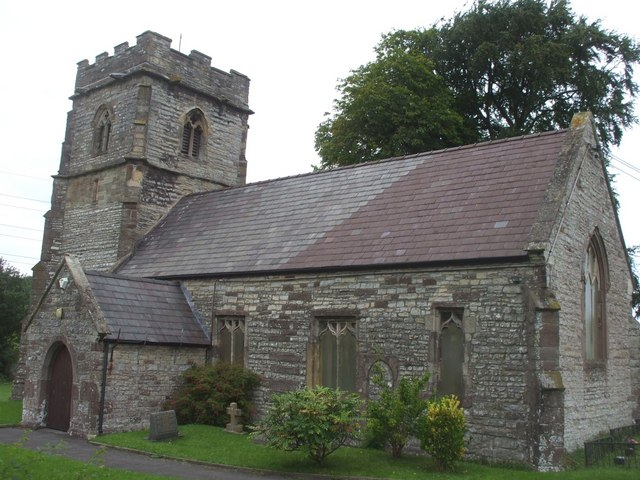
- St Mary's Church

- Location within Newport
- Population: 2,961 (2011 census)
- OS grid reference: ST368863
- Principal area: Newport
- Country: Wales
- Sovereign state: United Kingdom
- Post town: NEWPORT
- Postcode district: NP18, NP19
- Dialling code: 01633
- Police: Gwent
- Fire: South Wales
- Ambulance: Welsh
- UK Parliament: Newport East
- Senedd Cymru – Welsh Parliament: Newport East
- List of places UK Wales Newport 51.57201°N 2.91331°W Map of the community

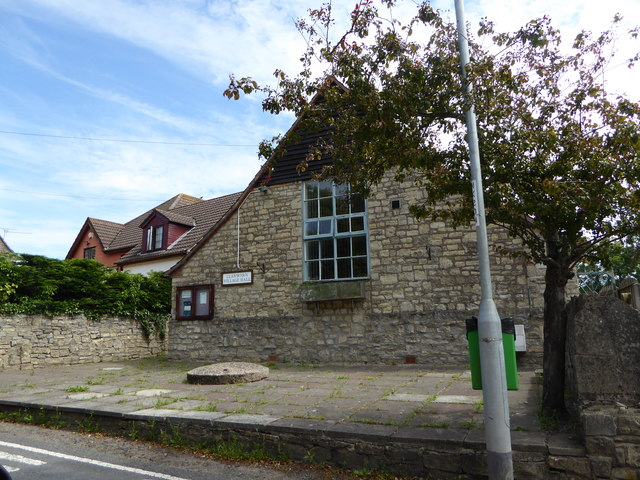
Llanwern village hall

Llanwern is a village and community in the eastern part of the city of Newport, South East Wales. The name may be translated as "the church among the grove of the alders".

== Location and populace ==
Llanwern is bounded by the M4 and Langstone to the north, by Ringland and Lliswerry to the west, by Nash, Goldcliff and Whitson to the south and by the city boundary to the east. The population of the Llanwern community in 2011 was 333, which contains Llanwern village and the western half of the site of Llanwern steelworks. The community population dropped to 289 in 2011. The community also includes the area of Glan Llyn.

== Notable features ==
=== Church of St Mary ===
The church is dedicated to St Mary and is a Grade II* listed building and dates from the 14th century.

The church has a particularly good collection of stained glass. The west tower, stylistically more elaborate than most local churches, contains five bells of various dates. The bells were restored in the 1990s.

=== Llanwern House ===
Llanwern House was the home of David Alfred Thomas, 1st Viscount Rhondda (1856–1918), who was Minister of Food during the First World War. In 1887, a year before his election to Parliament, Thomas took the lease of the house, where he lived the life of a country squire, riding to hounds and breeding prize Hereford cattle. He bought the house in 1900 and acquired the neighbouring Pencoed estate shortly before his death, the purchase making Thomas the largest landowner in Monmouthshire after Lord Tredegar. Despite his fortune Thomas was content to retain the mansion at Llanwern, a large square house on a hilltop overlooking the village. The house, dating to 1760, was old-fashioned in its appearance but that appearance concealed a "delicate and beautiful interior" with Chinoiserie influences. The house was demolished in the 1950s, although the site is still visible, and the parkland intact. Thomas's ashes are interred in the family graveyard in the church.

== Governance ==
Llanwern has a community council, represented by up to seven community councillors.

Llanwern is covered by a Newport City Council electoral ward, also called Llanwern, though also including Goldcliff, Nash, Whitson and Redwick, as well as the community of Llanwern. It elects one city councillor. Since 2008 this has been Conservative Martyn Kellway.

== Regeneration ==
A £115m renewal project called Glan Llyn, led by St. Modwen Properties Limited, is transforming the former steel-producing part of the Llanwern steelworks site. Started in 2004, the masterplan envisages 34 acres (14 ha) of employment-generating accommodation hosting 6,000 jobs, 4,000 new dwellings, community facilities and open space including three new lakes. Completion is anticipated by 2026–2028.

== See also ==
- Llanwern A.F.C.
- Llanwern High School
