= Mackworth baronets =

Set index for Mackworth baronets

There have been two baronetcies created for persons with the surname Mackworth, one in the Baronetage of England and one in the Baronetage of Great Britain. As of 2026 one creation is extant.

- Mackworth baronets of Normanton (1619)
- Mackworth baronets of The Gnoll (1776)

== See also ==
- Mackworth-Praed baronets
