= William Sherard, 1st Baron Sherard =

English official (1588–1640)

The Right Honourable The Lord Sherard

Personal details
- Born: William Sherard; 1 August 1588 Stapleford, Leicestershire
- Died: 16 April 1640 (aged 51)
- Spouse: Abigail Cave Tresham
- Relations: Bennet Sherard, 1st Earl of Harborough (grandson); Bennet Sherard (grandson)
- Children: 11, including Bennet, Philip
- Parent(s): Francis Sherard; Anne Moore

William Sherard, 1st Baron Sherard of Leitrim (1 August 1588 – 16 April 1640) was an English official who was created Baron Sherard in the peerage of Ireland by King Charles I in 1627.

== Early life ==
Sherard was born on 1 August 1588 in Stapleford, Leicestershire, England. He was a son of Francis Sherard (d. 1594), who succeeded to the Sherard family estates, and the former Anne Moore (daughter of George Moore of Bourne, Lincolnshire). He had two brothers, who both died without issue, and a sister, Rose, who married John Sherard of Lobthorpe.

The Sherard family had a proud Parliamentary tradition and had first represented Leicestershire in 1491. Through his paternal grandfather, George Sherard, who was Sheriff of Rutland around 1567 (and married Rose Poulteney, daughter of Sir Thomas Poulteney), he was a great-grandson of Thomas Sherard, who was Sheriff of Rutland around 1495 and 1506 (the elder son of Geoffrey Sherard of Stapleford, Sheriff of Rutland in 1468, 1480 and 1484).

== Career ==
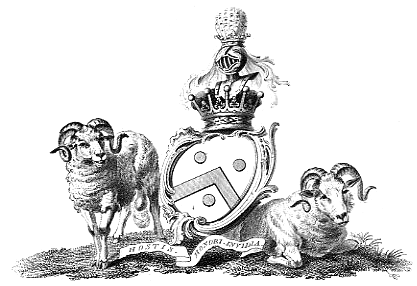
Arms of Sherard: Argent, a chevron gules between three torteaux

Sherard was a member of the Honourable Band of Gentlemen Pensioners under King James I.

On 3 July 1622, he received the honour of knighthood from King James I at Oatlands Palace. On 10 July 1627, he was created Lord Sherard, Baron of Leitrim, in the Peerage of Ireland, by James' successor, King Charles I.

In 1635–36, he brought a case against Sir Henry Mynne of Whissendine to the court of Star Chamber, complaining that Mynne had insulted him. The case was finally settled in 1638–39, with Mynne paying a fine and making an apology.

== Personal life ==
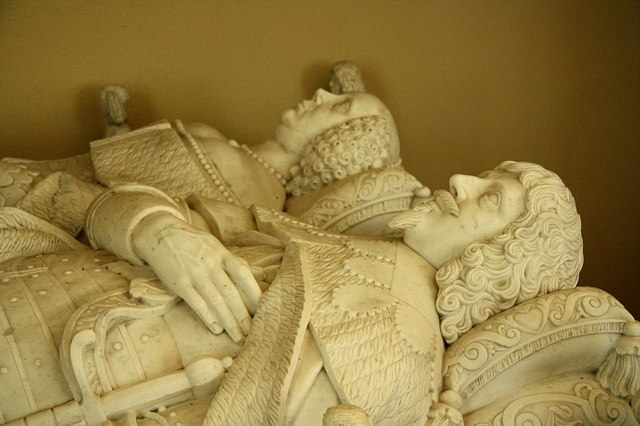
Lord Sherard and his wife, Abigail at Stapleford church

Lord Sherard was married to Abigail (née Cave) Tresham (1593–1659), widow of Henry Tresham of Newton, eldest daughter and co-heiress of Anne (née Bennett) Cave (daughter of sole heir of Anthony Bennett of Greenwich) and Cecil Cave of Stanford (third son of Roger Cave). Together, they were the parents of seven sons (four of whom died without unmarried) and four daughters (three of whom died unmarried):

- Bennet Sherard, 2nd Baron Sherard (1621–1700), an MP for Leicestershire who served as Lord Lieutenant of Rutland.
- Hon. Philip Sherard (1623–1695), an MP for Rutland who married Margaret Eure, widow of both John Pulteney and Col. Hon. William Eure (son of Lord Eure), and daughter of Sir Thomas Denton of Hillesden.
- Hon. George Sherard (1626–1670), who married Anne Crockenbury (d. 1669), daughter of London merchant.
- Hon. Abigail Sherard (c. 1633–1680), who married Nicholas Knollys, titular 3rd Earl of Banbury of Great Harrowden, widower of Lady Isabella Blount (eldest daughter of Mountjoy Blount, 1st Earl of Newport), and a son of William Knollys, 1st Earl of Banbury.

Lord Sherard died on 16 April 1640 and was buried near his father at Stapleford. He was succeeded by his eldest son, the second Baron.

=== Descendants ===
Through his eldest surviving son Bennet, he was a grandfather of Bennet Sherard, 1st Earl of Harborough and Hon. Lucy Sherard, who married John Manners, 2nd Duke of Rutland. Through his granddaughter Lucy, Duchess of Rutland, he was the ancestor of Lord Sherard Manners, MP for Tavistock, Lady Caroline Manners (wife of Sir Henry Harpur, 5th Baronet and, secondly, Sir Robert Burdett, 4th Baronet), Lady Lucy Manners (wife of William Graham, 2nd Duke of Montrose), Lord Robert Manners, and Lord Charles Manners, among others.

Through his son Philip of Whissendine, he was a grandfather of Bennet Sherard, himself the father of Philip Sherard, 2nd Earl of Harborough, who inherited the Harborough earldom from his first cousin once removed through special remainder, and Margaret Sherard, the wife of The Most Rev. John Gilbert, Archbishop of York.

Through his son George, he was a grandfather of William Sherard, who married the daughter and heir of Castell Sherard, of Glatton and Folksworth. George's great-great-great-grandson, Philip Castel Sherard (1804–1886), became the ninth Baron Sherard upon the death of Robert Sherard, 6th Earl of Harborough (the grandson of Robert Sherard, 4th Earl of Harborough) (Note: Robert Sherard, 6th Earl of Harborough was the natural father of Rev. Bennet Sherard Calcraft Kennedy by the actress Emma Love. The Rev. Kennedy and Jane Stanley Wordsworth (a granddaughter of the poet William Wordsworth) were the parents of British author and journalist Robert Sherard (1861–1943), who was a friend, and the first biographer, of Oscar Wilde.) in 1859.

Peerage of Ireland
New creation	Baron Sherard; 1627–1640	Succeeded by Bennet Sherard
