= Baron Sherard =

Title in the Peerage of Ireland

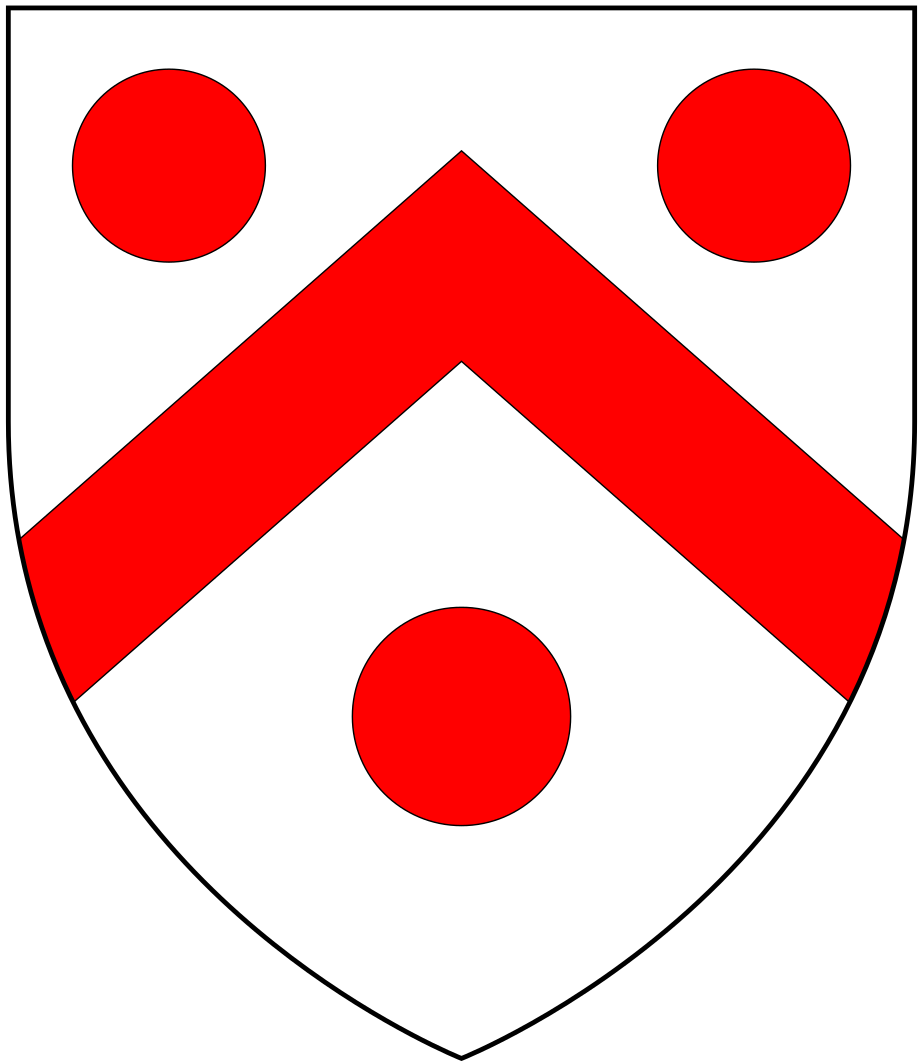
Arms of Sherard: Argent, a chevron gules between three torteaux

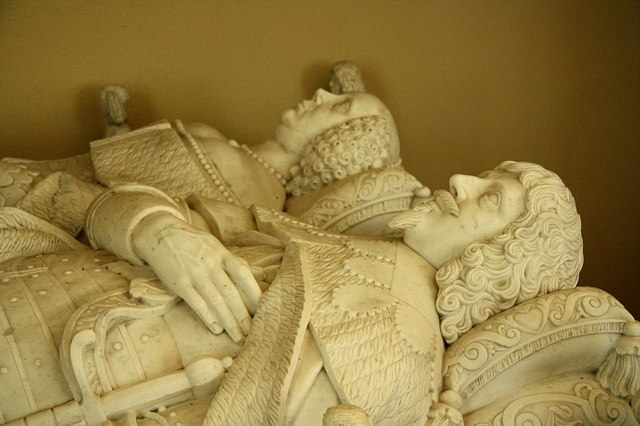
The first Baron Sherard and his wife Lady Abigail. Stapleford church.

Lord Sherard, Baron of Leitrim, was a title in the Peerage of Ireland in 1627. The third holder of the barony would also be named Baron Harborough (1714), Viscount Sherard (1718), and Earl of Harborough (1719), with the viscountcy ending with the death of its original holder in 1732, but the other titles persisting in the family until 1859. The Sherard barony became dormant in 1931 with the death of the last known male-line family member. Many descendants of the Sherard noble family are still living today, with the youngest being born in August of 2007.

== History ==
The Sherard family descended from Geoffrey Sherard, of Stapleford, Leicestershire, High Sheriff of Rutland in 1468, 1480 and 1484. His son Thomas Sherard was High Sheriff of Rutland in circa 1495 and circa 1506, while in the next generation George Sherard was High Sheriff of Rutland in circa 1567. It was the grandson of this last, Sir William Sherard, of Stapleford, Leicestershire, who was elevated to the peerage in 1627. His eldest son, Bennet Sherard, who would succeed him as the 2nd Baron, sat as Member of Parliament for Leicestershire and served as Lord Lieutenant of Rutland, while a younger son, Philip Sherard, sat as Member of Parliament for Rutland.

Bennet Sherard, 3rd Baron Sherard, succeeded his father the 2nd Baron, representing both Leicestershire and Rutland in Parliament and served as Lord Lieutenant of Rutland. In 1714 he was created Baron Harborough, of Harborough in the County of Leicester, with remainder to his first cousin once removed, Philip Sherard (son of Bennet Sherard, in turn son of the 1st Baron's younger son, Philip Sherard, MP). In 1718 he was made Viscount Sherard, of Stapleford in the County of Leicester, with normal remainder to the heirs male of his body, and was further honoured in 1719 when he was made Earl of Harborough, with similar remainder as for the barony of Harborough. All three titles were in the Peerage of Great Britain. Lord Harborough was childless and the viscountcy consequently became extinct on his death in 1732. He was succeeded in the other titles by his aforementioned cousin.

Philip Sherard, 2nd Earl and Baron Harborough, and 4th Baron Sherard, had previously represented Rutland in Parliament and also served as Lord-Lieutenant of Rutland. Two of his sons, Bennet, the 3rd Earl, and Robert, the 4th, also succeeded in turn to the Sherard barony, while a younger son, Philip(died 1790), was a Lieutenant-General in the British Army. Robert was succeeded by his son Philip and grandson Robert Sherard, the 6th and last Earl of Harborough, and 8th Baron Sherard.

Robert was the father of three illegitimate sons by the actress and opera singer Emma Sarah Love Calcraft Kennedy (1801–1881) wife to Captain Granby Hales Calcraft (1802–1856). These included artist Edward Sherard Calcraft Kennedy (1833–1900) and Reverend Bennet Sherard Calcraft Kennedy, who was husband to William Wordsworth's granddaughter Jane and father of author and journalist Robert Harborough Sherard the first biographer of Oscar Wilde. Although marrying Mary Eliza Temple (born 1818) in 1843 he died without legitimate issue and the Earldom and Harborough barony went extinct.

The right to the Sherard barony is thought to have passed to a distant cousin, descended from the third son of the 1st Baron, though the heirs of that line never attempted to sit and thus the priority of their claim was never recorded or tested before the House of Lords prior to being rendered moot by the extinction of the male line in 1931.

The cousin, Philip Castel Sherard, 9th Baron, died childless, and was succeeded in turn by the sons of his brother, Reverend Simon Haughton Sherard: Castel Sherard, 10th Baron, who was a Commander in the Royal Navy dying in 1902, and Philip Halton Sherard, 11th Baron Sherard, who died childless in 1924. The succession then fell to a second cousin, Robert Castel Sherard, a descendant of the 9th Baron's grandfather, and when the latter died childless in 1931, the title became dormant .

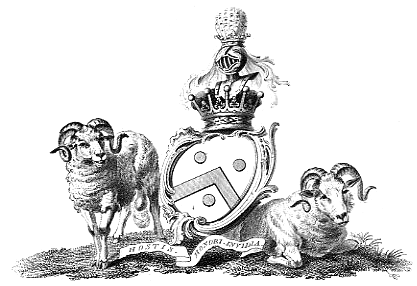
Arms of Sherard

== Barons Sherard (1627) ==
- William Sherard, 1st Baron Sherard (1588–1640)
- Bennet Sherard, 2nd Baron Sherard (1621–1700)
- Bennet Sherard, 1st Earl of Harborough, Viscount Sherard, and Baron Harborough, 3rd Baron Sherard (1675–1732)
- Philip Sherard, 2nd Earl of Harborough and Baron Harborough, 4th Baron Sherard (1680–1750)
- Bennet Sherard, 3rd Earl of Harborough and Baron Harborough, 5th Baron Sherard (1709–1770)
- Robert Sherard, 4th Earl of Harborough and Baron Harborough, 6th Baron Sherard (1719–1799)
- Philip Sherard, 5th Earl of Harborough and Baron Harborough, 7th Baron Sherard (1767–1807)
- Robert Sherard, 6th Earl of Harborough and Baron Harborough, 8th Baron Sherard (1797–1859)
- Philip Castell Sherard, 9th Baron Sherard (1804–1886)
- Castell Sherard, 10th Baron Sherard (1849–1902)
- Philip Halton Sherard, 11th Baron Sherard (1851–1924)
- Robert Castell Sherard, 12th Baron Sherard (1858–1931)

=== Line of Descent ===
- William Sherard, 1st Baron Sherard (1588–1640)
  - Bennet Sherard, 2nd Baron Sherard (1621–1700)
    - Bennet Sherard, 1st Earl of Harborough (1675–1732)
  - Philip Sherard (1623–1695)
    - Bennet Sherard (1649–1701)
      - Philip Sherard, 2nd Earl of Harborough (c. 1680–1750)
        - Bennet Sherard, 3rd Earl of Harborough (1709–1770)
        - Robert Sherard, 4th Earl of Harborough (1719–1799)
          - Philip Sherard, 5th Earl of Harborough (1767–1807)
            - Robert Sherard, 6th Earl of Harborough (1797–1859) (Note: Robert Sherard, 6th Earl of Harborough had three illegitimate sons, including the Rev. Bennet Sherard Calcraft Kennedy (1832–1886), who married Jane Stanley Wordsworth, a granddaughter of the poet William Wordsworth. Their son was author and journalist Robert Harborough Sherard. Another of the 6th Earls sons was Edward Sherard Calcraft Kennedy (1837–1900), an artist who married Emily Paul in 1857 and, after their divorce, Florence Elizabeth Laing, a daughter of Samuel Laing.)
        - Philip Sherard (1726/7–1790)
  - George Sherard (1626–1670)
    - William Sherard (b. 1652)
      - Castel Sherard (1695–1741)
        - Castel Sherard (1733–1803)
          - Philip Castel Sherard (1767–1814)
            - Philip Castel Sherard, 9th Baron Sherard (1804–1896)
            - Haughton James Sherard (1809–1809)
              - Castel Sherard, 10th Baron Sherard (1849–1902)
              - Philip Halton Sherard, 11th Baron Sherard (1851–1924)
            - Simon Haughton Sherard (1811–1882)
            - George Sherard (1812–1857)
          - Robert Sherard (1777–1835)
            - Charles Wale Sherard (1820–1889)
              - Robert Castel Sherard, 12th Baron Sherard (1858–1931)

== See also ==
- Burke's Peerage
