= Robert Sherard (disambiguation) =

Robert Sherard was a writer.

Robert Sherard may also refer to:

- Robert Sherard (MP) for Leicestershire (UK Parliament constituency)
- Robert Sherard, 4th Earl of Harborough (1719–1799)
- Robert Sherard, 6th Earl of Harborough (1797–1859)
- Robert Castell Sherard, 12th Baron Sherard (1858–1931)
