= Stapleford Park =

Country house in Leicestershire, England

Coordinates: 52.7540°N 0.7958°W

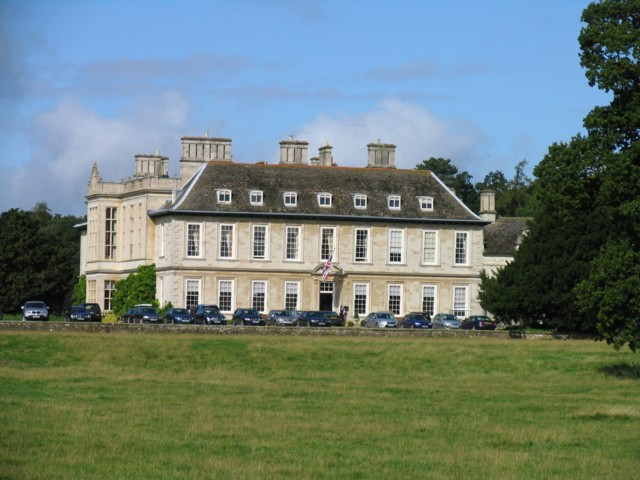
Stapleford Park Hotel

Stapleford Park is a Grade I listed country house in Stapleford, near Melton Mowbray in Leicestershire, England, which is now used as a hotel. It was originally the seat of the Sherard and Tamblyn families, later the Earls of Harborough and, from 1894, of the Gretton family, who would become the Barons Gretton.

== House ==
The house has developed to its present form in stages. The north wing was originally built for Thomas Sherard c.1500 and remodelled in 1633 by William and Abigail Sherard. The main H-plan range was built for Bennet Sherard, 2nd Baron Sherard c.1670 and remodelled by the 4th Earl of Harborough c.1776. The orangery was added c.1820 and additional ranges were added by architect John Thomas Micklethwaite for brewer John Gretton in 1894–98.

Stapleford Park had passed down in the Sherard and Tamblyn family since 1402. The 3rd Baron Sherard was made Earl of Harborough in 1719, the title expiring on the death of the 6th Earl in 1859. The estate was then bought in 1885 by James Hornsby and sold in 1894 to John Gretton, who carried out much alteration and new building. His son, John Gretton, MP, who succeeded him in 1899, subsequently became Baron Gretton.

American fast-food restaurateur and hotelier Bob Payton bought the house from Lord Gretton in 1988 to convert it into a hotel. He restored the buildings, according to his obituary "hiring Wedgwood, Turnbull & Asser, Crabtree & Evelyn to decorate its rooms".

The hotel ceased trading on 16 October 2024. The 48-bed house and its 54-acre grounds are on the market for £18,000,000 in 2026.

St Mary Magdalene's Church in the park was built in 1783 by George Richardson for the 4th Earl Harborough.

== Lord Harborough's Curve ==
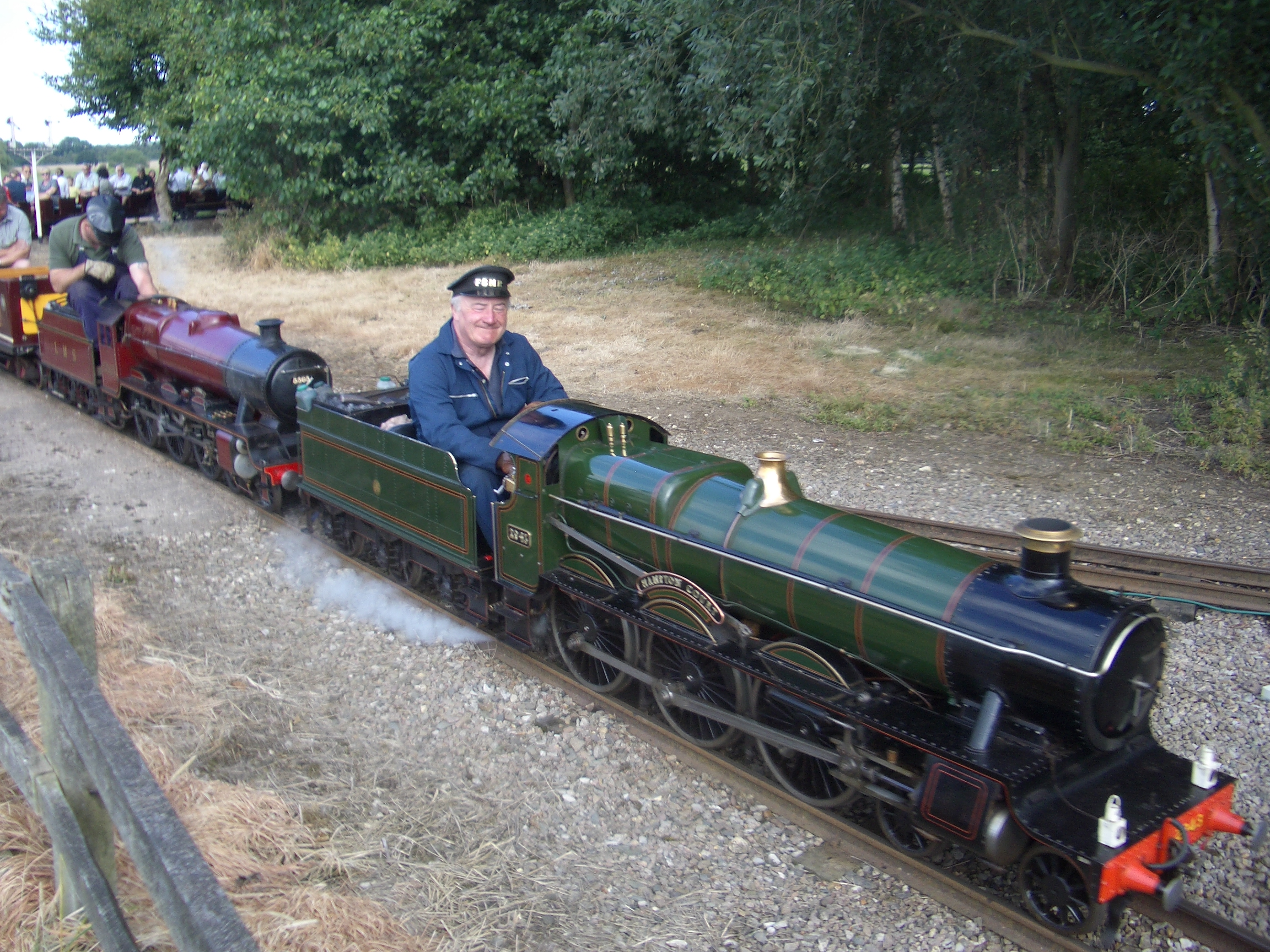
Stapleford Miniature Railway

The 6th Earl objected to a proposal in 1844 to run the Syston and Peterborough Railway through Stapleford Park along the course of the River Eye. Its construction would threaten the struggling Oakham Canal, of which he was a shareholder. The dispute led to a series of brawls and confrontations between the Earl's men and canal employees on one side and the railway's surveyors on the other with up to 300 involved in each skirmish. The dispute has been called the "Battle of Saxby".

Eventually the railway ran around Stapleford Park in what is known as "Lord Harborough's Curve". The tight bend was a nuisance for the express trains, and later when the Midland and Great Northern Joint Railway built a connection to Bourne, the opportunity was taken to reduce the curve, with Saxby station being moved in the process. Lord Harborough had died in the meantime and the estate had been bought by Lord Gretton, who was more sympathetic to the railway.

In 1958, the Stapleford Miniature Railway was constructed by the 2nd Lord Gretton in the parkland, as part of a public attraction which also included a lion reserve. The park and house became a major tourist attraction through the 1960s and 70s. The park though closed in 1982 and the house was sold to become an exclusive country hotel. The railway and parkland, however, are still owned by the Gretton family, and open for charity a few times a year.

=== Filming ===
- British Pathé made the short film "Stately Home Railway" here, in 1964. It featured the miniature steam locomotive 'Blanche of Lancaster' which is now at the Bickington Steam Railway, Trago Mills, Devon.
- It was later used in the Mrs Thursday television series' episode, "The Train from Dunrich House" broadcast on 10 January 1967.
