= Robert Sherard, 6th Earl of Harborough =

British peer

The Right Honourable The Earl of Harborough

Personal details
- Born: Robert Sherard; 26 August 1797
- Died: 28 July 1859 (aged 61)
- Spouse: Mary Eliza Temple (m. 1843)
- Relations: Henry Lowther, 3rd Earl of Lonsdale (nephew); William Lowther (nephew); Robert Sherard (grandson)
- Children: 3
- Parent(s): Philip Sherard, 5th Earl of Harborough; Eleanor Monckton

Robert Sherard, 6th Earl of Harborough (26 August 1797 – 28 July 1859), styled Lord Sherard from 1797 to 1799, was a British peer.

== Early life ==
Sherard was born on 26 August 1797. He was the only son of Philip Sherard, 5th Earl of Harborough and Eleanor (née Monckton) (1772–1809). He had six sisters, including Lady Lucy Eleanor Sherard (who married Henry Lowther), Lady Anna Maria Sherard (who married William Cuffe), Lady Sophia Sherard (who married Sir Thomas Whichcote, 6th Baronet and William Evans-Freke, 8th Baron Carbery after Sir Thomas' death), and Lady Susan Sherard (who married General John Reeve, of Leadenham House).

His paternal grandparents were Robert Sherard, 4th Earl of Harborough and his wife Jane Reeve. His maternal grandfather was Col. Hon. John Monckton of Fineshade Abbey, son of John Monckton, 1st Viscount Galway. Through his sister Lady Lucy, he was uncle to Henry Lowther, 3rd Earl of Lonsdale, and diplomat William Lowther.

== Career ==
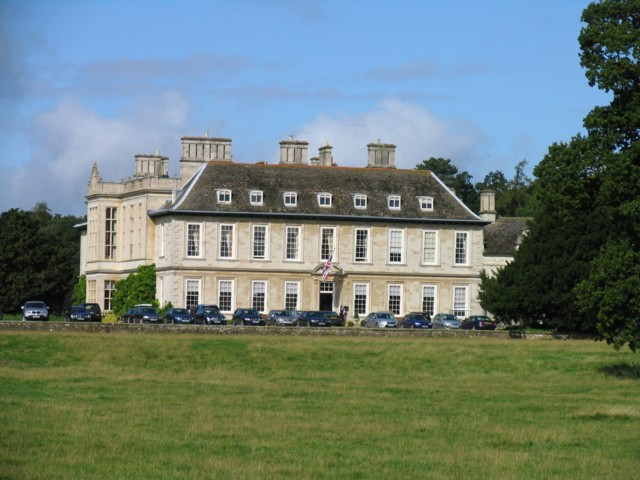
Stapleford Park, Harborough's country seat

In 1844, Lord Harborough was involved in an extended battle, both legal and physical, with Midland Railway (Note: Midland Railway was formed in 1832 in Leicestershire and Nottinghamshire to serve local coal owners.) over its proposal to run the Syston and Peterborough Railway along the course of the River Eye through Stapleford Park, Harborough's country seat in Stapleford in Leicestershire. Its construction would threaten the struggling Oakham Canal, of which Harborough was a shareholder along with Lord Winchilsea. The dispute led to a series of brawls and confrontations between Harborough's men and canal employees (who borrowed cannons from Harborough's yacht to barricade the towing path) on one side and the railway's surveyors on the other with up to 300 involved in each skirmish. The dispute has been called the "Battle of Saxby".

The construction of the railway was authorised by an act of Parliament and a second act of Parliament to allow the canal to be sold and abandoned was obtained on 27 July 1846. After which Oakham Canal was absorbed by Midland and the Syston and Peterborough Railway was built, partly along the canal's course and around Stapleford Park in what is known as "Lord Harborough's Curve". The railway from Syston to Melton Mowbray opened on 1 September 1846. It would be more than a year before the sale of the canal was finally completed, on 29 October 1847, but just six months after that, the line from Melton Mowbray to Oakham opened on 1 May 1848. The purchase price enabled a final distribution of £44.35 to be made on each of the original shares.

After his death in 1859, the Harborough's Stapleford Park estate was sold to Lord Gretton, who was more sympathetic to the railway, and when the Midland and Great Northern Joint Railway built a connection to Bourne, the opportunity was taken to reduce the curve, which was a nuisance for the express trains, with Saxby station being moved in the process.

=== Titles ===
Upon his father's death on 10 December 1807, he succeeded as the 6th Earl of Harborough in the Peerage of Great Britain and the 8th Baron of Sherard in the Peerage of Ireland.

On his death without issue in 1859, the Earldom of Harborough became extinct and the Irish Barony of Sherard passed to his kinsman, Philip Castell Sherard, a great-great-great-great-grandson of the 1st Baron Sherard.

== Personal life ==
Lord Harborough had a relationship with, but never married, Emma Sarah (née Love) Calcroft Kennedy (1801–1881), a professional actress and contralto singer. Emma had married Captain Granby Hales Calcraft in 1828 but ran off with Harborough the following year. Together, Emma and Robert had three illegitimate sons, including:

- Rev. Bennet Sherard Calcraft Kennedy (1832–1886), who married Jane Stanley Wordsworth, a granddaughter of the poet William Wordsworth. Their son was author and journalist Robert Harborough Sherard, a friend, and the first biographer, of Oscar Wilde.
- Edward Sherard Calcraft Kennedy (1837–1900), an artist who married Emily Paul in 1857 and, after their divorce, Florence Elizabeth Laing, a daughter of Samuel Laing.

On 27 November 1843, Lord Harborough married Mary Eliza Temple (d. 1886), a daughter of Edward Dalby Temple, Esq. (only son of the Rev. Thomas William Temple) and the former Caroline Honywood (a daughter of Sir John Honywood, 4th Baronet and Lady Frances Courtenay, sister of William Courtenay, 9th Earl of Devon and twelfth daughter of William Courtenay, 2nd Viscount Courtenay and de jure 8th Earl of Devon).

Lord Harborough died, without legitimate issue, on 28 July 1859. After his death. Lady Harborough married Maj. Thomas William Claggett of the Indian Army, later a magistrate for Leicester, on 20 April 1864.

Peerage of Great Britain
Preceded by Philip Sherard	Earl of Harborough; 1807–1859	Extinct
Peerage of Ireland
Preceded by Philip Sherard	Baron Sherard; 1807–1859	Succeeded by Philip Castell Sherard
