= Lucy Manners, Duchess of Rutland =

Her Grace The Duchess of Rutland
- Born: Lucy Sherard c. 1685
- Died: 27 October 1751 (aged 65–66)
- Spouse: John Manners, 2nd Duke of Rutland (m. 1713; died 1721)
- Children: 8, including Sherard, Robert, and Charles
- Parent(s): Bennet Sherard, 2nd Baron Sherard; Elizabeth Christopher
- Relatives: William Sherard, 1st Baron Sherard (grandfather); Bennet Sherard (cousin)

Lucy Manners, Duchess of Rutland (née Sherard) (c. 1685 – 27 October 1751), was a British heiress who married John Manners, 2nd Duke of Rutland.

== Early life ==
Lucy was born around 1685 and was the daughter of the former Elizabeth Christopher and Bennet Sherard, 2nd Baron Sherard, an MP for Leicestershire who served as Lord Lieutenant of Rutland.

Her mother was the daughter and co-heiress of Sir Robert Christopher of Alford. Her paternal grandfather was William Sherard, 1st Baron Sherard, a member of the Honourable Band of Gentlemen Pensioners under King James I. Through her uncle Hon. Philip Sherard, MP for Rutland, she was a first cousin of Bennet Sherard and Margaret Sherard, the wife of The Most Rev. John Gilbert, Archbishop of York.

== Personal life ==
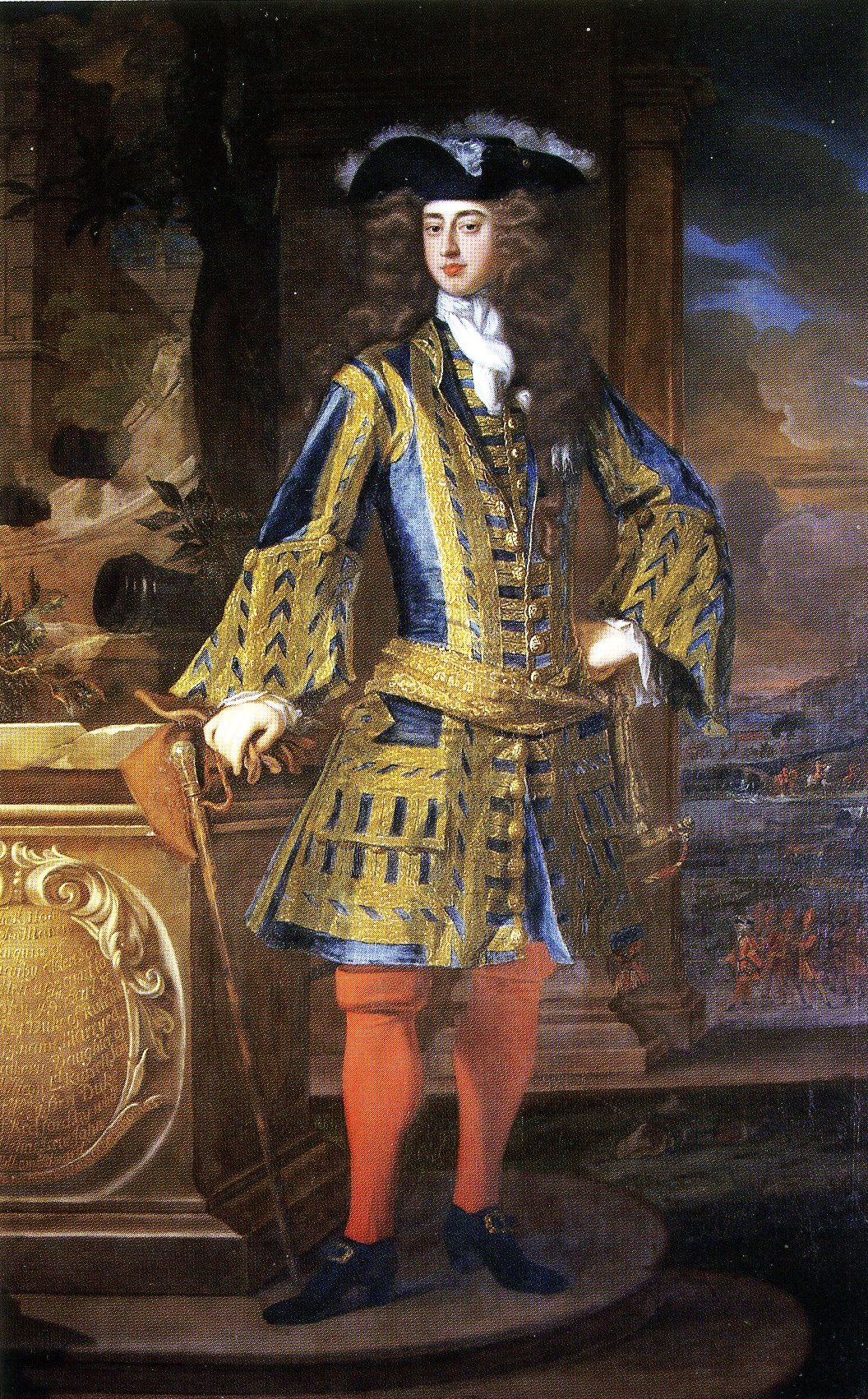
Her husband, John Manners, 2nd Duke of Rutland, by Jean-Baptiste Closterman

On 1 January 1713, she was married to John Manners, 2nd Duke of Rutland, the son of John Manners, 1st Duke of Rutland and his third wife Catherine Wriothesley Noel (daughter of Baptist Noel, 3rd Viscount Campden). The Duke was widowed from Catherine Russell (daughter of William Russell, Lord Russell and Lady Rachel Wriothesley), with whom he had nine children, including John Manners, 3rd Duke of Rutland, Lord William Manners, Lady Catherine Manners (wife of Henry Pelham), Lady Elizabeth Manners (wife of John Monckton, 1st Viscount Galway), Lady Frances Manners (wife of Hon. Richard Arundell). Together, Lucy and John were the parents of:

- Lord Sherard Manners (c. 1713–1742), who became MP for Tavistock.
- Lord James Manners (1720–1790)
- Lord George Manners (d. 1721)
- Lady Caroline Manners (d. 1769), who married Sir Henry Harpur, 5th Baronet, in 1734. After his death in 1748, she married Sir Robert Burdett, 4th Baronet in 1753.
- Lady Lucy Manners (c. 1717–1788), who married William Graham, 2nd Duke of Montrose in 1742.
- Lord Robert Manners (c. 1721–1782), who married Mary Digges in 1756.
- Lord Henry Manners (d. 1745)
- Lord Charles Manners (d. 1761).

Her husband died on 22 February 1721. The Duchess of Rutland lived another thirty years before her death on 27 October 1751. She lived at Beaufort House, Chelsea.

== See also ==
- Duchess of Rutland
