= Robert Sherard, 4th Earl of Harborough =

British clergyman

The Right Honourable The Earl of Harborough
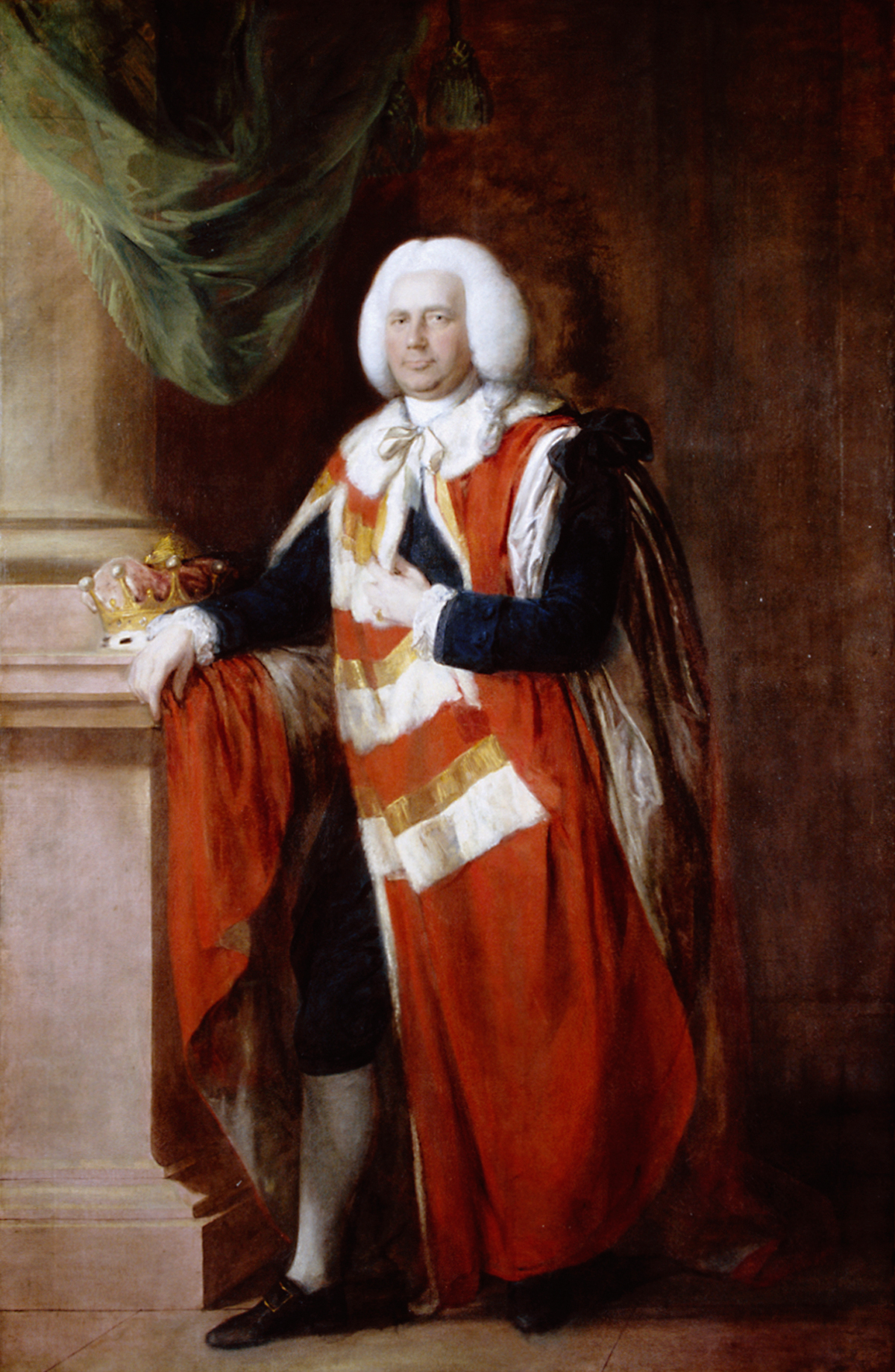

Personal details
- Born: Robert Sherard; 21 October 1719
- Died: 21 April 1799 (aged 79)
- Spouse(s): Catherine Hearst (m. 1762; died 1765) Jane Reeve (m. 1767; died 1770) Dorothy Roberts (m. 1772; died 1781)
- Children: Philip, 5th Earl of Harborough, Lucy, Sophia
- Parent(s): Philip Sherard, 2nd Earl of Harborough; Anne Pedley
- Relatives: Philip Pusey (grandson); Edward Bouverie Pusey (grandson); Ann Jebb (niece); Bennet Sherard (grandfather)
- Education: Eton College; Christ Church, Oxford
- Alma mater: Merton College, Oxford

The Reverend Robert Sherard, 4th Earl of Harborough (21 October 1719 – 21 April 1799) was a British clergyman who inherited the earldom of Harborough.

== Early life ==
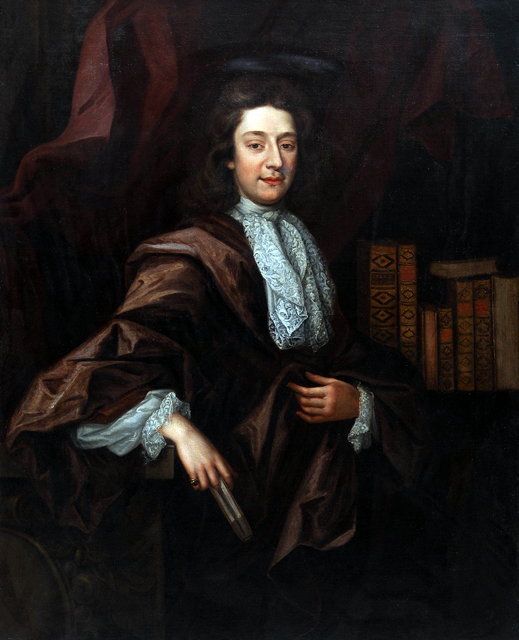
Portrait of his father, the 2nd Earl of Harborough, by Frans van Stampart

Born on 21 October 1719, he was one of six sons and eight daughters born to Philip Sherard, 2nd Earl of Harborough by his wife, the former Anne Pedley (d. c. 1749). Among his siblings were brothers Bennet Sherard, 3rd Earl of Harborough, Hon. John Sherard, Hon. Daniel Sherard, a Naval officer, and Lt.-Gen. Hon. Philip Sherard of the 69th Regiment of Foot. Among his sisters was Lady Dorothy Sherard, who married Rev. James Torkington of Great Stukeley (Rector of Kings Ripton and Little Stukeley). His father, a Member of Parliament for Rutland, succeeded to the earldom of his cousin, Bennet Sherard, 1st Earl of Harborough, in 1732.

His paternal grandparents were Bennet Sherard of Whissendine, and the former Dorothy Fairfax (a daughter of Henry Fairfax, 4th Lord Fairfax of Cameron). His aunt Margaret Sherard was the wife of The Most Rev. John Gilbert, Archbishop of York. Through his sister, Lady Dorothy, he was uncle to the political reformer and radical writer Ann Jebb, wife of reformer John Jebb. His mother was the daughter and heiress of Nicholas Pedley of Washingley (son and heir of Sir Nicholas Pedley, Serjeant-at-Law) and the former Frances Apreece (daughter of Robert Apreece).

After attending Eton, he matriculated at Christ Church, Oxford, in December 1737, before switching colleges and graduating from Merton College, Oxford in 1740. Three years later he was ordained Deacon and then Priest at the Spring Gardens Chapel, Westminster.

== Career ==
As a younger son of an earl, he was part of a large group that entered the Church of England, in substantial numbers, where they were "rewarded by generous preferment which made them financially independent of their elder brothers."

From 1743 until 1773, Rev. Sherard served as Rector of Wistow in Huntingdon, and of Teigh in Rutland. He also served as Canon Residentiary of Salisbury from 1757 to 1773 and Prebendary of Southwell from 1761 to 1778. In the 1780s, he had three churches built: Holy Trinity Church, Teigh in Rutland and St Mary Magdalene's Church, Stapleford and St Peter's, Saxby in Leicestershire.

On 23 February 1770, upon the death of his older brother, who had married four times but was without surviving male heir, he inherited the earldom of Harborough and the family residence, Stapleford Park. Although he gradually relinquished his clerical preferments, he never resigned his Holy Orders. Around 1772, he purchased the Lordship of Wymondham, a township on the verge of the Sherard estates. With the assistance of his steward, William Reeve, who was also his father-in-law and friend, Lord Harborough consolidated all the Sherard landholdings, including estates in Leicestershire, Rutland, and South Kesteven, before his death.

As a member of the House of Lords for 29 years during the late Georgian period, there is no record of the Earl participating in debates and he was only in his place on 24 occasions. He did not attend debates on the American War of Independence, but he did attend the trial of Elizabeth Pierrepont, Duchess of Kingston in 1776 when she was found guilty of bigamy.

== Personal life ==
Lord Harborough was married, and widowed, three times during his lifetime. On 17 May 1762, he was married to Catherine Hearst (d. 1765), eldest daughter and co-heiress of Edward Hearst, a Wiltshire landowner and one of the principal lay residents of the Cathedral close, Salisbury. As his wife predeceased her father, under the terms of her father's will, his fortune went wholly to his other daughter, Caroline, except for Aula le Stage, Hearst's house on the west side of the close, which went to Sherard.

After her death in 1765, he remarried to Jane Reeve (d. 1770), the daughter of his friend William Reeve of Melton Mowbray, on 10 January 1767. Together, they were the parents of:

- Philip Sherard, 5th Earl of Harborough (1767–1807), who married Eleanor Monckton (1772–1809), second daughter and co-heiress of Col. Hon. John Monckton of Fineshade Abbey (a son of John Monckton, 1st Viscount Galway) and Anne Adams.
- Lady Lucy Sherard (d. 1858), who married Sir Thomas Cave, 7th Baronet MP in 1791. After his death, she married Hon. Philip Bouverie-Pusey (1746–1828), the eldest son of Jacob Bouverie, 1st Viscount Folkestone, by his second wife, the Hon. Elizabeth Marsham (eldest daughter of Robert Marsham, 1st Baron Romney), in 1798.

After her death in 1770, he remarried thirdly to Dorothy Roberts (d. 1781), daughter and heiress of William Roberts of Glaiston, on 25 May 1772. Through his marriage, he gained manorial rights at Thorpe by Water in Rutland. They were the parents of:

- Lady Sophia-Dorothea Sherard (d. 1781), who died aged six.

In 1780, his elder sister, Lady Dorothy Tarkington, died and within twelve months, he lost his unmarried sister, Lady Lucy Sherard, his daughter Lady Dorothea Sophia Sherard, and his third wife, Lady Harborough, on 5 November 1781. Lord Harborough died on 21 April 1799 and was succeeded in the earldom by his son, Philip.

=== Descendants ===
Through his son Philip, he was a grandfather of Robert Sherard, 6th Earl of Harborough, and Lady Lucy Eleanor Sherard, who married the Hon. Henry Lowther, MP, second son of William Lowther, 1st Earl of Lonsdale (parents of seven children, including Henry Lowther, 3rd Earl of Lonsdale and diplomat William Lowther).

Through his daughter Lady Lucy, he was a grandfather of Philip Pusey (1799–1855) (who married Lady Emily Herbert, daughter of Henry Herbert, 2nd Earl of Carnarvon), Edward Bouverie Pusey (1800–1882), an English churchman, for more than fifty years Regius Professor of Hebrew at the University of Oxford, and Charlotte Pusey (wife of Richard Lynch Cotton).

Peerage of Great Britain
Preceded by Bennet Sherard	Earl of Harborough; 1770–1799	Succeeded by Philip Sherard
