= Laurence Howard =

Sir Sir Laurence Howard KCVO OBE

Lord Lieutenant of Rutland
- In office 2003–2018
- Preceded by: Sir Thomas Kennedy
- Succeeded by: Dr Sarah Furness

Personal details
- Born: 1943 (age 82–83) England
- Education: University of Nottingham; University of Leicester
- Occupation: Neurophysiologist; Magistrate

Sir Laurence Howard KCVO OBE was the Lord Lieutenant of Rutland. He was appointed in 2003 in succession to Air Chief Marshal Sir Thomas Kennedy, having served as a deputy lieutenant since 1997. He is a former chairman of the Central Council of Magistrates' Courts Committees, serving on the bench in Leicestershire for 25 years. He was also the honorary air commodore of 504 County of Nottingham Squadron for ten years, ending in 2018.

Howard was born in the south of England, took his degree in physiological science at University of Nottingham and his PhD in neurophysiology at Leicester. He joined Leicester University in 1974 and was appointed as sub-dean to the medical school, and subsequently as sub-dean of the Faculty of Medicine and Biological Sciences. He retired from the university in 2006.

He was awarded an Honorary Degree of Doctor of Laws (LLD) by the University of Leicester in 2014. He was appointed Knight Commander of the Royal Victorian Order (KCVO) in the 2017 Birthday Honours.

Honorary titles
Preceded by Sir Thomas Kennedy	Lord Lieutenant of Rutland; 2003–2018	Succeeded by Sarah Furness
