= Lord Sherard Manners =

English nobleman and Member of Parliament

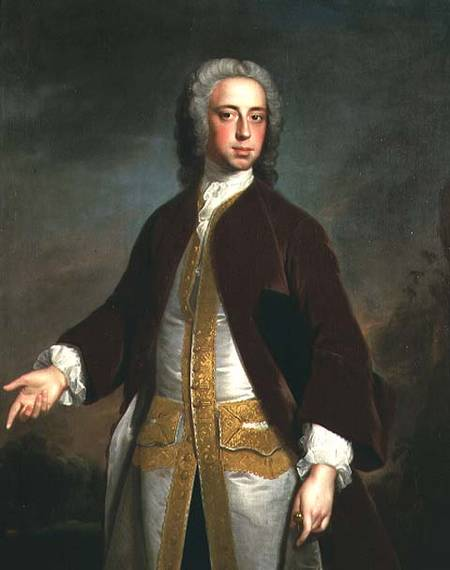
- Lord Sherard Manners by Allan Ramsay

Member of Parliament for Tavistock
- In office 1741–1742 Serving with Lord Loughguyre
- Preceded by: Lord Loughguyre; Sidney Meadows
- Succeeded by: Lord Loughguyre; The Viscount Limerick

Personal details
- Born: c. 1713
- Died: 13 January 1742 (aged 28–29)
- Relations: Lord Robert Manners (brother); Lord Charles Manners (brother); John Manners, 3rd Duke of Rutland (half-brother); Lord William Manners (half-brother)
- Parent(s): John Manners, 2nd Duke of Rutland; Lady Lucy Sherard

Lord Sherard Manners (c. 1713 – 13 January 1742) was an English nobleman and Member of Parliament.

== Early life ==
Lord Sherard was born around 1713. He was the eldest son of John Manners, 2nd Duke of Rutland and, his second wife, Lady Lucy Sherard. From his parents marriage, his siblings included Lord James Manners, Lord George Manners, Lady Caroline Manners (wife of Sir Henry Harpur, 5th Baronet and, after his death, Sir Robert Burdett, 4th Baronet), Lady Lucy Manners (wife of William Graham, 2nd Duke of Montrose), Gen. Lord Robert Manners (MP for Kingston upon Hull), Lord Henry Manners, and Maj.-Gen. Lord Charles Manners of the British Army. From his father's first marriage to Catherine Russell (daughter of William Russell, Lord Russell and Lady Rachel Wriothesley), he had nine elder half-siblings, including John Manners, 3rd Duke of Rutland, Lord William Manners (a noted patron of the turf), Lady Catherine Manners (wife of Henry Pelham), Lady Elizabeth Manners (wife of John Monckton, 1st Viscount Galway), and Lady Frances Manners (wife of Hon. Richard Arundell). Together, Lucy and John were the parents of:

His paternal grandparents were John Manners, 1st Duke of Rutland and, his third wife, Catherine Wriothesley Noel (daughter of Baptist Noel, 3rd Viscount Campden). His maternal grandparents were the former Elizabeth Christopher and Bennet Sherard, 2nd Baron Sherard, MP for Leicestershire who served as Lord Lieutenant of Rutland.

== Career ==
In 1741, Thomas Pitt, the Prince of Wales's manager for the Cornish boroughs, offered to find Manners a seat for £800, which Lord Sherard declined to pay. Instead, John Russell, 4th Duke of Bedford (the Whig Lord Privy Seal) brought him in for Tavistock, and he was returned as Member of Parliament for the borough in 1741. He was absent from the division on the chairman of the elections committee in December 1741, and died 13 January 1742. After his death, he was succeeded by The Viscount Limerick.

Parliament of Great Britain
Preceded by Lord Loughguyre; Sidney Meadows	Member of Parliament for Tavistock; 1741–1742; With: Lord Loughguyre	Succeeded by Lord Loughguyre; The Viscount Limerick
