= Bennet Sherard, 3rd Earl of Harborough =

British aristocrat (1709–1770)

The Right Honourable The Earl of Harborough

Personal details
- Born: Bennet Sherard; 3 September 1709
- Died: 23 February 1770 (aged 60)
- Spouse(s): Lady Elizabeth Verney (m. 1748; died 1756) Frances Noel (m. 1757; died 1760) Margaret Hill (m. 1761; died 1766) Elizabeth Cave (m. 1767; died 1770)
- Relations: Ann Jebb (niece); Bennet Sherard (grandfather)
- Children: Lady Frances Sherard; Hon. Bennet Sherard
- Parent(s): Philip Sherard, 2nd Earl of Harborough; Anne Pedley

Bennet Sherard, 3rd Earl of Harborough (3 September 1709 – 23 February 1770), styled Lord Sherard from 1732 to 1750, was a British aristocrat who inherited the earldom of Harborough.

== Early life ==
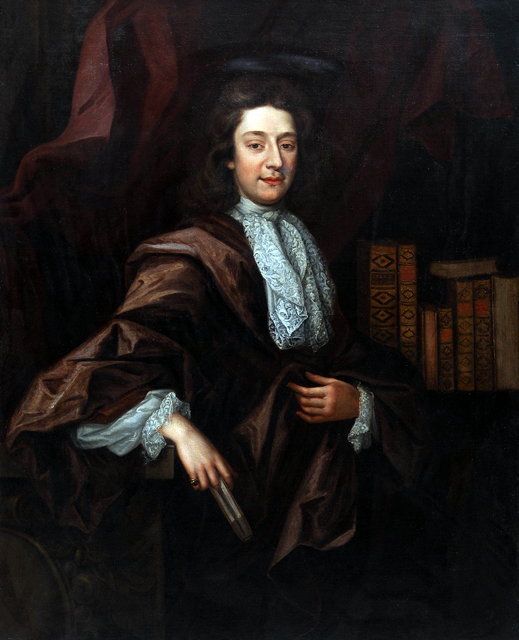
Portrait of his father, the 2nd Earl of Harborough, by Frans van Stampart

Born on 3 September 1709, he was the eldest surviving of six sons and eight daughters born to Philip Sherard, 2nd Earl of Harborough by his wife, the former Anne Pedley (d. c. 1749). Among his siblings were brothers the Rev. Robert Sherard, Hon. John Sherard, Hon. Daniel Sherard, a Naval officer, and Lt.-Gen. Hon. Philip Sherard of the 69th Regiment of Foot. Among his sisters was Lady Dorothy Sherard, who married Rev. James Torkington of Great Stukeley (Rector of Kings Ripton and Little Stukeley). His father, a Member of Parliament for Rutland, succeeded to the earldom of his cousin, Bennet Sherard, 1st Earl of Harborough, in 1732.

His paternal grandparents were Bennet Sherard of Whissendine, and the former Dorothy Fairfax (a daughter of Henry Fairfax, 4th Lord Fairfax of Cameron). His aunt Margaret Sherard was the wife of The Most Rev. John Gilbert, Archbishop of York. Through his sister, Lady Dorothy, he was uncle to the political reformer and radical writer Ann Jebb, wife of reformer John Jebb. His mother was the daughter and heiress of Nicholas Pedley of Washingley (son and heir of Sir Nicholas Pedley, Serjeant-at-Law) and the former Frances Apreece (daughter of Robert Apreece).

== Career ==
Upon his father's death on 20 July 1750, he became the third Earl of Harborough.

== Personal life ==
Lord Harborough married four times during his lifetime. His first marriage was on 28 June 1748 to Lady Elizabeth Verney, daughter of Ralph Verney, 1st Earl Verney and the former Catherine Paschall (a daughter of Henry Paschall). Lady Elizabeth died on 7 June 1756.

On 2 July 1757, he married, secondly, to Frances Noel (d. 1760), third daughter and co-heiress of William Noel, Justice of the Common Pleas from 1757 to 1762 (son of Sir John Noel, 4th Baronet) and the former Elizabeth Trollope (daughter of Sir Thomas Trollope, 3rd Baronet). Together, they were the parents of one daughter:

- Lady Frances Sherard, who married Maj.-Gen. George Morgan in 1776.

On 31 March 1761, he married, thirdly, to Margaret Hill (1729–1766/7), half-sister of Noel Hill, 1st Baron Berwick and daughter of Thomas Hill of Tern and Anne Powys (a daughter of Richard Powys of Hintlesham). They were the parents of one child:

- Hon. Bennet Sherard (d. 1768), styled Lord Sherard, who died in infancy on 21 February 1768.

On 8 October 1767, he married, lastly, to Elizabeth Cave (1739/40–1797), eldest daughter of Sir Thomas Cave, 5th Baronet and Elizabeth Davies (only daughter and heiress of Dr. Griffin Davies of Birmingham.

As the earl died on 23 February 1770 without surviving male issue, his titles passed to his younger brother, Robert. The dowager Countess of Harborough died on 5 March 1797.

Peerage of Great Britain
Preceded by Philip Sherard	Earl of Harborough; 1750–1770	Succeeded by Robert Sherard
