= Philip Sherard, 2nd Earl of Harborough =

British landowner and politician

The Right Honourable The Earl of Harborough
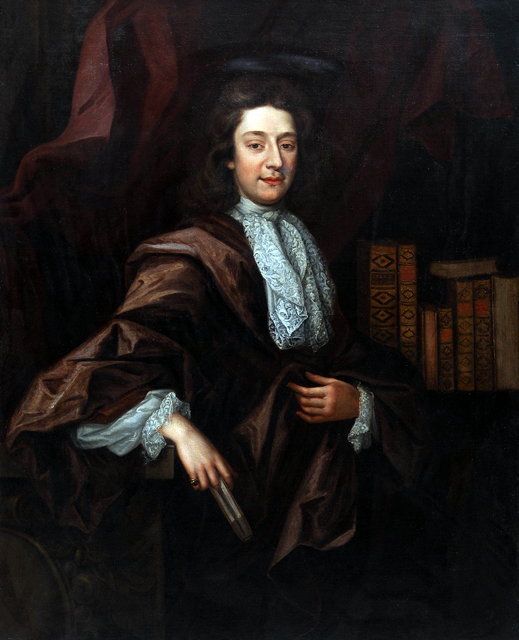
- Portrait of Lord Harborough by Frans van Stampart

Member of Parliament for Rutland
- In office 1708–1710
- Preceded by: Richard Halford; Sir Thomas Mackworth
- Succeeded by: Lord Finch; John Noel

Personal details
- Born: Philip Sherard c. 1680
- Died: 20 July 1750 (aged 69–70) Stapleford, Leicestershire
- Spouse: Anne Pedley (after 1703)
- Relations: Robert Sherard, 4th Earl of Harborough (grandson)
- Children: 14
- Parent(s): Bennet Sherard; Dorothy Fairfax Stapylton

Philip Sherard, 2nd Earl of Harborough (c. 1680 – 20 July 1750), of Whissendine, Rutland, was a British landowner and Whig politician who sat in the House of Commons from 1708 to 1710 and later succeeded to the peerage as Earl of Harborough.

== Early life ==
Sherard was the eldest son of Bennet Sherard, of Whissendine, Rutland, and his wife Dorothy Fairfax, daughter of Henry Fairfax, 4th Lord Fairfax of Cameron, Scotland, and widow of Robert Stapylton of Wighill, Yorkshire.

He was admitted at Middle Temple in 1696. In 1699, the manor of Hellewell was settled on him by his father, who died in 1701, leaving him the rest of his estates.

== Career ==
Sherard was appointed a Gentleman of the Privy Chamber to Queen Anne in 1705. At the 1708 British general election, he was returned as a Whig Member of Parliament for Rutland. He voted for the naturalization of the Palatines and was twice a teller on non-political matters in 1709. In 1710, he voted for the impeachment of Dr Sacheverell. He was defeated at the 1710 British general election. In 1714, his appointment as Gentleman of the Privy Chamber was renewed for the lifetime of George I. He was appointed deputy lieutenant of Rutland in 1715. At the 1722 British general election he attempted to regain his seat at Rutland, but was defeated.

Sherard succeeded his cousin Bennet Sherard, 1st Earl of Harborough to the earldom on 16 October 1732. He was appointed Lord Lieutenant of Rutland in 1733. In 1744, he was appointed a deputy lieutenant of Lincolnshire.

== Personal life ==
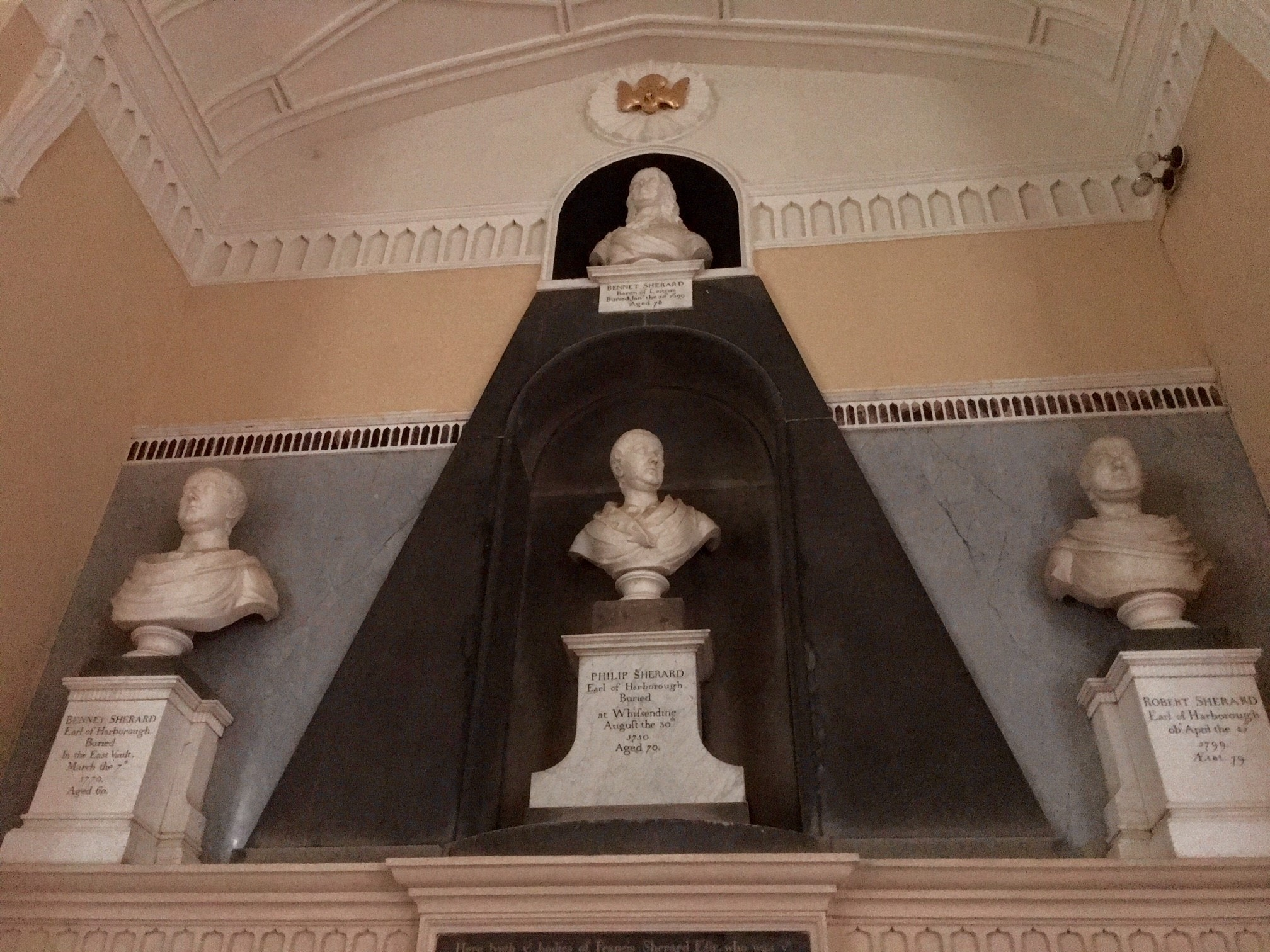
The memorial to Philip Sherard, 2nd Earl of Harborough, (middle) in St Mary Magdalene's Church, Stapleford

On 12 March 1703, Harborough was married to Anne Pedley, the daughter and heiress of Nicholas Pedley of Washingley (son and heir of Sir Nicholas Pedley Serjeant-at-Law) and Frances Apreece (a daughter of Robert Apreece of Washingley). They were the parents of six sons and eight daughters including:

- Bennet Sherard, 3rd Earl of Harborough (1709–1770), who married Lady Elizabeth Verney, daughter of Ralph Verney, 1st Earl Verney; secondly, Frances Noel, granddaughter of Sir John Noel, 4th Baronet; thirdly, Margaret Hill, half-sister of Noel Hill, 1st Baron Berwick; fourthly, Elizabeth Cave, daughter of Sir Thomas Cave, 5th Baronet.
- Hon. John Sherard (d. 1746), a barrister and lieutenant of the Yeomen of the Guard who died unmarried.
- Rev. Robert Sherard, 4th Earl of Harborough (1719–1799), who married three times and had issue.
- Hon. Daniel Sherard, (1722–1744), a Lt. in the Royal Navy.
- Hon. Philip Sherard (1726/7–1790), a Lt-Gen. in the British Army during the Seven Years' War who died unmarried.
- Lady Dorothy Sherard, who married Rev. James Torkington, and had issue.
- Lady Lucy Sherard (d. 1781), who died unmarried.
- Lady Susan Sherard (d. 1765), who died unmarried.
- Lady Ursula Sherard (d. 1745), who died unmarried.

Lord Harborough died at Stapleford, Leicestershire, on 20 July 1750, and was buried near Whissendine. He was succeeded by Bennet Sherard, 3rd Earl of Harborough.

Parliament of Great Britain
Preceded by Richard Halford; Sir Thomas Mackworth	Member of Parliament for Rutland; 1708–1710	Succeeded by Lord Finch; John Noel
Honorary titles
Preceded by Bennet Sherard	Lord Lieutenant of Rutland; 1733–1750	Succeeded by Lord Burghley
Peerage of Great Britain
Preceded by Bennet Sherard	Earl of Harborough; 1732–1750	Succeeded by Bennet Sherard
