= Thomas Taylour, 3rd Marquess of Headfort =

Irish peer

- Marquess of Headfort
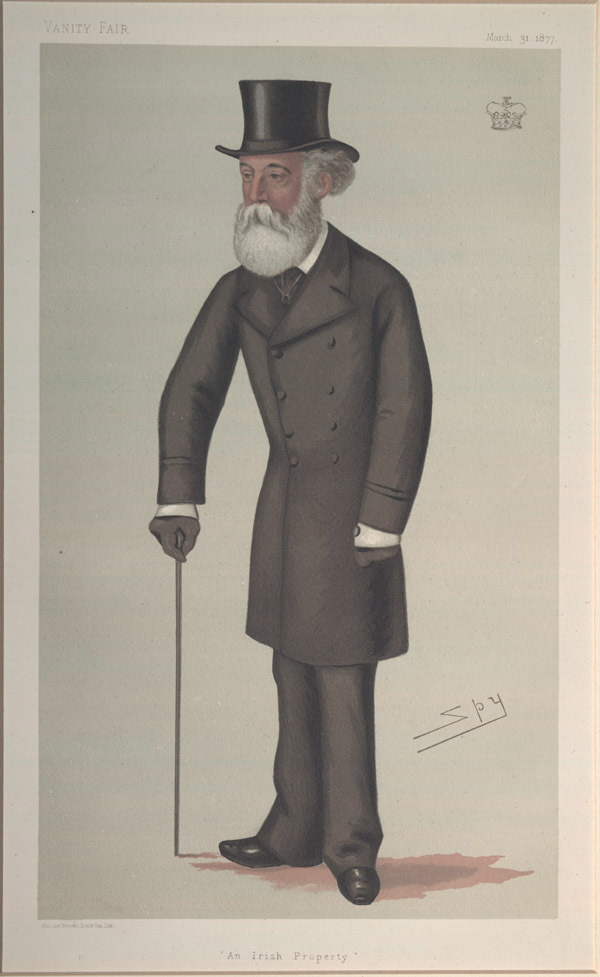

- Coat of arms
- Tenure: 1870–1894
- Predecessor: Thomas Taylour, 2nd Marquess of Headfort
- Successor: Geoffrey Taylour, 4th Marquess of Headfort
- Born: 1 November 1822
- Died: 22 July 1894 (aged 71)
- Spouse: Amelia Thompson (m. 1842; died 1864) Emily Thynne (m. 1875)
- Issue: Thomas Taylour, Earl of Bective; Hon. William Taylour; Lady Evelyn Taylour; Lady Madeline Taylour; Lady Adelaide Taylour; Lady Isabel Taylour; Lady Florence Taylour; Lady Beatrix Taylour; Geoffrey Taylour, 4th Marquess of Headfort

Thomas Taylour, 3rd Marquess of Headfort KP PC (I) (1 November 1822 – 22 July 1894) was an Irish peer, styled Lord Kenlis until 1829 and Earl of Bective from 1829 to 1870.

He was High Sheriff of Meath in 1844, of Cavan in 1846, and of Westmorland in 1853. From 1852 to 1853, he was State Steward to the Lord Lieutenant of Ireland. In 1854, Bective succeeded his father-in-law as Member of Parliament for Westmorland, sitting as a Conservative.

He succeeded his father as Marquess of Headfort in 1870. He also inherited his father's title of Baron Kenlis, in the Peerage of the United Kingdom, and so gained a seat in the House of Lords; his son Thomas replaced him in the House of Commons for Westmorland.

He was an Irish Freemason, having been initiated in Lodge No 244 (Kells, Ireland), and served as the Provincial Grand Master of Meath from 1888 until his death and burial at Virginia, County Cavan in 1894. He was also an English Freemason and belonged to a number of Masonic Orders. In particular, he served as Grand Sovereign (the Head of the Order) of the Masonic and Military Order of the Red Cross of Constantine from 1866 until 1874. He succeeded his father as Honorary Colonel of the Royal Meath Militia.

He held significant landholdings, covering nearly 43,000 acres in Ireland and Great Britain.

== Family ==
On 20 July 1842, he married Amelia Thompson, daughter of William Thompson. They had seven children:

- Thomas Taylour, Earl of Bective (1844–1893)
- Hon. William Arthur Taylour (5 March 1845 – 1 December 1845)
- Lady Evelyn Amelia Taylour (8 August 1846 – 10 July 1866)
- Lady Madeline Olivia Susan Taylour (30 January 1848 – 27 January 1876), married Hon. Charles Frederick Crichton, son of John Crichton, 3rd Earl Erne, and had issue
- Lady Adelaide Louisa Jane Taylour (24 June 1849 – 7 November 1935)
- Lady Isabel Frances Taylour (10 May 1853 – 17 November 1909), married Sir FitzRoy Clayton; mother of Sir Harold Clayton, 10th Baronet
- Lady Florence Jane Taylour (21 June 1855 – 16 August 1907), married Somerset Maxwell, 10th Baron Farnham

His wife Amelia died on 4 December 1864. On 29 November 1875, he married again, to Emily Constantia Thynne, daughter of Rev. Lord John Thynne and granddaughter of Thomas Thynne, 2nd Marquess of Bath. They had two children:

- Lady Beatrix Taylour (6 January 1877 – 3 May 1944), married Hon. Sir George Frederick Stanley
- Geoffrey Taylour, 4th Marquess of Headfort (12 June 1878 – 29 January 1943)

His eldest son Thomas died in 1894, a few months before his father, and so the marquessate passed to Geoffrey, Headfort's only son by his second marriage.

The Dowager Marchioness visited British India to attend the 1903 Delhi Durbar held in January 1903 to celebrated the succession of King Edward VII as Emperor of India. She died in 1926.

Parliament of the United Kingdom
Preceded by Henry Lowther; William Thompson	Member of Parliament for Westmorland; 1854–1870; With: Henry Lowther 1854–1868; William Lowther 1868–1871	Succeeded by William Lowther; Earl of Bective
Honorary titles
Preceded by The Marquess Conyngham	Lord Lieutenant of Meath; 1876–1894	Succeeded by Simon Mangan
Peerage of Ireland
Preceded by Thomas Taylour	Marquess of Headfort; 1870–1894	Succeeded by Geoffrey Taylour
Peerage of the United Kingdom
Preceded by Thomas Taylour	Baron Kenlis; 1870–1894	Succeeded by Geoffrey Taylour
