= Bennet Sherard, 1st Earl of Harborough =

British peer and Member of Parliament

The Right Honourable The Earl of Harborough

Member of Parliament for Rutland
- In office 1713–1714 Serving with Lord Finch
- Preceded by: Lord Finch; Richard Halford
- Succeeded by: Lord Finch; John Noel

Member of Parliament for Leicestershire
- In office 1701–1702 Serving with Lord Roos
- Preceded by: John Verney; John Wilkins
- Succeeded by: John Verney; John Wilkins

Personal details
- Born: Bennet Sherard; 1675
- Died: 16 October 1732 (aged 56–57)
- Party: Whig
- Spouse: Mary Calverley (m. 1696; died 1702)
- Parent: Bennet Sherard, 2nd Baron Sherard

Bennet Sherard, 1st Earl of Harborough (9 October 1677 – 16 October 1732) (created Viscount Sherard in 1718, and Earl of Harborough in 1719) was a British peer and Member of Parliament.

== Early life ==
Born on 9 October 1677, he was the second, but only surviving, son and heir of the former Elizabeth Christopher and Bennet Sherard, 2nd Baron Sherard, an MP for Leicestershire who served as Lord Lieutenant of Rutland. His sister, Hon. Lucy Sherard, married John Manners, 2nd Duke of Rutland.

His mother was the daughter and co-heiress of Sir Robert Christopher of Alford. His paternal grandfather was William Sherard, 1st Baron Sherard, a member of the Honourable Band of Gentlemen Pensioners under King James I. Through his sister, he was uncle to Lord Sherard Manners, MP for Tavistock, Lady Caroline Manners (wife of Sir Henry Harpur, 5th Baronet and, secondly, Sir Robert Burdett, 4th Baronet), Lady Lucy Manners (wife of William Graham, 2nd Duke of Montrose), Lord Robert Manners, and Lord Charles Manners, among others. Through his uncle Hon. Philip Sherard, also an MP for Rutland, he was a first cousin of Bennet Sherard and Margaret Sherard, the wife of The Most Rev. John Gilbert, Archbishop of York.

== Career ==
In 1697 he was serving under his father (the Lord Lieutenant of Rutland) as captain of the Troop of Rutland Horse Militia. In 1700, he succeeded his father Bennet as Baron Sherard, of Leitrim, and shortly thereafter as Lord Lieutenant of Rutland, and was made deputy lieutenant of Lincolnshire the same year. He held these offices until his dismissal in 1712. From 1701 to 1702, he was MP for Leicestershire, and was returned for Rutland in 1713.

He held that seat until 19 October 1714, when he was created Baron Sherard, of Harborough, in the Peerage of Great Britain, and entered the House of Lords. In 1715, he was reappointed to the Lord-Lieutenancy of Rutland, which he held until his death. He was created Viscount Sherard on 31 October 1718 and Earl of Harborough on 8 May 1719.

== Personal life ==
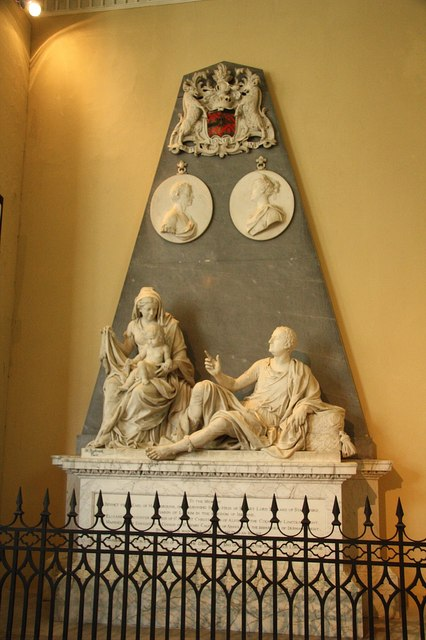
Memorial to the Earl, his Wife, and their dead child. Stapleford church, carving by John Michael Rysbrack

On 30 April 1696, Sherard was married to Mary Calverley (d. 1702), the daughter and co-heiress of Sir Henry Calverley of Eryholme and the former Mary Thompson (a daughter of Sir Henry Thompson of Escrick).

He was succeeded by his cousin Philip as Earl of Harborough, Baron Sherard (in Great Britain and in Ireland), and as Lord-Lieutenant; the Viscountcy of Sherard became extinct upon his death.

Parliament of England
Preceded by John Verney; John Wilkins	Member of Parliament for Leicestershire; 1701–1702; With: Lord Roos	Succeeded by John Verney; John Wilkins
Parliament of Great Britain
Preceded by Lord Finch; Richard Halford	Member of Parliament for Rutland; 1713–1714; With: Lord Finch	Succeeded by Lord Finch; John Noel
Legal offices
Preceded by The Earl of Westmorland	Justice in Eyre north of the Trent; 1719–1732	Succeeded by The Viscount Lymington
Honorary titles
Preceded by The Lord Sherard	Lord Lieutenant of Rutland; 1700–1712	Succeeded by The Earl of Exeter
Preceded by The Earl of Exeter	Lord Lieutenant of Rutland; 1715–1732	Succeeded by Philip Sherard
Peerage of Great Britain
New creation	Earl of Harborough; 1719–1732	Succeeded by Philip Sherard
New creation	Viscount Sherard; 1718–1732	Extinct
New creation	Baron Sherard; 1714–1732	Succeeded by Philip Sherard
Peerage of Ireland
Preceded by Bennet Sherard	Baron Sherard; 1700–1732	Succeeded by Philip Sherard
