= Richard Halford =

English Tory politician

Richard Halford (1662–1742), of Edith Weston, Rutland, England, was an English Tory politician who sat in the English and British House of Commons between 1698 and 1713.

Halford was the eldest son of Charles Halford of Edith Weston, and his wife Elizabeth Mitchell, daughter of Thomas Michell of South Witham, Lincolnshire. He was admitted at Lincoln's Inn in 1679. In 1696, he succeeded his father.

Halford was returned as Member of Parliament (MP) for Rutland at the 1698 English general election. He was returned again at the two general elections of 1701 and in 1702, 1705 and 1708. At the 1710 British general election, he was defeated in the poll but was seated on petition on 23 January 1711. He was not returned at the 1713 British general election.

Halford died unmarried on 28 September 1742, aged 80.

Parliament of England
Preceded by Bennet Sherard; Lord Burghley	Member of Parliament for Rutland; 1698–1707; With: Lord Burghley 1698-1701; Sir Thomas Mackworth 1701-1707	Succeeded by Parliament of Great Britain
Parliament of Great Britain
Preceded by Parliament of England	Member of Parliament for Rutland; 1707–1710; With: Philip Sherard	Succeeded by Lord Finch; John Noel
Preceded by Lord Finch; John Noel	Member of Parliament for Rutland; 1711–1713; With: Lord Finch	Succeeded by Lord Finch; The Lord Sherard
