= John Noel (1659–1718) =

British politician

John Noel (7 November 1659 – 26 December 1718), of North Luffenham, Rutland was a British politician who sat in the House of Commons between 1711 and 1718.

Noel was the 7th son of Baptist Noel, 3rd Viscount Campden, and his fourth wife Lady Elizabeth Bertie, daughter of Montague Bertie, 2nd Earl of Lindsey and was born on 7 November 1659. He entered Middle Temple in 1676 but still had chambers at the Middle Temple in 1681. Late in the summer of 1687, he had a quarrel at a horse-race meeting with Bennet Sherard, 2nd Baron Sherard who resorted to physical violence. This created such a stir among the local gentry that Lord Sunderland, secretary of state instructed Lord Huntingdon lord lieutenant of Leicestershire to see that the difference was smoothed over. In time it was, as Sherard became the father-in-law of Noel when his daughter Elizabeth Lady Irvine (or Irwin), widow of Edward Ingram, 2nd Viscount of Irvine, married him on 27 May 1696. Elizabeth was the sister and coheir of Bennet Sherard, 1st Earl of Harborough, and had at least two children by Noel:

- Bridget (died 1729), who married David Colyear, Viscount Milsington, heir to the Earl of Portmore
- Thomas (died 1788), who married Elizabeth Chapman

Noel was one of several “noble persons” to have a Doctorate of Laws conferred on him at Cambridge University in the presence of Queen Anne on 16 April 1705. In May 1705 he was invited to rejoin the Honourable Order of Little Bedlam. He had previously been a member of this drinking and dining club until it ceased in 1700 and it was now being reestablished. He adopted the nickname ‘Wildhorse’ to comply with the rules of membership.

At the 1710 election Noel was returned as Member of Parliament for Rutland, standing as a Whig. The Earl of Nottingham (Daniel Finch), leader of the Tory interest in the county, resolved to unseat him and following a Commons’ hearing lasting several long sittings, he was unseated in favour of the Tory Richard Halford .

In the 1715 general election Noel was returned unopposed at Rutland as a Whig. He died aged 58 on 26 December 1718.

== Sources ==
Parliament of Great Britain
Preceded by Richard Halford; Philip Sherard	Member of Parliament for Rutland; 1710–1711; With: Lord Finch	Succeeded by Lord Finch; Richard Halford
Preceded by Lord Finch; The Lord Sherard	Member of Parliament for Rutland; 1715–1718; With: Lord Finch	Succeeded by Lord Finch; Marquess of Granby
