= Bennet Sherard, 2nd Baron Sherard =

British politician and Irish peer

The Right Honourable The Lord Sherard DL

Member of Parliament for Leicestershire
- In office 1679–1695 Serving with Lord Roos, Sir John Hartopp, John Verney, Sir Thomas Halford, Sir Thomas Hesilrige
- Preceded by: Lord Roos; George Faunt
- Succeeded by: John Verney; George Ashby

Personal details
- Born: Bennet Sherard; 30 November 1621
- Died: 15 January 1700 (aged 78)
- Spouse: Elizabeth Christopher (m. 1661)
- Relations: Philip Sherard (brother); Bennet Sherard (nephew)
- Children: 4, including Bennet and Lucy
- Parents: William Sherard, 1st Baron Sherard (father); Abigail Cave (mother)
- Education: University of Padua
- Alma mater: St John's College, Oxford

Bennet Sherard, 2nd Baron Sherard DL (baptised 30 November 1621 – 15 January 1700) was an English politician and Irish peer. An influential landowner in Leicestershire and Rutland, he was returned to Parliament by the former county from 1679 through 1695, although his Parliamentary activity was minimal. He entered Parliament as a supporter of the Exclusion Bill, and was one of the Whigs purged from county offices in 1688 over James' policy of religious tolerance. He supported James' overthrow in the Glorious Revolution, and was appointed Lord Lieutenant and Custos Rotulorum of Rutland, offices he held until his death in 1700.

== Early life and family ==
Baptised on 30 November 1621, Sherard was the eldest son of William Sherard, 1st Baron Sherard, and his wife Abigail Cave. He was educated at St John's College, Oxford in 1639, succeeded his father in his (Irish) barony in 1640, and took a Grand Tour in Italy from 1641 to 1644, where he was enrolled at the University of Padua in 1642. While he never took the oaths, he did occupy local office during the Interregnum, serving as a commissioner for assessment in Rutland and as justice of the peace for Leicestershire in 1656. Appointed a commissioner for militia in Leicestershire in March 1660, he continued in local office after the restoration, being appointed to the Rutland bench in July and a commissioner of assessment for both counties in August, serving on the latter until 1680.

== Political career ==
Sherard continued to hold a variety of local offices after the Restoration. He was a commissioner of oyer and terminer for the Midland circuit in 1662, and was appointed a deputy lieutenant of Leicestershire in 1667. He received additional appointments in Lincolnshire in 1670, as deputy lieutenant and justice of the piece for the Parts of Lindsey, although he had resigned both of these posts by 1680. He became a deputy lieutenant of Rutland in 1671, and served as a commissioner for recusants in Leicestershire in 1675.

He first stood for Parliament as a candidate for Leicestershire in the March 1679 English general election, alongside Lord Roos, one of the incumbent MPs. Roos was a lukewarm court supporter, while Sherard's sympathies were unclear. The joint candidacy had met with the approval of a Leicestershire gentry meeting, which would normally have settled the matter. However, the controversy over the Exclusion Bill led Sir John Hartopp, 3rd Baronet, a zealous Whig, to stand for the county as well. During the polling at Market Harborough, rioting broke out; Roos and Sherard were returned by a large margin, but Hartopp lodged an election petition against the result, alleging malpractice by the Sheriff. Sherard's election was admitted, but that of Roos voided; he was granted a peerage and moved to the House of Lords, while Hartopp was returned at the ensuing April by-election. Sherard would continuously represent the county through 1695. He did prove to be a Whig as well, voting in favor of Exclusion.

He showed his greatest Parliamentary activity in 1680, serving on committees considering bills pertaining to trade and election abuses. No activity for him is known during the Oxford Parliament in 1681, and in 1685 was involved with a naturalization bill and economic proposals. In general, he played little role in Parliament, but obviously enjoyed the respect of his fellow gentry in Leicestershire. He was noted as an influential member of the opposition to James II in 1687. During that year, a personal quarrel broke out between Sherard and John Noel at a race meeting, in which Sherard resorted to violence and proposed a duel. The turmoil raised by the event among the Leicestershire gentry was such that the Earl of Sunderland instructed the Earl of Huntingdon, the Lord Lieutenant of Leicestershire to compose it. Noel's uncle Charles Bertie, reflecting on the prospects of a duel, sourly dismissed Sherard as "an old passionate coxcomb who is lame, crazy and aged", but the difference must have been smoothed up effectively, as Noel would marry Sherard's daughter Elizabeth in 1696.

In early 1688, Sherard was dismissed from the bench and deputy lieutenancy in Leicestershire by Huntingdon, for his negative answers to the "Three Questions". He was likewise dismissed from the deputy lieutenancy of Rutland by the Lord Lieutenant there, the Earl of Peterborough. Sherard's deputy lieutenancy was returned in October as James hastily reversed course with the Glorious Revolution looming, but Sherard unsurprisingly proved a supporter of William of Orange and turned out the Leicestershire militia on his behalf. Returned to the Convention Parliament, he was moderately active, showing, as an Irish peer, an interest in protecting the Irish protestants and gentry. He was again made a JP for Leicestershire, and served as a commissioner of assessment for Leicestershire, Lincolnshire and Rutland until 1690.

=== Later life ===
Given his age, it was thought he would stand down at the 1690 election, but was again returned. He showed almost no activity in Parliament, however. When it appeared that the Earl of Rutland (the former Lord Roos) would give up the lord-lieutenancy of Leicestershire in the summer of 1690, Sherard wrote to the Marquess of Carmarthen offering to take up the post and raise a new regiment of volunteers. In the event, Rutland retained the post, but Sherard was appointed Lord Lieutenant of Rutland in August, filling the place left vacant by the dismissal of the Jacobite Peterborough, and Custos Rotulorum of Rutland.

Sherard at last left Parliament in 1695.

== Personal life ==
On 8 March 1661, he married Elizabeth Christopher (d. 1713), by whom he had two sons and four daughters (of whom one son and two daughters survived him), including:

- Hon. Christopher Sherard (1666–1681/2), who died of a fever while at Oxford.
- Bennet Sherard, 1st Earl of Harborough (1677–1732), who married Mary Calverley, the daughter and co-heiress of Sir Henry Calverley of Eryholme.
- Hon. Elizabeth Sherard (1679–1746/7), who married first Edward Ingram, 2nd Viscount of Irvine and second John Noel.
- Hon. Lucy Sherard (c. 1685–1751), who married John Manners, 2nd Duke of Rutland.

Sherard shared his mother's taste for art, and was a patron of various minor composers and painters.

He died on 15 January 1700 and was buried at Stapleford, Leicestershire. He was succeeded by his only surviving son, Bennet Sherard, later created Earl of Harborough.

Parliament of England
Preceded by Lord Roos; George Faunt	Member of Parliament for Leicestershire; 1679–1695; With: Lord Roos 1679; Sir John Hartopp 1679–1681; John Verney 1685–1687; Sir Thomas Halford 1689–1690; Sir Thomas Hesilrige 1690–1695	Succeeded by John Verney; George Ashby
Honorary titles
Preceded by The Earl of Peterborough	Lord Lieutenant of Rutland; 1690–1700	Succeeded by The Lord Sherard
Preceded by The Earl of Gainsborough	Custos Rotulorum of Rutland; 1690–1700	Succeeded by The Lord Sherard
Peerage of Ireland
Preceded by William Sherard	Baron Sherard; 1640–1700	Succeeded by Bennet Sherard
