= Sir Thomas Hesilrige, 4th Baronet =

English politician (1664–1700)

Sir Thomas Hesilrige, 4th Baronet (1664 - 11 July 1700) was an English politician who sat in the House of Commons from 1690 to 1695.

Hesilrige was the son of Sir Thomas Hesilrige, 3rd Baronet and his wife Elizabeth Fenwick, daughter of George Fenwick, of Bruntonhall, Northumberland. He succeeded to the baronetcy on the death of his father in 1680.

In 1687 Hesilrige was appointed Sheriff of Leicestershire and in 1690 was elected member of parliament for Leicestershire, holding the seat until 1695.

Hesilrige died unmarried at the age of 36. He was succeeded in the baronetcy by his uncle Sir Robert Hesilrige, 5th Baronet.

Parliament of England
Preceded by Sir Thomas Halford, 3rd Baronet; The Lord Sherard	Member of Parliament for Leicestershire; 1690–1695; With: The Lord Sherard	Succeeded by George Ashby; John Verney
Baronetage of England
Preceded by Thomas Heselrige	Baronet (of Noseley Hall); 1680–1700	Succeeded by Robert Hesilrige
