= William Lowther (diplomat) =

British diplomat and Conservative politician

The Honourable William Lowther JP DL
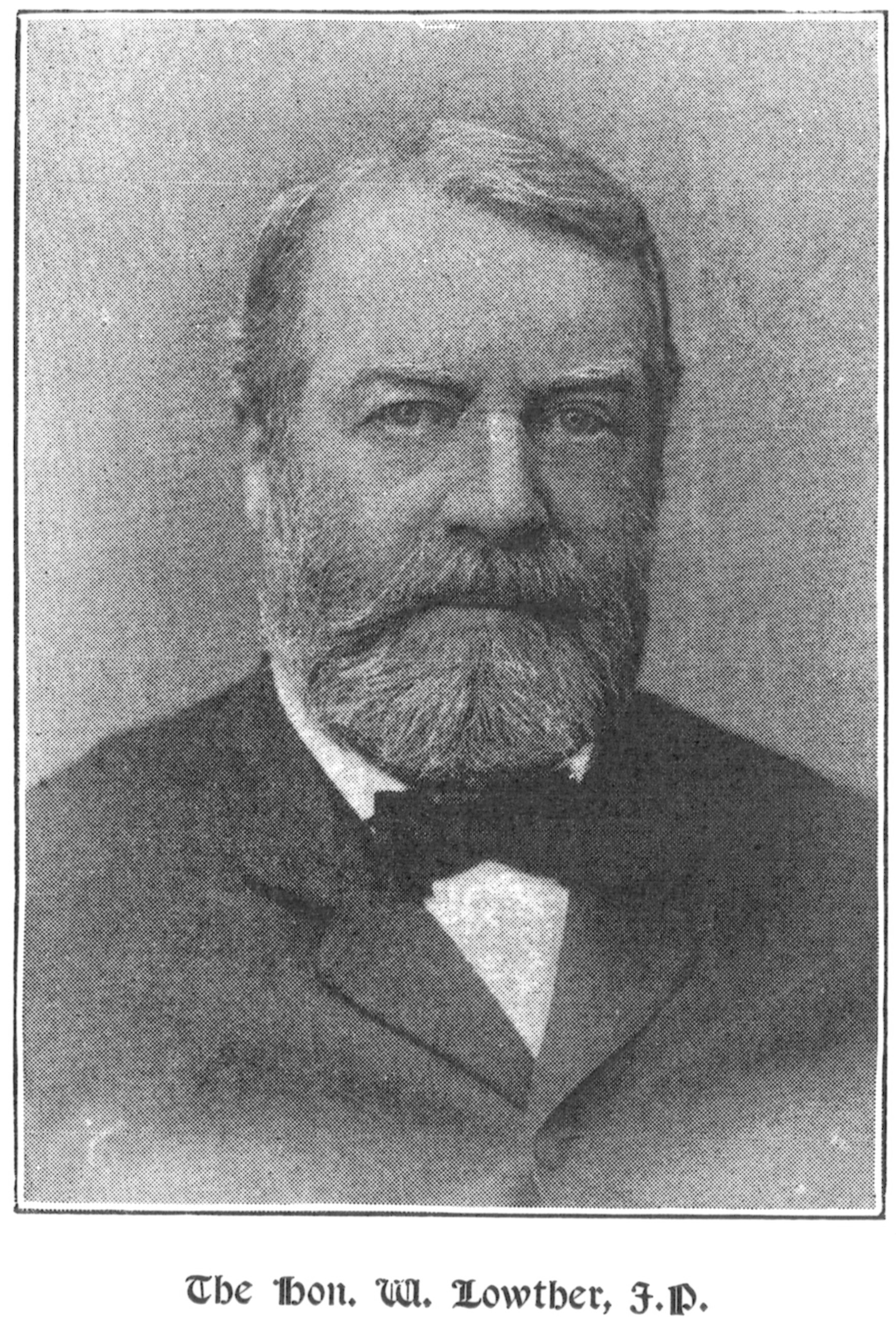
- Lowther, pictured in Suffolk Celebrities, 1893.

Member of Parliament for Appleby
- In office 1885–1892
- Preceded by: New constituency
- Succeeded by: Sir Joseph Savory, Bt

Member of Parliament for Westmorland
- In office 1868–1885 Serving with Earl of Bective, Earl of Bective
- Preceded by: Henry Lowther; Earl of Bective
- Succeeded by: Constituency abolished

British Minister Plenipotentiary to the Argentine Republic
- In office 1867–1868
- Preceded by: George Buckley Mathew
- Succeeded by: William Stuart

Personal details
- Born: 14 December 1821
- Died: 23 January 1912 (aged 90)
- Party: Conservative
- Spouse: Hon. Alice Parke (m. 1853; died 1908)
- Relations: Henry Lowther, 3rd Earl of Lonsdale (brother); Philip Sherard, 5th Earl of Harborough (grandfather)
- Children: 7, including James, Gerard, Henry
- Parent(s): Hon. Henry Lowther; Lady Lucy Eleanor Sherard
- Education: Magdalene College, Cambridge

William Lowther JP DL (14 December 1821 – 23 January 1912) was a British diplomat and Conservative politician who sat in the House of Commons from 1868 to 1892.

== Early life ==
Lowther was the third, but second surviving, son of the Hon. Henry Cecil Lowther and his wife Lady Lucy Eleanor. Among his siblings were brother Henry Lowther, 3rd Earl of Lonsdale and sister Augusta Mary Lowther (wife of Hon. Gerard Noel, a son of Charles Noel, 1st Earl of Gainsborough). His father, a longtime MP for Westmorland, was Father of the House of Commons from 1862 until his death in 1867.

His paternal grandparents were William Lowther, 1st Earl of Lonsdale and the former Lady Augusta Fane (eldest daughter of John Fane, 9th Earl of Westmorland and, his first wife, Augusta Bertie, a granddaughter of Robert Bertie, 1st Duke of Ancaster and Kesteven). His maternal grandparents were Philip Sherard, 5th Earl of Harborough and the former Eleanor Monckton (second daughter and co-heiress of Col. Hon. John Monckton of Fineshade Abbey, eldest son, by his second wife, of John Monckton, 1st Viscount Galway).

He was educated privately and at Magdalene College, Cambridge.

== Career ==
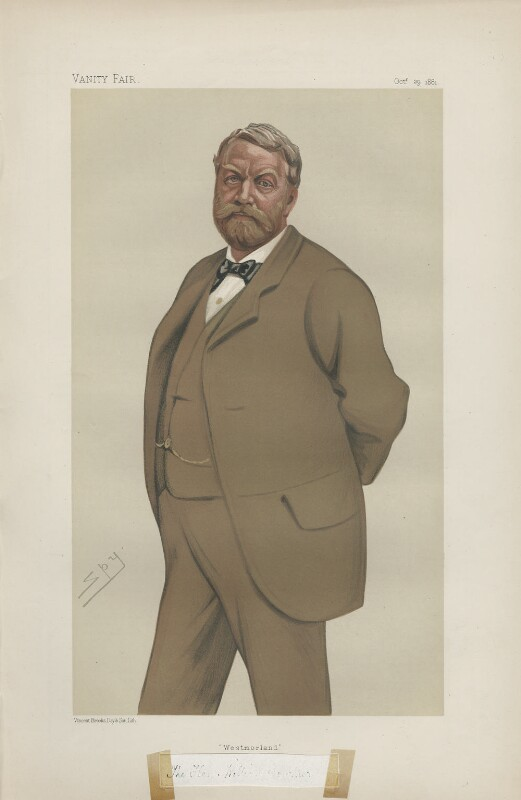
"Westmorland" Lowther as caricatured by Spy (Leslie Ward) in Vanity Fair, October 1881

Lowther entered the diplomatic service, and was an unpaid Attaché to the British embassy in Berlin from 1841 to 1846 and then a paid Attaché at the Berlin Embassy from 1846 to 1852. He was Secretary of the Legation at Naples from 1852 to 1858, at St Petersburg from 1858 to 1859 and at Berlin from 1859 to 1861. He was Secretary of the Embassy at Berlin from 1861 to 1867 and finally Minister to Argentina at Buenos Aires from 1867 to 1868.

After his return from Argentina, Lowther decided to build a new house in London. He bought land in South Kensington immediately south of Hyde Park, and there erected Lowther Lodge, an exemplar of Queen Anne Style architecture. The cost was partly defrayed by a bequest from his uncle William Lowther, 2nd Earl of Lonsdale, who died unmarried, and without legitimate issue, in 1872 and was succeeded by Lowther's elder brother, Henry. In 1873, he was granted the style and precedence of the younger son of an Earl by Royal Warrant. He was a J.P. and a Deputy Lieutenant for Westmoreland and Cumberland and a J.P. for Bedfordshire and Suffolk. He was a director of the London and North Western Railway. In 1883, Lowther bought Ashe High House in Campsea Ashe, which had 31 bedrooms and dressing rooms, six bathrooms, six reception rooms and a library, from the Sheppard family who owned the estate since 1652.

At the 1868 general election Lowther was elected Member of Parliament for Westmorland. He held the seat until 1885 when it was divided under the Redistribution of Seats Act 1885. He was then elected MP for Appleby. He held the seat until 1892 when he was succeeded by Sir Joseph Savory, Bt.

== Personal life ==
On 17 December 1853, Lowther was married to the Hon. Charlotte Alice Parke (d. 1908), third daughter and co-heiress of James Parke, 1st Baron Wensleydale of Walton and the former and Cecilia Arabella Frances Barlow. They had seven children including:

- James William Lowther, 1st Viscount Ullswater (1855–1949), the Speaker of the House of Commons who married Mary Beresford-Hope, daughter of Sir Alexander Beresford-Hope and Lady Mildred Gascoyne-Cecil (daughter of James Gascoyne-Cecil, 2nd Marquess of Salisbury), in 1886.
- Mary Eleanor Rose Lowther (1856–1929), who married Paul Vicugue in 1897.
- Sir Gerard Augustus Lowther, 1st Baronet (1858–1916), the British Ambassador to the Ottoman Empire who married Alice Blight, daughter of Atherton Blight, in 1905.
- Mildred Alice Lowther (1860–1876), who died unmarried at age sixteen.
- Mabel Cecily Lowther (c. 1862–1948), who married James Bey, son of Elias Pasha Bey, in 1912.
- Harold Arthur Lowther (1864–1929), a Lieutenant in the 3rd Battalion, Bedfordshire regiment. He was killed in a riding accident.
- Sir Henry Cecil Lowther (1869–1940), an MP for Appleby and Penrith and Cockermouth who married Dorothy (née Harvey) Bois, a widow of Gordon Bois and daughter of John Selwyn Harvey, in 1920.

Lowther and his wife lived at Lowther Lodge until his death in 1912. Their son Lord Ullswater sold it to the Royal Geographical Society shortly thereafter.

Parliament of the United Kingdom
Preceded by Henry Lowther; Earl of Bective	Member of Parliament for Westmorland; 1868–1885; With: Earl of Bective 1868–1870; Earl of Bective 1871–1885	Constituency abolished
New constituency	Member of Parliament for Appleby; 1885–1892	Succeeded by Sir Joseph Savory, Bt
Diplomatic posts
Preceded by George Buckley Mathew	Minister Plenipotentiary to the Argentine Republic; 1867–1868	Succeeded by William Stuart
