= Thomas Kennedy (RAF officer) =

Royal Air Force Air Chief Marshal (1928-2013)

Sir Thomas Lawrie Kennedy GCB, AFC & Bar, DL
- Born: 19 May 1928; Hawick, Scotland
- Died: 18 November 2013 (aged 85)
- Spouse: Margaret Ann Parker (m. 1959–2013)
- Children: three
- Military career
- Allegiance: Monarch of the United Kingdom
- Service branch: Royal Air Force
- Service years: 1946–1986
- RAF rank: Air Chief Marshal
- Nickname: Jock
- Commands: Air Member for Personnel (1983–1986); Royal Air Force Germany (1981–83); RAF Brize Norton (1970–1971); No. 99 Squadron (1965–1967)
- Conflicts: Berlin Airlift; Korean War; Suez Crisis
- Awards: Knight Grand Cross of the Order of the Bath; Air Force Cross & Bar
- Other work: Controller RAF Benevolent Fund (1988–1993); Deputy Lieutenant of Leicestershire; Lord Lieutenant of Rutland

Air Chief Marshal Sir Thomas Lawrie 'Jock' Kennedy, GCB, AFC & Bar, DL (19 May 1928 – 18 November 2013 (aged 85)) was a senior Royal Air Force (RAF) officer. He served as Deputy Commander of RAF Strike Command from 1979 to 1981, and Air Member for Personnel from 1983 to 1986. Following his retirement from the military, he served as Lord Lieutenant of Rutland.

== Early life ==
Kennedy was born on 19 May 1928 in Hawick, Roxburghshire, Scotland. He was educated at Hawick High School. He was a member of the Boy Scouts.

== Military career ==
In April 1946, Kennedy enlisted in the Royal Air Force (RAF) as an airman as part of his National Service. He served for six months before being selected for officer training. Having attended Royal Air Force College Cranwell, he was commissioned on 8 April 1949 as a pilot officer. He was awarded the Philip Sassoon Memorial Trophy for best all-round cadet at Cranwell. He was promoted to flying officer on 9 April 1950 with seniority from 8 April 1949, and to flight lieutenant on 8 October 1951. In the 1953 Coronation Honours, Kennedy was awarded the Air Force Cross (AFC).

Kennedy was appointed Deputy Commandant of the RAF Staff College, Bracknell in 1971, Director of Air Support Operations in 1973, and Air Officer Commanding Northern Maritime Air Region at RAF Pitreavie Castle in 1977. He went on to be Deputy Commander-in-Chief, RAF Strike Command in 1979, and was appointed to the combined posts of Commander-in-Chief Royal Air Force Germany and Commander Second Tactical Air Force in 1981. His last appointment was as Air Member for Personnel in 1983, before retiring in 1986.

== Later life ==
In retirement from the military, Kennedy became a Director of Dowty Group. He served as controller of the RAF Benevolent Fund from 1988 to 1993, during which time more than £20 million was raised.

He served as Deputy Lieutenant of Leicestershire, and later became Lord Lieutenant of Rutland.

He died on 18 November 2013.

== Personal life ==
In 1959, Kennedy married Margaret Ann Parker. Together they had three children: one son and two daughters.

Military offices
Preceded by Sir Robert Freer	Deputy Commander-in-Chief RAF Strike Command; 1979–1981	Succeeded by Sir Peter Bairsto
Preceded by Sir Peter Terry	Commander-in-Chief RAF Germany; Also Commander of the Second Tactical Air Force; 1981–1983	Succeeded by Sir Patrick Hine
Preceded by Sir Charles Ness	Air Member for Personnel; 1983–1986	Succeeded by Sir Anthony Skingsley
