= St Mary Magdalene's Church, Stapleford =

Coordinates: 52.7553°N 0.7987°W

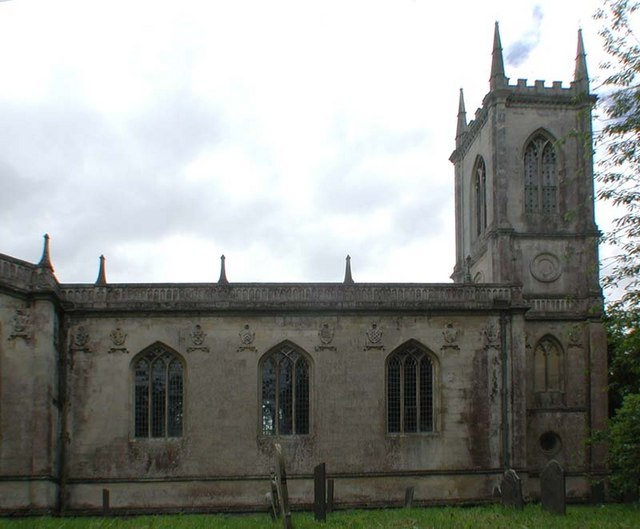
- St Mary Magalene's Church, Stapleford,

- Location in Leicestershire
- OS grid reference: SK 81172 18203
- Location: Stapleford Park, Leicestershire
- Country: England
- Denomination: Anglican
- Website: Churches Conservation Trust

History
- Founder: Robert Sherard, 4th Earl of Harborough
- Dedication: Saint Mary Magdalene

Architecture
- Functional status: Redundant
- Heritage designation: Grade I
- Designated: 1 January 1968
- Architect: George Richardson
- Architectural type: Church
- Style: Gothic Revival
- Completed: 1783

Specifications
- Materials: Limestone

St Mary Magdalene's Church is a redundant Anglican church near the village of Stapleford, Leicestershire, England. It is recorded in the National Heritage List for England as a designated Grade I listed building, and is under the care of the Churches Conservation Trust. It is situated in the grounds of Stapleford Park.

== History ==
The church was built in 1783, having been designed by George Richardson for Robert Sherard, 4th Earl of Harborough. It replaced an earlier church on the site, and functioned as the Sherard family estate church as well as a parish church. Restorations were carried out in 1931 and 1967.

== Architecture ==
=== Exterior ===
St Mary's is constructed in limestone ashlar, and is in Gothic Revival style. Its plan consists of a three-bay nave, north and south transepts, a chancel and a west tower containing a porch. The tower is in three stages on a moulded plinth, with string courses, a frieze, and cornices, one of which is carved with Romanesque-style decoration. The parapet is embattled and there are pinnacles at the corners. In the lowest stage is a doorway with a Tudor arch, above which is a two-light window with a pointed arch and Y-tracery. There are similar windows on the north and south sides of the tower, each with a recessed round window below it. The middle stage has a roundel on each side, the one on the west containing a clock face. In the top stage are double lancet bell openings. On each side of the nave are three three-light windows with pointed arches, and at the west end there is on each side a niche above a roundel. The transepts have parapets, and a blank four-light lancet window in each gable. The side walls of the chancel are blank, and at the east end is a four-light lancet window with transoms, on each side of which is a niche. Over the east window is a coronet carved in high relief, and a datestone inscribed with "1783". Around the exterior of the church are carved heraldic shields containing arms of the families married to the Sherards.

In the churchyard are buried the Barons Gretton and Lieutenant-Colonel Frederick Eveleigh-de-Moleyns, 5th Baron Ventry, a British Army officer and Anglo-Irish peer.

=== Interior ===
The porch in the tower has an octagonal vault containing a central carved boss. The nave has a plaster coved ceiling, with an arcaded cornice, fluted brackets, and is decorated with a lozenge pattern. At the west end is a wooden gallery with a panelled dado. In the west wall of the gallery is a Coade stone fireplace, above which are the Royal arms on a roundel. The ceiling again is decorated with lozenges, and it contains a central oval dome decorated with putti. On the north and south walls of the transepts are roundels containing depictions of doves. At the east end of the chancel is a dado and a frieze, and a central marble reredos, inlaid with the motif of an anchor, and surmounted by a pediment and an urn. On each side of the east window are double lancet Commandment boards. The stalls are arranged along the north and south sides of the nave. The pulpit is octagonal and panelled, and the font consists of a marble bowl on an oak stem.

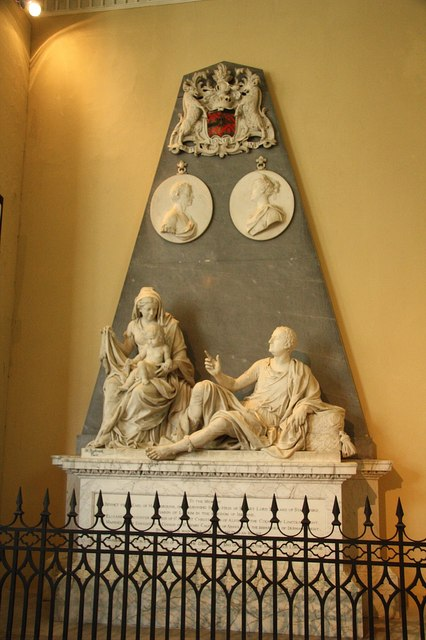
The first Earl and his wife and child. By Rysbrack

Most of the memorials were moved from the earlier church. The oldest, dated 1490, is a brass to Geoffrey Sherard and his wife. There is a black and white marble tomb chest dated 1640. The chest bears two life-size reclining effigies and is carved with images of eleven children. There are a number of busts of members of the Sherard family. The finest memorial is that of the 1st Earl by John Michael Rysbrack. It is dated 1732 and consists of a seated woman with a child, and a half-reclining man, all in Roman clothing. There is also a memorial tablet and a hatchment to the 6th Earl, dated 1859. There is a memorial to the businessman, Conservative politician and Olympic gold medalist John Gretton, 1st Baron Gretton, in the church too.

=== See also ===
- Holy Trinity Church, Teigh
