= Philip Sherard, 5th Earl of Harborough =

British politician (1767–1807)

The Right Honourable The Earl of Harborough DL

Member of Parliament for Rutland
- In office 1795–1796 Serving with Gerard Edwardes
- Preceded by: Gerard Edwardes; John Heathcote
- Succeeded by: Gerard Edwardes; Sir William Lowther

Personal details
- Born: Philip Sherard; 10 October 1767
- Died: 10 December 1807 (aged 40)
- Spouse: Eleanor Monckton (m. 1791)
- Children: 8
- Parent(s): Robert Sherard, 4th Earl of Harborough; Jane Reeve
- Education: Harrow School
- Alma mater: Clare College, Cambridge

Philip Sherard, 5th Earl of Harborough (10 October 1767 – 10 December 1807), styled Lord Sherard from 1770 to 1799, was a British peer and politician.

== Early life ==
Sherard was the eldest son of Robert Sherard, 4th Earl of Harborough and his wife Jane Reeve.

He was educated at Harrow School in 1780 and Clare College, Cambridge in 1786.

== Career ==
Upon the death of John Heathcote in 1795, Lord Sherard was chosen by the Earls of Exeter and Gainsborough as a suitable representative for Rutland. (Gainsborough's interest was represented by his first cousin Gerard Edwardes; Exeter lacked suitable relatives to occupy the seat.) Sherard's father had a minor electoral interest in Rutland, and Sir Gilbert Heathcote, 4th Baronet, who was also interested in the position, was in any case debarred that year by being High Sheriff of Rutland. Sherard was not active in Parliament and stood down at the 1796 British general election; Heathcote took a seat at Lincolnshire, while Sir William Lowther stood together with Edwardes. On 26 February 1797, he was appointed a deputy lieutenant of Leicestershire.

Philip became Earl of Harborough in 1799 in succession to his father, but was no more conspicuous in the Lords than he had been in the Commons.

== Personal life ==
On 4 July 1791, Sherard married Eleanor Monckton (1772–1809), daughter of Col. Hon. John Monckton of Fineshade Abbey and granddaughter of John Monckton, 1st Viscount Galway. They had one son and six daughters, including:

- Lady Lucy Eleanor Sherard (1792–1848), who married Henry Lowther, the second son of William Lowther, 1st Earl of Lonsdale, in 1817.
- Lady Anna Maria Sherard (1794–1848), who married William Cuffe in 1818.
- Lady Sophia Sherard (1795–1851), who married Sir Thomas Whichcote, 6th Baronet in 1812 and subsequently William Evans-Freke, 8th Baron Carbery in 1840.
- Robert Sherard, 6th Earl of Harborough (1797–1859)
- Lady Jane Sherard (1799–1856)
- Lady Charlotte Sherard (1801–1856), who became insane in 1825.
- Lady Susan Sherard (1802–1864), who married General John Reeve, of Leadenham House, in 1821.

He died in December 1807 and was succeeded by his son Robert.

=== Descendants ===
Through his daughter, Lady Lucy, he was a grandfather of seven, including Henry Lowther, 3rd Earl of Lonsdale, and diplomat William Lowther.

Parliament of Great Britain
| Preceded by Gerard Edwardes; John Heathcote | Member of Parliament for Rutland; 1795–1796; With: Gerard Edwardes | Succeeded by Gerard Edwardes; Sir William Lowther |
Peerage of Great Britain
| Preceded by Robert Sherard | Earl of Harborough; 1799–1807 | Succeeded by Robert Sherard |
