= Bennet Sherard (MP) =

English politician (1649–1701)

Bennet Sherard JP DL

Member of Parliament for Rutland
- In office 1687–1698 Serving with Sir Thomas Mackworth, Lord Burghley
- Preceded by: Baptist Noel
- Succeeded by: Richard Halford

Personal details
- Born: 24 August 1649
- Died: 1701 (aged 51–52)
- Spouse: Dorothy Fairfax Stapylton (before 1679)
- Children: 10, including Philip Sherard, 2nd Earl of Harborough
- Parent(s): Philip Sherard; Margaret Denton Eure
- Relatives: Robert Sherard, 4th Earl of Harborough (grandson)
- Education: The Queen's College, Oxford

Bennet Sherard of Whissendine JP DL (baptised 24 August 1649 – buried 30 September 1701) was an English politician who served as a Member of Parliament for Rutland.

== Early life ==
Sherard was baptised on 24 August 1649. He was the second, but eldest surviving son of Hon. Philip Sherard (1623–1695), and the former Margaret (née Denton) Eure, the widow of a son of Lord Eure and daughter of Sir Thomas Denton of Hillesden.

His father was a younger son of William Sherard, 1st Baron Sherard. His uncle was Bennet Sherard, 2nd Baron Sherard, who sat as MP for Leicestershire and served as Lord Lieutenant of Rutland. His nephew was Bennet Sherard, 1st Earl of Harborough.

He was educated at The Queen's College, Oxford, graduating in 1666.

== Career ==
Sherard was Commissioner for Assessment for Rutland from 1679 to 1680 and from 1689 to 1690, West Riding of Yorkshire and York in 1690. He served as Justice of the Peace for Rutland from 1689 until his death, Deputy Lieutenant of Rutland from 1690 until his death. He served as Captain of Militia Horse by 1697 until his death in 1701.

He succeeded to his father's estates in 1695. In 1699, he settled the manor of Hellewell on his eldest son Philip. After his death in 1701, he left him the rest of his estates.

Sherard succeeded to his father's seat (which he had long held except during James II's Parliament). Although an inactive Member of the Convention, he was appointed to nine committees and was added, along with his uncle, to the Committee of Inquiry into the delay in raising the siege of Derry. After the recess he was among those appointed to consider the bill for restoring corporations.

== Personal life ==
By 1679, Sherard was married to Dorothy (née Fairfax) Stapylton (1655–1744), the widow of Robert Stapylton of Wighill (a son of Philip Stapleton) and daughter of Henry Fairfax, 4th Lord Fairfax of Cameron and Frances Barwick (daughter of Sir Robert Barwick). Together, they were the parents of four sons and six daughters, including:

- Philip Sherard, 2nd Earl of Harborough (c. 1680–1750), who married Anne Pedley, daughter of Nicholas Pedley (son and heir of Sir Nicholas Pedley, Serjeant-at-Law).
- Margaret Sherard, who married The Most Rev. John Gilbert, Archbishop of York.

Sherard died in 1701 and was buried at St Andrew's Church, Whissendine on 30 September 1701. His son Philip sat for Rutland as a Whig from 1708 to 1710, and succeeded as the Earl of Harborough in 1732. Lady Dorothy and their son Philip are also buried at St Andrew's.

Parliament of England
Preceded by Baptist Noel	Member of Parliament for Rutland; 1687–1698	Succeeded by Richard Halford
