= Henry Lowther (politician) =

English Conservative politician and amateur cricketer

The Honourable Henry Cecil Lowther DL JP

Member of Parliament for Westmorland
- In office 1812–1867 Serving with The Lord Muncaster, Viscount Lowther, Alexander Nowell, William Thompson, Earl of Bective
- Preceded by: James Lowther; The Lord Muncaster
- Succeeded by: Earl of Bective; William Lowther

Personal details
- Born: 27 July 1790 Lowther Castle, Westmorland
- Died: 6 December 1867 (aged 77)
- Spouse: Lady Lucy Eleanor Sherard (after 1817)
- Children: 7, including Henry, William
- Parent(s): William Lowther, 1st Earl of Lonsdale; Lady Augusta Fane
- Education: Westminster School

Henry Lowther
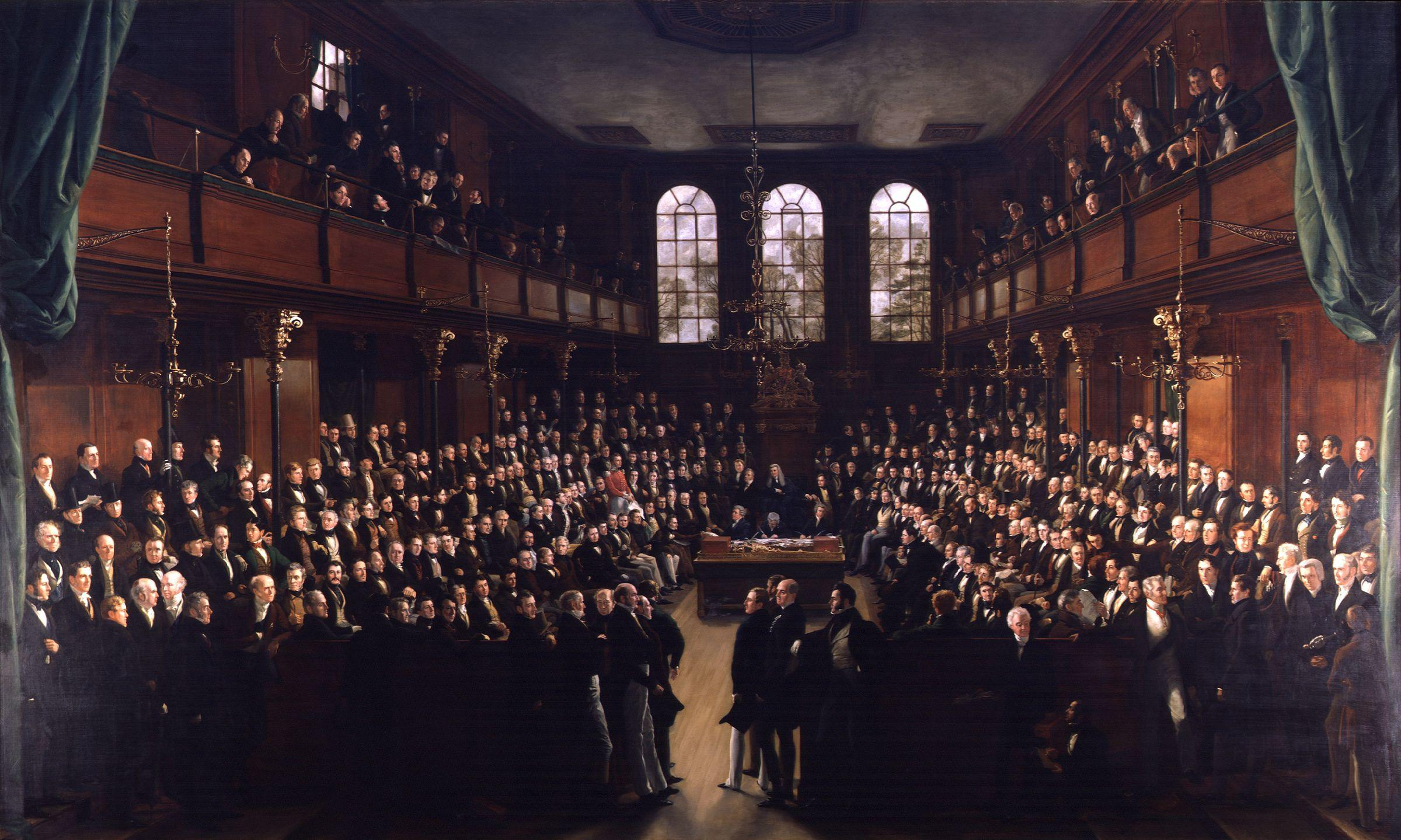

Cricket information
- Batting: Right-handed
- Bowling: Right-arm slow

Colonel Henry Cecil Lowther, DL, JP (27 July 1790 – 6 December 1867) was an English Conservative politician and an amateur cricketer who played from 1819 to 1843. His long service in the House of Commons saw him become the Father of the House.

== Early life ==
Lowther was born on 27 July 1790 at Lowther Castle, Westmorland. He was the second son of William Lowther, 1st Earl of Lonsdale, and his wife Lady Augusta (née Fane) (eldest daughter of John Fane, 9th Earl of Westmorland and, his first wife, Augusta Bertie, a granddaughter of Robert Bertie, 1st Duke of Ancaster and Kesteven).

Lowther was Educated at Westminster School

== Career ==
He entered the army on 16 July 1807 as a cornet in the 7th Hussars. He was promoted lieutenant on 21 July 1808 and captain on 4 October 1810. He served with the 7th Hussars during the campaign of 1809 in Spain, including the battles of Mayorga, Sahagún, Benevente, and the retreat to Corunna. From 1812 until 1814, he was in Wellington's army during the Peninsular War, and was made a major in the 10th Hussars on 12 November 1815. He received the Peninsular Medal with three clasps after the war. On 20 April 1817 he went into the 12th Regiment of Foot as a lieutenant-colonel, with which rank he retired on half-pay. In 1830, he transferred to the 44th Foot. He raised six part-time Troops of Westmorland Yeomanry Cavalry across Westmorland and Cumberland at his own expense in 1819 and commanded them until he was appointed colonel of the Royal Cumberland Militia in 1830.

=== Political career ===
First elected in 1812 for Westmorland, a constituency long in the family interest, he continued to be returned until his death on 6 December 1867 at Barleythorpe Hall, Rutland. In 1862, he became Father of the House. He was the last MP elected during the reign of George III.

=== Cricket career ===
Between 1818 and 1839, Lowther played cricket in 47 historically important matches. A right-handed batsman and right arm slow roundarm bowler, he played most frequently for Marylebone Cricket Club (MCC). He played for the Gentlemen in the Gentlemen v Players series, and also played once for both Hampshire and Surrey.

== Personal life ==
On 19 May 1817, Lowther was married to Lady Lucy Eleanor Sherard, daughter of Philip Sherard, 5th Earl of Harborough and the former Eleanor Monckton (second daughter and co-heiress of Col. Hon. John Monckton of Fineshade Abbey, eldest son, by his second wife, of John Monckton, 1st Viscount Galway). Together, they were the parents of seven children, three sons and four daughters, including:

- Lady Eleanor Cecily Lowther (d. 1894), who married John Talbot Clifton, eldest son and heir of Thomas Clifton of Clifton Hall and Lytham Hall, in 1844.
- Lady Augusta Mary Lowther (d. 1916), who married the Hon. Gerard Noel, a son of Charles Noel, 1st Earl of Gainsborough.
- Henry Lowther, 3rd Earl of Lonsdale (1818–1876), who married Emily Susan Caulfeild, the daughter of St George Caulfeild of Donamon Castle.
- Arthur Lowther (1820–1855), who died unmarried.
- William Lowther (1821–1912), who married Hon. Charlotte Alice Parke, third daughter and co-heiress of James Parke, 1st Baron Wensleydale, in 1853.
- Constantia Lowther (1831–1864), who married Maj.-Gen. Robert Blücher Wood, fifth son of Col. Thomas Wood and wife Lady Caroline Stewart (a daughter of Robert Stewart, 1st Marquess of Londonderry) in 1850.

Lady Lucy died 8 June 1848. Lowther died on 6 December 1867. In 1873, his children were granted the style and precedence of the younger son of an Earl by Royal Warrant.

== Notes ==
Parliament of the United Kingdom
Preceded by James Lowther; The Lord Muncaster	Member of Parliament for Westmorland; 1812–1867; With: The Lord Muncaster 1812–1813; Viscount Lowther 1813–1831, 1832–1841; Alexander Nowell 1831–1832; William Thompson 1841–1854; Earl of Bective 1854–1867	Succeeded by Earl of Bective; William Lowther
Preceded by Sir Charles Burrell	Father of the House of Commons; 1862–1867	Succeeded by Thomas Peers Williams
