= Earl of Harborough =

Earldom in the Peerage of Great Britain

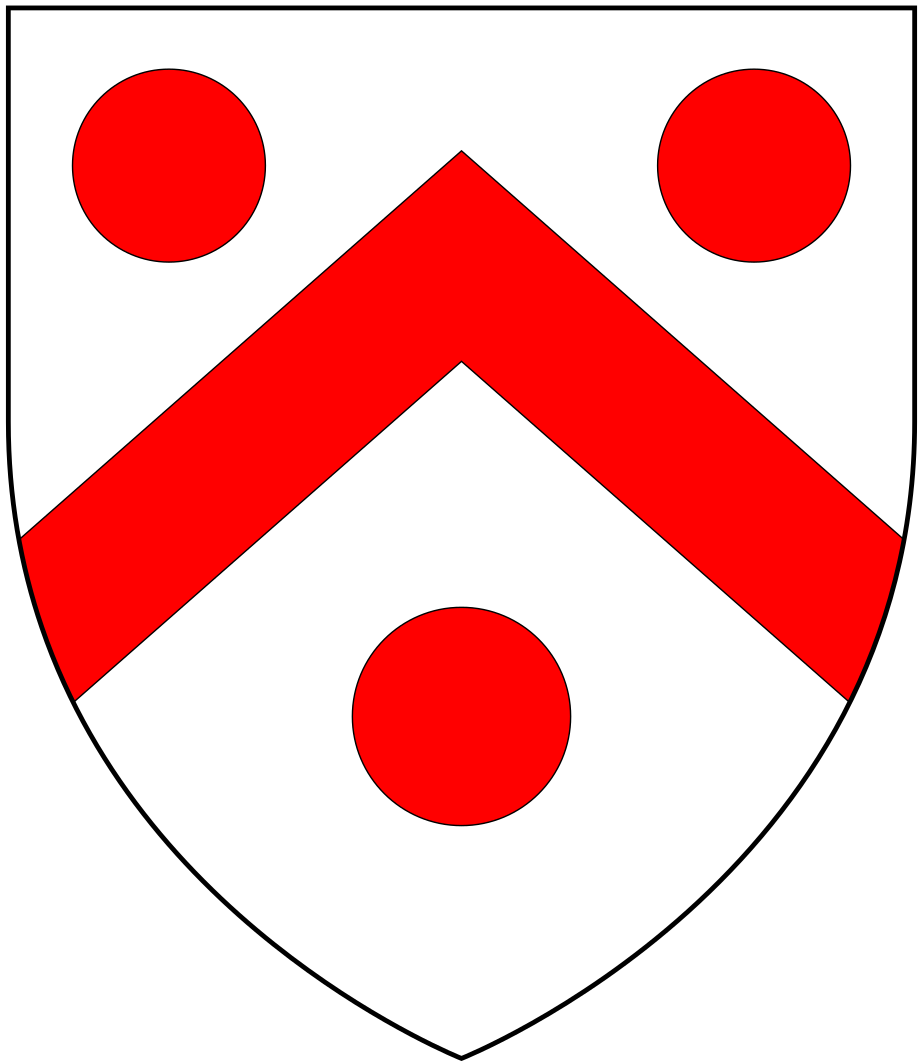
Arms of Sherard: Argent, a chevron gules between three torteaux

The Earldom of Harborough was a title in the Peerage of Great Britain created in 1719 for Bennet Sherard, who had previously been made Baron Harborough (1714) and Viscount Sherard, with the viscountcy ending with the death of its original holder in 1732, but the other titles, created with special remainders to the grantee's cousin, persisted until 1859.

The Sherard of Stapleford, Leicestershire, had been High Sheriffs of Rutland in the 15th and 16th centuries, and in 1627 were made Barons Sherard in the Peerage of Ireland. Bennet Sherard, 3rd Baron Sherard, served as Lord Lieutenant of Rutland and represented both Leicestershire as Member of Parliament. He was made Baron Harborough in 1714, with special remainder to his first cousin once removed, Philip Sherard, grandson Bennet Sherard's uncle, Philip Sherard. In 1718, Baron Harborough became Viscount Sherard, of Stapleford, Leicester, and the next year he was made Earl of Harborough. Like the Harborough barony, the Earldom was created with remainder to his cousin and heir male, Philip Sherard. When the Earl of Harborough died in 1732, his titles devolved on his cousin, while the viscountcy, created without remainder, became extinct.

Philip Sherard, 2nd Earl, also served as Lord-Lieutenant of Rutland and had represented that county in Parliament, dying in 1750. After the deaths of his two sons, Bennet Sherard, 3rd Earl of Harborough, who died in 1770, and his brother Robert Sherard, 4th Earl of Harborough in 1799, Robert's son Philip Sherard, 5th Earl of Harborough succeeded, followed by his son Robert Sherard, the 6th and last Earl of Harborough and Baron Harborough. Though he was father of three illegitimate sons by the actress and opera singer Emma Sarah Love Calcraft Kennedy (1801-1881), including artist Edward Sherard Calcraft Kennedy (1833-1900) and Reverend Bennet Sherard Calcraft Kennedy, father of author and journalist Robert Sherard, he died without legitimate issue from his marriage to Mary Eliza Temple (1818- ) and the Earldom and Harborough barony went extinct.

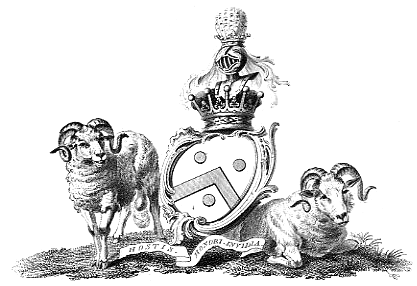
Arms of Sherard

== Earls of Harborough (1719) and Barons Harborough (1714) ==
- Bennet Sherard, 1st Earl of Harborough, Viscount Sherard and Baron Harborough (1675–1732)
- Philip Sherard, 2nd Earl of Harborough and Baron Harborough (1680–1750)
- Bennet Sherard, 3rd Earl of Harborough and Baron Harborough (1709–1770)
- Robert Sherard, 4th Earl of Harborough and Baron Harborough (1719–1799)
- Philip Sherard, 5th Earl of Harborough and Baron Harborough (1767–1807)
- Robert Sherard, 6th Earl of Harborough and Baron Harborough (1797–1859)

== Viscount Sherard (1718) ==
- Bennet Sherard, 1st Earl of Harborough, Viscount Sherard and Baron Harborough (1675–1732)
