= Augusta Fane (1761–1838) =

Countess of Lonsdale

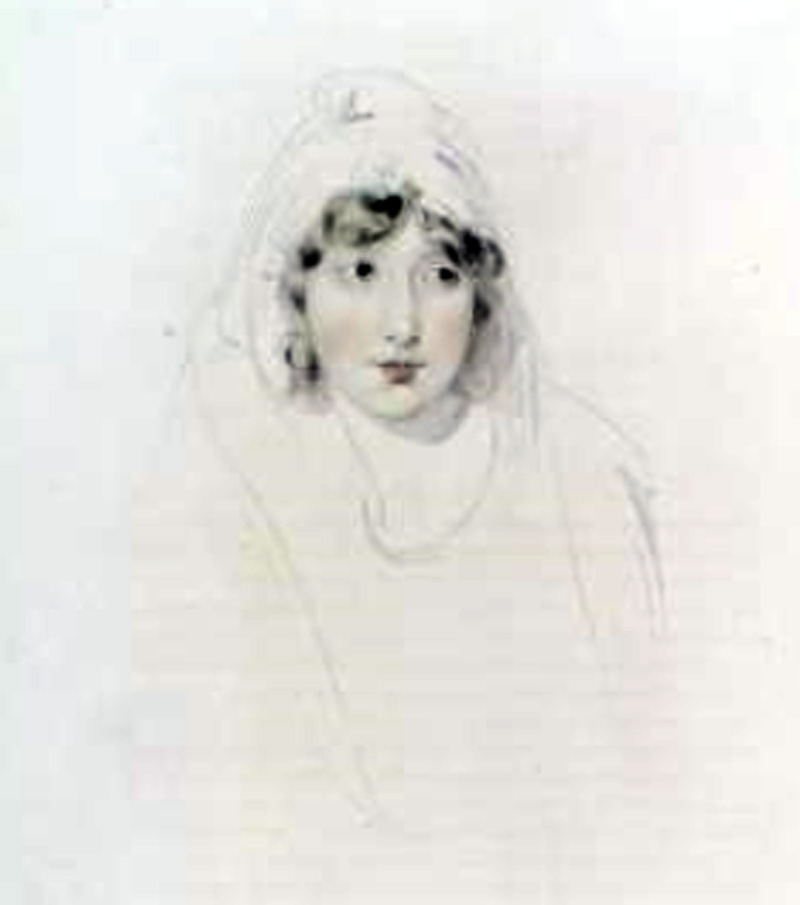
Augusta Countess of Lonsdale after Sir Thomas Lawrence (1837)

Lady Augusta Fane (18 September 1761 – 6 March 1838) was the daughter of John Fane, 9th Earl of Westmorland (5 May 1728 – 25 April 1774) and Augusta Bertie. She was born at Brympton House near Yeovil. Her brother was John Fane, 10th Earl of Westmorland.

She married William Lowther, 1st Earl of Lonsdale, KG (29 December 1757 – 19 March 1844) and thus became styled as Countess of Lonsdale. They lived in Westmorland at Lowther Castle where the Countess's visitors included the poet Robert Southey.

An 1837 portrait of her, which hangs in the National Portrait Gallery, London, is attributed as "after" Sir Thomas Lawrence.
