= Robert Sherard =

English writer and journalist

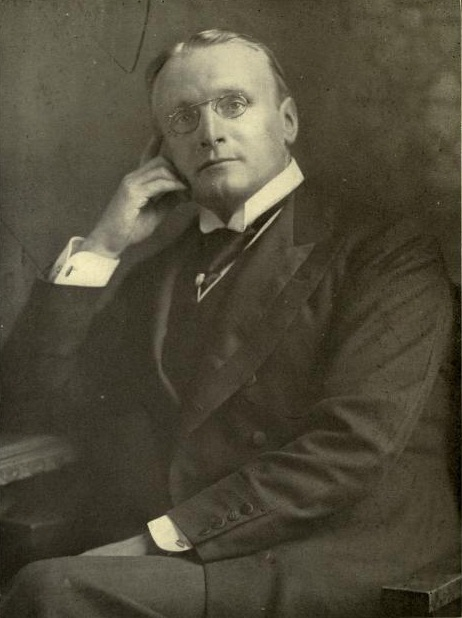
- Born: Robert Harborough Sherard Kennedy; 3 December 1861; Putney, London
- Died: 30 January 1943 (aged 81); Ealing, London
- Education: Elizabeth College, Guernsey
- Alma mater: University of Oxford; University of Bonn
- Spouses: Marthe Lipska (m. 1887; div. 1906) Irene Osgood (m. 1908; div. 1915) Alice Muriel Fiddian (after 1928)
- Parent(s): Bennet Sherard Calcraft Kennedy; Jane Stanley Wordsworth
- Relatives: Robert Sherard, 6th Earl of Harborough (grandfather); William Wordsworth (great-grandfather)

Robert Harborough Sherard (3 December 1861 – 30 January 1943) was an English writer and journalist. He was a friend, and the first biographer, of Oscar Wilde, as well as being Wilde's most prolific biographer in the first half of the twentieth century.

== Early life ==
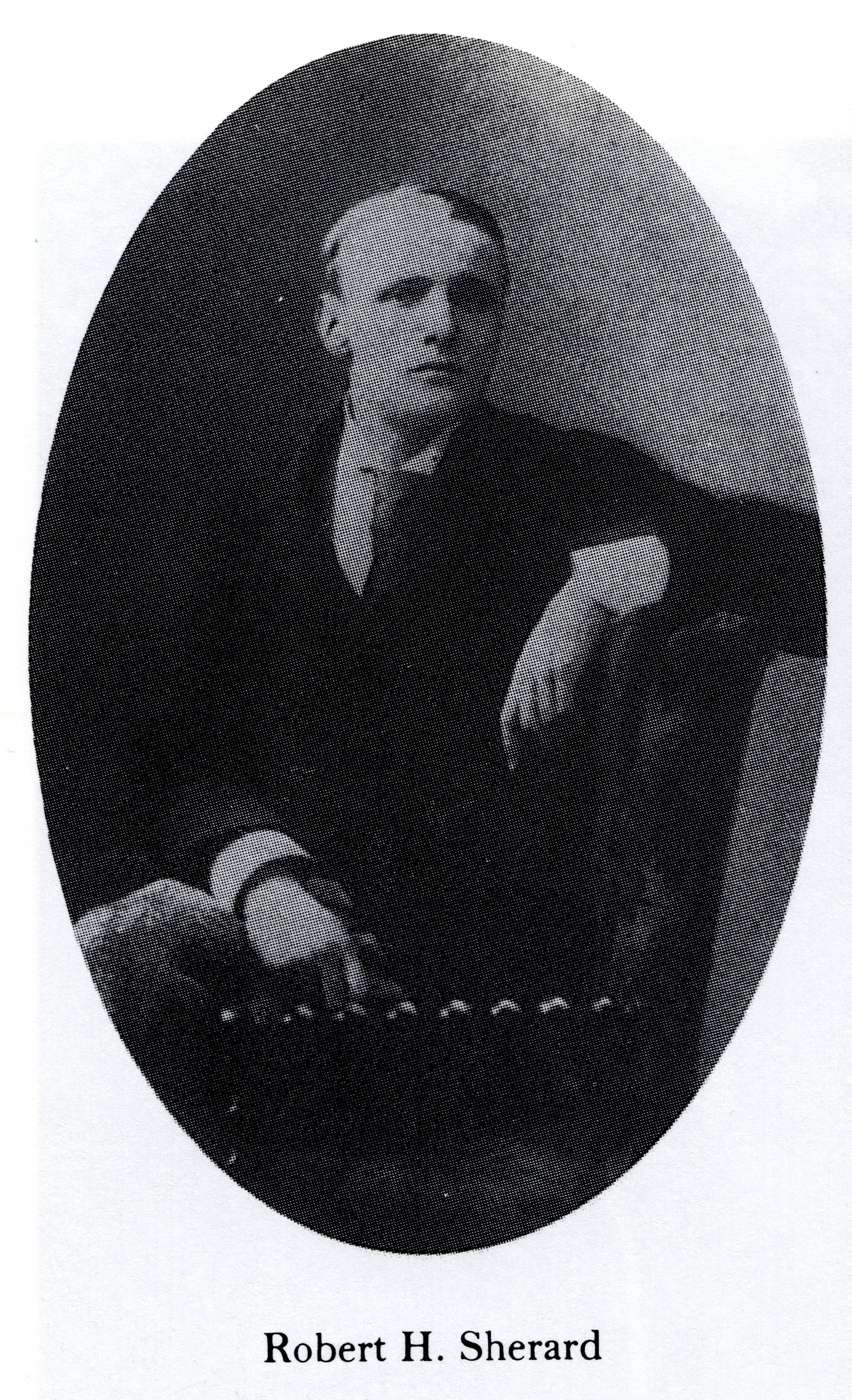
Robert H. Sherard

Born on 3 December 1861 at Putney, London, England, Sherard began life as Robert Harborough Sherard Kennedy and was the son of the Reverend Bennet Sherard Calcraft Kennedy (an illegitimate son of Robert Sherard, 6th Earl of Harborough by the actress Emma Love). His mother was Jane Stanley Wordsworth, a granddaughter of the poet William Wordsworth. He dropped the surname Kennedy upon moving to Paris in late 1882 after a quarrel with his father, who cut him off from the expected family inheritance.

Sherard was educated at Elizabeth College, Guernsey, the University of Oxford and the University of Bonn.

== Career ==
Sherard wrote about the effects of immigration into England and his articles have been described as xenophobic and antisemitic. Whilst he was an "outspoken anti-semitic observer of 'social problems'", he denied he was motivated by hatred of Jews.

== Personal life ==
Sherard married three times. In 1887 he married Marthe Lipska, a daughter of the Baron de Stern. They divorced in 1906 and he married the American novelist, poet and dramatist, Irene Osgood in 1908. They divorced in 1915, and he married Alice Muriel Fiddian in 1928.

He died in Ealing in west London in January 1943, aged 81.

== Works ==
=== Biographies ===
- Émile Zola: A Biographical and Critical Study. London: Chatto & Windus, 1893.
- Alphonse Daudet: a biographical and critical study (1894)
- My First Voyage, My First Lie (1901) in collaboration with Alphonse Daudet
- Oscar Wilde: The Story of an Unhappy Friendship. The Hermes Press, 1902.
- The Life of Oscar Wilde. London: T. Werner Laurie, 1906.
- The Real Oscar Wilde: To be used as a Supplement to, and in Illustration of "The Life of Oscar Wilde". London: T. Werner Laurie, 1917.
- The Life and Evil Fate of Guy de Maupassant (1926)
- Oscar Wilde Twice Defended from André Gide's Wicked Lies and Frank Harris's Cruel Libels; to Which Is Added a Reply to George Bernard Shaw, a Refutation of Dr G.J. Renier's Statements, a Letter to the Author from Lord Alfred Douglas and an Interview with Bernard Shaw by Hugh Kingsmill. Chicago: Argus Book Shop, 1934.
- Bernard Shaw, Frank Harris and Oscar Wilde. New York: Greystone Press, 1937.

=== Novels ===
- A Bartered Honour (1883)
- The American Marquis (1888)
- Rogues (1889)
- Agatha's Quest (1890)
- By Right Not Law (1891)
- The Typewritten Letter (1891)
- Jacob Niemand (1895)
- The Iron Cross (1897)
- Wolves: An Old Story Retold (1904)
- After the Fault (1906)

=== Poetry ===
Whispers (1884)

=== Non-fiction ===
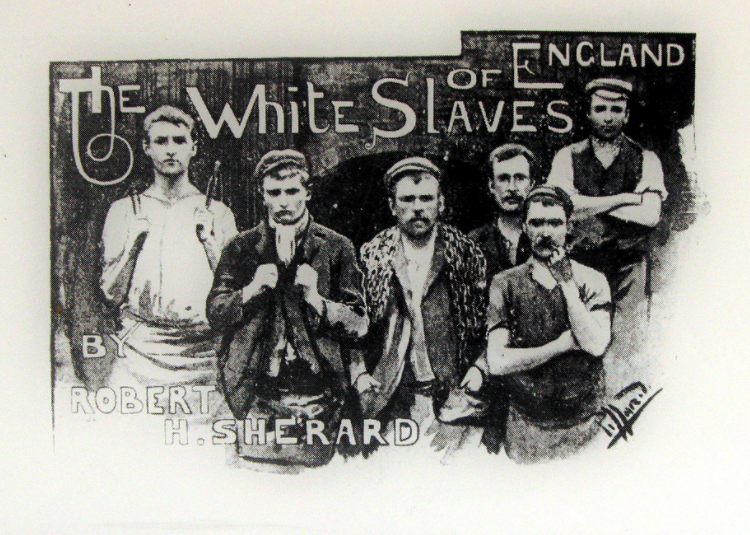
Picture of Chain makers in Cradley Heath by Harold H. Piffard to illustrate original article which appeared in Pearson's Magazine

- The White Slaves of England (1897) (originally serialised in Pearson's Magazine)
- The Cry of the Poor (1901)
- The Closed Door (1902)
- The Child Slaves of Britain (1905)
- Modern Paris: Some Sidelights on Its Inner Life. London: T. Werner Laurie, 1912.

=== Autobiography ===
- Oscar Wilde: The Story of an Unhappy Friendship. London: privately printed, 1902. London: Greening & Co., 1905.
- Twenty Years in Paris: Being Some Recollections of a Literary Life. London: Hutchinson & Co., 1905.

=== Papers ===
- University of Reading (Reading, UK) (Papers purchased 1 February 1964 from Rupert Hart-Davis).

== In popular culture ==
- Sherard is a character in the Oscar Wilde Mystery series written by Gyles Brandreth.
