= Lord Charles Manners (British Army officer, died 1761) =

British Army general

Major-General Lord Charles Manners (died 5 December 1761) was a British soldier, the ninth and youngest son of John Manners, 2nd Duke of Rutland.

== Military career ==
He served as an officer in the 3rd Foot Guards. He was appointed a captain in the regiment on 4 June 1745. He was issued a warrant to raise and organise a regiment of infantry in December 1755, and appointed to its colonelcy shortly before the end of the year. This was the 58th Regiment of Foot, shortly thereafter renumbered the 56th Regiment of Foot.

He was appointed major-general on 15 September 1759, and died in 1761.

Military offices
| Preceded by None | Colonel of the 56th Regiment of Foot; 1755-1761 | Succeeded by William Keppel |
