= Stapleford, Leicestershire =

Village in Leicestershire, England

Coordinates: 52.7572°N 0.7989°W

Stapleford
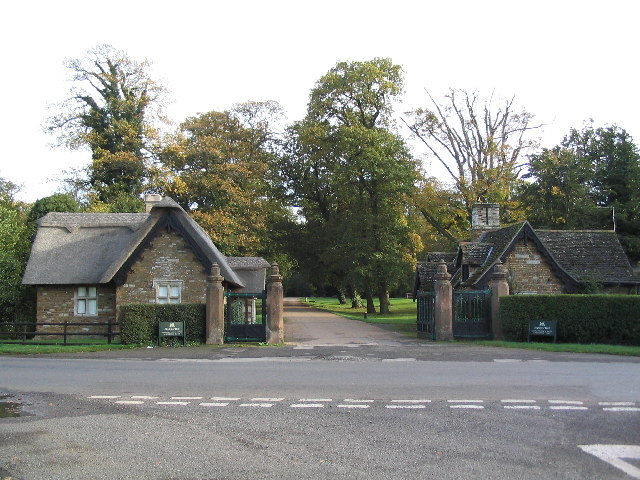
- Gatehouses at entrance to Stapleford Park photographed November 2005

- Location within Leicestershire
- Civil parish: Freeby
- District: Melton
- Shire county: Leicestershire
- Region: East Midlands
- Country: England
- Sovereign state: United Kingdom
- Post town: Melton Mowbray
- Postcode district: LE14
- Police: Leicestershire
- Fire: Leicestershire
- Ambulance: East Midlands
- UK Parliament: Melton and Syston

Stapleford is a village and former civil parish, now in the parish of Freeby, in the Melton district of Leicestershire, England, east of Melton Mowbray. It is just south of the River Eye. In 1931 the parish had a population of 145. On 1 April 1936 the parish was abolished and merged with Freeby.

The village is the site of the large Stapleford Park. The historic Stapleford Miniature Railway runs in the park. It has a church called St Mary Magdalene's Church.
