= Lord Lieutenant of Rutland =

Civil post in Rutland, England

This is a list of people who have served as Lord-Lieutenant of Rutland.

In 1974, Rutland became part of Leicestershire under the Local Government Act 1972, the Lieutenancy was abolished, with Rutland's Lord-Lieutenant becoming Lord-Lieutenant of Leicestershire.

When Rutland was restored as a unitary authority in 1997, so was its Lord Lieutenant.

The Lord-Lieutenant is supported in their duties by their Lord-Lieutenant's Cadets, chosen from local cadet units.

Since 1690, all lord-lieutenants have also been Custos Rotulorum of Rutland.

== Lord-lieutenants of Rutland ==
Lord Lieutenant	From	Until
Henry Manners, 2nd Earl of Rutland	1559	1563
Henry Hastings, 3rd Earl of Huntingdon	?	14 December 1595
George Hastings, 4th Earl of Huntingdon	2 October 1596	30 December 1604
Vacant
John Harington, 1st Baron Harington of Exton	16 May 1607	23 August 1613
John Harington, 2nd Baron Harington of Exton	8 October 1613	27 February 1614
Henry Hastings, 5th Earl of Huntingdon jointly with Ferdinando Hastings, 6th Earl of Huntingdon	1614; 27 December 1638	1642; 1642
David Cecil, 3rd Earl of Exeter	5 March 1642	1643
Interregnum 1643–1660
Baptist Noel, 3rd Viscount Campden	9 August 1660	29 October 1682
Edward Noel, 1st Earl of Gainsborough jointly with Wriothesley Noel, Viscount Campden	17 November 1682; 24 March 1685	23 January 1688; 23 January 1688
Henry Mordaunt, 2nd Earl of Peterborough	23 January 1688	28 August 1690
Bennet Sherard, 2nd Baron Sherard	28 August 1690	15 January 1700
Bennet Sherard, 3rd Baron Sherard	11 March 1700	14 November 1712
John Cecil, 6th Earl of Exeter	14 November 1712	12 September 1715
Bennet Sherard, 1st Earl of Harborough	12 September 1715	16 October 1732
Philip Sherard, 2nd Earl of Harborough	17 July 1733	20 July 1750
Brownlow Cecil, 9th Earl of Exeter	6 June 1751	12 April 1779
George Finch, 9th Earl of Winchilsea	12 April 1779	2 August 1826
Brownlow Cecil, 2nd Marquess of Exeter	7 October 1826	16 January 1867
Charles Noel, 2nd Earl of Gainsborough	22 February 1867	13 August 1881
William Tollemache, 9th Earl of Dysart	3 November 1881	29 March 1906
John Brocklehurst, 1st Baron Ranksborough	29 March 1906	28 February 1921
Gilbert Heathcote-Drummond-Willoughby, 2nd Earl of Ancaster	6 January 1921	29 September 1951
William Melville Codrington	5 February 1951	29 April 1963
Thomas Haywood (subsequently Lieutenant of Leicestershire)	12 August 1963	31 March 1974
Lord-Lieutenancy abolished after Rutland merged with Leicestershire
Sir Thomas Lawrie (Jock) Kennedy	1 April 1997	14 July 2003
Sir Laurence Howard	14 July 2003	29 March 2018
Dr Sarah Furness	3 April 2018	Present
