= 2017 Birthday Honours =

British government recognitions

The 2017 Queen's Birthday Honours were appointments by some of the 16 Commonwealth realms of Queen Elizabeth II to various orders and honours to reward and highlight good works by citizens of those countries. The Birthday Honours were awarded as part of the Queen's Official Birthday celebrations during the month of June. The Queen's Birthday Honours for the United Kingdom were announced on 16 June; the honours for New Zealand were announced on 5 June and for Australia on 12 June.

The recipients of honours are displayed as they were styled before their new honour. They are arranged by the country (in order of precedence) whose ministers advised the Queen on the appointments, then by honour with grades, i.e. Knight/Dame Grand Cross, Knight/Dame Commander etc., and then by divisions, i.e. Civil, Diplomatic and Military as appropriate.

== United Kingdom ==
Below are the individuals appointed by Elizabeth II in her right as Queen of the United Kingdom with honours within her own gift, and with the advice of the Government for other honours.

=== George Cross (GC) ===
- Dominic Charles Troulan, QGM. For saving lives during the Westgate Shopping Mall terrorist attack in Kenya in 2013.

=== George Medal (GM) ===
- Bernard Carter Kenny. For his assistance to Jo Cox MP.
- PC Keith Palmer (deceased), Metropolitan Police. For confronting an armed terrorist to protect others and Parliament.

=== Member of the Order of the Companions of Honour (CH) ===
- Sir Terence Orby Conran. For services to Design.
- Sir Mark Philip Elder, CBE, Musical Director, The Hallé Orchestra. For services to Music.
- Dame Beryl Elizabeth Grey, DBE. For services to Dance.
- Sir James Paul McCartney, MBE, Musician. For services to Music.
- Joanne Kathleen Rowling, OBE, Author. For services to Literature and Philanthropy.
- Dame Vera Stephanie Shirley, DBE, FREng, Entrepreneur and Philanthropist. For services to the IT Industry and Philanthropy.
- Delia Ann Smith, CBE, Cook and Writer. For services to Cookery.
- Nicholas Herbert, Baron Stern of Brentford, FRS, FBA. For services to Economics, International Relations and Tackling Climate Change.
- Sir John Edward Sulston, FRS. For services to Science and Society.

=== Knight Bachelor ===
- George Benjamin, CBE – Composer, Conductor and Performer. For services to Music.
- Leonard Blavatnik – For services to Philanthropy.
- Mark Boleat – Lately chairman, Policy and Resources Committee, City of London Corporation. For services to the Financial Services Industry and to Local Government in London.
- Billy Connolly, CBE – For services to Entertainment and charity.
- Professor Charles Godfray, CBE – Hope Professor of Zoology, University of Oxford. For services to Scientific Research and for Scientific Advice to Government.
- Professor Simon Lovestone – Professor of Translational Neuroscience, University of Oxford. For services to Neuroscience Research.
- Dr. John Menzies Low, CBE – Chief Executive, Charities Aid Foundation. For charitable services.
- Frank Lowy AC – Chairman, Westfield Corporation. For services to business and philanthropy
- Professor Anton Muscatelli, FRSE – Vice-Chancellor and Principal, University of Glasgow. For services to Economics and Higher Education.
- Trevor Steven Pears CMG – Executive Chairman of the Pears Family Charitable Foundation. For services to philanthropy.
- Professor Graham John Thornicroft – Consultant Psychiatrist and Professor of Community Psychiatry, King's College London. For services to Mental Health.
- His Hon. Peter Thornton – Lately Chief Coroner of England and Wales. For services to the Administration of Justice and the Coroner Service.
- John Timpson, CBE – For services to Business and Fostering.
- Malcolm Conrad Walker, CBE – Chairman and Chief Executive, Iceland Frozen Food. For services to Retailing, Entrepreneurship and charity.
- Professor Mir Saeed Zahedi, OBE FREng – Technical Director, Chas A Blatchford & Sons. For services to Engineering and Innovation.
- Professor Alimuddin Zumla – Professor of Infectious Diseases and International Health, University College London. For services to Public Health and Protection from Infectious Disease.

=== The Most Honourable Order of the Bath ===
==== Knight / Dame Commander of the Order of the Bath (KCB/DCB) ====
Military Division

Royal Navy

- Vice Admiral Simon Robert Lister, C.B., O.B.E., C026152P.

Civil Division

- Claire Elizabeth Clancy, Chief Executive and Clerk, National Assembly for Wales. For public service in Wales.
- Thomas Whinfield Scholar, Permanent Secretary, HM Treasury. For public service.
- Christopher Stephen Wormald, Permanent Secretary, Department of Health. For public service.

==== Companion of the Order of the Bath (CB) ====
Military Division

Royal Navy

- Surgeon Vice Admiral Alasdair James Walker, O.B.E., Q.H.S., C025111J.
- Rear Admiral Simon Paul Williams, C.V.O., C026810R.

British Army

- Major General Mark Jarvis Gaunt, 520645.
- Major General John Robert Patterson, 518170.

Royal Air Force

- Air Vice-Marshal Malcolm Andrew John Brecht, CBE, Royal Air Force, 5204296N.
- Air Vice-Marshal Edward Jackson Stringer, C.B.E., Royal Air Force, 5204227Q.

Civil Division

- Janet Mary Aiston – Director, Wealthy and Mid-Sized Business Compliance, HM Revenue and Customs. For services to Tax Payers and Tax Collection.
- Janice Lindsay Hartley – Implementation and Delivery Director, Universal Credit, Department for Work and Pensions. For services to the Development of Universal Credit.
- Tyson Julian Hepple – Director, Immigration and Protection. For services to the Home Office.
- Diana Frances Luchford – Lately Crime Director, Home Office. For services to Reducing Crime and to Public Order.
- Jon Lyle – Chief Executive, Defence Science and Technology Laboratory. For services to Defence.
- Peter Neil Milledge – Lately Counsel to the Chairman of Committees, House of Lords. For services to the House of Lords.
- Peter Hugh Gordon Schofield – Lately Director General, Housing and Planning, Department for Communities and Local Government. For services to Housing and Planning.

=== The Most Distinguished Order of Saint Michael and Saint George ===
==== Knight / Dame Commander of The Order of Saint Michael and Saint George (KCMG/DCMG) ====
- Jonathan Michael Howard Faull – Former Director General in the European Commission. For services to UK relations with the European Union.
- Shan Morgan, CMG – Former Deputy Permanent Representative, UK Representation to the European Union. For services to the UK's interests in the European Union.

==== Companion of the Order of Saint Michael and Saint George (CMG) ====
- Asif Ahmad – HM Ambassador, Manila, Philippines. For services to British interests in South East Asia
- Madeline Alessandrí – Director, Foreign and Commonwealth Office. For services to British foreign policy
- Edward Bannister, QC – former Eastern Caribbean Supreme Court Commercial Court Judge. For services to justice in the Eastern Caribbean
- Mark Bowden – Former United Nations Secretary-General's Deputy Special Representative, UN Resident and Humanitarian Coordinator and United Nations Development Programme Representative for Afghanistan. For services to humanitarian assistance
- Dr. Carolyn Browne – HM Ambassador, Astana, Kazakhstan. For services to British foreign policy
- Christine Mary Chinkin – Director, Centre for Women, Peace and Security, London School of Economics and Political Science. For services to advancing women's human rights worldwide
- Howard Drake, OBE – High Commissioner, Ottawa, Canada. For services to UK/Canada relations
- Matthew Kidd – High Commissioner, Nicosia, Republic of Cyprus. For services to UK/Cyprus relations
- Stephen Lillie – Lately Director, Asia Pacific, Foreign and Commonwealth Office. For services to UK relations with the Asia Pacific region
- Charles Tito Powell – Director, Real Instituto Elcano. For services to UK/Spanish relations
- Mark Leslie Stephens – Former British Council Country Director, Egypt, now Regional Director, South Asia. For services to UK/Egypt cultural relations

=== Royal Victorian Order ===
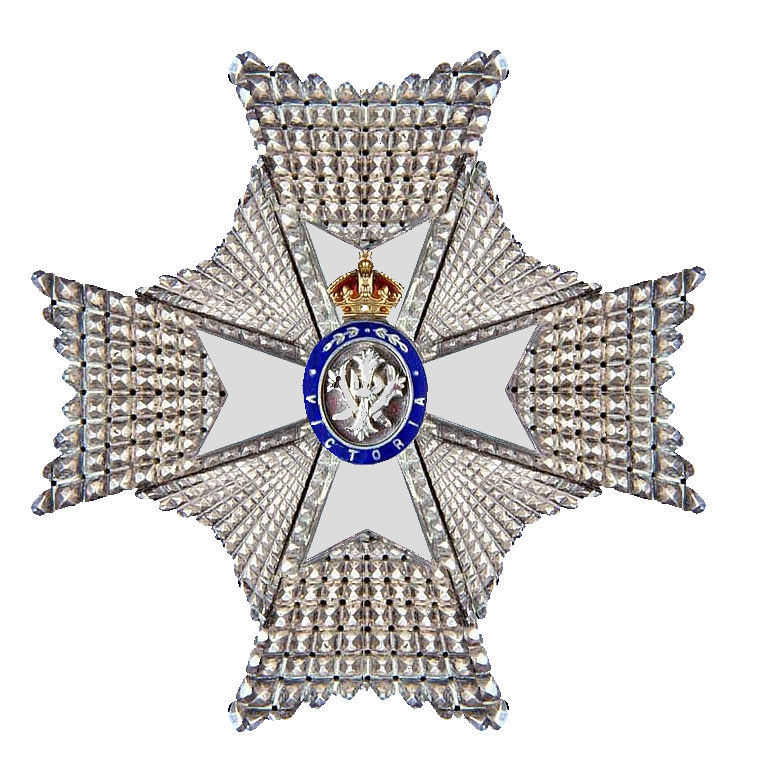
Insignia of a Knight / Dame Commander of the Royal Victorian Order

==== Knight / Dame Commander of the Royal Victorian Order (KCVO/DCVO) ====
- Dr. Laurence Howard, OBE, JP, Lord Lieutenant of Rutland
- Mark Henry Hudson, Chairman, Duchy of Lancaster Council
- The Rt Hon. The Baroness Gretton, Lord Lieutenant of Leicestershire
- Dr. Ingrid Mary Roscoe, Lord Lieutenant of West Yorkshire

==== Commander of the Royal Victorian Order (CVO) ====
- Martin Dudley Beaumont – Member, Duchy of Lancaster Council
- Simon George Francis Graham Berry – Clerk of the Royal Cellars
- Victoria Lindsay Legge-Bourke, LVO – formerly Lady-in-Wainting to The Princess Royal
- Joseph Willoughby David Clarke, LVO – For services as Regional Director of the Americas, The Duke of Edinburgh's International Award Foundation
- Mark Edward Trehearne Davies – Trustee, Ascot Authority
- Margaret Annie Geddes Dunnett – Lord Lieutenant of Caithness
- Mark Murray Leishman, LVO – Private Secretary to The Prince of Wales and The Duchess of Cornwall
- Georgiana Louise Osborne – Lord Lieutenant of Angus
- Clare Nancy Russell – Lord Lieutenant of Banffshire
- Paul Chandrasekharan Sabapathy, CBE – formerly Lord Lieutenant of the West Midlands

==== Lieutenant of the Royal Victorian Order (LVO) ====
- Antigoni Christodoulou, MVO – Comptroller, the Duke and Duchess of Kent's Household
- Caroline Claire, Comtesse de Guitaut, MVO – Senior Curator of Decorative Arts, Royal Collection Trust
- Richard Robert Gledson – Resident Factor, Balmoral estate
- David Simon Hutson, MVO – Keeper of the Archives and Secretary, Household of The Prince of Wales and The Duchess of Cornwall
- Brigadier David James Innes, OBE – formerly Lieutenant, The Queen's Bodyguard of the Yeomen of the Guard
- Michael Uvedale Lambert – Honorary Secretary, the Royal Agricultural Society of the Commonwealth
- Tosanbanmi Efua Eva Williams – Deputy Communications Secretary to The Prince of Wales and The Duchess of Cornwall
- Lesley Ann Wolfenden – company secretary, Business in the Community and The Prince′s Countryside Fund

==== Member of the Royal Victorian Order (MVO) ====
- Diana Joan Barrett – formerly Assistant House Manager, Government House, Perth, Western Australia
- Ann Butcher – Land Agent′s Secretary, Sandringham estate
- Janet Byrne – Programme Co-ordinator, Household of Princess Alexandra, The Honourable Lady Ogilvy
- Claire Elizabeth Chorley – Paintings Conservator, Royal Collection Trust
- Sergeant Arthur James Harington Clyne – Metropolitan Police Service. For services to Royalty Protection
- Richard William Hubert Codman – RVM Farm Foreman, Sandringham estate
- Caroline Creer – Head of Private Secretary′s Office Secretariat, Royal Household
- Mary Jane Goodchild – Volunteer, The Prince's Trust
- Mark Geoffrey (Jack) Hargreaves – formerly Head Coachman, Royal Mews
- Kathryn Jane Jones – Senior Curator of Decorative Arts, Royal Collection Trust
- Charlotte Elizabeth Martin – Secretary, Lord Chamberlain's Office
- Kathleen Craig Mason – Clerk to the Lieutenancy of Tweeddale
- Rebecca Anne Priestley – Private Secretary to The Duchess of Cambridge
- Antony Kevin Rabey, RVM – Butler to The Prince of Wales and The Duchess of Cornwall
- Inspector William Benedict Renshaw – Metropolitan Police Service. For services to Royalty Protection
- Philip Rhodes – Senior Page of the Chambers, Master of the Household's Department
- Peter Geraint Richards – Head Forester, Duchy of Cornwall
- Sian Ellis Williams – For services to the Lieutenancy of Gwynedd

=== The Most Excellent Order of the British Empire ===
==== Knight Grand Cross of the Order of the British Empire (GBE) ====
- Sir Michael David Rawlins, Chair, Medicines and Healthcare products Regulatory Agency. For services to the Safety of Medicines, Healthcare and Innovation.
- Professor Sir David John Weatherall, Regius Professor of Clinical Medicine Emeritus, The Weatherall Institute of Molecular Medicine, University of Oxford. For services to Medicine.

==== Knight/Dame Commander of the Order of the British Empire (KBE/DBE) ====
Civil

- Hilary Boulding. For services to Education and Culture in Wales.
- Carmen Thérèse Callil, Founder, Virago Press. For services to Literature.
- Sarah Patricia Connolly, CBE, Mezzo Soprano. For services to Music.
- Barbara Mary Frost, Chief Executive, WaterAid. For services to the provision of safe water, sanitation and hygiene in developing countries
- Olivia Mary De Havilland, Actress. For services to Drama.
- Professor Carolyn Paula Hamilton, Director, International Programmes and Research, Coram Children's Legal Centre; barrister and professor. For services to Children's Rights.
- Professor Xiangqian "Jane" Jiang, Director, UK EPSRC Future Advanced Metrology Hub, University of Huddersfield. For services to Engineering and Manufacturing.
- Professor Parveen June Kumar, (Mrs Leaver), CBE, Professor of Medicine and Education, Bart's and the London School of Medicine, Queen Mary, University of London. For services to Medicine and Medical Education.
- Professor Theresa Mary Marteau, Honorary Professor and Director, Behaviour and Health Research Unit, University of Cambridge. For services to Public Health.
- Helena Louise Morrissey, CBE. For services to Diversity in Financial Services.
- The Rt Hon. Stephen Rothwell O'Brien, Former United Nations Under-Secretary General for Humanitarian Affairs & Emergency Relief Co-ordinator. For services to the United Nations and humanitarian affairs
- Priscilla Deborah Snowball, CBE, Group Chief Executive Officer and Group Chairman, AMVBBDO Advertising Agency. For services to Advertising, Diversity and Equality.
- Dr. Angela Rosemary Emily Strank, Chief Scientist and Head of Downstream Technology, BP. For services to the Oil and Gas Industry and Encouraging Women into STEM Careers.
- Julia Mary Walters, CBE, Actress. For services to Drama.
- June Rosemary Whitfield, CBE, Actress. For services to Drama and Entertainment.

==== Commander of the Order of the British Empire (CBE) ====
Military

Royal Navy

- RAdm Timothy Miles Lowe, QCVS
- RAdm John Clink, OBE
- Brigadier Richard Anthony Winchcombe Spencer, OBE

British Army

- Col. Michael Robert Butterwick
- Col. William Pemble Owen English
- Brig Colin Thomas McClean, MBE
- Brig Tom Richardson Copinger-Symes, OBE
- Maj-Gen Ralph Wooddisse, MBE, MC

Royal Air Force

- GrCpt Stephen Alec Bentley
- ACm Dawn Allison McCafferty

Civil

- Dr. John Colin Adams, Lately Director of Commercialisation and Director of Informatic Ventures, University of Edinburgh. For services to Innovation and Entrepreneurship.
- Sade (Helen Folasade Adu), OBE, Singer, Songwriter and Composer. For services to Music.
- John Akomfrah, OBE. For services to Art and Film Making.
- Richard James Frank Alcock, Chief Operating Officer, Office for Security and Counter-Terrorism, Home Office. For services to National Security.
- Professor Ruth Annand, Lord Chancellor's Appointed Person. For services to Intellectual Property.
- Nicholas Peter Baldwin, Chair, Office for Nuclear Regulation. For services to Nuclear Safety and Security and to the charitable sector.
- Elizabeth Christiana Banks, DL. For services to Horticulture through the Royal Horticultural Society.
- Ian Bauckham, Executive Headteacher, Bennett Memorial Diocesan School, CEO, Tenax Schools Trust|The Tenax Schools Trust and President, Association of School and College Leaders. For services to Education.
- Professor Haro Moushegh Bedelian, OBE FREng. For services to Engineering and International Trade.
- Beverley Claire Bell, Lately Senior Traffic Commissioner for Great Britain. For services to Road Safety and the Freight Industry.
- Edwin Joseph Beltrami. Chief Crown Prosecutor London North, Crown Prosecution Service. For services to Law and Order.
- Professor Serena Michelle Best, FREng, Professor of Materials Science, University of Cambridge. For services to Biomaterials Engineering.
- Peter Malcolm Black, Councillor, Cwmbwrla Ward, Swansea City Council. For services to Politics and Public Life in Wales.
- Cllr Judith Vivienne Blake, Leader, Leeds City Council. For services to Local Government.
- Dr. Ronald George Blythe, Author. For services to Literature.
- Professor Carol Elseth Goodeve Brayne, Professor of Public Health Medicine, Department of Public Health and Primary Care, University of Cambridge. For services to Public Health Medicine.
- Raymond Redvers Briggs, Illustrator, Cartoonist and Author. For services to Literature.
- Pauline Broomhead. For services to Charity Management and Young People.
- Peter James Budd, Director Arup & Partners Ltd and Deputy Chairman of the China-Britain Business Council. For services to promoting British trade in China
- Wayne Bulputt. For voluntary service to the Scout Association.
- Humphrey Alan Edward Cadoux-Hudson, Managing Director, Nuclear New Build Generation Company Ltd, EDF Energy plc. For services to Secure Low-Carbon Electricity.
- Anita Rose Charlesworth, Economist. For services to Economics and Health Policy.
- Sally Kaye Cheshire, Chair, Human Fertilisation and Embryology Authority (HFEA) and Chair, Health Education England (North). For services to the NHS and Infertility Patients.
- Charlotte Lucy Clark, Director, Private Pensions and Stewardship, Department for Work and Pensions. For services to DWP.
- Dr. Nicholas Paul Clarke, Head of Professional Regulation, NHS. For services to Acute Care and Workforce.
- John Edward Cunningham, Managing Director, Camlin Ltd. For services to the Business Community in Northern Ireland.
- Professor Norma Margaret Dawson, Professor of Law, Queen's University, Belfast. For services to Legal Education and the Development of the Legal Profession in Northern Ireland.
- Niall Forbes Ross Dickson, Lately Chief Executive, General Medical Council. For services to Patient Safety.
- His Hon. Judge Marc David Dight, Senior Circuit Judge, Central London County Court. For services to Diversity and Community Relations in the Judiciary.
- Anthony Michael Manton Elliott, Founder, Time Out. For services to Publishing.
- Gerald Hunter Finley, OC, Opera singer. For services to Opera.
- Rose Mary Fitzpatrick, QPM, Deputy Chief Constable, Police Scotland. For services to Law and Order.
- Professor Carlos Silvestre Frenk, FRS, Ogden Professor of Fundamental Physics, Durham University. For services to Cosmology and the Public Dissemination of Basic Science.
- Professor Jonathan Israel Gershuny, FBA, Professor of Economic Sociology and Senior Research Fellow, Nuffield College, University of Oxford. For services to the Social Sciences and Sociology.
- Professor Aisha Kulwant Gill, Professor of Criminology, University of Roehampton. For services to Tackling Forced Marriage, Honour Crimes and Violence against Women.
- David Warren Godfrey. For services to the British Export Economy and Charity Finance.
- Alexander David (Lex) Greensill, Founder and Chief Executive, Greensill Capital. For services to the Economy.
- Barbara Joan Gubbins, DL, Chief Executive, County Durham Community Foundation. For services to the Voluntary and Community Sectors.
- Michael Arnold Hammond. For services to International Development.
- Dr Andrew Charles Harter, FREng, Founder and CEO, RealVNC Ltd. For services to Engineering.
- Prof Andrew Tym Hattersley, FRS, Professor of Molecular Medicine, University of Exeter, and Consultant Physician, Royal Devon and Exeter NHS Foundation Trust. For services to Medical Science.
- Alasdair George Hay, QFSM. For services to the Scottish Fire and Rescue Service.
- Dr. Gordon Christopher Horsfield. For services to Young People and to Charitable Giving.
- Lady Margaret Joan Jarvis. For services to People with Visual Impairments and to Philanthropy.
- Isaac Julien – Artist and Film Maker. For services to the Arts.
- Dr. Anthony Juniper, Fellow, University of Cambridge Institute for Sustainability Leadership. For services to Conservation.
- Paul Kehoe, Chief Executive Officer, Birmingham International Airport. For services to the Aviation Industry and UK Economy.
- Robert Keiller, Chairman, Scottish Enterprise. For services to Business and Entrepreneurship.
- Stephen Philip Lansdown. For services to Business and the community in Bristol.
- Professor Deborah Lawlor, Professor of Epidemiology, University of Bristol. For services to Social and Community Medicine.
- Professor Melissa Leach, Director, Institute of Development Studies, University of Sussex. For services to the Social Sciences.
- Professor Graham Andrew Leslie, Visiting Professor of Enterprise and Entrepreneurship, Huddersfield University. For services to Entrepreneurship.
- Amanda Levete, Architect. For services to Architecture.
- Ani Magill, Executive Headteacher, St. John the Baptist Catholic Comprehensive School, Woking. For services to Education.
- William Mackendrick Mann. For services to Sport, Recreation, the Arts and charity.
- Alexandra Louise Marks, Crown Court Recorder, Criminal Cases Review Commissioner, Judicial Appointments Commissioner and Chair, Prisoners' Education Trust. For public service.
- Graham Christopher Spencer Mather, President, European Policy Forum. For services to Economic Regulation, Competition and Infrastructure Development.
- Dr. Julie Katherine Maxton, Executive Director, The Royal Society of London. For services to Science, Law and Education.
- Bernard Cornelius McCaughey, Director of Rehabilitation, Northern Ireland Prison Service. For public service.
- Colin James Stewart McClatchie, FRSE, Vice-President, Scottish Opera. For services to Music and voluntary service in the West of Scotland.
- Andrew McNab. For services to Literacy and charity.
- Gilian Mary McNeil, Director and Chief Executive, Theirworld. For services to the Health and Education of Vulnerable Children and Women.
- Helena Mills, Chief Executive Officer, Burnt Mill Academy Trust, Essex. For services to Education.
- Professor John Hardman Moore, FBA FRSE, Professor of Political Economy, University of Edinburgh and Professor of Economic Theory, London School of Economics. For services to Economics.
- Melvyn Morris, Non-Executive Chairman, King. For services to Business and charitable services.
- Alison Mary Munro, Managing Director, Phase 2, HS2 Ltd. For services to the Rail Industry.
- Diana Georgina Noble, Chief Executive, CDC Group. For services to International Development.
- Dr Carl Michael O'Brien, Chief Fisheries Science Adviser, Cefas. For services to the Management of Internationally-shared Fisheries.
- Dr Crystal Elizabeth Oldman, Chief Executive, Queen's Nursing Institute. For services to the Queen's Nursing Institute and Community Nursing.
- Adrian Packer, Chief Executive Officer, Core Education Trust. For services to Education.
- William Henry Marcello Parente. For services to the Arts and Philanthropy.
- Dr. Paul Lasseter Phillips, OBE, Principal and CEO, Weston College Group, Weston-super-Mare. For services to Further and Higher Education.
- Professor Lucilla Poston, Head, Division of Women's Health, King's College London and KCL Campus Dean, St. Thomas' Hospital. For services to Women's Health.
- Lesley Anne Powell, CEO, North East Learning Trust, Principal, Shotton Hall Academy and Member of the Headteacher Board for the North. For services to Education.
- Claire Jennifer Price, Chief Executive, Sport England. For services to Sport, especially increasing Women and Girls participation in Sport
- Lucinda Jane Riches, Non-Executive Director, UK Financial Investments. For services to Financial Services, British Industry and charity.
- Jane Christina Rintoul. For public service.
- Christopher Alfred Robbins. For political and public service.
- Hugo Robson, Chief Commercial Negotiator, Department for Business, Energy and Industrial Strategy. For services to the Security of Low-Carbon Electricity.
- Professor Shamit Saggar, Associate Pro-Vice-Chancellor, Professor of Political Science and Public Policy, University of Essex. For services to Social Science and Public Policy.
- Christopher James Satterthwaite, Chairman, The Roundhouse. For services to the Arts.
- Mary Elizabeth Scanlon. For political and public service.
- Terrence Scuoler – chief executive officer, Engineering Employers Federation. For services to Manufacturing and Engineering.
- Nora Margaret Senior, President, British Chambers of Commerce. For services to the Scottish and UK Business Community.
- Louise Claire Shepherd, Chief Executive, Alder Hey Children's NHS Foundation Trust, Liverpool. For services to Healthcare.
- Professor Charles Pirie Skene, OBE. For services to Business and Enterprise Promotion.
- Alan Frank Smith, Chairman, RAF Charitable Trust Enterprises. For voluntary service to RAF Personnel.
- June Rosalind Spencer, OBE, Actress. For services to Drama and charity.
- Stephanie Spring, Chair, Children in Need. For services to charity.
- Euan Rodgers Stewart, OBE, Head of Intelligence, HM Revenue and Customs. For services to Protecting Tax Revenue.
- Bernard John Taylor, DL. For services to Business, Education and the Arts.
- Professor Pamela Jane Taylor, Professor of Forensic Psychiatry, Cardiff University. For services to Forensic Psychiatry.
- Kenneth Olumuyiwa Tharp, OBE, Lately Chief Executive, The Place. For services to Dance.
- Professor Alexandra Marie Walsham, FBA, Professor of Modern History, University of Cambridge. For services to History.
- Jennifer Watson, Lately Chair, Electoral Commission. For services to Electoral Democracy.
- Professor Graham Charles Murray Watt, FRSE, Norie Miller Chair of General Practice, University of Glasgow. For services to Healthcare.
- Professor Jean Christine White, Chief Nursing Officer, Welsh Government. For services to Nursing and Midwifery in the UK and Europe.
- Petra Wilkinson, Head, Transport Security Co-ordination and Operational Response, Department for Transport. For services to Transport Security.
- Paul Ernest Williams, Labour Market Operations Director, Department for Work and Pensions. For services to DWP and to charity.
- Gregory Mark Wood, Chairman, NSPCC. For services to Children and Young People.

==== Officer of the Order of the British Empire (OBE) ====
- Thorhilda Mary Vivia Abbott-Watt, HM Ambassador, Ashgabat, Turkmenistan. For services to British foreign policy
- Agatha Mary Akyigyina. For political and public service.
- Aubrey John Adams, Honorary Patron and Chair, Wigmore Hall. For services to the Arts.
- Dawn Ailsa Adams, Clinical Director, Public Dental Service, NHS Fife. For services to Dentistry.
- Rupert Joe Fairfax Ainley, First Secretary, British Embassy, Beijing, China. For services to UK energy security and UK/China relations
- Professor Michael Calvert Appleby, Lately Chief Scientific Adviser, World Animal Protection. For services to Animal Welfare.
- John Archbold, Programme Manager, Liverpool, HM Revenue and Customs. For services to Digital Innovation and the community in Merseyside.
- Professor Polly Arnold, Crum Brown Chair of Chemistry, University of Edinburgh. For services to Chemistry and Women in STEM.
- Catherine Ashley, Lately Chair, Holocaust Memorial Day Trust. For services to Holocaust Commemoration and Awareness.
- Neil Roderick Baker, Lately Consultant Podiatrist, Ipswich Hospital NHS Trust. For services to Podiatry and Diabetes.
- Rodney Lister Bass, Lately Councillor, Essex County Council, For services to Local Government.
- Catherine Mary Bennett, Lately National Director for Wales, Equality and Human Rights Commission. For services to Equality and Human Rights.
- Richard Jonathan Benson, President, Tell MAMA and board member, Community Security Trust. For services to the Jewish community.
- Rory David Best. For services to Rugby.
- Professor Graeme Black, Professor of Genetics and Ophthalmology, Central Manchester University Hospitals NHS Foundation Trust. For services to Genetics and Ophthalmology.
- Professor Katherine Blundell, Professor of Astrophysics, University of Oxford. For services to Astronomy and the Education of Young People.
- Ruth Dorothy Bovill, Headteacher, Heathermount Special Needs School, Berkshire. For services to Special Educational Needs and Disabilities.
- Keith George Bradshaw. For services to charity and Young People in the West Midlands.
- Simon Thomas Bramwell, chief executive officer, SS Simon and Jude C.E. Primary Academy Trust. For services to Education
- Professor Susan Mary Braye, Emerita Professor of Social Work, University of Sussex. For services to Vulnerable People.
- Andrea Ruth Brewster, Member and Lately President, Chartered Institute of Patent Attorneys. For services to Intellectual Property.
- Tracey Brown, Director, Sense about Science. For services to Science.
- Justine Iris Bryer, Co-Founder & President, The European Union Youth Orchestra. For services to arts, culture, youth, education and international relations
- Professor William Buchanan, Professor of Computing and director, Centre for Networking, Security and Distributed Systems, Edinburgh Napier University. For services to Cyber Security.
- Sally Jane Burlington, Head of Policy, Local Government Association. For services to Adult Social Services.
- Michael Cecill Chairman, Rathlin Development and Community Association. For services to Community Development on Rathlin Island.
- Roger Arthur Holden Chadwick, Member, Courts of Common Council and The Irish Society. For services to the City of London Corporation and community initiatives in Northern Ireland.
- Michael Hugh Cherry, National Policy chairman, Federation of Small Businesses. For services to the Small Business Community.
- Sultan Ahmed Choudhury, Chief Executive Officer, Al Rayan Bank. For services to the UK Market for Islamic Finance.
- William John Chrispin, Project Manager, Ministry of Defence. For services to Defence Acquisition and to Military Capability.
- Colin Edward Church, Former chief executive officer, Rhino Ark. For services to conservation, the environment and the community in Kenya
- Professor David Clark, Wellcome Trust Investigator, University of Glasgow. For services to Education in Dumfries and Galloway and Research into End of Life Care.
- John Gordon Cluff. For services to Business and charity.
- David John Coldman. For services to Business, Young People and charity.
- Jeremy Michael Rooke Collingridge. For voluntary service in Leicestershire.
- Hugh Connor, Director, Centre for Effective Services. For services to Social Care.
- James Gareth Cooper, Chief Executive, Middletown Centre for Autism Ltd. For services to Children with Special Educational Needs.
- Major General Patrick Anthony John Cordingley, Chair, National Remembrance Visitor Centre Appeal Council, National Memorial Arboretum. For voluntary service.
- Professor Philip Cotton, Vice-Chancellor of the University of Rwanda. For services to education in Rwanda.
- Jane Cowell, Director, Young People's Funding Allocations and Student Support, Education Funding Agency. For services to the Department for Education.
- John Sebastian Cox, Head, Air Historical Branch, Ministry of Defence. For services to the Royal Air Force and Aviation Heritage.
- Richard Michael Beresford Crocker, Lately Deputy Head of Mission, Juba, South Sudan. For services to British interests in South Sudan
- Professor Margaret Elizabeth Cupples, Professor of General Practice, Queen's University, Belfast and General Practitioner. For services to Higher Education and Healthcare in Northern Ireland.
- Dr. Mehtabunisa Currey. For services to Global International Development
- Lauren Currie, Co-founder, SNOOK. For services to British Design Industry Exports and to Diversity in Design.
- Christopher David Daniel, Lately Change and Implementation Group Manager, Department for Work and Pensions. For services to DWP and Cancer charities.
- Christopher Darmon, For services to Young People through the Youth Hostel Association.
- Clare Davies, HR Director, Metropolitan Police Service. For services to Policing.
- Colm Francis Davis, Principal, Tor Bank School. For services to Children with Special Educational Needs.
- Michael John De Giorgio. For services to Sport and the community in London.
- Louis Anthony Desa, Lately Headteacher, Bishop Thomas Grant Catholic Secondary School, London. For services to Education.
- Joan Miner Deslandes, Headteacher, Kingsford Community School, Beckton, London. For services to Education.
- Professor Belinda Jane Dewar, Professor of Practice Improvement, University of the West of Scotland. For services to Nursing.
- David Dewing, Lately Director, the Geffrye Museum of the Home. For services to the Arts.
- Sital Singh Dhillon, Head of Law and Criminology, Sheffield Hallam University. For services to Higher Education.
- Dr. Thomas Nicholas Dixon. For services to Underwater Archaeology, Public Engagement and the Economy in Scotland.
- Declan Michael Martin Donnellan. For services to Theatre.
- Mark Ducker, Executive Principal and chief executive officer, STEP Academy Trust. For services to Education.
- Brian Leslie Dunsby, Director, Yorkshire Business Market Ltd and lately Chief Executive, Harrogate Chamber of Trade and Commerce. For services to Business and the community in Harrogate.
- Belinda Jane Earl, Style Director, Marks and Spencer. For services to Retail.
- Professor Christopher Trevor Elliott, Pro-Vice-Chancellor, Faculty of Medicine, Health and Life Sciences, Queen's University, Belfast. For services to the Agri-Food Supply Chain.
- Gloria Maureen Elliott, Chief Executive, Noise Abatement Society. For services to Awareness of and Solutions to Pollution from Noise.
- Professor Alison Etheridge, FRS, Professor of Probability, Mathematical Institute and Department of Statistics, University of Oxford. For services to Science.
- Dr. David Thomas Evans, National Teaching Fellow and Senior Lecturer in Sexual Health, University of Greenwich, London. For services to Nursing and Sexual Health Education.
- Roger Malcolm Evans. For services to the UK Dairy Industry and local community.
- Lynda Fairhurst, Lately Head of Lifelong Learning, Oldham Council. For services to Further Education.
- Andrew William Mildmay Fane. For services to Heritage and charity.
- Laura Madeline Alexandra Faulkner, Director, Live Marketing and E-Commerce, Department for International Trade. For services to UK Exports.
- Dr. Tanya Mary Caro-Lynne Ferris, Director, Outdoor Recreation Northern Ireland. For services to Countryside Recreation in Northern Ireland.
- Ginny Ferson, Deputy Governor of Bermuda. For services to child safeguarding in the British Overseas Territories
- William Alexander Finlayson, Founder, MBM Commercial. For services to Entrepreneurship and voluntary service in Scotland.
- Janet Elizabeth Fishwick, Chief Executive, Parents and Children Together and Member, Adoption Leadership Boards, London and South East. For services to Adoption.
- Sebastien Fouquet. For services to Humanitarian Aid in Africa.
- William Michael Furniss. For services to Swimming.
- Alan Tevor Gay, Deputy Chief Executive and Section 151 Officer, Leeds City Council. For services to Local Government.
- Julian Keith Getty. For services to Music and Modern Hymn Writing.
- Professor Brenda Elizabeth Simpson Gibson, Lead Clinician for Haematology and Oncology Service, Glasgow Royal Hospital for Children. For services to Child Healthcare.
- Michael Goodhand, Head of Logistics, International Division, British Red Cross. For services to Disaster Relief.
- Dr. Deborah Katherine Goodwin, Head, Communication and Applied Behavioural Science Department, Royal Military Academy Sandhurst, Ministry of Defence. For services to Armed Forces Staff Education.
- William Gowdy, Director of Engineering Procurement, Northern Ireland Water. For services to Civil Engineering and Education.
- Dorothy Anne Gradden, Head of Programme Delivery, Legacy Ponds, Sellafield Limited. For services to the Nuclear Industry.
- Carmel Jane Grant, Head, Army Reform Team, Ministry of Defence. For services to Army Reform.
- Keith Green, Counsellor, Foreign and Commonwealth Office. For services to British/Colombian relations
- Kenneth Thomas Green. For voluntary political service.
- Professor Laura Elizabeth Green, Leader, Research Group, School of Life Sciences, University of Warwick. For services to the Health and Welfare of Farmed Livestock.
- John Richard Heaton Greenwood. For services to National and International Rugby.
- Dr. Julie Patricia Greeves, Research Scientist, Ministry of Defence. For services to Military Operational Effectiveness.
- Linda Gregson, Head, Primary Care Transformation Team, Scottish Government. For services to Education and Social Care.
- Inga Margaret Amy Grimsey. For services to Heritage and the community.
- John Guthrie. For charitable services.
- Professor Erica Victoria Haimes, Emeritus Professor of Sociology and Founding Executive Director, Policy, Ethics and Life Sciences Research Centre, Newcastle University. For services to Social Science.
- John Neville Hare, Founder of Wild Camel Protection Foundation. For services to conservation of the wild camel in Mongolia and China
- Roger Toby Soames Hargreaves, Director, Hybrid Bill Delivery, High Speed 2 Ltd. For services to Transport.
- Asif Abdul Haseeb. For services to Racial Equality, Health and Education in Scotland and Pakistan.
- Susan Carol Hawks. For services to the Conservative Party.
- Dr. Geoffrey Charles Hawtin, Lately Member, Board of Trustees, Kew Gardens. For services to Global Agrobiodiversity Conservation, Subsistence Livelihood Enhancement and Sustainable Food Production.
- Gillian Frances Hillier, Lately Deputy Director, Free Schools (North), University Technical Colleges and Studio Schools Capital, Education Funding Agency. For services to Education.
- Patricia Ann Hodge, Actress. For services to Drama.
- The Very Reverend Dr. Elizabeth Lorna Hood. For services to the Church of Scotland and charity.
- Katharine Horler, Chief Executive, Adviza and Chair, Careers England. For services to Further Education.
- Philip Horrocks, Grade 7, Ministry of Defence. For services to Defence.
- Dr. Kamaljit Kaur Hothi, Head of Colleague Volunteering and Group Fundraising, Lloyds Banking Group. For services to Diversity in the Banking Sector.
- Catherine Anne Howell, Chief Nurse, Diagnostic and Therapeutic Services, NHS Blood and Transplant. For services to Nursing.
- Geraldine Lesley Howley, chief executive officer, Incommunities. For services to Housing, Young People and the community in Bradford.
- Louise Hubble, Police Inspector, Hampshire Constabulary. For services to the Rural communities in Hampshire and the Isle of Wight.
- Dr. Nicholas Hughes. For services to Innovation in Africa.
- Mary Winifred Gloria Hunniford. For services to Cancer charities through Breast Screening Services and Cancer Support.
- Professor Nigel Peter Hunt, Head of Orthodontic Department, Eastman Dental Institute, University College London. For services to Dentistry and to the Specialty of Orthodontics.
- Thomas Hurst, chief investment officer, Sunderland City Council. For services to Local Government and Economic Prosperity through Inward Investment.
- Ogheneruona Mercy Iguyovwe, Senior Specialist Prosecutor, International Justice and Organised Crime Division, Crown Prosecution Service. For services to Law and Order.
- Alison Jane Inman, JP. For services to Social Housing Tenants in Essex.
- Professor Emily Jackson, FBA, Professor of Law and vice-chair, Academic Board, London School of Economics. For services to Higher Education.
- Glenys Jackson, Director, Merchant Navy Training Board. For services to Recruitment and Training.
- Dr. Patricia Denise Jackson. For services to Children with Additional Support Needs and charity.
- Gillian Olive May James, Headteacher, St Mary's CofE(A) Primary School, Staffordshire. For services to Education.
- Jacqueline Jenks, Chief Executive, Leapfrog Mountain. For services to Training, Project Management and People Development.
- Brendan James Joyce, chief executive officer, Norfolk Wildlife Trust. For services to Wildlife Conservation in Norfolk.
- Natasha Kaplinsky, Broadcaster. For services to Holocaust Commemoration.
- Arvind Michael Kapur, DL, Chairman, National Space Centre and Founder and director, Signum Corporate Communications Ltd. For services to Science, Technology, Business and Enterprise.
- Chandrakant Kataria, Group Chief Executive, East Midlands Housing Group. For services to Housing in the East Midlands.
- Idris Khan. For services to Art.
- Philip Andrew Kimberley, Lately Chair, England Hockey. For services to Hockey.
- Keith Charles Knowles, Chief Executive, Beds and Bars. For services to the community and charity.
- Dr. Nikesh Kotecha, chief executive officer, Morningside Pharmaceuticals. For services to Entrepreneurship, Innovation in Pharmaceutical Services and Philanthropy.
- Richard James Lake, Owner and Chief Executive, Eastern Airways and Humberside Airport. For services to Aviation.
- Patrick Lamb, Lately Arabian Peninsula Iraq Department, Foreign and Commonwealth Office. For services to supporting the Government Legal Service
- Sarah-Jane Abigail Lancashire. For services to Drama.
- Joan Lawton, Independent Member, TACT Adoption and Permanence Panel and Member, TACT Board of Trustees. For services to Adoption.
- Timothy Patterson Lefroy. For services to the Advertising Industry.
- Dr. Nigel William Leigh, Principal and Chief Executive, Stephenson College. For services to Further Education and Apprenticeships.
- Anthony Rhydian Lewis, Peer to Peer and Financial Inclusion Innovator. For services to Financial Services.
- Dr. Robert William Lewis, Director, TotalSim. For services to Science Applied to Sport.
- Richard Lister, Vice-Chancellor, University of Suffolk. For services to Higher Education.
- Martyn Lloyd-Evans, Lately Police Staff, Head of Review Unit, South Wales Police. For services to the Serious Crime Review Group.
- Norman Robert Lynas, Chairman, Lynas Foodservice. For services to the Business Sector, to charity and the community in Northern Ireland.
- Morag Dorothy Mackellar, Allied Health Professionals Children's Services Manager, NHS Forth Valley. For services to Dietetics, the Dietetic Profession and Public Health.
- Dr. Kerry Jean Mashford, Chief Executive, National Energy Foundation. For services to the Energy Industry.
- Professor Malcolm David Mason. For services to the NHS and Cancer Research.
- Margaret Mason, Founder and Executive Chair, Children 1st Day Nurseries Group. For services to Education.
- Maria McCaffery, MBE, Lately chief executive officer, RenewableUK. For services to the Renewable Energy Sector.
- Catherine Brenda McCallum, Director, Rural Affairs, Department of Agriculture, Environment and Rural Affairs, Northern Ireland Executive. For services to Government and the community.
- Gillian Lesley McCarthy, Director, Operational Policy and Performance, Advisory, Conciliation and Arbitration Service. For services to Employers and Employees.
- Susan Bridget McDermott, National Director and non-executive director, Rainbows Bereavement Support GB. For services to Education.
- Francesca Jane McDonagh, Head, Retail Banking and Wealth Management, HSBC. For services to Banking.
- Nona McDuff, Director of Equality, Diversity and Inclusion, Kingston University. For services to Higher Education.
- Dr. Ramesh Dulichandbhai Mehta, President, British Association of Physicians of Indian Origin. For services to the NHS.
- Professor Colin Mellors. For services to Economic Development in Yorkshire.
- Heather Patricia Melville, Director for Strategic Partnerships, Royal Bank of Scotland. For services to Gender Equality.
- David John Mepham – UK Director, Human Rights Watch. For services to Human Rights
- Peter Meredith-Smith, Associate Director, Employment Relations, Royal College of Nursing (Wales). For services to Nursing in Wales.
- Linda Jean Miller, Project Manager, Crossrail. For services to Engineering and to Promoting Gender Equality.
- Dr. Elizabeth Mitchell, Chief Executive, Institute of Public Health in Northern Ireland. For services to Public Health.
- Valerie Theresa Moore, chief executive officer, Rightforsuccess Academy Trust and Executive Head, Eaton Hall Specialist Academy, Norwich. For services to Education.
- Patricia Moran, Headteacher, Lionel Road Primary School, Brentford, London. For services to Education.
- Amanda Rose Mordey, Headteacher, Merstone Special School and Forest Oak Special School, Solihull. For services to Special Educational Needs and Disability.
- Gwyneth Anne Rhoda Morgan, Founder, Prisoner's Penfriends. For services to the Rehabilitation of Prisoners.
- Paul Palmer Mullins, Lately chairman, Industrial Development Advisory Board and chairman, Education and Training Foundation. For services to Business and the Economy.
- Alexander Murray, Chief Superintendent, West Midlands Police. For services to Evidence-based Policing.
- Judith Mary Murray. For services to Tennis, Women in Sport and charity.
- David Richard Newell. For services to the Newspaper and Publishing Industries.
- Gillian Collins Norton, DL, Lately Chief Executive, London Borough of Richmond Upon Thames. For services to Local Government.
- Chi-Chi Nwanoku, MBE, Musician. For services to Music.
- Maureen Okoye, Headteacher, Davies Lane Primary School, Leytonstone, London. For services to Education.
- Dr. Kathryn Oldham, Head of Resilience, Civil Contingencies and Resilience Unit, Association of Greater Manchester Authorities. For services to Local Government.
- Jonathan Mark O'Neill, managing director, Fire Protection Association. For services to Fire Safety.
- Nicholas Ronald Ormerod. For services to Theatre Design.
- Professor Clive Peter Page, Professor of Pharmacology and Head of Sackler Institute of Pulmonary, King's College London. For services to Pharmacology.
- Angela Paget, Lately Headteacher, St Bede's Catholic Junior School, Widnes. For services to Education.
- Dr. Sarah Amanda Pape, Consultant Plastic Surgeon, Royal Victoria Infirmary Newcastle Upon Tyne. For services to the treatment of burns patients in the UK and Romania
- Dr. Alison Parken. For services to Equality and Diversity.
- Margaret Parks, Chief Executive, Women's Rape and Sexual Abuse Centre, Cornwall. For services to Victims of Sexual and Domestic Abuse.
- Harinder Singh Pattar, Headteacher, The Heathland School, London. For services to Education.
- Clive Robert Peckover, Head, Family Policy, Immigration and Border Policy Directorate, Home Office. For services to Policy on Family, Asylum and Sham Marriages.
- Nigel Graham Peters, Director, Development Aid, British Expertise International. For services to UK export promotion in Eastern Europe and Central Asia
- Helen Ann Phillips, Business Change and Delivery Manager, Cymru Wales, Crown Prosecution Service. For services to Law and Order.
- Wendy Joy Phillips. For services to International Development.
- Dr. Cheryll Denise Pitt, Senior Executive Officer, Ministry of Defence. For services to Aviation Safety.
- Polly Susannah Athenais Purvis, Chief Executive, ScotlandIS. For services to the Digital Economy in Scotland.
- Mohammad Shahed Quraishi, Consultant Ear, Nose and Throat Surgeon and Director ENT Masterclass, Doncaster and Bassetlaw Hospitals. For services to the NHS and Medical Education.
- Emily Ramsay For services to Improving Health and Safety in the Forestry and Arboriculture Industries.
- Marsha Rae Ratcliff. For charitable services.
- Dr. Fiona Elizabeth Rayment, Director for Fuel Cycle Solutions, National Nuclear Laboratory. For services to UK Nuclear Research and Innovation.
- Anna Maria Richardson, Researcher and Analyst, Crime and Policing Analysis, Home Office. For services to Drugs and Alcohol Evidence-based Policy.
- Peter Richardson, Chairman, Derby, Derbyshire, Nottingham, Nottinghamshire Local Enterprise Partnership. For services to Enterprise and Growth in Nottingham.
- Karen Riley. Lately Headteacher, Frank Barnes School for Deaf Children, Camden, London. For services to Special Educational Needs and Disabilities.
- Jillian Rosemary, Lady Ritblat. For services to Arts Philanthropy.
- Beverley Rose Robinson, Principal and Chief Executive, Blackpool and the Fylde College. For services to Further Education.
- Bernadette Roobottom, Lately Headteacher, Shobnall Primary School, Staffordshire. For services to Education.
- Antony David Ross, Director, Bridges Fund Management Limited. For services to Social Enterprise and Investment.
- Margaret Katherine Ross, Lately Senior Lecturer for Dental Care Professionals, University of Edinburgh. For services to Dentistry.
- Paul John Russell, Grade 7. For services to Defence.
- Sarah Emily Ruston, Author. For services to Adoption.
- David Rutter, Head, Armed Forces and Veterans' Health Policy Team. For services to the Health of Members of the Armed Forces, Reservists, their Families and Veterans.
- Professor David Roy Sandbach, Director, National Innovation Centre for Ageing, Newcastle University. For services to Science, Innovation and Skills.
- Clive Antonio Saunders. For services to the community, Education and Equality.
- Councillor Isobel Seccombe, Leader, Warwickshire County Council. For services to Local Government.
- Nardeep Sharma, Chief Executive Officer, The Thrive Partnership Academy Trust, Executive Principal, Colne Community College and Philip Morant School and College, Essex. For services to Education.
- Rakesh Sharma, Chief Executive, Ultra Electronics. For services to Defence Capability.
- Hugh Shaw, Secretary of State's Representative for Maritime Salvage and Intervention, Department for Transport. For services to Maritime Safety.
- Caroline Diana Burnell Sheppard (Trotter), Chief Adjudicator, Traffic Penalty Tribunal. For services to Motorists.
- Graham Shields, Lately Chief Electoral Officer for Northern Ireland. For services to Electoral Democracy.
- Dr. Richard John Simpson. For services to Scottish Politics and Public Life.
- Laura Ann Pender Smith. For services to Disability Sports.
- Paul Frank Soames, Lately Deputy chief executive officer, Contact a Family, London. For services to Children.
- David James Spencer, First Secretary, Foreign and Commonwealth Office. For services to national security
- Wendy Patricia Spinks, Commercial Director, St Pancras International Station. For services to Rail.
- Anthony Stacey, Chief Executive, South Yorkshire Housing Association and Chair, Placeshapers Group of Housing Associations. For services to Housing.
- Heather Mary Stanning, MBE, Lately Rower. For services to Rowing.
- David Rutherford Stewart, Business Unit Head, HM Revenue and Customs. For services to the Promotion of Investment in Northern Ireland.
- Alastair Dunbar Storey. For services to the Hospitality Industry.
- Peter Stout. For services to Young People and to the community in the North East.
- Margaret Sumner, Headteacher, Brook Special Primary School, Tottenham, London. For services to Special Educational Needs and Disabilities.
- Ashley Daniel Tabor, Founder and Executive President, Global. For services to the Media Industry.
- Ann Edith Templeton, Assistant Director, State Aid Team, Department for Business, Energy and Industrial Strategy. For services to Government and State Aid.
- Richard Thomason, Grade 7, Ministry of Defence. For services to Defence.
- Philippa Hilary Jane Todd, Senior Fiscal Analyst, Office of Budget Responsibility. For services to Public Finances and Transparency.
- Austin William Treacy, Governor, Northern Ireland Prison Service. For services to Reducing Re-offending and to Community Safety.
- Professor Jane Margaret Turner, Pro Vice-Chancellor for Enterprise and Business Engagement, Teesside University. For services to Business Engagement.
- Adrian Brian Turpin, Artistic Director, Wigtown Book Festival. For services to Literature and the Economy in Wigtownshire.
- Caroline Underwood, Founder and chief executive officer, Philanthropy Company. For charitable services.
- Professor Mahendra Pratap Singh Varma. For services to Cardiology in Northern Ireland.
- Pascale Vassie, Executive Director, National Resource Centre for Supplementary Education. For services to Education.
- Sandeep Singh Virdee, Founder and director, Darbar Arts Culture and Heritage Trust. For services to the Promotion of Indian Musical Heritage in the UK.
- David Walliams. For services to charity and the Arts.
- Professor Lynda May Warren, Lately Deputy Chair, Committee on Radioactive Waste Management. For services to Environmental Protection in the UK and Abroad.
- Melanie Dawn Waters, Lately chief executive officer, The Poppy Factory. For services to ex-Service Personnel.
- Robert Watt. For services to International Development.
- Professor Tom Welton, Dean, Faculty of Natural Sciences, Imperial College London. For services to Diversity and Education.
- Jacqueline Mary Westwood, Director, UK Genetic Testing Network, London. For services to Medical Genetics and the community in Kent.
- Thomas Anthony Whitfield, Director of Finance, Leeds Teaching Hospitals NHS Trust. For services to the NHS.
- Roderick Gregory Coleman Williams. For services to Music.
- Dr. Roisin Sharon Willmott, For services to Planning in Wales.
- Adrian Wootton, Chief Executive, Film London. For services to Film.
- Dr. Jaswinder Singh (Jason) Wouhra, Chair, Institute of Directors, West Midlands and Director & company secretary, East End Foods Plc. For services to business and international trade
- Gerald Edwin Yates, President, National Conservative Convention. For voluntary political services.
- John Sutherland Yates, Head of Strategy, Performance & Insight, British Council. For services to the UK's international and cultural relationships
- Dr. Edward Max Ziff, Chairman, Town Centre Securities. For services to the Economy and the community in Leeds.

==== Member of the Order of the British Empire (MBE) ====
- Olufunke Abimbola. For services to Diversity in the Legal Profession and to Young People.
- Michele Angela Adams. For services to Girls' and Women's Football in Wales.
- Paul Matthew Adams, Lately Grade 7, Assessment, Curriculum and Qualifications Group, Department for Education. For services to the Department for Education and to the community in Basildon.
- Ruth Elizabeth Airdrie, Founder, Rainbow Living. For services to Adults with Learning Disabilities.
- Evelyn Isabel Aitken, Owner, Fergushill Riding Stables. For services to Equestrianism and Riding for the Disabled in North Ayrshire.
- Sharon Margaret Aitken, Principal Teacher, Special Education Department, Buckie High School. For services to Children with Special Needs and the community in Buckie, Banffshire.
- Norma Alcock, Volunteer, NSPCC. For services to Vulnerable Children.
- Saeeda Ali, Higher Executive Officer, Ministry of Defence. For services to Defence.
- William Bruce Allan, Principal Teacher, Physical Education, Buckhaven High School, Levenmouth. For services to Youth Rugby and charity.
- Judith Elizabeth Allen. For voluntary service to the community in Northern Ireland.
- Julie Ann Allen, Headteacher, Birkwood Primary School, Barnsley. For services to Education.
- John Bradbury Allinson. For services to the Tadworth and Walton Overseas Aid Trust.
- Francesca Therese Andrews, Legal Directorate, Foreign and Commonwealth Office. For services to Human Rights and the Rule of Law
- Dr. Kofi Arfu Anie, Honorary Clinical Senior Lecturer, Imperial College London. For services to People with Sickle Cell Disease and Thalassaemia.
- Amma Asante, Writer and Director. For services to Film.
- Mohammad Ashfaq, Founder and Managing Director, Kikit Pathways to Recovery, Birmingham. For services to Vulnerable People.
- Samera Jabeen Ashraf. For services to Sport and Diversity.
- Francis Gordon Askew, Lately Literacy and Phonics Adviser, Department for Education. For services to Education.
- Lynne Ann Atkin, HR Director, Barclays UK and Global Head of Employee Relations, Barclays Bank. For services to Human Resources in the Banking Sector.
- Shazia Azhar, Member, Diverse Leaders Network. For services to Education.
- William Edward Hampshire Bagnall, Governor and Chair, Finance and Strategy Committee, The Sixth Form College Farnborough, Hampshire. For services to Education.
- Dr. John Baker, Chair of Governors, Queen Boudica Primary School, Essex, and National Leader of Governance. For services to Education.
- Andrew Donald Ballantyne, Managing Director, C-Software Ltd. For services to Defence.
- Andy Banks. For services to Diving.
- Nigel Barclay, Attaché, Agriculture and Fisheries, UK Representation to the European Union. For services to UK relations with the European Union and Belgium
- Benjamin Barker. For services to the community in Greater Bedminster, Bristol.
- Christopher Barmby. For services to Policing and the community.
- Jennifer Ann Barnes. For voluntary service to Disabled People in Monmouthshire.
- Ralph Gunther Bauer, Chair, Franklin Group. For services to Textiles Manufacturing in Northern Ireland.
- Louise Baxter-Scott, Scams Team Manager, National Trading Standards. For services to Protecting Vulnerable People from Financial Abuse.
- Dr. Paul Bennett. For services to Archaeology.
- John Beresford, Volunteer, Show Racism the Red Card Campaign. For services to Education.
- Jennifer Bridget Billington, Deputy Headteacher, Sir Tom Finney Community High School, Preston. For services to Special Educational Needs and Disabilities.
- Anne Carolyn Binney. For services to Wildlife and the Arts.
- John Binns, Mental Health Champion, London. For services to Mental Health.
- Patricia Kathleen Black, Lately Senior Lecturer, St Mark's Hospital, Harrow, London North West Healthcare NHS Trust. For services to Stoma Care Nursing.
- Lt Col Robert Henry Lynn Blomfield, TD, Chairman, Northamptonshire Reserve Forces and Cadets Association. For services to the Reserves and Cadets.
- Peter Alan Blyth, Higher Executive Officer, Ministry of Defence. For services to the Reserve Forces and Cadets on Tyneside.
- Roberta Margaret Bolt (Mrs Morris), Lately Deputy Chief Operating Officer, Aneurin Bevan University Health Board.
- Dean Robert Bolton, Director, Eye Watch Security Ltd. For services to Business and the community in Scunthorpe.
- Reece Andrew Bolton-Locke, Human Resources Manager, Foreign and Commonwealth Office. For services to national security
- Georgina Felicia Tutuaa Bondzi-Simpson, Chair of Governors, Kingsbury High School. For services to Education.
- Janice Mary Boswell. For voluntary service and services to the community in Bromsgrove, Worcestershire.
- David John Boutcher. For services to Children's Charity and for Advocating Charitable Corporate Involvement.
- Heather Bowry, Head of Group Management Support. For services to HM Treasury.
- Jane Annabelle Boyes, Receiver General and Canon Treasurer, Winchester Cathedral. For services to the Church.
- Anne Campbell Bradley. For charitable services in Warwickshire.
- Katrina Brennan, Stroke Managed Clinical Network Manager, NHS Lanarkshire. For services to Stroke Care in Scotland.
- Emily Sophie Hastings Brooke, Founder and CEO, Blaze. For services to the Economy and Transport.
- Margaret Ann Brookes. For services to Guiding and Young People in Stockport.
- Paul Lawrence Brown, Mechanical Instrumentation Workshop Manager, Imperial College London. For services to Higher Education.
- Susan Jean Brown, Lately Nurse Consultant, Connective Tissue Diseases, Royal National Hospital for Rheumatic Diseases, Bath. For services to Nursing.
- Junier Browne, Lately Environment and Business Senior Advisor, Environment Agency. For services to the Environment, Diversity and the community in Leeds.
- Karen Bryson (Mrs McMahon), Actress. For services to Drama.
- Gwyneth Noelle Buchanan, Sergeant, Police Service of Northern Ireland. For services to Policing and the community in Northern Ireland.
- Paul Burgess. For services to People with Disabilities and the community in Birmingham.
- Carole Lesley Burgoyne, Strategic Director for People, Plymouth City Council. For services to Children and Young People.
- Elizabeth Burton-Phillips, Founder, DrugFAM. For services to People who Experience Drug Addiction and their Families.
- Pamela Jean Butcher. For services to Table Tennis.
- Dr. Rachel Butler. For services to the Development of Genomics in Wales and across the UK.
- Dr. John Buttrick, Lately Director and Honorary President, Hull Children's University. For services to Children in Hull.
- Emily Katherine Venetia Byron. For services to Children, Young People and the community through the New London Performing Arts Centre.
- Dr. Jill Marie Cainey, Chief Executive, Electricity Storage Network. For services to Energy Technology and the community in Wiltshire.
- Jacqueline Cairnie, Unit Manager, Greendykes Early Years Centre. For services to Vulnerable Children and their Families in East Edinburgh.
- Margaret Anne Calland. For services to the community in Thorpe Hesley, South Yorkshire.
- John Murray Cameron, Trustee, RUCGC Foundation. For voluntary service to the community in Northern Ireland.
- William James Campbell. For services to Agriculture.
- Ronald Nicholas Cannon, Lifeboatman, RNLI Ramsgate. For services to Maritime Safety.
- Robert James Kennedy Cardwell. For services to the RNLI and the community in Northern Ireland.
- Teresa Anne Carpenter, Foster Carer, Kent County Council. For services to Children and Families.
- Patricia Carrington, Principal and Head of Service, City College Peterborough. For services to Further Education and to the community in Peterborough.
- Diane Christine Carroll, Trustee Director, Remploy Ltd Pension and Assurance Scheme. For services to People with Disabilities.
- Cheryl June Cates, Disability Champion, Criminal Casework, Immigration Enforcement, Home Office. For services to Equality and Diversity.
- Victoria Jean Chalmers, Founder and Lead Practitioner, Time 4 Children. For services to Children's Emotional Well-being.
- Lynda Chamberlain, Security Manager, Anglian Water. For services to Water Supply Resilience.
- Aqila Choudhry. For public and political service.
- Dr. Pushpinder Chowdhry. For services to the Asian community in the UK.
- Kevin Christopher Clancy, Lately Head of Construction, York College. For services to Further Education.
- Mary Teresa Clancy, SENCO Coordinator, St Gregory's Catholic Science College, Harrow. For services to Special Educational Needs and Disabilities.
- Linda Susan Clark, JP. For voluntary service in the West Midlands.
- Susan Clark, Chair and Fundraiser, Pegasus Playscheme, Dover. For services to Children with Disabilities.
- Gillian Clipson, Lately Deputy Chief Executive, Association of Colleges. For services to Further Education.
- Professor David Coates, Director of Life Sciences, Learning and Teaching, University of Dundee. For services to Biology.
- Andrew Gordon Cochrane, Founder, Noble Caledonia. For services to Tourism.
- Christopher John Collier, Business Board Chair, NSPCC Peterborough. For services to Children and Young People.
- Sean Connolly, Intelligence Analyst, HM Revenue and Customs. For services to Innovation and Tackling Organised Crime.
- Dr. Richard George Cooke, Staff Scientist, Smithsonian Tropical Research Institute. For services to archaeology and the understanding of ancient Central American civilisation
- John Anthony Conteh. For services to Boxing.
- Patrick Joseph Conway, Works Convenor, AugustaWestland Ltd. For services to Industrial Relations and the community in Yeovil, Somerset.
- June Cook. For services to charity and the community in Kirkbymoorside, North Yorkshire.
- Dr. Philip Anthony Cooper, Nurse Consultant in Dual Diagnosis, North West Boroughs Healthcare and NHS Foundation Trust. For services to Nursing.
- Stuart Richard Copley, Manager, International Liaison Officer, Pakistan, National Crime Agency. For services to Law Enforcement and International Relationships.
- Elizabeth Iris Corry, Volunteer, The Salvation Army. For charitable services to the community.
- Alan Corry-Finn, Vice-President, Northern Ireland Hospice and Director of Nursing, Primary Care and Older People Western Health and Social Care Trust. For services to Healthcare.
- Barrie Cottingham. For services to the Boys and Girls Clubs in South Yorkshire.
- Anthony Crane. For services to Music, charity and the community in Merseyside.
- Michael John Creighton. For political and public service.
- Professor Thomas Crick. For services to Computer Science and the Promotion of Computer Science Education.
- Ethna Philomena Cummins, Lately Headteacher, Whitefield Infant School and Nursery, Lancashire. For services to Education.
- Patricia Mary Cunningham. For voluntary political service.
- Brian Kenneth John Dallamore, Chair of Trustees of the British School Jakarta. For services to education and sport in Indonesia
- Susan Janet Dare, Lately Principal and chief executive officer, Northbrook College, Sussex. For services to Education.
- Edward Davenport, Foster Carer, Trafford Borough Council. For services to Children and Families.
- Jean Davenport, Foster Carer, Trafford Borough Council. For services to Children and Families.
- Christopher Davies, Higher Executive Officer, Ministry of Defence. For services to Drugs Awareness in the Armed Forces.
- Michael John Davies. For services to Business and Disadvantaged Children in North Yorkshire.
- Michelle Rebecca Davies, Domestic Abuse and Sexual Violence Strategy Manager, Cornwall Fire, Rescue and Community Safety Service. For services to Victims of Domestic Abuse and Sexual Violence.
- Steven Davis, Captain, Northern Ireland Football Team. For services to Football.
- Ian Charles Dean. For services to Music.
- John Anthony Delaney. For services to the Teenage Cancer Trust.
- Vilasgauri Ratilal Dhanani. For voluntary and charitable services.
- James Andrew Dick, Lately Chair of Trustees and Governors, Moor House School and College, Hurst Green, Surrey. For services to Special Educational Needs and Disabilities.
- Gillian Mary Dinsmore, Lately Vice-Chair, Music in Hospitals UK and Convenor Music in Hospitals Scotland. For services to Music and charity.
- Marina Ann Dolman, President, Bristol City Football Club. For services to Football.
- Professor Claire Alice Mary Domoney, Head of Department, Metabolic Biology, John Innes Centre. For services to Crop Science and Improvement of the Pea Crop in the UK.
- John Joseph Donnelly, Chairman, SDC Trailers. For services to Economic Development in Northern Ireland.
- Helen Fleure Dorey, Deputy Director, Sir John Soane's Museum. For services to Heritage.
- Janet Lorraine Down, Chief Executive, SoLO Life Opportunities. For services to Children and Young People with Special Needs in the West Midlands.
- Darrilyn Downes, Teacher, Forest Oak School, Birmingham. For services to Special Educational Needs and Disabilities.
- Captain Jeremy Leslie Drewitt, Lately Harbour Master, PD Ports Limited. For services to the welfare of Seafarers on Teesside.
- Edward Guy Dru Drury, Head of Confederation of British Industry, China. For services to promoting British business in China
- Janet Dullaghan, Head of Commissioning for Children's Health and Wellbeing, Peterborough Borough Council and Founder, Dreamdrops. For services to Children's Wellbeing.
- John Dunn, Marine Scientist. For services to the Promotion of Marine Science and Education.
- Lieutenant Colonel Richard Harris East. For services to charity and the community in Dorchester, Dorset.
- Joanne Idonia Eccles. For services to Equestrian Vaulting.
- Jean Edusei. For services to Girlguiding and to Young People in Ghana.
- Gabrielle Anne Lynam Edwards. For services to the community in the Isle of Wight.
- Ndidi Ekubia. For services to Silversmithing.
- David Ellis, Lately Chairman, Falmouth Harbour Commissioners. For services to the Economy and the community in Cornwall.
- Richard Empson, President of the British Society in Uruguay. For services to UK interests and the British community in Uruguay
- Babak Erfani, Chairman, Archway – the Lesbian, Gay, Bisexual and Transgender Network. For services to Network Rail and Diversity in Transport.
- Sonia Mentena Evans, Foster Carer, Royal Borough of Kensington and Chelsea. For services to Children and Families.
- Susan Evans. For services to Disabled People in Merseyside.
- Alderman Allan George Ewart. For services to Local Government and the community in Northern Ireland.
- Nicholas David John Eyre, Educator, British Council, Spain. For services to the global teaching of the English language
- Matthew Fairey, Second Secretary, Foreign and Commonwealth Office. For services to national security
- Sheila Fairhurst, Co-founder, CarlyFund.co.uk. For services to People who have Suffered Domestic Abuse.
- Trevor Fairhurst, Co-founder, CarlyFund.co.uk. For services to People who have Suffered Domestic Abuse.
- David Annunzio Michele Falzani, President, Sainsbury Management Fellows. For services to Engineering and Enterprise.
- Eamon Joseph Fanning, Senior Officer, Maritime, Aviation and Military Intervention Cell, National Crime Agency. For services to Law Enforcement and charity.
- Michael Roger Farrant. For voluntary service to the community in London.
- Marion Jean Faust, Chair of Governors, Brampton Manor Academy. For services to Education.
- Elspeth Finch, Entrepreneur, Founder and chief executive officer, Indigo&. For services to Engineering and Enterprise.
- Professor Anthony Colin Fisher, Consultant Clinical Scientist, Head of Department and director, Merseyside, Royal Liverpool University Hospital. For services to Medical Physics and Clinical Engineering.
- Michael Fitzgerald. For services to Homeless People and the community in Maidstone, Kent.
- Terry Flanagan. For services to Rugby League and to charity in the North West.
- Tyrone Leon Francis, Executive Vice-President and Group Publisher, Ethisphere Institute. For services to promoting business in Wales
- Steven John Frankham. For services to Business and to charity in South East England.
- George Arthur Fromow, Senior Medical Laboratory Scientific Officer, Gibraltar. For services to Haematology
- Elizabeth Gage, Jeweller. For services to Business.
- Claire Rashleigh Garnett, Founder, Peebles Orchestra and Peebles Youth Orchestra. For services to Music in the community in the Scottish Borders.
- Eileen Garvey. For services to Women who have Suffered Domestic Violence and Abuse in Buckinghamshire.
- Antony Simm Gearing. For services to Young People in the UK.
- Sahana Gero. For services to Music and the community in South London.
- Charles Gething Lewis. For services to the Samaritans and the community in Herefordshire.
- Natalie Dawn Gilmour. For services to Women's Rugby League.
- Lucy Elizabeth Glenn, Deployment Manager, Foreign and Commonwealth Office. For services to national security
- Dawn Alison Good, Head of Stroke Service and Lead Stroke Nurse, Nottingham University Hospitals NHS Trust. For services to Nursing.
- Jeanette Gilchrist Gordon, Higher Executive Officer, Department for Work and Pensions. For services to DWP and the community in East Ayrshire.
- Harriet Anne Granville, Lately History Teacher, Tudor Hall School, Banbury. For services to Education.
- Gordon Cuthbert Griffin. For services to People with Sight Impairment.
- Elizabeth Griffith, Policy Officer, Law Centre NI. For services to Vulnerable People.
- Romayne Ida Mary Grigorova. For services to Dance.
- Derek Groves, Physical Education Specialist, HM Prison Hull. For services to HM Prison Service and to Paralympic Sport.
- Elizabeth Anne Guillebaud, Great Lakes Outreach. For services to development in Burundi
- Simon Mark Guillebaud, International Director of Great Lakes Outreach, Bujumbura, Burundi. For services to development in Burundi
- Capt (Rtd) Gaubahadur Gurung, Executive Officer, Ministry of Defence. For services in Support of Service Personnel.
- Kimberly Jane Hager, Joint Commissioning Manager (Drugs and Alcohol), Cornwall Fire, Rescue and Community Safety Service. For services to public safety.
- Barbara Elizabeth Hale, Foster Carer, Sandwell Metropolitan Borough Council. For services to Children and Families.
- Martin Alan Hale, Foster Carer, Sandwell Metropolitan Borough Council. For services to Children and Families.
- Doreen Anne Hall, Councillor, South Lakeland District Council. For services to the community in the Lake District.
- Asif Hamid, Chief Executive Officer, The Contact Company and Chair, Wirral Chamber of Commerce. For services to Small and Medium Sized Businesses.
- Scott Denny Hann, Gymnastics Coach. For services to Gymnastics.
- Dr. Robert William Hardeman, Deputy Chair, NI Science Industry Panel. For services to the Advanced Manufacturing, Materials and Engineering Sector in Northern Ireland.
- Bethan Zoe Harding, Headteacher, Herbert Thompson Primary School, Cardiff. For services to Education.
- Gary Anthony Hardman. For services to the Lesbian, Gay, Bisexual and Transgender Community in Greater Manchester.
- Paul Edward Harper, Lately Team Leader, Social Work Reform, Children's Services, Department for Education. For services to the Department for Education.
- Nigel Patrick Harris, JP, Director, Camden LGBT Forum. For services to the LGBT community.
- Kathleen Isobel Hartshorne. For services to the community in Pontesbury, Shropshire.
- Claire Louise Harvey, Senior Consultant, KPMG, GB Paralympian and Chair, Anti Homophobia and Transphobia Steering Group. For services to Diversity, Inclusion and Sport.
- Amy Denise Hathaway, Project Director, Forever Projects, Mwanza, Tanzania. For services to providing interim and community care for abandoned and vulnerable infants in Mwanza
- Dorothy Haw. For services to the community in Sheffield, South Yorkshire.
- Antony Gordon Hawksworth, Comedian and writer. For services to disadvantaged children in Moldova
- Stella Maris Hayes. For services to the Samaritans, particularly at HM Prison Preston, Lancashire.
- Pamal Jeet Hayre, Lately Private Secretary, Home Office. For public service.
- Dian Joyce Heaney. For voluntary service to the community in Craigavon, Northern Ireland.
- Columb Henry, DL, JP. For services to the community in Northern Ireland.
- Margaret Patricia Stuart Henton, Lately Non-Executive Director, Coal Authority. For services to the Environment and Professional Education.
- Gareth Higgins, Managing Director, KMF Precision Sheet Metal Ltd. For services to Apprenticeships.
- Pauline Anne Hill, Foster Carer, Cheviots Children's Disability Service, Enfield. For services to Children and Families.
- Roger Anthony Hill, Foster Carer, Cheviots Children's Disability Service, Enfield. For services to Children and Families.
- Philip John Hirst. For services to charity and the community in Wigan.
- Barbara Anne Hodkinson, Founder, Butterfly Scheme, Yorkshire. For services to People with Dementia.
- Alyson Hogg, Founder and Owner, Vita Liberata. For services to Economic Development in Northern Ireland.
- Dr. John Alan Holmes. For services to charities in Nottinghamshire.
- Meryl Homer, Pre-School Manager, St Alphege Church of England Pre-School and Manager, Little Treasures and 2's Group. For services to Early Years Education.
- Keith Hopkins. For services to charity and the community in Kirriemuir, Angus.
- Kevin Thomas Horkin. For services to charity and to the community in Clitheroe, Lancashire.
- Lee Hough, Advanced Nurse Practitioner, The White Rose Surgery, West Yorkshire. For services to Nursing.
- Raymond Charles Howard, Councillor, Essex County Council. For services to Local Government and the community in Canvey Island.
- William Martin Howard, Volunteer. For services to education in India
- John Wallace Howie. For services to Business and the Economy.
- Kate Hubbard, First Secretary, Foreign and Commonwealth Office. For services to international security
- Barry Hudson. For voluntary service to the community and Rowing.
- Dr. Sean Terence Hudson, Co-founder, Expedition and Wilderness Medicine and Medical Lead, UKMed, Cumbria. For services to Providing Medical Aid and Education.
- Suzanne Leigh Hudson, Chief Executive, Bipolar UK. For services to People Affected by Bipolar Illness.
- Louise Hunter, Director of Corporate Affairs, Northumbrian Water Group. For services to Business Practice and Corporate Responsibility.
- Imam Monawar Hussain, Tutor and Imam. For services to Interfaith Relations and the community in Oxfordshire.
- Sally Jane Hyman, Chair of Trustees, RSPCA Llys Nini Branch. For services to Animal Welfare and the Environment.
- Ian William Edward Imlay. For services to Music in Leicester.
- Razia Ismail, Chair and Founder, Aaghee. For services to Women in the Asian community in Birmingham.
- Mohamed Amin Issa, Senior Lecturer, Ministry of Defence. For services to the Defence Centre for Languages and Culture.
- Abdul Jabbar. For political and public service.
- Glynis Sylvia James, Headteacher, Heronsbridge School, Bridgend. For services to Special Educational Needs.
- Surinder Singh Jandu. For services to Community Cohesion.
- Thomas Glyn Jenkins. For services to the community in Greater Manchester.
- Sylvia Jean Jenkinson. For services to the community in Bosley, Cheshire.
- Julie Jennings, Lately Manager, Children, Young People and Families, Royal National Institute of Blind People. For services to Children with Special Educational Needs and Disabilities.
- Gideon Jewel, Global President, Lear Corporation, For services to the Automotive Industry and charity.
- Peter John Sverre Johansen, Lately Chief Executive Officer and President, London Taxi Company. For services to the Automotive Industry and charity.
- Squadron Leader (Retd.) George Leonard Johnson, DFM. For services to World War II Remembrance and the community in Bristol.
- Mary Elizabeth (Moya) Johnston, Group Vice-President, OEM Businesses, Survitec Group Ltd. For services to Economic Development in Northern Ireland.
- Rosemary Johnston. For services to Music.
- Veryan Steele Johnston, Lately Executive Director, Human Resources, Newcastle University. For services to Higher Education.
- Brian Jones. For services to Glassblowing.
- Clara Audrey Jones. For services to the Women's Institute and to the community.
- Professor Fiona Jones, Professor of Rehabilitation Research, Kingston University and St George's University, London. For services to Stroke Rehabilitation.
- Jennifer Jones, Founder and Manager, Inspired Foundations. For services to Adoption.
- Dr. Nikita Kanani (Mrs Ferdinand), General Practitioner and chief clinical officer, NHS Bexley Clinical Commissioning Group. For services to Primary Care.
- Dr. Serbjit Kaur, Dentist, Leicestershire. For services to Dentistry.
- Stephen James Keeler, Operations Manager, Employment Agency Standards, Department for Business, Energy and Industrial Strategy. For services to Employment Rights.
- Dr. Kenna Kennedy (Kenna Campbell). For services to Promotion of the Gaelic Language, Music and Gaelic Medium Education.
- Marion Helen Kerley. For services to the community in Andover, Hampshire.
- Daniel Stuart Kerry. For services to Women's Hockey.
- Asif Amir Khan – For services to Architecture.
- Dr. Shah Noor Khan. For services to the Muslim community and Community Cohesion.
- Christopher Richard Kilroy, DL. For services to charity and the community in Bedfordshire.
- Christopher Peter Kirk, Deputy District Commissioner, Perth and Kinross District. For services to the Scouting Movement.
- Daniel Rayne Kruger, Chairman, Only Connect and the West London Zone for Children and Young People. For services to charity.
- Vikas Kumar. For services to the Arts and Culture.
- Adetola Kunle-Hassan, Founder, Nubian Skin. For services to Fashion.
- Michael Eric Lambell, JP. For services to the Magistracy and to St John Ambulance.
- Patricia Yvonne Angela Lamour. For services to Diversity.
- Diane Lampard. For services to Equestrianism.
- Elisabetta Lapenna-Huda, Entrepreneur, Founder and Chair, MyBnk. For services to Financial Services and Young People.
- Fiona Margaret Larg, Chief Operating Officer and Secretary, University of the Highlands and Islands. For services to Education in Scotland.
- Barry Leahey, Managing Director at Playdale Playgrounds Ltd. For services to UK trade and investment and exports
- Maurice William Lee. For services to Scouting in County Fermanagh, Northern Ireland.
- Anthony Douglas Leo, Radio Station Manager (retired), St Helena. For services to the community of St Helena
- Professor Christopher Terence Lewis. For services to Marine Science and Promoting Scientific Collaboration in the South West.
- Patricia Liddiard. For services to Young People in the UK and Abroad and to the community in Woodford Wells.
- Ernest Ian Lindley, Foster Carer, Doncaster. For services to Children and Families.
- Richard Howard Charles Lindley. For voluntary and charitable services.
- Christine Linnitt, Lately Head, Holywell Primary School, Loughborough. Elected Member of the Headteacher Board for the East Midlands and Humber. For services to Education.
- David John Lipman. For services to Liberal Judaism and the Jewish community in Nottingham.
- Sue Lister. For services to Equality, Diversity and the Arts in Yorkshire.
- Carolyn Little, Chair, Support in Mind Scotland. For services to Mental Healthcare.
- Denise Katherine Llewellyn, Lately Executive Nurse Director, Aneurin Bevan University Health Board. For services to Nursing in Wales.
- June Martha Marshall Logan. For services to Disability Sport.
- David Eric Long. For services to UK charities.
- Dr. Michael Paul Loosemore. For services to Sports Medicine.
- Anne Irene Love, Volunteer Manager, Western Health Social Care Trust. For services to the community in Northern Ireland.
- Derek Charles Lowden, Administrative Officer, Working Age Benefits, Department for Work and Pensions. For services to DWP and the community in Teddington, Middlesex.
- Alison Jayne Lowe. For services to the Fashion Industry.
- Professor Rebecca Lunn, Professor at the University of Strathclyde. For services to Science, Technology, Engineering and Mathematics.
- Professor Richard Mark Lyon, Consultant in Emergency Medicine, The Royal Infirmary of Edinburgh. For services to Emergency Healthcare.
- William John Mcleod Reid Mackie, Lately Convenor, Peterhead Port Authority. For services to the Fishing Industry.
- The Rev Roderick MacLeod. For services to the Gaelic Language and voluntary service in Argyll.
- Chris MacMeikan. For services to the Music Festival and Live Events Industry.
- Angus Stuart MacPherson. For services to the community in Wiltshire.
- Isabella MacGregor MacRae, Community Councillor, Dores and Essich. For services to the community in Inverness and the Highlands.
- Alun David Maddox. For services to charity and Education.
- Sandra Elizabeth Major, Lately Senior Caseworker to Jo Cox MP. For parliamentary services and service to the community in Batley and Spen, West Yorkshire.
- Angela Patricia Malone. For services to Wheelchair Curling.
- Cicily Icena Malone, Coordinator, Alternative Secondary Education Programme, British Virgin Islands. For services to education, the community and the church in the British Virgin Islands
- Tarek Fouad Malouf, Founder, Hummingbird Bakery. For services to Baking and Confectionery.
- Jennifer Ann Marshall, Principal, Belmont Nursery School, Londonderry. For services to Education.
- Professor Leo Martin, Chairman, St Margaret of Scotland Hospice, Clydebank. For services to Healthcare and Education.
- Isabel Jane Alexandra Martinson, Executive chairman, Considerate Constructors Scheme. For services to Business.
- Marjorie Maskrey. For services to the community in Birkenhead, Merseyside.
- Dr. Mark Mason, Lately Chief Executive Officer, Mubaloo. For services to the Digital Economy.
- Mary Elizabeth Matthews. For services to the Girl Guides and the Duke of Edinburgh Award Scheme.
- Neil Peter May, Senior Research Fellow, UCL and director, Sustainable Traditional Buildings Alliance. For services to Sustainability and Energy Efficiency in Buildings and Communities.
- Thomas William Mayberry. For services to Heritage.
- Gugulethu Sophia Mbatha-Raw, Actress. For services to Drama.
- David McAllister, Chairman, Lanarkshire Branch, SSAFA. For voluntary service to Service Personnel.
- Dawn McCarthy-Simpson, Director, Producers Alliance for Cinema and TV. For services to Exports.
- Laura McCartney, Assistant Director, Employment Services, Disability Action. For services to Disabled People and their Families in Northern Ireland.
- Dr. John Pender McClure, Chairman, the Scottish Cot Death Trust. For services to Paediatric Healthcare.
- Linda Ann McConnell, Founder, The Symphony of Dreams Charitable Trust. For services to charity.
- Eric James McGraw, Founder and lately Managing Editor, Inside Time. For services to the Rehabilitation of Prisoners in England and Wales.
- Catrina Ann McHugh. For services to Disadvantaged Women through Theatre.
- Pastor John McKee, Pastor, New Life City Church and director, City Life Centre. For services to the community in Shankill and Falls, Belfast.
- Philippa Jane McKerrow. For services to Guiding in London and the South East.
- James Crawford McLaren, Chair, Quality Meat Scotland. For services to the Farming Industry in Scotland.
- Valerie Jean McLea. For services to the community and Assisting Policing in Royal Wootton Bassett.
- Dr. Sharon Elizabeth Anne McMurray. For services to Children with Literacy Difficulties and to those with Special Educational Needs.
- Mary Elizabeth McNulty, Headteacher, St Roch's Primary and Hearing Impaired School. For services to Education and the Deaf community in Glasgow.
- Christine Mary Meadows, Foster Carer, Islington Council. For services to Children and Families.
- Annabel Mehta, President of Non Governmental Organisation, Apnalaya. For services to the community and under privileged in Mumbai, India
- Councillor Paul Stewart Metcalfe. For voluntary service to RNLI in Eastbourne.
- Mohammad Ajman Miah, Chef and Restaurateur. For services to the Hospitality Industry and charity.
- Loraine Midda, Head of Member Services (Lords), Parliamentary Digital Service. For parliamentary service and charitable service to Haven House Children's Hospice, Woodford Green, Essex.
- Frederick Milles, Executive Officer, Ministry of Defence. For services to Defence.
- Irene Milne, Higher Executive Officer, Ministry of Defence. For services in Support of Military Operations.
- Katherine Ann McKenzie Milne. For voluntary service Abroad.
- Robert John Mitchell, Emeritus Curator, St Andrews Botanic Garden. For services to Horticulture and Horticultural Education in Scotland.
- Vera May Mitchell, Volunteer, Plymouth Hospitals NHS Trust. For services to NHS Patients.
- Andrew Moffat, Assistant Headteacher, Parkfield Community School, Birmingham. For services to Equality and Diversity in Education.
- The Hon. Rosamond Mary Monckton. For voluntary and charitable services to People with Learning Disabilities and their Families in the UK and Abroad.
- Beryl Eileen Moppett. For services to the community in Solihull, West Midlands.
- David Frederick Morlidge. For services to the Arts and the community in Bolton.
- Majid Mukadam, Transplant Surgeon, Queen Elizabeth Hospital, Birmingham. For services to Transplantation Patients.
- Johann Cathy Muldoon. For services to Business and Architecture.
- Nicola Ann Murdoch, Chief Executive, Defence Medical Welfare Service. For services to Armed Forces Personnel and their Families.
- Daniel Murphy, National Crime Agency Liaison Officer, Lagos, Nigeria. For services to combating organised crime in Nigeria
- Colin George Mustoe, Chairman, Senator International. For services to Manufacturing and charity in North West England.
- Helen Elizabeth Myers, Assistant Headteacher, The Ashcombe School, Dorking and Chair, London Branch, Association for Language Learning. For services to Education.
- Pritpal Singh Nagi, DL. For services to Business and charity in Staffordshire.
- Stuart Martin Nagler, DL. For voluntary service in Hertfordshire.
- Philip Neame, Trustee and Deputy Chairman, The Ulysses Trust. For voluntary service to Reserve Forces and Cadets.
- Stephen Edward Newbound. For services to the Cabinet Office and No 10 Downing Street.
- Michael Nicholas. For services to the Fire and Rescue Service and BAME community in London.
- Peter Arthur Nicol. For services to the Highland Games, the Economy and voluntary service in the North of Scotland.
- Professor Jane Elizabeth Nixon, Deputy Director, Clinical Trials Research Unit, University of Leeds. For services to Health Research
- Brian David Noble. For services to Rugby League and charity.
- Joanne Noble, Prison Officer Specialist (Health Care), HM Prison Manchester. For services to Prisoners' Health.
- Pranee Nou. For services to Humanitarian Aid and International Development.
- Leonard John Nye, For services to Charitable Fundraising.
- Caroline Anne Oakley, Lately Director of Nursing (Quality and Patient Experience), Hywel Dda University Health Board. For services to the Nursing Profession and NHS Wales.
- Fergal Joseph O'Brien. For services to Social Work Practice.
- John O'Brien. For services to Youth Initiatives in the UK and Abroad.
- Erin O'Connor. For services to Fashion and charity.
- Dr. Simon O'Donovan, Clinical Lead, Young Onset Dementia Service, Cardiff and Vale University Health Board. For services to the Development of Mental Health Services for Older People.
- Eunice Olumide. For services to Broadcasting, the Arts and charity.
- Elizabeth Anne O'Reilly, Chair of Governors, Greenway Primary and Nursery School, Hertfordshire. For services to Education.
- Angela Gwen O'Sullivan, County Commissioner for Mid Glamorgan, St John Ambulance. For voluntary service to First Aid.
- Stephen Peter Oxlade, Executive Principal, Reigate and Coulsdon College. For services to Education.
- Nitin Palan. For services to Interfaith Relations.
- June Heather Parkinson. For political and public service.
- Anjna Morarji Patel, Principal Officer, Road Safety and Parking, Sandwell Council. For services to the Parking Profession.
- Sazeda Patel. For services to the community in Blackburn.
- Gerald John Peck. For services to Policing and local communities.
- James Ernest Perry. For services to the community in Ballymena, Northern Ireland.
- Susan Carolyn Phelps, Operations Director Wales, Alzheimer's Society. For services to People with Dementia in Wales.
- Jonathan Harry Phipps, Chairman, D-Day Revisited. For services to D-Day Veterans.
- Charles Pierce. Head of Geography & Social Science at Malapoa College and Head of Social Science at the Vanuatu Institute of Teacher Education, Vanuatu. For services to education in Vanuatu
- Amanda Jane Piper, Foster Carer, Suffolk County Council. For services to Children and Families.
- John Andrew Plant. For services to Business and the community in the North of England.
- John Raymond Cochrane Pollock. For charitable services to the community.
- Alison Porter, Higher Executive Officer, Department for Work and Pensions. For services to DWP and the community in Taunton.
- Richard Archer Porter. For services to the community in Glasgow.
- Pamela Mary Posnett, Leader, Melton Borough Council and Member, Leicestershire County Council. For services to Local Government.
- Lisa Joanne Pursehouse. For services to Sport, Charity Engagement and Community Development.
- Jean Hamilton Purves. For services to Girlguiding and the community in Moffat, Dumfriesshire.
- Sean Rafferty. For services to Broadcasting.
- Tahmina Rahman, Regional Director, ARTICLE 19 Bangladesh and South Asia. For services to freedom of expression and the right to information in Bangladesh
- Dr. Bharti Rajput, Director, Sole Body Soul. For services to Podiatry and the Economy in Dundee.
- Dr. Khalid Rashed, Consultant in Stroke Services, Yeovil Hospital. For services to Stroke Care in Somerset.
- Jonathan Rea. For services to Motorcycle Racing.
- Kathleen Rees, Retired, chief executive officer of the Haven Wolverhampton. For services to the protection of women and child victims of domestic violence in the West Midlands and overseas
- Alfred William Reoch, Former Chief Commissioner Gibraltar Scouts, Gibraltar. For services to Gibraltarian Scouting, the Anglican community and drama
- Dr. John Rooney Richards, Director, Kilbryde Hospice. For services to Palliative Care in South Lanarkshire.
- Amanda Jane Richardson, Chief Executive, The PACE Centre, Aylesbury and Founder-Chairman, Action Cerebral Palsy. For services to Special Educational Needs.
- Margot Roberts, Lately Administrative Director, Northern Ireland Medical and Dental Training Agency. For services to Medical and Dental Education.
- Penny Roberts, Founder and Chair of Governors, St Luke's CofE School, Hampstead, London. For services to Education.
- Mark Roscrow, Director (Procurement Services), NHS Wales. For services to Public Healthcare Procurement in Wales.
- Susan Helen Ross, Vice-President, British Exporters Association. For voluntary service to UK Exports.
- Jacqueline Rowbottom, Foster Carer, Cheshire West and Chester Council. For services to Children and Families.
- Dr. Kevin Rowland, Facilitator in Systems and Services, Sandwell Metropolitan Borough Council. For services to Special Educational Needs and Disabilities.
- Robin Bernard Rush. For services to charity.
- Jonathan Charles Rushton. For services to Mountain and Cave Rescue in North Yorkshire.
- Sylvia Russell, Chair, Lanark Community Development Trust. For services to the community and Heritage in Lanarkshire.
- John Robert Ryan. For services to Art.
- Stephen John Ryder. For services to the Highland Games, the Economy and voluntary service in Perthshire.
- Asif Sadiq. For services to Policing and the community in London.
- Wendy Jane Sadler. For services to Science, Engineering Communication and Engagement.
- Nicholas Mark Sales, Chief Engineer, Valent Applications Ltd. For services to Defence.
- Richard Salmon, Senior Executive Officer, Ministry of Defence. For services to Defence.
- Adele Emily Sande. For services to Music.
- Trevor Martin Sapey. For services to The Mary Rose Museum and Disabled and Disadvantaged People in Portsmouth and the South East.
- Ruth Joan Sara. For services to Young People in the South West of England.
- David Sherrard Sawyer. For services to charity and the community in Brighton.
- Timothy Sayer. For services to Art and Philanthropy.
- Dorina Isabella Scott, Headteacher, Beavers Community Primary School, Hounslow. For services to Education.
- Jacqueline Catherine Scott. For services to Children and the community in Sheffield, South Yorkshire.
- Dr. Cherith Semple, Macmillan Head and Neck Clinical Nurse Specialist, South Eastern Health and Social Care Trust. For services to Nursing.
- Ishbel Sewell. For services to the community in Aldbourne, Wiltshire.
- Tejinder Kumar Sharma. For services to Hindi Literature and to Community Cohesion in London.
- Denise Shaw, Lately Chair of Governors, Outwoods Primary School. For services to Special Educational Needs and Disabilities.
- Graham Neil Akeroyd Shaw, Chairman, British Chamber of Commerce Kenya. For services to the promotion of British business in Kenya
- Sandie Shaw, Singer. For services to Music.
- Edward Christopher Sheeran. For services to Music and charity.
- Emma Sheldon. For services to Exports.
- Deborah Shelley, Centre Manager, Bootle Church of England Team Ministry. For services to the Church and the community in South Sefton.
- Rev Canon Anthony Michael Shepherd. For services to the Church and the community in Harrogate, North Yorkshire.
- Grahame Shepherd, Chairman, Service Children in State Schools. For voluntary service to the Children of Military Personnel.
- Peggy Sherwood, Lately President, Jewish Gay and Lesbian Group. For services to the Jewish community.
- Michele Shirlow (Mrs Keightley), Chief Executive, Food Northern Ireland. For services to the Food and Drink Sector in Northern Ireland.
- Christopher Kevin Shurety. For services to Music.
- Keith David Simons. For services to Jewish Prisoners and the Jewish community in Pinner, Middlesex.
- Douglas Ian Mowat Simpson, Pharmaceutical Journalist, Kent. For services to Pharmaceutical Journalism.
- Elizabeth Rosemary Skelcher, Lately Assistant Director of Economic Development, City of London Corporation. For services to Business Relations and Development in London.
- Ruby Smith. For services to Charitable Fundraising and Young and Elderly Vulnerable People in Sheffield, South Yorkshire.
- Amanda Jane Southwick, Principal, Marchbank Free School, Darlington, County Durham. For services to Education.
- Brian Allen Spencer. For services to Mountain Rescue in Cumbria.
- Dr. Shobba Srivastava. For voluntary service to Community Cohesion in North East England.
- Nathan Nicholas Albert Fred Stagno, International Hockey Umpire, Gibraltar. For services to international hockey
- Dr. Alan Campbell Stanfield. For services to Curling.
- Lynn Caron Stanier, Founder, Their Future Today, Sri Lanka. For services to the community in Sri Lanka
- Alan Neil Russell Stannah, Joint Chairman, Stannah Lifts Holdings Ltd. For services to British Manufacturing.
- Brian Leslie Russell Stannah, Joint Chairman, Stannah Lifts Holdings Ltd. For services to British Manufacturing.
- Margaret Carol Stannard, Volunteer, Oak Field School and Specialist Sports College, Nottingham. For services to Special Educational Needs.
- Malcolm Stanton, Acting Head, Protective Equipment Group, London Fire Brigade. For services to the Safety of Firefighters and the Protection of the Public.
- Gwyn Starkey. For services to the Lesbian, Gay, Bisexual and Transgender Community in Greater Manchester.
- Richard David Stevens. For services to the community in Hastings, East Sussex.
- Barry Stickings, Lately Chair, Micro and Anophthalmic Children's Society. For services to Children with Visual Impairments.
- James Stretton, Lately Chairman, Lammermuir Festival. For services to the Arts, Finance and charity in Scotland.
- Alison Sykes. For services to Troubled Families in Dearne, South Yorkshire.
- Andrew Taunton, British Consular Agent, Pichincha Province, Ecuador. For services to British interests in Ecuador
- Graham Taylor. For services to Forestry.
- Jonathan Francis James Taylor, Lately Headmaster, Bootham School, York. For services to the York Independent State School Partnership.
- Professor Richard Hamilton Taylor, Visiting Professor in Civil Engineering, University of Bristol. For services to Engineering.
- Patricia Lorraine Thomas, HR and Redeployment Adviser, Transport for London. For services to Transport in London and the community.
- Captain Winston Thomas, Owner, Pembrey Airport. For services to Aviation in Wales.
- Dr. Elizabeth Claire Thompson, Lately Senior Policy Adviser, Wellcome Trust. For services to Science.
- Bernard Oliver Tickner. For services to Horticulture and to Wildlife Conservation in Suffolk.
- Hugh Robert James Totten. For services to the community in Northern Ireland.
- Dr. Colin Alfred Tourle, Medical Services worldwide. For voluntary medical work overseas
- David Brian Treadwell. For voluntary service to the community in Acocks Green, Birmingham.
- Richard Treble, Chief Scientific Adviser, LGC. For services to the Advancement of Drug Forensics.
- Duncan Tree, Head of Policy and Performance, Volunteering Matters. For services to Health and Social Care.
- Richard Michael Twemlow. For services to Scouting in Wirral.
- Yvette Nyantah Twumasi-Ankrah, Director, Ankrah Associates. For services to Women in Business.
- Vernon Chandrasiri Udugampola. For services to Humanitarian Aid, particularly in Sri Lanka and the UK.
- Tariq Zamir Usmani, Founding Chair, Better Community Business Network. For services to Community Cohesion.
- Robert David Uttley. For services to the community in Calder Valley and Todmorden, West Yorkshire.
- The Reverend June Vaughan. For services to the community in Aberfan, Young People and the Red Cross.
- Norman Veitch. For services to Glassblowing.
- Deepak Verma. For services to the Arts.
- Philippa Vernon-Powell, Field Director, New Life Mexico. For services to disadvantaged children in Puerto Vallarta, Mexico
- Jean Margery Vidler, Secretary, Kingston Environment Centre and director, Green Futures Festivals. For services to the community in Kingston upon Thames.
- Willem Patrick Visscher. For services to the Craft of Parchment and Vellum Making.
- Councillor Alberta Margaret Mallard Waddington. For services to the community in the West Midlands.
- Brian Wilfred Walker, Headteacher, West Park School, Derby. For services to Education.
- Carol Walker, Director, Somme Association. For services to Commemoration and Reconciliation.
- Catherine Walker, War Poets Collection Curator, Edinburgh Napier University. For services to Education, Heritage and Public Engagement.
- Dawn Walker, Senior Executive Officer, Ministry of Defence. For services to Defence.
- Helen Mary Walker. For services to Heritage and the community in Ealing.
- Louise Ann Walkiden, Foster Carer, Hertfordshire County Council. For services to Children and Families.
- Timothy John Walkiden, Foster Carer, Hertfordshire County Council. For services to Children and Families.
- Alan Robert Waltham, Leader, North Lincolnshire Council. For services to Local Government.
- Colonel Michael Robert Lorne Ward, Honorary Treasurer, Combat Stress. For voluntary service to Veterans.
- Simon Christian Iliffe Watkin, Office for Security and Counter-Terrorism, Home Office. For services to Border Security.
- Janet Watson, Deputy Headteacher, Queen Elizabeth's School, Wimborne, Dorset. For services to Education.
- Andrews Dennis Webb, School Secretary, London School of Economics. For services to Higher Education and to the community in East Anglia.
- Gail Eileen Webb, Education Consultant and lately Head of Learning Improvement, Leeds Local Education Authority. For services to Education.
- Andrew Walter Bougourd Ross Weir, Chair of British Chamber of Commerce, Hong Kong. For services to British commercial interests overseas
- Janet Elizabeth Wheatley, DL. For services to Voluntary Action Rotherham and the community in Rotherham, South Yorkshire.
- Fiona Deborah Joyce Whimster, Headteacher, The Lincoln St Giles Nursery School. For services to Education and Community Cohesion in Lincolnshire.
- Richard Henry Whitehouse. For services to Cave and Mountain Rescue Organisations.
- Kathleen Mary Whitmore-Payne, Foster Carer, Cornwall Council. For services to Children and Families.
- Una Maria Wiatrek, Senior Executive Officer, Scotland Lead, Devolution Strategy, Advice and Legislation Team, DWP. For services to DWP.
- Kate Wickham, Managing Director, GATE7 Ltd. For services to Exports and Outward Investments.
- Etheleen Mildred Wigley, Founder, Children First Derby Charity. For services to Vulnerable Children in Derby.
- Dr. John Alasdair Wilson, Consultant Gastroenterologist, Fife Health Board. For services to Healthcare.
- Jennifer Woods, Associate Director (Widening Participation), Kingston University. For services to Widening Access to Higher Education.
- Iona Margaret Worthington. For voluntary political service.
- Oladele Woye, Executive Officer, Department for Work and Pensions. For services to DWP and the community in East London.
- Mary Hunter Yapp. For services to Art through the Albany Art Gallery, Cardiff and charitable services in Wales.
- Wai Kee Yau, Secretary, Royal British Legion & Hong Kong Ex-Servicemen's Association. For services to ex-servicemen in Hong Kong
- John Melville Young, Lately President, Homeless World Cup. For services to Sport and Social Entrepreneurship.
- Robert James Barton Young, Chair, Board of Governors, Foyle College and Governor, Ebrington Primary School. For services to Education in Northern Ireland.

=== British Empire Medal (BEM) ===
- Ajaz Ahmed – Mentor, Mosaic Network and Council Member / Advisory board member, Huddersfield University. For services to Young People.
- Patricia Obiageli Aiyenuro – For services to Sport in the London Borough of Camden.
- Anthony Francis Edwin Lister Aldridge – For services to the community in Ealing, London.
- Julie Ann Alford – For services to Young People in Holt, Norfolk.
- Noor Jahan Ali – Senior Buying Manager – World Foods, WM Morrison Supermarkets Plc. For services to Diversity in the Retail Industry.
- Ronald William Allison – For services to Athletics.
- James Campbell Anderson – Honorary President, 1st Stonehouse Company. For services to the Boys' Brigade and the community in Stonehouse, Lanarkshire.
- Marjorie Atkinson – For services to the community in Great Hale, Lincolnshire.
- Henry Stephen Austin – For services to the Boys' Brigade in Tonbridge and North West Kent.
- Catherine Rachel Bache – Founder, Secret Garden Outdoor Nursery. For services to Early Years Play and Education in Fife.
- Olayinka Idris Bada – Designated Detention Officer, Metropolitan Police. For services to Policing.
- Reginald John Bailes – For services to Sport and the community in Old Trafford, Manchester.
- Felicity Alice Bailey – Teaching Assistant, Sir Harry Smith Community College, Peterborough. For services to Education.
- Bryan Logan Bain – Volunteer, Nairn Citizens' Advice Bureau. For services to the community in Nairn.
- Dr. Michael Bandar – Entrepreneur. For services to Young Entrepreneurs in the West Midlands.
- Christopher Luke Bannister – For services to the community in Newton and Clifton, Lancashire.
- Beryl May Barcroft – For services to Young People and the community in Forsbrook, Staffordshire.
- Fergus Allan Barklie – For services to Tennis.
- Richard Frank Barugh – For services to the community in Easingwold, North Yorkshire.
- Leonard Arthur Bates – For services to the community in Acton Trussell, Bednall and Teddesley Hay, Staffordshire.
- Valerie Jean Bell – For services to the community in Huddersfield and Kirklees, West Yorkshire.
- Joan Bellis – For services to charity and to the community.
- Pamela Irene Berry – For services to the community in Delph, Greater Manchester.
- Peter Thomas Frank Bickmore, BEM – Organiser, British Veterans of Vis, Croatia. For services to the commemoration of the Adriatic Campaign in World War Two
- Valerie Black – For services to the community in Cookstown, County Tyrone.
- Graham Charles Bland – For services to The Fire Fighters' Charity and the community in Nottinghamshire.
- Carol Margaret Bratty – President, Hardwicke and District Branch, Royal British Legion. For voluntary service to ex-Service Personnel.
- Paul James Breen – For charitable services to the Aberdeen Royal Infirmary Therapeutic Roof Garden.
- Pamela Joan Britton – Caretaker, Stifford Clays Medical Practice, Essex. For services to Healthcare.
- Glenda Margaret Brocklehurst – Manager, Early Years Projects, Stockport Metropolitan Council. For services to Children and Families.
- Susan Brook – For services to the community in Llanfrynach and Cantref.
- Florence Elizabeth Broughton – For services to Disabled People in Abingdon, Oxfordshire.
- Teresa Ann Brown – Personal Assistant to Head of Department of International Trade, British Embassy, Bucharest, Romania. For services to the British community in Romania
- Grace Brown – For voluntary service to the community in Langholm, Ewes and Westerkirk.
- Ian Elliott Brown – For services to Badminton.
- Margaret Elizabeth Mary Brown – For services to Music in Northern Ireland.
- Mary Young Brownlie – For services to the community in Broughton and Upper Tweeddale.
- Dr. Melanie Bruce – Clinical Psychologist, Starfish Plus. For services to Children and Families in Norfolk.
- Brenda Margaret Bryden – For voluntary service to Wrexham Maelor Hospital and the community in Wrexham.
- Eileen Fiona Buchan – Management Team Chair, Peterhead Unit, Sea Cadet Corps. For voluntary service to Young People.
- Joan Bunn – For services to Citizens' Advice Bureau and the community in Nuneaton, Warwickshire.
- Denise Burgin – Sessional Supervisor, ParentLine Scotland. For services to the Welfare of Children and their Families.
- Roger John Burnett – For services to the community in Scarborough.
- Clifford Keith Burns – For services to the community in Newtownards, County Down.
- Graham Edward Bushill – For services to Young People in Crewe.
- James Anthony Fowell Buxton – For services to the community in Yeovil, Somerset.
- Elizabeth Marilyn Campbell – For services to the Girlguiding in Northern Ireland.
- Henrietta Millicent Campbell – Vice-President, Royal British Nursing Association. For services to Disabled Registered Nurses.
- Evelyn Rebecca Canavan – For services to Mental Health.
- Alistair Cassie – For services to the community in Ballater, Aberdeenshire.
- Allan Caswell – For services to the community in Bayston Hill, Shropshire.
- Bula Chakravarty-Agbo – For services to the Arts within the community in South London.
- Chrystine Sarah Claire Chalk – For voluntary service to Save the Children.
- William Chambers – For services to Football and the community.
- Carol Margaret Chapman – Member, St John Fellowship Cheshire. For voluntary service to St John Ambulance.
- Helen Chapman – Grade 7, Ministry of Defence. For services to Defence.
- Alan Alexander Clarke – For services to the community in Northern Ireland through Dance Education.
- Jean Clarke – For services to Riding for the Disabled Association, Northern Ireland.
- Morag Allan Coates – For services to Young People in Darlington.
- Connal Murray Cochrane – Director, The Cochrane Foundation. For services to the community in Alva, Clackmannanshire.
- John James Cochrane – For services to Sport and the community in Northern Ireland.
- Lillian Cook – Co-Owner, Perth and Dundee Tuition Centres. For services to Education.
- Richard Neville Kenneth Copas – For services to Young People in Holt, Norfolk.
- Jean Roberta Corliss – Treasurer and Operations Manager, Soar Valley Bus. For services to Rural Community Transport.
- Avril Cotterill – For services to the community in Haughton, Staffordshire.
- Lee Grant Cracknell – For services to Disability Sport in Essex.
- Andrew Frederick Craig – For services to the Armed Services and the community in Fleetwood, Lancashire.
- Rosalind Cramp – For services to Disability Sport in Hertfordshire.
- Mandy Cunningham – For services to Bowling.
- Joseph Henry Curry – For services to Charitable Fundraising in County Tyrone.
- Natasha Dalton – Tutor, City College Peterborough. For services to Further Education.
- Ellen Marie Delaney – For services to the community in Fordbridge, Solihull.
- Mary Diamond – For services to Cancer Support.
- Marianne Rose Diller – For services to the community in Halesowen, West Midlands.
- Ruby Eva Ditcher – For services to the community in Tavistock, Devon and Callington, Cornwall.
- Mervyn John Dougan – For services to Older People in Northern Ireland.
- Margaret McCall Driscoll – For services to the community in Burnmouth, Berwickshire.
- Pamela Joyce Drummond – For voluntary service.
- William Thomas Duperouzel – For services to charity and the community in Bedfordshire.
- Rachel Ehrentreu – For services to the Vulnerable and Elderly members of the Jewish community in North West London.
- Barbara Ann Elliott – For services to Young People, charity and the community in Llangattock and Crickhowell.
- Annie English – Volunteer fund raiser for Elche Children's Care Home, Spain. For services to child welfare
- Christopher Elwell – For services to Theatre.
- Brian Wynn Evans – For voluntary service in the Scottish Borders.
- Andree Falla – For services to the Girl Guides and other charities.
- Dean Faulkner – Bandmaster, Isle of Sheppey St John Ambulance Band. For voluntary service to St John Ambulance.
- Uma Nalayini Fernandes – For voluntary service to Community Healthcare in Middlesex.
- Timothy Fogden – For services to charity and the community in Bury St Edmunds, Suffolk.
- Barbara Evelyn Forrai – For services to charity in the UK and Russia.
- Zoe Frais – For services to Young People and the community in Alnwick, Northumberland.
- Mary Alison Freemantle – For services to the community in Bishop's Waltham, Hampshire.
- Beatrice Evelyn Frost – For services to UK National Heritage.
- Lilian Elsie Fuller – For services to Elderly People in Ash, Surrey.
- Barry Anthony Furness – Chairman, Fareham Branch, RAF Association. For voluntary service to ex-Service Personnel.
- Margaret Elizabeth Galbraith – For services to Foster Care in Northern Ireland.
- Shirley Galsworthy – For services to Elderly People and the community in St Albans, Hertfordshire.
- Priscilla Lyons Gamble – For voluntary service to the community in County Fermanagh, Northern Ireland.
- Eileen Anne Gardner – Art Tutor. For services to Adult Education and the Arts in Fife.
- Richard Adrian Giles – For services to the community in Pewsey, Wiltshire.
- Phillip Robert Gillespie – For charitable services in Northern Ireland.
- Alastair Gilmore – For services to Higher Education and to the community in Antrim, Northern Ireland.
- Robert Edward Glasgow – Secretary, Cockenzie and Port Seton Amateur Radio Club. For services to Amateur Radio, the community and charity in South East Scotland.
- Sheena Mhairi Glover – For services to Music and charity in Angus.
- Doreen Golding – For services to charity and the Pearly Kings and Queens Society.
- Richard Jeremy Golland – For services to Business and charity.
- Hilary Nan Goodall – For services to the community in Blackburn with Darwen, Lancashire.
- David Gordon – Ranger, Peak District National Park. For services to Wildlife, particularly the Protection of the Ring Ouzel.
- Samuel Johnston Gray – Organist and Choirmaster, Ballyholme Presbyterian Church, Bangor, Northern Ireland. For charitable services.
- Joan Thelma Green – Chair, Homestart Craigavon. For services to Children and Families in Northern Ireland.
- Dr. Linda Helene Greenwall – Dentist, Hampstead Healthcare Ltd. For services to the Dental Profession in the UK and Abroad.
- Steven Barry Greenwood – Special Chief Inspector, British Transport Police. For voluntary service to Policing.
- Raymond Griffiths – Secretary, Birmingham Branch, SSAFA. For voluntary service to ex-Service Personnel.
- Urszula Krystina Gudiens – For services to Charitable Fundraising.
- Emma Kirstie Guilbaud – Volunteer. For services to the centenary commemorations of the Battle of Néry
- Mary Ishbel Haggarty – Secretary, Arrochar and Tarbert Community Council. For services to the community in Arrochar, Tarbet and Ardlui, Argyll.
- Patricia Hall – For services to the community.
- Eileen Alicia Hamilton – For services to the community in Northern Ireland.
- Martyn Charles Hamlin – Disability Employment Adviser, Devon Cornwall and Somerset, Department for Work and Pensions. For services to the community in Norton Sub Hamdon, Somerset.
- Frank Leslie Hancock – For services to Golf and the community.
- Louisa Esther Harbottle – Prison Visitor HM Prison Frankland. For services to Prisoners.
- Franklyn Harris – Learning Ambassador, Learning and Work Institute. For services to Adult Learning and Skills.
- Josephine Harris – For services to charity and the community in Lincoln.
- Marian Jean Harris – Musical Director, Milford Haven Amateur Operatic Society. For services to Music and Amateur Community Theatre in Pembrokeshire.
- Noel Harris – For services to charity and the community in Lincoln.
- Kenneth Harvey – Head of Service, Children with Disabilities, Central Bedfordshire Council. For services to Children and Young People.
- Anthony John Hawkins – For voluntary service to Disabled People in Ceredigion.
- Marie Hawthorne – Escort for Lord-Lieutenant Cadets, Northern Ireland Reserve Forces and Cadets Association. For voluntary service to the Army Cadet Force.
- Rachel Hayes – Head of Membership and Events, Regen SW. For services to Women in the Energy Sector.
- Erika Roswitha Hayward – Founder, Timbertown, Maidenhead. For services to Education.
- Dr. Samantha Georgina Healy – Campaign Director, the 5% Club, QinetiQ. For services to Apprenticeships and Graduate Programmes in the Defence Industry.
- Elizabeth McRae Hendry – For services to Clydebank Golden Jubilee Hospital.
- Melanie Hipwood – Security Operations Manager, Department for International Development. For services to Public Administration.
- David Hugh Hodge – For services to the community in Cockfield, Suffolk.
- David Allen Hogarth – For services to Elderly People in Westminster, London.
- Mary Holman – For services to the community in Ditchling, East Sussex.
- Deborah Ann Holme – For services to Dance and Young People in Essex.
- Christopher John Houlgate – Volunteer. For services to Southrepps Commons.
- Elizabeth Hueston – Writer. For services to the community in Portglenone, County Antrim.
- Mary Hugo – For services to the community in Manaton, Devon.
- Neil Andrew Christopher Hulme – Conservation Adviser, Sussex Branch, Butterfly Conservation. For services to Wildlife Conservation.
- Muriel Anna Hunt – For charitable services in Oxford.
- Hugh Arthur Hutchinson – Captain, 1st Vale of Leven Boys' Brigade. For services to the Boys' Brigade and the community in Vale of Leven.
- Felicity Jane Irons – For services to Rush and Heritage Crafts.
- Ashley Norman Jackson – Landscape Watercolourist. For services to Art.
- Valerie James – For services to Older People and to the community.
- Edward Jenkins – For services to the community in Dinas Powys.
- Jennifer Carol Johns – For voluntary service in Portsmouth, Hampshire.
- Colin Johnson – Operations Assistant, the Conservative Party. For political service.
- Gloria Elizabeth Johnson – For services to the community in Measham, Leicestershire.
- Ian Johnson – For services to the community in Skelton, North Yorkshire.
- Frank Jonas – For services to the community in Portsmouth.
- Captain David Cledlyn Jones – For services to Anglo-German relations and World War II Education.
- Ronald William Godfrey Jones – Chairman, Bassaleg and Rhiwderin Branch, Royal British Legion. For voluntary service to ex-Service Personnel and their Families.
- Mary Kasey – For voluntary service to Save the Children.
- Janet Margaret Kempson – Manager, Centre Place Family Centre, Southend on Sea, Essex. For services to Children and Families.
- Janet Dawn Kerridge – For services to the community in Walsham le Willows, Suffolk.
- Jane Kett – For services to the Girl Guides in Grimsby.
- Lorna Elizabeth Key – For services to the community in Little Totham, Essex.
- Suraj Bhan Khandelwal – Chairman and managing director, S&A Drapers Ltd and SDL Secure Deposit Ltd. For services to Business and the community in Leicester.
- Ann Georgina Khoshbin – For services to Education.
- John Edward Kiddell – Volunteer. For services to the British community in Madrid and local charities
- Ibolya Violet Knill – For services to Holocaust Education and Interfaith Cohesion.
- Vinod Mathuradas Kotecha – For services to the Asian community in North London.
- Gavin Richard Lambert – Head of Information Department, National Crime Agency and Chairman of Trustees, Different Strokes. For services to Law Enforcement and Young People.
- Alan James Wilson Langton – For services to the community in Mapperley and Arnold, Nottinghamshire.
- Ronald Peter Lavers – For services to the community in the Rame Peninsula, Cornwall.
- Jean Lazzara – Chair of Lady Harriet Bentinck Trust, Naples, Italy. For services to the British community in Naples
- Celia Jane Leatt – For services to the community in Bristol.
- Dr. Rudolf Oscar Leavor – For services to the Jewish community and Interfaith Relations in Bradford, West Yorkshire.
- Norman Lee – For services to Football and Young People in Tameside.
- The Rev. Jane Mary Legh – For voluntary service in Derbyshire.
- James George Francis William Leslie – For voluntary service to Police Welfare in Northern Ireland.
- Gaynor Ann Lewis – For services to charity and the community in Rowsley, Derbyshire.
- Linda Lewis – Volunteer, West Durrington Phoenix Youth Group. For services to Young People.
- Noreen Mary Lewis – Lead Nurse, Cardiff and Vale University Hospital Board. For services to Haematology Nursing in South Wales.
- Edwin Horace Lintott – For services to the community in Stedham, West Sussex.
- Harvey Arthur Lawrence Lloyd – For services to the community, Mountain Rescue, Mountaineering and Heritage in Wales.
- Harry Lodge – President and chairman, Wakefield Angling Club and Executive committee member, Newmillerdam Country Park. For services to Angling.
- Jacqueline Longden – Lately Manager, The BLESMA Elizabeth Frankland Moore Home, Blackpool. For services to Veterans.
- John William Lord – For services to Flintknapping.
- Geoffrey Philip Lynch – For services to Disabled People and the community in Waterlooville and Havant, Hampshire.
- Ian Bradley Macdonald – For services to Citizens' Advice Bureau and the community in Lisburn.
- Joe Mahon – For services to charity and Cross Community Relations in Fermanagh.
- Janice Main – Volunteer and lately Governor, Stag Lane Junior School, Edgware. For services to Education.
- Mohammed Tauqeer Malik – Councillor, Aberdeen City Council. For services to the community in Aberdeen.
- Edward Marcus – Chairman, Maysfield Support Group. For services to the Cancer Fund for Children.
- Dorothy Mary Markham – Director, Cairn Mhor Childcare Partnership. For services to Children, Young People and their Families in Fife.
- John Bernard George Marsden – For services to the community in Tickhill, South Yorkshire.
- Anne Isabel Masino – For voluntary service to Young People through the UK Scout Association.
- Margaret Anne Mason – For services to the Friends of Thetford Forest and heritage in Suffolk.
- Margaret Mather – Secretary, Inveraray Highland Games. For services to the community in Inveraray.
- Samuel James Mawhinney – Director, Denholm Fish Selling Company Ltd. For services to the Fishing Industry and community in County Down.
- Elizabeth McCann – For services to Criminal Justice.
- Mary McCarthy – For voluntary service.
- Ian McDonnell – For services to the community in the Ards Peninsula, Northern Ireland.
- Mary McGowan – First Aid Volunteer, British Red Cross. For voluntary service to First Aid in Aberdeen.
- Elaine McHaffie – Volunteer, North East Sensory Service, Aberdeen Branch. For services to People with Disabilities and Charity.
- Frank McHugh – Group Scout Leader, 33rd Ayrshire Scout Group. For services to the Scouting Movement and the community in East Ayrshire.
- June McIntosh – Deputy Charge Nurse, Edinburgh Cancer Centre. For services to Young People with Cancer and to Charity in Edinburgh.
- Iris Ann Hume King McNab – Secretary, Friends of Victoria and Whyteman's Brae Hospitals. For services to charity in Kirkcaldy, Fife.
- Jacqueline Fraser McNairn – For services to Young People and the community in Pathhead, Midlothian.
- James Duncan McKay McNeill – For services to the community in Broughshane and the Glens, Northern Ireland.
- Brian Medhurst – For services to the community in Yelverton, Devon.
- David Meldrum – For services to Rothesay Brandanes Amateur Football Club, Argyll and Bute.
- Iffet Anwar Mian – Founding Member, All Pakistan Women's Association Birmingham Branch. For services to the community
- Andrew Johnston Michie – For services to the Safety of Outdoor Adventure Activities.
- Sabina Miller – For services to Holocaust Education and Interfaith Cohesion.
- Roger Graham Millns – For services to the community in Audlem, Cheshire.
- Arthur Alexander Mitchell – For voluntary service to the Ex-Service community in Lisburn.
- David Henry Montgomery – Member, Ballymena Combat Cancer Group. For services to Cancer Sufferers in Northern Ireland.
- Dr. Roger Philip Morgan – For voluntary service to the Arts in Herefordshire.
- Sally Elizabeth Morris – For services to the community in Islip, Northamptonshire.
- Barbara Liddle Mortimer – Lately Secretary, Gateshead Division, SSAFA. For voluntary service to ex-Service Personnel.
- William John Mulroe – For services to charity and the community in Featherstone, West Yorkshire.
- Dr. Sohail Munshi – General Practitioner, Five Oaks Family Practice, North Manchester. For services to Primary Care.
- Brian Edward Murphy – Special Constable, Cumbria Constabulary. For services to Policing.
- Anthony Cecil Nelson – For services to the community in Sheringham, Norfolk.
- Stephen Newman – Shepperton Lock and Weir Keeper, Environment Agency. For services to Inland Waterways.
- Andrew Norton – For services to the community in Hinton St George, Somerset.
- Dennis Cyril Norton – Founder, Norton Collection. For services to Community Heritage in Bromsgrove, Worcestershire.
- Cara O'Donnell – Co-Founder, SAMS. For services to charity in Glasgow.
- Cornelius Peter O'Hare – Caretaker, Southern Regional College, Newry West Campus. For services to Further Education in Northern Ireland.
- Eileen O'Sullivan – Volunteer, Age Exchange, Blackheath. For services to Education.
- Dr. Ruth Padday – General Practitioner, Hedge End Medical Centre. For services to Healthcare and Young People in Hampshire.
- Catherine Helena Mary Palmer – For charitable services to The Fire Fighters' Charity in the North West.
- Roy William Palmer – For services to charity and the community.
- Janet Parry – For services to the community and Local Government.
- Margaret Ann Parry – For services to the community in Chobham, Surrey.
- John Henry Paterson – For services to Charitable Fundraising and the community in Hull, East Riding of Yorkshire.
- Michael John Pattie – For services to charity in Dumfries and Galloway.
- Mary Ellen Phillips – Director, Motherwell and Wishaw Citizens' Advice Bureau. For services to the community in Lanarkshire.
- Margaret Pick – For voluntary service to Save the Children.
- Judith Elizabeth Powell – For services to Operation Christmas Child, Meltham, West Yorkshire.
- Clifford John Powis – Paramedic, Welsh Ambulance Service NHS Trust. For services to Emergency Care.
- Raymond John Radmall – For services to the community in Pagham, West Sussex.
- Marie Rafferty – For services to the community in Newry and Mourne.
- Alice Victoria Rankin – Owner, Baker's Oven Café. For services to the community in Newarthill, North Lanarkshire.
- George Alan Ranyard – For services to charity.
- Glenys Diane Raybould – Founder, Rhondda Breast Friends. For voluntary service to People with Breast Cancer.
- Margaret Rees-Hughes – Community Non-Officer (Independent Member), Hywel Dda University Hospital Board. For services to the NHS in Wales.
- Andrew Howard Riley – For services to the community in Northwood Hills, Middlesex.
- Agnes Margaret Ringland – Lately Post Mistress, Crossgar Post Office. For services to the community in Crossgar, County Down.
- Gordon Roach – For services to the community in Winstone, Gloucestershire.
- Jeremy Roberts – Lately Deputy Headteacher, Rhyl High School. For services to Education and the community in Rhyl.
- Philip James Rusk – For services to charitable and voluntary work in the local community.
- Fiona Florence Russell – Shop Volunteer, Capability Scotland. For services to charity in Edinburgh.
- Alexander Douglas Ruthven – Trustee, Therapet. For voluntary service to the community in Edinburgh and the Lothians.
- June Beryl Sadler – For services to the community in Sutton Coldfield, West Midlands.
- Mohinder Singh Sangha – Member, Board of Jathadars, Sikh Council. For services to the community in Leicester.
- Daniel Joseph Savage – Chairman, Brookvale Care Home for the Disabled. For services to Disabled People.
- David John Sayers – For services to the community in Henfield, West Sussex.
- Amanda Jane Scales – Learning Ambassador, Learning and Work Institute. For services to Adult Learning and Skills.
- Wilston Scotland – Coach, Montserrat. For services to youth and sports development in Montserrat
- Robert Philip Scott – For services to Young People through the Scout Association.
- Elaine Scriven – For services to the community in Bradford, West Yorkshire.
- Prudence Bridget Scurfield – For services to Fundraising for Save the Children.
- Graham Scutt – For services to Rugby.
- Allan Henry Searle – For services to the community in Stogursey, Somerset.
- Maureen Pearl Selley – For services to Local History.
- Trudi Shaw – Executive Officer, Ministry of Defence. For voluntary service.
- Sandra Irene Showell – Teacher, Peter Symonds College, Winchester. For services to Education.
- Kandiah Sivayogaiswaran – For services to the Midlands Tamil Cultural Association and to Young People in Birmingham.
- Alan David Skews – For services to the community in Callington, Cornwall.
- Gillian Kathleen Smith – Founder and Manager, Gooseberry Bush Day Nursery, Camborne, Cornwall. For services to Children and Families.
- Teresa Maria Smith – Chair and Trustee, Sheffield Unit. For voluntary service to the Sea Cadet Corps.
- Ann Miriam Squirrell – Founder, Mid-Suffolk Axis. For services to People with Physical and Sensory Disabilities in Mid-Suffolk.
- Gary George Stack – Constable, West Midlands Police. For services to Policing and the community.
- Roy Stephen – For services to the Malayalee Association, UK Knanaya Catholic Association and to the community in Swindon, Wiltshire.
- Ann Stewart – For voluntary service to the Arts, Healthcare and Steam Railway Preservation in London, Edinburgh and Derby.
- Margaret Stewart – Guide Leader and Volunteer. For services to the community in Aughnacloy, County Tyrone.
- Priscilla Carol Stirling – For services to Youth Sport in Carrickfergus.
- Mark Richard Stockdale – Volunteer, Hull Children's University. For services to Education.
- Helen Stoodley – Lately Sergeant, Metropolitan Police. For services to Policing and Youth Engagement in South West London.
- Duncan Struthers – For services to the community in Hillingdon, London.
- Alan Frederick Sturgeon – For services to Rugby.
- Christine Helen Sutherland – For services to the community in Banff and Buchan.
- Pauline Anne Sykes – For services to the community in Rawcliffe, East Riding of Yorkshire.
- Christopher Syrus – Founder, SYRUS Consultancy C.I.C. For services to Further Education.
- Sylvia Georgina Tatnell – Local Councillor, Alicante, Spain. For services to the community in Alicante
- Dennis Taylor – Higher Executive Officer, Programme Management Officer, Data Science, Department for Work and Pensions. For services to the DWP Digital Group and Charitable Fundraising.
- Marie Taylor – Area Standard Bearer, Royal Naval Association. For services to Veterans and the community in York.
- Mary Olivia Tebble – For voluntary service to Wildlife Conservation and the community in East Lothian.
- Hilary Gwyneth Terry – Youth Leader, Olney Holiday Bible Club. For services to the community in Olney, Buckinghamshire.
- David Paul Thomas – For services to charity in Africa and Pastoral Care in the Fire Service in Wales.
- Margaret Yvonne Thompson – For services to the community in Shareshill, Staffordshire.
- Samuel James Thompson – For voluntary service to the community and ex-Service Personnel in Portadown.
- Linda Ann Thornton – For services to Young People in Dorset through the Creation of the John Thornton Young Achievers Foundation.
- Richard Derek Tilney – For services to the community in Malmesbury, Wiltshire.
- John Tivnan – Councillor, Torpoint Town Council. For services to Local Government and the community.
- David Noel Tod – Vice-Chairman, Scottish Fisheries Museum. For services to Preserving the Heritage of the Scottish Fishing Industry.
- Ruth Tomkins – Fundraiser, Dementia UK. For charitable services to People with Dementia and their Carers.
- Nigel James Travis – For services to Boxing and the community.
- Ruth Marie Truelove – Reading Assistant and Governor, Stepney Primary School, Hull and Volunteer, National Literacy Trust. For services to Education.
- Hugh Tulip – For services to Cricket and the community.
- Michael Tuohy – Volunteer, Crisis at Christmas. For services to Homeless People in London.
- Neville Brian Turner – For voluntary service to Young People in Leicester.
- Bessie Underwood – For services to Elderly People in Castleton, North Yorkshire.
- Gillian Christine Vine – Chair, Buckinghamshire Association for the Care of Offenders. For voluntary service in Buckinghamshire.
- Effie Walker – School Crossing Patrol Warden, Colgrain Primary School. For services to Education and the community in Helensburgh, Argyll and Bute.
- Nicola Wallis – For services to Youth Music.
- Maureen Violet Wallwork – For services to the community in Washington, Tyne and Wear.
- Caroline Mary Ward – For services to the community in Winchester, Hampshire.
- Catherine Brigid Waters – Lately Matron, Central Criminal Court. For services to the Welfare of Court Users.
- Jean Mary Watkins – For services to Elderly People in Frimley and Camberley, Surrey and Farnborough, Hampshire.
- Sister Annie Grace Watt – For services to Peace and Reconciliation in Larne.
- Carol June Wheeler – For voluntary service to County Hospital, Pontypool.
- Peter Wilkinson – For services to Music.
- Graham Wilson – For services to Forestry.
- Susan Margaret Wilson, JP – For services to the community in Chellaston, Derbyshire.
- Martin Charles Windle – For services to Football and the community.
- Eileen Mary Wright – Volunteer, Bournemouth Hospital Charity, Royal Bournemouth and Christchurch Hospitals NHS Foundation Trust. For services to Healthcare and charity.
- Vyona Jean Young – Inclusion Manager, Special Education Needs, St Helena. For services to the community, particularly special needs education in St Helena.

=== Queen's Police Medal (QPM) ===
==== England and Wales ====
- Michelle Sarah Dunn – Deputy Chief Constable, Hertfordshire Constabulary
- Alison Newcomb – Deputy Assistant Commissioner, Metropolitan Police Service
- Hilary Jane Sawyers – Chief Constable, Staffordshire Police
- Karen Judith Manners – Deputy Chief Constable, Warwickshire Police
- Alun Maxwell Thomas – Chief Superintendent, British Transport Police
- Sue Williams – Detective Chief Superintendent, Metropolitan Police Service
- John O'Hare – Chief Superintendent, Greater Manchester Police
- Paul Nicholls – Constable, Essex Police
- Roger Roger – Constable, Derbyshire Constabulary
- Debra Cooper – Constable, Metropolitan Police Service
- Karen Warner – Detective Inspector, North Yorkshire Police
- Amerjit Singh – Detective Sergeant, Cambridgeshire Constabulary
- Ian Fred Birkin – Temporary Sergeant, Nottinghamshire Police
- Kathryn Somerville— Temporary Detective Sergeant, Warwickshire Police
- Tracy O'Hara – Detective Constable, Merseyside Police
- David Whalley – Neighbourhood Sergeant, Merseyside Police
- Nigel Paul Hatten – Detective Sergeant, Gloucestershire Constabulary

==== Scotland ====
- Gillian Imery – Chief Superintendent, Police Service of Scotland
- Johnny Gwynne – Deputy Chief Constable, Police Service of Scotland

==== Northern Ireland ====
- Nigel Forsythe – Detective Chief Superintendent, Police Service of Northern Ireland
- William Thomas Colin Monteith – Detective Sergeant, Police Service of Northern Ireland
- Douglas Gareth Wilson – Sergeant, Police Service of Northern Ireland

=== Queen's Fire Service Medal (QFSM) ===
==== England and Wales ====
- Caroline Louise Anderson – Temp. Watch Manager, Devon & Somerset Fire & Rescue Service
- David Edward Curry – chief fire officer, Hampshire Fire & Rescue Service
- Adam John Eckley – Acting chief fire officer, Essex Fire & Rescue Service
- Brian Hawes – Watch Commander, Suffolk Fire & Rescue Service

==== Scotland ====
- Andrew Watt – Group Manager, Scottish Fire and Rescue Service
- Linda Coughlan – Watch Manager, Scottish Fire and Rescue Service
- Kenneth Simmons – Watch Manager, Scottish Fire and Rescue Service

=== Queen's Ambulance Service Medal (QAM) ===
==== England and Wales ====
- Neil Philip Le Chevalier – Director of Operations, South Western Ambulance Service NHS Foundation Trust
- Paul Liversidge – Director, North East Ambulance Service NHS Foundation Trust
- Robin Petterson – Clinical Support Officer, Welsh Ambulance Services NHS Trust
- Tony Rossetti – First Responder Officer, Welsh Ambulance Services NHS Trust

==== Scotland ====
- Lewis Campbell – general manager, Scottish Ambulance Service

==== Northern Ireland ====
- Graham Stott – Training Officer, Northern Ireland Ambulance Service

=== Overseas Territories Police and Fire Service Medal (OTPM) ===
==== Cyprus ====
- Moustafa Kemal – Chief Inspector, Sovereign Base Areas Police, Cyprus

=== Queen's Gallantry Medal (QGM) ===
- Ian Bugler – For the attempted rescue of a woman trapped in a cave
- PC Craig Nicholls – For the arrest of the murderer of Jo Cox MP
- PC Jonathan Wright – For the arrest of the murderer of Jo Cox MP

=== Queen's Commendation for Bravery ===
- Spencer Bell (deceased) – For attempting to save a life
- Chris Norman – For subduing an armed man
- Allen Pembroke – For aiding the victims of the Port El Kantaoui terrorist attack, 26 June 2015
- Paul Short – For aiding the victims of the Port El Kantaoui terrorist attack, 26 June 2015

== Crown Dependencies ==
Guernsey

- Wayne Bulpitt CBE
- Stephen Lansdown CBE
- Russell Finch OBE
- Lilian Bale MBE
- Vivian Webber BEM

Jersey

- William Bailhache Knight Bachelor
- Brian Heath MBE
- Paul Tucker MBE
- Carole Penfold MBE
- Pat Robson BEM
- Carole-Anne Robins BEM

Isle of Man

- Suzanne Harding MBE
- Trudi Williamson MBE
- Julia North BEM

== Australia ==
The Queen's Birthday Honours 2017 for Australia were announced on 12 June 2017 by the Governor-General, Sir Peter Cosgrove.

== Cook Islands ==
Below are the individuals appointed by Elizabeth II in her right as Queen of the Cook Islands with honours within her own gift, and with the advice of the Government for other honours.

=== The Most Excellent Order of the British Empire ===
==== Officer of the Order of the British Empire ====
- The Reverend Tuaine Ngametua. For services to the community.

==== Member of the Order of the British Empire ====
- Pani Iokopeta Ben. For services to the community.

=== British Empire Medal ===
- Saitu Marsters. For services to the community.
- Keu Mitchell. For services to the community.

== Grenada ==
Below are the individuals appointed by Elizabeth II in her right as Queen of Grenada with honours within her own gift, and with the advice of the Government for other honours.

=== The Most Excellent Order of the British Empire ===
==== Commander of the Order of the British Empire ====
- Victor Robinson Ashby. For services to Education

==== Officer of the Order of the British Empire ====
- Maureen Veronica Wilson. For services to Education.

==== Member of the Order of the British Empire ====
- Francis L. Mahon. For services to business.

=== British Empire Medal ===
- Anne Austin. For services in the field of Health and Community Work.
- Ann Greaves. For services in the field of Social Work.

== Papua New Guinea ==
Below are the individuals appointed by Elizabeth II in her right as Queen of Papua New Guinea with honours within her own gift, and with the advice of the Government for other honours.

=== Knight Bachelor ===
- Sang Chung Poh, MBE. For services to commerce and to the community through supporting charities and healthcare, particularly the Papua New Guinea Kidney Foundation.
- Nathaniel Poya. For services to the community and business, including as Chairman of the Papua New Guinea Ports Corporation.

=== The Most Distinguished Order of Saint Michael and Saint George ===
==== Companion of the Order of Saint Michael and Saint George ====
- Betty Palaso, OBE. For her leadership role in the public service as Head of the Internal Revenue Commission.
- Jacob Weis. For service to commerce, particularly investment, banking and business development.

=== The Most Excellent Order of the British Empire ===
==== Knight Commander of the Order of the British Empire ====
- Charles Watson Lepani, CBE. For distinguished public service in the enhancement of the nation's foreign relations, trade with Australia, and important communications.
- The Right Reverend Girege Wenge. For services to the community and to the Lutheran Church of Papua New Guinea through his leadership Ministry roles as Bishop and Head of the Church.

==== Commander of the Order of the British Empire ====
Civil Division

- Derek Michael Jepson. For services to commerce and to the community.
- Josephine Kiak, BEM. For services to education and to women's development.
- Robert W. Moore. For services to commerce and to the community through supporting healthcare.
- The Honourable Don Mumeyupe Sawong, MBE, Judge in the National and Supreme Courts. For services to the community and to the judiciary.

Military Division

- Colonel Joseph Ben. MBE, Papua New Guinea Defence Force.

==== Officer of the Order of the British Empire ====
Civil Division

- Emma Judith Faiteli. For public service in manpower planning and pay policy.
- Daryl Holmes. For services to health through support for YWAM Medical Ships.
- Vele Kagena. For services to agriculture and livestock training.
- James Kendeyagl. For service to local government and land mediation.
- Michael Koisen. For services to finance management, especially in connection with credit unions.
- Paulias Korni. For public service in information extension.
- Malcolm Leslie Lewis. For services to business and to the community.
- Kenneth Mulligan. For services to the community and to rural healthcare through YWAM Medical Ships.
- Pus Kera Nui. For services to business and to the community.
- Scott Gregory O'Reilly. For services to commerce and to the community.
- Max Hufanien Rai. For public service in foreign relations and trade.
- Michael Anthony Wheeler. For services to agriculture, particularly in coffee development.
- Kenankege H. Wickramaratne. For public service in civil works management.

Military Division

- Colonel Siale Diro, Papua New Guinea Defence Force

==== Member of the Order of the British Empire ====
Civil Division

- Lepokon Andu. For services to the Village Court and to the community.
- Isaac Baikuru. For services to rural healthcare.
- Colin Robert Benton. For services to agriculture.
- Regina Nua Boma. For services to general health and to women's development.
- Michael Lawrence Butler. For services to rural aviation and to the environment.
- Francis Maganbogl Dama. For services to business and to the community.
- Ingwai Dire. For service to local government and to the community.
- Rosemary Fabian. For services to rural healthcare.
- Teddy Igu. For services to education and to the community.
- Ruth Kange. For services to Southern Highlands provincial administration.
- The Reverend Kila Kilarupa. For services to the United Church.
- Dibilngga Kulang. For services to local government and to land mediation.
- Piuk Lasela. For services to the Church and to the community.
- Annette Leva. For services to education.
- Luso Lolan. For services to the community.
- Simon Mamot. For services to local government.
- Apakure Mogia. For services to education.
- Ludger Mond. For services to Simbu provincial administration.
- Peter O'Donohoe. For services to commerce and to business training.
- Arai Pula. For public service.
- Eric Sinebare. For public service.
- Ezekiel Mark Vene – For services to sport and to Government House.
- Thomas Bare Yoba. For public service.
- Brett Aaron Young. For services to business and to the community.

Military Division

- Commander (Navy) Mozart Vanamos. Papua New Guinea Defence Force.

=== British Empire Medal ===
Civil Division

- James Bai. For services to local government and to the community.
- Senior Sergeant Dage Dumpo. For services to the community and to the Police Force.
- Margaret Kaile. For services to rural healthcare.
- John Tugunde Kari. For services to rural healthcare.
- Masa Kia. For services to the community.
- Sebastian Komba. For services to the community.
- Senior Sergeant Fiona Banie Kovingre. For services to the Royal Papua New Guinea Constabulary.
- Lina Willie Kua. For services to rural healthcare.
- The Reverend Ravu Magani. For services to the United Church.
- Ellen Mana. For services to rural healthcare.
- Phillip Max Meauri. For services to youth development and to the Church.
- James John Mintik. For services to community development.
- Gilford Nelson. For services to Government House.
- Serah Poiya. For public service.
- Helen Rupa. For services to State Owned enterprises.
- Dellis Sause. For services to the community.
- Stephen Show. For public service.
- Tim Taesa. For public service.
- Amos Tami. For services to the Catholic Church.
- Samson Walizopa. For services to the community.
- Chief Sergeant Jack Sanson Wek. For services to the Royal Papua New Guinea Constabulary.
- Senior Sergeant Maryanne Yabara. For services to the Royal Papua New Guinea Constabulary.

Military Division

- Warrant Officer Joseph Iikme. Papua New Guinea Defence Force.
- Warrant Officer Karukuru Laho. Papua New Guinea Defence Force.
- chief warrant officerJoel Sorigi. Papua New Guinea Defence Force.
- Warrant Officer James Pinia Taule. Papua New Guinea Defence Force.
- chief warrant officerDubbo Smith Yonny. Papua New Guinea Defence Force.

=== Queen's Police Medal ===
- Chief Superintendent Norman Kambou. Royal Papua New Guinea Constabulary.
- Superintendent Jim Namora. Royal Papua New Guinea Constabulary.
- Chief Sergeant Maria Euga. Royal Papua New Guinea Constabulary.

== Solomon Islands ==
Below are the individuals appointed by Elizabeth II in her right as Queen of the Solomon Islands with honours within her own gift, and with the advice of the Government for other honours.

=== The Most Excellent Order of the British Empire ===
==== Officer of the Order of the British Empire ====
- Frank Vincent Prendergast. For services in the field of policing and community development.
- Emeritus Archbishop Adrian Thomas Smith. For services to the Church and to community development.

==== Member of the Order of the British Empire ====
- Jack Houtarau. For services to rural and community development.
- Grace Kilua. For services in the field of nursing and community development.
- Merle Hilly Ramo. For services to nursing and to the community.
- Greenpa Sibinyunyu Sibi. For services to nursing and community development.

=== British Empire Medal ===
- Roana Japhet Belo. For services to nursing and to the community.
- Ashwant Kumar Dwivedi. For services to community development.
- Miriam Tigita Houanimae. For services to nursing and to the community.
- Billy Mae. For services to vocational rural training and to community development.
- Thomas Manehunitai. For services to education, the Church and to rural community development.
- Chief Clement Rojumana. For services to rural and community development.
- Li Kwok Wing. For services to commerce and to community development.

== Tuvalu ==
Below are the individuals appointed by Elizabeth II in her right as Queen of Tuvalu with honours within her own gift, and with the advice of the Government for other honours.

=== The Most Excellent Order of the British Empire ===
==== Officer of the Order of the British Empire ====
- Tito Isala, MBE. For Public and Community Service.

==== Member of the Order of the British Empire ====
- Poopu Asuelu. For Public and Community Service.
- Lagasia Malona. For Public and Community Service.
- Teniku Talesi. For Public and Community Service.

=== British Empire Medal ===
- Maike Tausi. For Public and Community Service.
- Maukuku Tealofi. For Public and Community Service.
- Ekueta Telava. For Public and Community Service.

== Saint Lucia ==
Below are the individuals appointed by Elizabeth II in her right as Queen of Saint Lucia with honours within her own gift, and with the advice of the Government for other honours.

=== The Most Excellent Order of the British Empire ===
==== Commander of the Order of the British Empire ====
- Dr. George Martin Christopher Didier. For services to Health Care.

==== Officer of the Order of the British Empire ====
- Denise Joyce Auguste, MBE. For services to Music Education.
- Darren Julius Sammy. For services to Sports.

==== Member of the Order of the British Empire ====
- Gerald Cyril. For Public Service.
- Teddyson John. For services to Music.
- Peter Josie. For services to Agriculture.
- Sylvia Eroline Lamontagne. For outstanding contribution to the Business Sector.

=== British Empire Medal ===
- Thomas Daniel. For services to Education.
- Trevor Levi Ansel Daniel. For services to Sport.
- Francillia Jackson. For services to the Community.
- Kenty Candius Pamphile. For services to the Community.
- Veronica Phillips. For services to the development of Early Childhood Education.

== See also ==
- New Zealand Royal Honours System
- Orders, decorations, and medals of the United Kingdom
