= Lovestone =

Lovestone can refer to:

- Sir Simon Lovestone (born 1961), British neurologist
- Jay Lovestone (1897–1990), active in socialist and communist organizations in the United States
- Lovestoneites, a group led by the above
- A regional English name for Ivy

== See also ==
- "LoveStoned", a 2007 song by Justin Timberlake
- Lovestoned (band), a German-Swedish pop band
