= Norma Dawson =

Northern Irish academic and writer

Professor Norma Margaret Dawson CBE
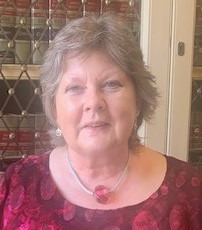
- Occupation(s): Legal historian and scholar
- Employer: Queens University Belfast

Norma Margaret Dawson CBE is Professor of Law at Queen's University Belfast.

She was appointed to a lectureship in the Faculty of Law at QUB in 1976, and became a senior lecturer in 1988, and professor of Law in 1995. She was head of the department of commercial and property law from 1989 to 1994, and director of the Law School and Dean of Faculty from 1994 to 1997. She chaired the university’s central student appeals committee from 2000 to 2004.

Dawson teaches property law and intellectual property law. She was awarded a British Academy Senior Research Fellowship for 2005-2006 to pursue research on legal history. Her current research interests are in the fields of trade mark law, property law and legal history. She has written and published books and articles in the fields of land law, charity law, trade mark law and legal history.

Dawson was appointed Commander of the Order of the British Empire (CBE) in the 2017 Birthday Honours for services to legal education and the development of the legal profession in Northern Ireland. She was awarded an honorary doctorate by University of Edinburgh in July 2023.

== Affiliations ==
Dawson is also vice president of the Irish Legal History Society, and a member of the society’s publications committee. She has been a trustee of the Hamlyn Trust, a member of the Broadcasting Council for N.I., the Law Reform Advisory Committee for Northern Ireland, the council of the Society of Legal Scholars, and the council of the Northern Ireland Medico-Legal Society.

== Publications ==
- The Power of Colour in Trademark Law (2001) European Intellectual Property Review, p. 382
- "English Trade Mark Law in the Eighteenth Century (2003) 24 Journal of Legal History, pp. 111–42
- Dying to Give: Trends in Charitable Giving by Will (with Sheena Grattan, Laura Lundy, Ruth Glenn and Gordon Cran) (2003) The Stationery Office, xxiv and 222 pages
- The Death Throes of the Licensing Act and the 'Funeral pomp' of Queen Mary II - 1695 (2005) 26 Journal of Legal History 119-42
- Reflections on Law and History (Editor) 2006, Dublin, Four Courts Press), xxii and 319 pages
