= Simon Lovestone =

Sir Simon Lovestone (born February 1961) is professor of translational neuroscience at the University of Oxford. Prior to this, he was Professor of Old Age Psychiatry and Neuroscience at the Institute of Psychiatry, part of King’s College London. He is a specialist in neurodegenerative disorders such as Alzheimer's disease and Parkinson's disease.

Lovestone was elected a Fellow of the Academy of Medical Sciences in 2008 and was appointed a knight bachelor in the 2017 Queen's Birthday Honours for services to neuroscience research.
