= Elspeth Finch =

Elspeth Finch MBE FREng
- Education: University of York Newcastle University University College London
- Employer(s): Indigo&
- Known for: City design and planning

Elspeth Finch MBE FREng (born December 1975) is the founder and CEO of IAND (Indigo & Limited). She won the 2013 Royal Academy of Engineering Silver Medal and was appointed MBE in 2018.

== Early life and education ==
Finch's mother was a medical physicist and her father was a physics professor. She likes to say that her engineering career 'is about removing friction'. She studied chemistry at the University of York when she was only 17. She completed a masters in transport and planning at the Newcastle University. She started a career in research and lecturing at University College London.

== Career ==
Finch's career journey spans government policy and transport engineering to software product design. At the age of 24, she founded her first business Intelligent Space Partnership, a transport consultancy that integrated the needs of pedestrians and cyclists into town planning. Here she developed software that uses technology to analyse how people move. She worked on the Boston Downtown Crossing and Regent Street strategy. She worked with the Metropolitan Police Service and Notting Hill Carnival. She sold Intelligent Space to Atkins as a FTSE 250 global infrastructure company in 2007.

After selling her company to Atkins she joined as a lead of the Futures team, identifying changes in populations' environments and societies and assessing their impact on infrastructure. She was the youngest ever director of Highways and Transportation. Finch was appointed UK Innovation Director of Atkins, where she was responsible for the 2009 redesign of London's Oxford Circus. She was responsible for Future Proofing Cities, a report looking to identify challenges in global urbanisation using evidence from 129 cities. In 2009 she was nominated as Management Today's 35 Women Under 35. She is the cofounder and CEO of the start-up Indigo&, a digital supplier management platform.

Finch is an advocate for more diversity in science and engineering. In 2013 she was awarded the Royal Academy of Engineering Silver Medal for her contributions to UK engineering. She was only the fourth woman ever to win the award. That year she was named as one of the Royal Society of Chemistry's 175 Faces of Chemistry. She is a member of the Royal Academy of Engineering Diversity and Inclusion panel. She is a judge for the Royal Academy of Engineering Launchpad competition for budding entrepreneurs. In January 2018 she was appointed a Member of the Order of the British Empire. In 2021 she was elected a Fellow of the Royal Academy of Engineering.
