= Apnalaya =

- Formation: 1973; 53 years ago
- Founder: Tom Holland
- Type: Non-profit organization
- Purpose: Improving quality of life of urban poor communities
- Headquarters: Mumbai, Maharashtra, India
- Location: India
- Services: Education, healthcare, livelihood development
- Award: GuideStar India Gold (2016)
- Formerly called: Holland Welfare Centre

Apnalaya, "our space" in English, is a non-profit organization, founded in 1973 by Tom Holland, who was then the Australian Consul General in Bombay. At that time it was called Holland Welfare Centre, which was a day care centre for labourers' children in Nariman Point, the place where National Centre for the Performing Arts (NCPA) stands today.

Apnalaya has been awarded the Guidestar India Gold as one of the most transparent NGO in 2016. Sachin Tendulkar's voice has been a big support to Apnalaya.

== History ==
Apnalaya, a Mumbai-based non-governmental organization, works in areas of education, livelihood, and healthcare. In the initial 6 months of pandemic induced lockdown in the year 2020, Apnalaya had raised over 64.6 million to provide relief to 230 thousand individuals and 18,910 households. The organization also engaged 50–65 youth volunteers from community and provided relief kits going door to door and also following social distancing norms.

Apnalaya is also providing dry ration, sanitary kits, fruits, vegetables and dry bank transfers in the 15 slum clusters it works and ensuring no household is abandoned in this time of distress. The organization was able to distribute 37,699 dry ration kits, 25,729 fruits and vegetable packets and had conducted over 2,185 direct bank transfers to help the most vulnerable sections of the society. Recently Indian cricket star batsman had joined hands with Apnalaya NGO to help 5000 people with one month ration.

Apnalaya was founded in the year 1973 and works to improve the life quality of five slum communities in India.
