= Ndidi Ekubia =

British silversmith (born 1973)

- Born: 1973 (age 52–53); Manchester
- Occupation: Silversmith

Ndidi Ekubia MBE, (born 1973) is a British silversmith.

== Life and career ==
Born in Manchester to Nigerian parents, Ekubia trained in 3D Design at Wolverhampton Polytechnic (now the University of Wolverhampton), graduating in 1995. After time spent developing her metalwork at the Bishopsland Educational Trust, she gained an MA in silversmithing and jewellery at the Royal College of Art (1996–98).

She is known for her work in silver, especially large vessel forms of fluid appearance, created by intensive hammer work. She describes the making process as "pushing the metal to its limit, emphasising the fluid vitality of each form."

In 2023 Ekubia's work was included in the exhibition Mirror Mirror: Reflections on Design at Chatsworth at Chatsworth House, and is also held in a number of public collections, including the Victoria and Albert Museum, London; Aberdeen Art Gallery and Museum; Crafts Council, London; Winchester Cathedral; and the Ashmolean Museum, Oxford. She was awarded an MBE for services to silversmithing in 2017.

In 2023 Ekubia appeared as a tutor in episode three of the television programme Bill Bailey's Master Crafters: The Next Generation.
