= East End Foods =

Asian food company based in England

East End Foods Ltd.
- Company type: Limited company
- Industry: Food Manufacture
- Founded: 1972
- Founder: Wouhra Brothers
- Headquarters: Watford, England, UK
- Area served: United Kingdom
- Owner: Exponent Private Equity
- Website: www.eastendfoods.co.uk

East End Foods is an Asian food company based in West Bromwich, England part of the Vibrant Foods Group. It was founded in 1972 by the Wouhra Brothers who sold the company in 2019. It has grown to be one of the largest Asian food companies in the United Kingdom and is now under the Vibrant Foods umbrella alongside brands; Cofresh, TRS and Everest Dairies. The company is now owned by Private Equity company Exponent. Its former cash and carries are now a totally separate business and no longer associated with the brand which was bought back by one of the original founding families.

== History ==
East End Foods was formed in 1972 in Wolverhampton, England, by Trilok and Kuldeep Singh Wouhra, Sikhs who were originally from New Delhi, India. Later their three younger brothers joined them in the business. Having been established in Wolverhampton it had since moved on through the West Midlands conurbation into Birmingham.

In early 2004 the eldest founding member and chairman Trilok (T.S) Wouhra died.

In November 2019 the company was sold to Exponent Private Equity. It is now part of Vibrant Foods. Shortly after the sale the youngest of the brothers, Don Wouhra, died of a sudden illness.

In 2020 Jasbir Wouhra and his immediate family bought the former cash and carry sites and now trade under their newly established company Lioncroft Wholesale.
