= Earl of Huntingdon's Regiment of Foot =

The Earl of Huntingdon's Regiment of Foot may refer to

- Theophilus Hastings, 7th Earl of Huntingdon's regiment, of which he was colonel 1685–1688, later 13th Regiment of Foot
- George Hastings, 8th Earl of Huntingdon's regiment, of which he was colonel 1702–1703, later 33rd Regiment of Foot
