= Nik Kotecha =

British pharmaceutical entrepreneur and philanthropist

Nik Kotecha OBE DL

Nik Kotecha is a British pharmaceutical entrepreneur and philanthropist. He founded Morningside Pharmaceuticals and led the company until its acquisition by Aspire Pharma in 2022.

He has served as Pro-Chancellor of De Montfort University and Pro-Chancellor (Enterprise) of the University of Leicester.

== Early life and education ==
Nikesh Rasiklal Kotecha was born in Uganda and came to the United Kingdom with his family in the early 1970s following the expulsion of Asians under the regime of Idi Amin.

He studied chemistry and completed a PhD at Imperial College London before undertaking research at the University of Cambridge. In 2023, he was awarded an honorary doctorate of science by the University of Leicester.

== Career ==
In 1991, Kotecha founded Morningside Pharmaceuticals, operating from the Midlands. The company exported medicines internationally to over 120 countries and later developed manufacturing capabilities for generic medicines. Morningside Pharmaceuticals received the Queen's Award for Enterprise: International Trade in 2012.

== Public and philanthropic work ==
Kotecha established the Randal Charitable Foundation, supporting projects which save and significantly improve lives in the UK and internationally.

In 2022, Kotecha was appointed Deputy Lieutenant of Leicestershire.

== Honours ==
Kotecha was appointed Officer of the Order of the British Empire (OBE) in the 2017 Birthday Honours.
