= Charles Freer =

Charles Freer may refer to:

- Charles Lang Freer (1854–1919), American industrialist and art collector
- Charles Freer (cricketer) (1809–1882), English cricketer and British Army officer

== See also ==
- Charles Freer Andrews (1871–1940), Anglican priest and Christian missionary
