= George Hastings, 8th Earl of Huntingdon =

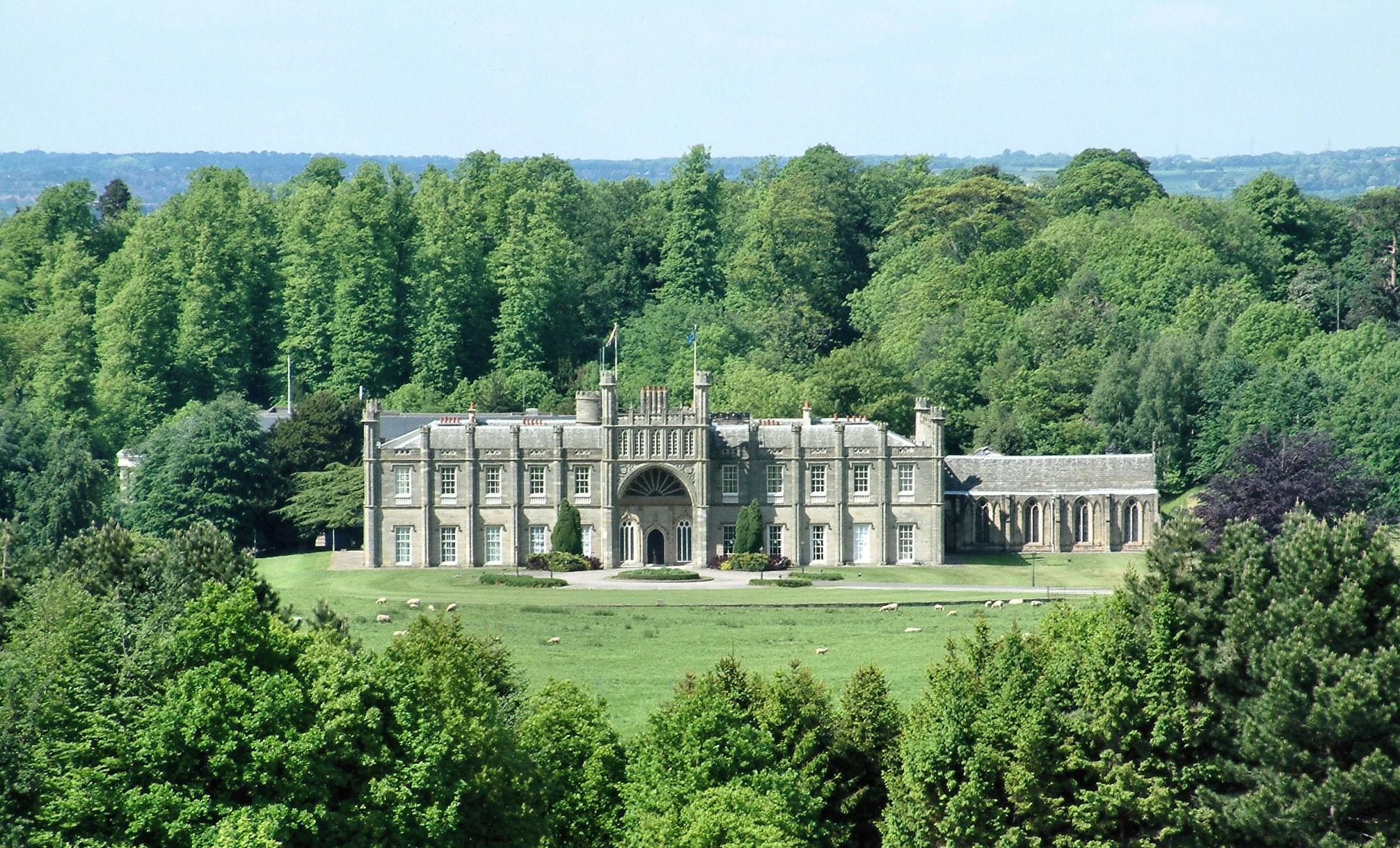
- The family seat, Donington Hall (this replaced the original in 1790)
- Born: 22 March 1677; Donington Hall, Leicestershire
- Died: 22 February 1705 (aged 27); London
- Burial place: St James, Piccadilly
- Relatives: Theophilus Hastings, 7th Earl of Huntingdon (father); Lady Elizabeth Hastings (sister)
- Military career
- Allegiance: (Kingdom of England) England
- Branch: British Army
- Service years: 1697 to 1703
- Rank: Colonel
- Unit: 33rd Foot, later Duke of Wellington's 1702–1703
- Conflicts: Nine Years War; War of the Spanish Succession; Sieges of Venlo and Kaiserswerth, 1702

George Hastings, 8th Earl of Huntingdon (22 March 1677 – 22 February 1705) was the son of Theophilus Hastings, 7th Earl of Huntingdon and his first wife Elizabeth Lewis; he succeeded his father in 1701.

He served briefly in the War of the Spanish Succession but left the army in 1703 and spent the next two years travelling in Europe. He returned to London, where he died of fever on 22 February 1705.

== Life ==
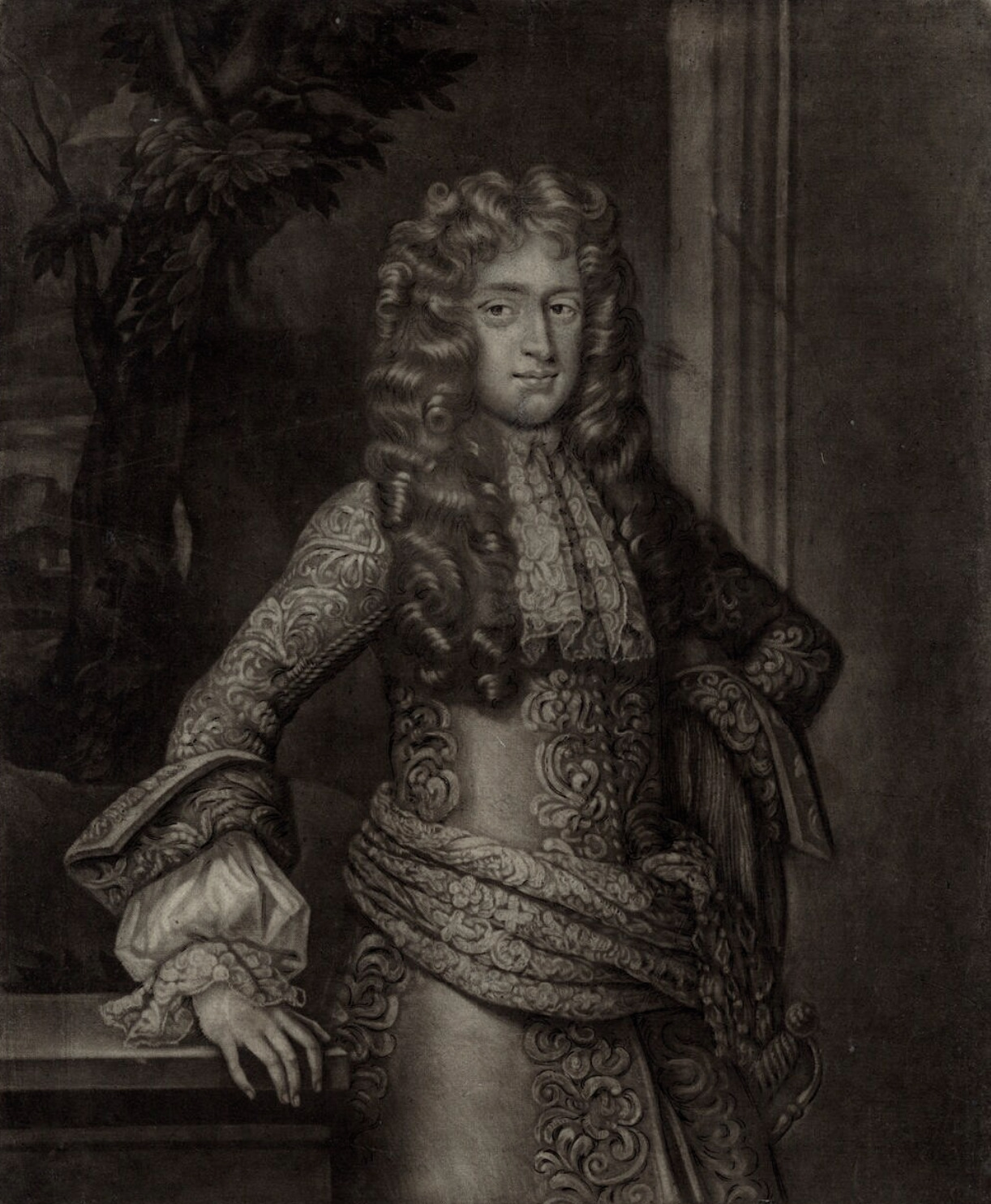
Hastings' father Theophilus

George Hastings was born in March 1677, son of Theophilus Hastings, 7th Earl of Huntingdon (1650–1701) and his first wife, Elizabeth Lewis (died 1688). His mother was the co-heiress of Sir John Lewis, a wealthy merchant who owned Ledston Hall, in West Yorkshire.

They had nine children, but only George and his sister Elizabeth (1682–1739) survived into adulthood. The two remained close friends until his death; in 1935, a collection of their letters was published by his distant relative, George Hastings Wheler. Elizabeth was an intelligent and energetic woman, who became a noted philanthropist and supporter of women's education.

Two years after Elizabeth Lewis died in 1688, the Earl married Mary Fowler (1664–1723), widow of Thomas Needham, 6th Viscount Kilmorey (1659-1687). They had two sons and four daughters; Ann (1691–1755), Catherine (1692–1739), Frances (1693–1750), Theophilus, 9th Earl of Huntingdon (1696–1746), Margaret (1699–1768) and Ferdinando (1699–1726).

Hastings succeeded as Earl when his father died in May 1701 but never married and the title passed to his half-brother Theophilus after his death in February 1705. He left an illegitimate son named Henry in Utrecht, who was brought up by Elizabeth and is thought to be the Henry Hastings who was treasurer of the Society for the Propagation of Christian Knowledge in 1747.

== Career ==
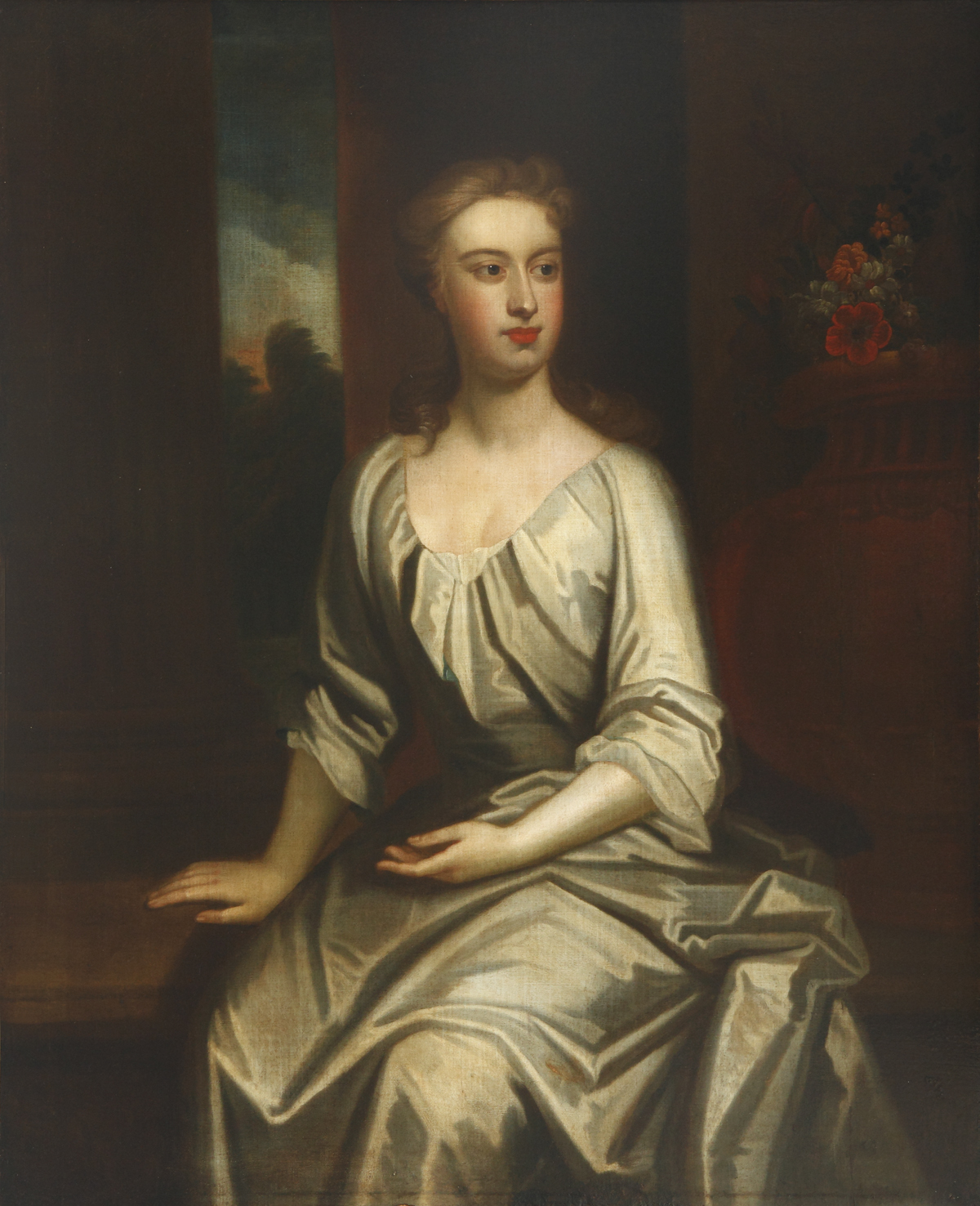
His sister Lady Elizabeth Hastings (1682-1739)

Hastings was initially sent to Eton College, but was so unhappy there, his father removed him. Thereafter, he was educated at Maidwell's School, a fashionable academy for members of the nobility, near modern-day Carnaby Street, London. He subsequently attended Wadham College, Oxford.

The 7th Earl was closely associated with James II and lost his offices after the November 1688 Glorious Revolution. Arrested during the Jacobite invasion scare of 1692, he was released without charge but was one of only five peers to vote against the 1701 Act of Settlement. He and George fought a long-running legal dispute over Elizabeth Lewis' estate, which was not resolved until 1703.

In December 1688, his father was removed as colonel of the 13th Foot and replaced by his cousin Ferdinand Hastings, who was dismissed for extortion in 1695. Despite this unpromising background, Hastings was appointed captain in the First Foot Guards, shortly before the Nine Years War ended in 1697. By 1699, he was a Lieutenant-Colonel and succeeded his father as Earl of Huntingdon in May 1701. He carried the Sceptre at the coronation of Queen Anne in April 1702; his half-brother Theophilus performed the same office when George I was crowned in 1714.

A close friend was his distant relative, James Stanhope (1673-1721), who led the Whig government from 1717 until his death in 1721. His father Alexander was a senior diplomat from a junior and less wealthy branch of the Earls of Chesterfield; in 1702, Hastings is thought to have provided James an annuity of £400 per year. Other friends included the Brudenell brothers, George, 3rd Earl of Cardigan and his younger brother James, who both had reputations for wild living.

When the army was expanded with the outbreak of the War of the Spanish Succession in 1701, Hastings was appointed Colonel of Huntingdon's, later 33rd Foot. This was posted to the Low Countries, where he was badly wounded in the June 1702 assault on Kaiserswerth. After the army went into winter quarters, he resigned and transferred his regiment to Henry Leigh.

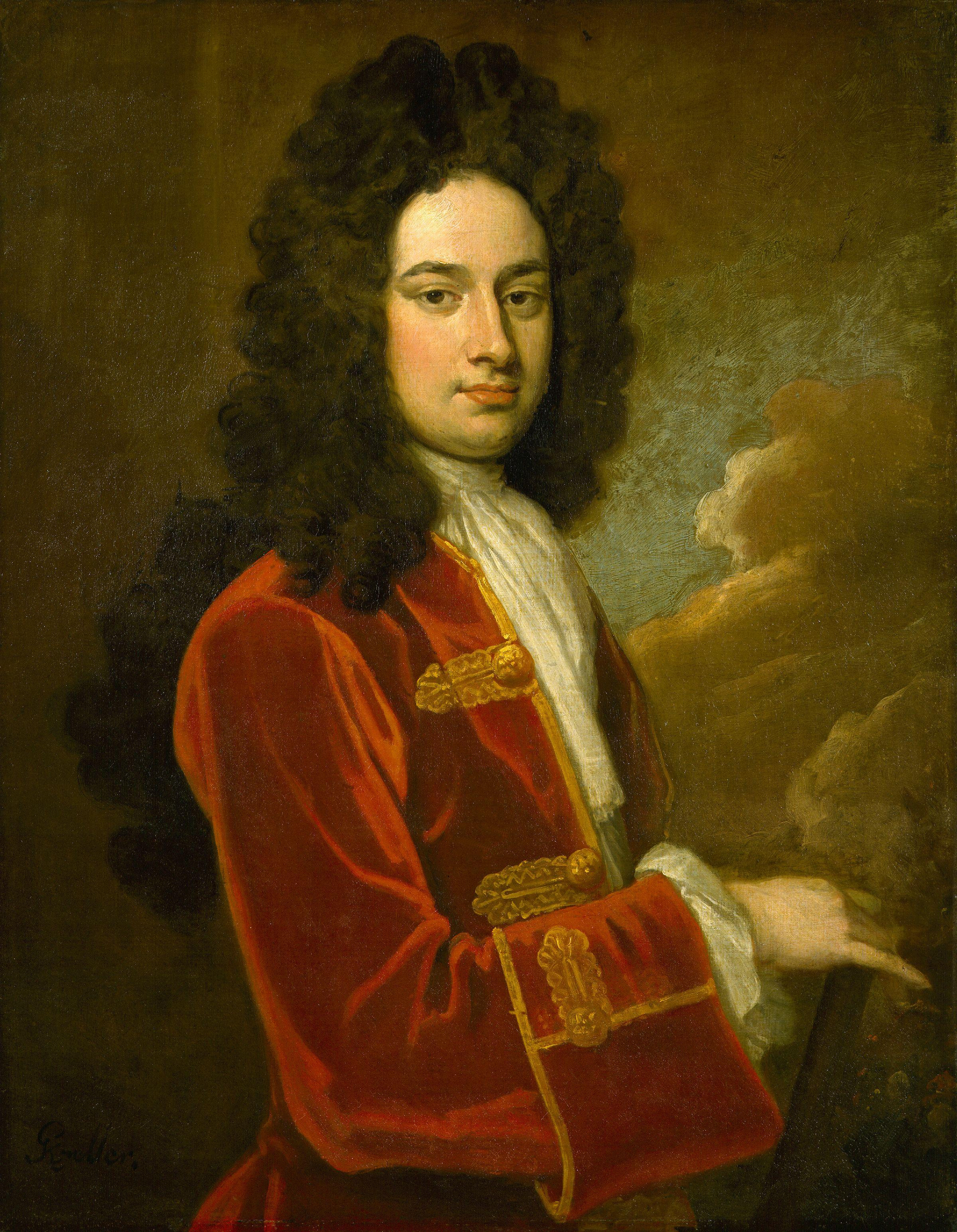
Portrait of James Stanhope by Godfrey Kneller. His friend and distant relative James Stanhope (1673-1721)

In early 1703, he travelled to Utrecht where he met the German orientalist, Heinrich Sieke, or Henry Sike (1669-1712). Hastings engaged Sike to accompany him to Constantinople, intending to study Arabic; they reached Vienna in May 1703, but decided against going further, as the plague was raging there. Instead, they went to Rome in January 1704.

Here Hastings met the Brudenells, who were in Italy from 1703 to 1706, and the Duke of Shrewsbury, a former Secretary of State, who left England in 1700 pleading ill-health. In April 1704, Shrewsbury recommended him to Richard Hill, British envoy in Turin, writing "he is a young man, extreme studious and of good parts...he was weary of the service (army), I know not why...(but) his qualities will be of assistance to you in Turin". Hill's correspondence indicates Hastings arrived there in May, but decided to return to the army in September 1704.

However, he changed his mind, writing to Elizabeth in October of his intention to 'live quietly at home...without a wife.' He and Sike returned to London, where he died suddenly on 22 February 1705; Elizabeth paid for an elaborate memorial at St James' Church, Piccadilly, which can still be found in the east gallery, south side. After the church suffered bomb damage during World War II, the memorial was apparently reassembled incorrectly.

== Sources ==
- Bell, Henry Nugent (1821). The Huntingdon Peerage. Baldwin, Cradock and Joy.
- Burke, John (1823). A General and Heraldic Dictionary of the Peerage and Baronetage of the. Henry Coburn.
- Dalton, Charles (1904). English army lists and commission registers, 1661-1714: Volume IV. Government and General Publishers.
- Forster, Leonard (1993). "Henry Sike of Bremen (1669-1712), Regius Professor of Hebrew & Fellow of Trinity". Transactions of the Cambridge Bibliographical Society. 10 (3): 249–277. JSTOR 41154824.
- Hamilton, Alastair (2004). "Sike, Henry (1669-1712)". Oxford Dictionary of National Biography (Online ed.). Oxford University Press. doi:10.1093/ref:odnb/72828. (Subscription, Wikipedia Library access or UK public library membership required.)
- Handley, Stuart (2002). "STANHOPE, James (1673-1721), of London". In Cruickshanks, Eveline; Handley, Stuart; Hayton, David W. (eds.). The History of Parliament: the House of Commons 1690-1715 (Online ed.). Boydell & Brewer.
- Hill, Richard (1845). Blackely, W. (ed.). The Diplomatic Correspondence of Richard Hill, Envoy to the Duke of Savoy, July 1703 to May 1706; Volume II. John Murray.
- Journals of the House of Commons, Volume 11; 1693-1697. House of Commons. 1803.
- Livingstone, Neil (1998). Yun, Lee Too (ed.). Pedagogy and Power: Rhetorics of Classical Learning. CUP. ISBN 978-0521594356.
- Scott, Beatrice (1983). "Lady Elizabeth Hastings". The Yorkshire Archaeological Journal. 55.
- Watson, Paula (2002). "BRUDENELL, Hon. James (c.1687-1746), of Luffenham, Rutland". In Cruickshanks, Eveline; Handley, Stuart; Hayton, David W. (eds.). The History of Parliament: the House of Commons 1690-1715 (Online ed.). Boydell & Brewer.
- Wheler, George Hastings (1935). Hastings Wheler family letters, 1693-1704: Lady Betty Hastings and her brother. Privately published.

Peerage of England
Preceded by Theophilus Hastings	Earl of Huntingdon; 1701–1705	Succeeded by Theophilus Hastings
Preceded by Theophilus Hastings	Baron Botreaux; 1701–1705	Succeeded by Theophilus Hastings
Military offices
New regiment	Colonel, 33rd Foot, later Duke of Wellington's; 1702–1703	Succeeded by Henry Leigh
