= Theophilus Hastings, 7th Earl of Huntingdon =

English politician and Jacobite (1650–1701)

The Right Honourable The Earl of Huntingdon PC
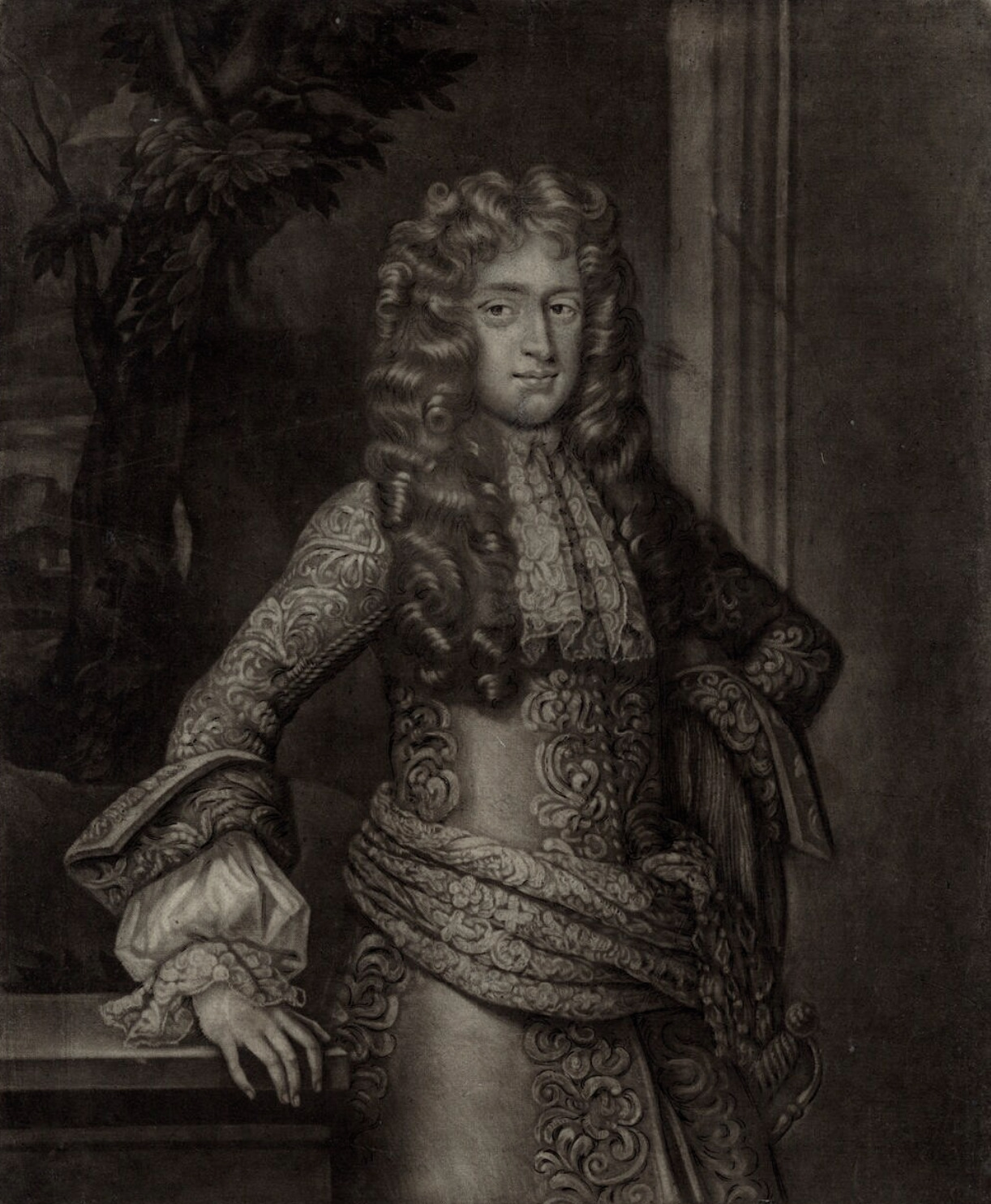
- Engraving by Robert Williams after a portrait by Sir Godfrey Kneller, c. 1687

Lord Lieutenant of Leicestershire
- In office 11 August 1687 – 6 April 1689
- Preceded by: Earl of Rutland
- Succeeded by: Earl of Rutland

Lord Lieutenant of Derbyshire
- In office 23 December 1687 – 16 May 1689
- Preceded by: Earl of Scarsdale
- Succeeded by: Duke of Devonshire

Privy Councillor
- In office 1683–1690

Personal details
- Born: 10 December 1650
- Died: 30 May 1701 (aged 50)
- Spouse(s): Elizabeth Lewis (1654–1688, her death); Mary Fowler (1664–1701, his death)
- Children: 15
- Parent(s): Ferdinando Hastings, 6th Earl of Huntingdon; Lucy Davies

Theophilus Hastings, 7th Earl of Huntingdon (10 December 1650 – 30 May 1701) was a 17th-century English politician and Jacobite. One of the few non-Catholics to remain loyal to James II of England after November 1688, on the rare occasions he is mentioned by historians, he is described as a 'facile instrument of the Stuarts,' a 'turncoat' or 'outright renegade.'

Once the leading political power in Leicestershire, his family had declined in influence; regaining that position became his primary ambition and drove his political choices. During the 1679 to 1681 Exclusion Crisis, he supported the removal from the succession of the Catholic heir, James, Duke of York, before switching allegiance in 1681. James succeeded as king in 1685 with widespread support but this collapsed when his religious measures and the methods used to enforce them seemed to undermine the legal system and the Church of England. By the end of 1687, Huntingdon was one of the few non-Catholics who continued to actively implement his policies.

Even among those who considered James the legitimate king after 1688, the vast majority viewed the primacy of the Church of England as non-negotiable; Hastings was considered to have actively persecuted his own church, a distinction that damaged his reputation among his contemporaries. One of 30 individuals excluded from the 1690 Act of Grace, he lost his offices but continued to attend the House of Lords and remained a committed Jacobite. He was arrested and charged with treason in 1692, although charges were later dropped; shortly before his death in May 1701, he was one of five peers who voted against the 1701 Act of Settlement barring Catholics from the throne.

His daughter Lady Elizabeth Hastings (1682–1739) became a noted philanthropist and supporter of women's education who established the 'Lady Elizabeth Hastings Charities'.

== Early life ==
Theophilus Hasting was born on 10 December 1650, fourth son of Ferdinando Hastings, 6th Earl of Huntingdon and his wife Lucy. They had ten children including Elizabeth. His three elder brothers died before his birth and he succeeded his father in 1656 at the age of five. Once the pre-eminent family in Leicestershire, the Hastings declined in influence after decades of over-spending and losses incurred during the 1642 to 1651 Wars of the Three Kingdoms. The 6th Earl remained neutral but his younger brother Henry commanded the Royalist garrison holding the family seat of Ashby de la Zouch Castle, which this was partially destroyed by Parliamentarian forces in 1648.

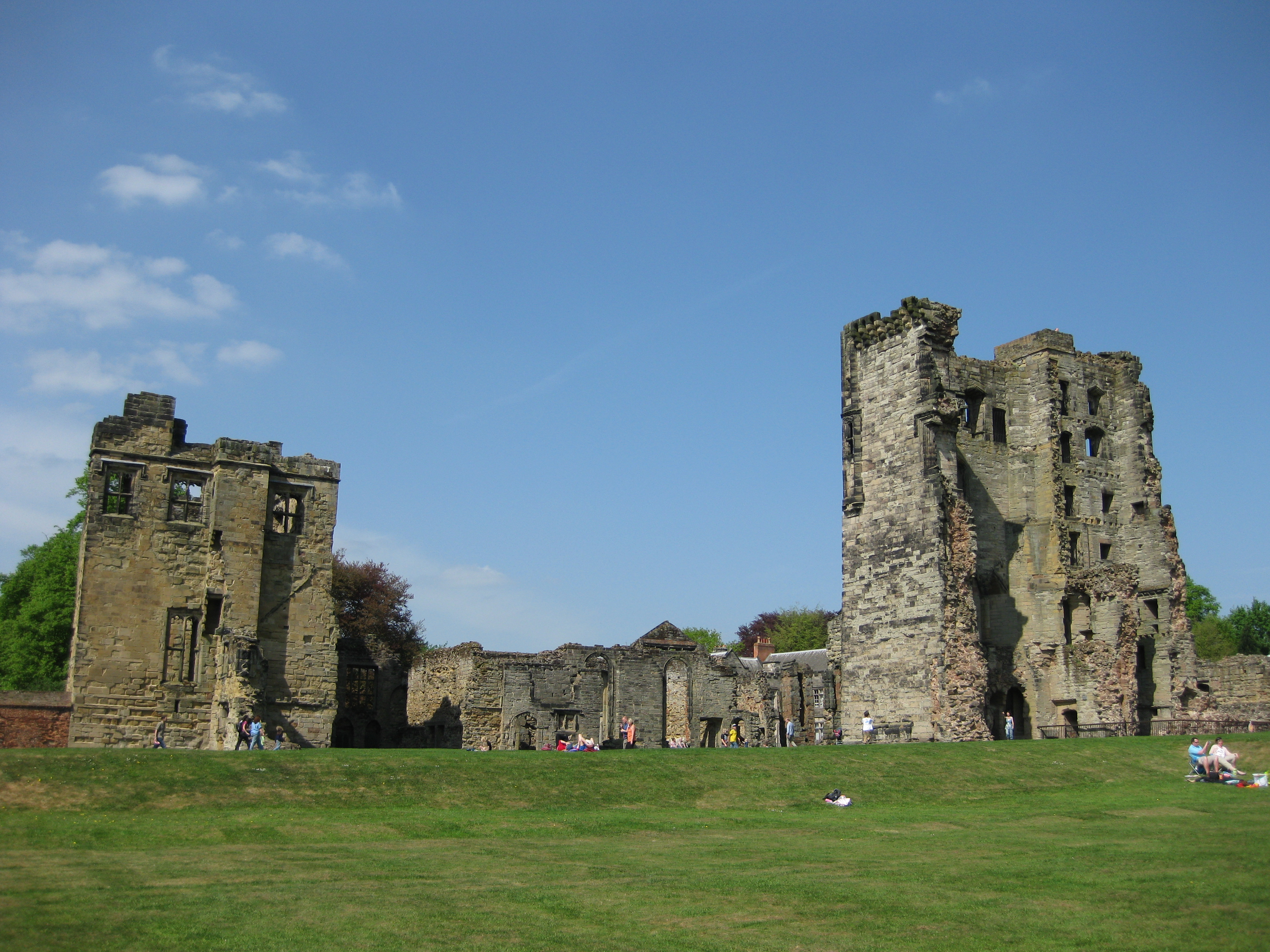
The original Hasting family seat, Ashby de la Zouch castle; partially destroyed or slighted in 1648 and never rebuilt

The family relocated to their estate at Donington Hall, where Hastings was educated by his mother and his uncle Henry, who returned from exile after The Restoration in 1660. He was also created Baron Loughborough and Lord Lieutenant of Leicestershire, an office held by the Hastings family almost continuously between 1550 and 1642. After Henry died in 1667, he was replaced by John Manners, 8th Earl of Rutland, and regaining this position became Hastings' overriding ambition.

In 1672, Hastings married Elizabeth Lewis (died 1688), whose sister Mary (died 1684) was the wife of the Earl of Scarsdale; the two were co-heiresses of Sir John Lewis, a wealthy merchant who owned Ledstone Hall, in West Yorkshire. They had nine children, only two of whom survived to adulthood; George, 8th Earl of Huntingdon (1677–1704) and Lady Elizabeth Hastings (1682–1739), a noted supporter of women's education.

Elizabeth died in 1688 and two years later, Hastings married Mary Fowler, the wealthy widow of Thomas Needham, 6th Viscount Kilmorey. They had two sons and four surviving daughters: Ann (1691–1755), Catherine (1692–1739), Frances (1693–1750), Theophilus, 9th Earl of Huntingdon (1696–1746), Margaret (1699–1768) and Ferdinando (1699–1726).

== Career ==
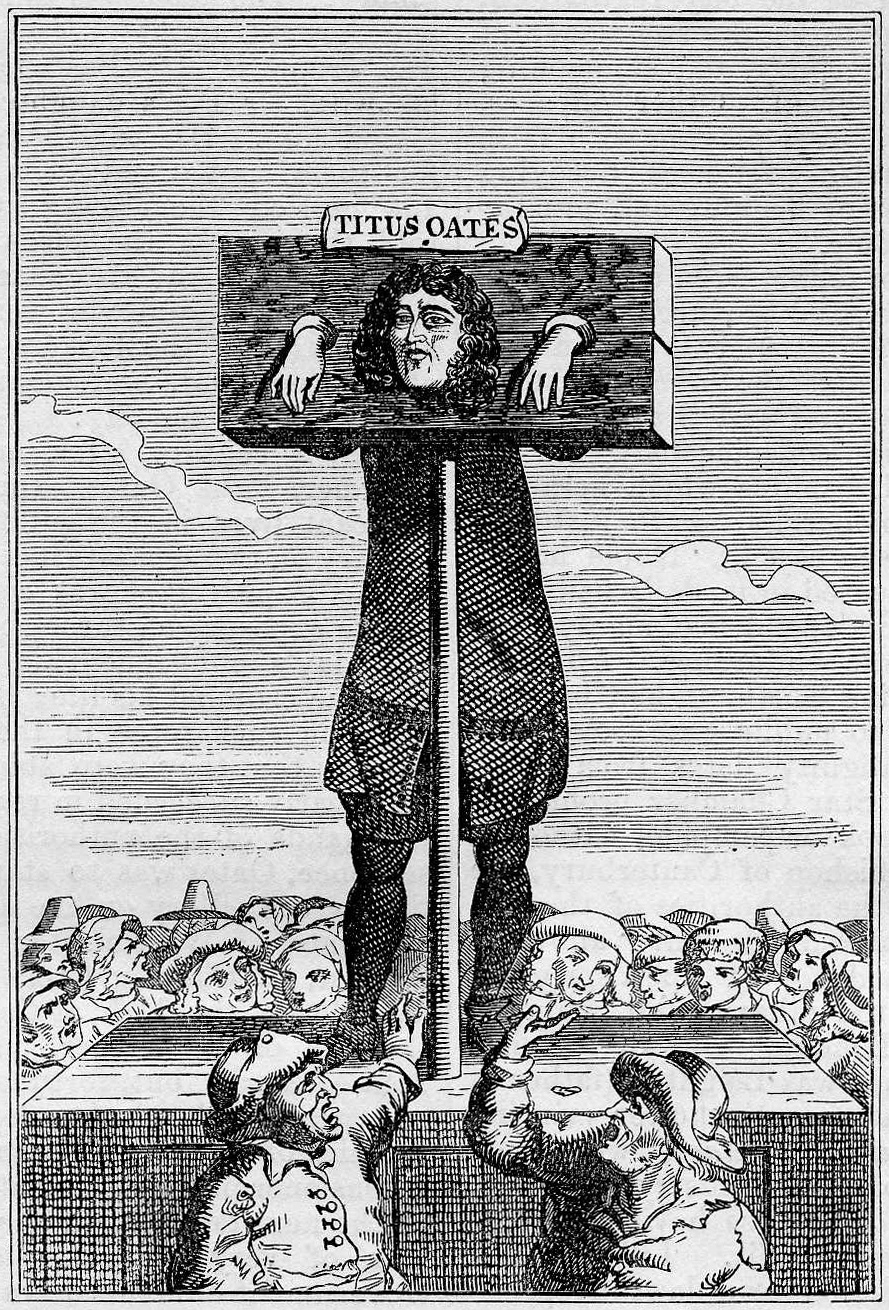
Unrest caused by the Popish Plot led to the arrest of Titus Oates in August 1681; previously a supporter, Hasting changed sides and became a government loyalist

Hastings took his seat in the Lords and was a reliable supporter of the Crown until 1677, when the 9th Earl of Rutland succeeded his father as Lord Lieutenant. The Manners family supported Parliament in the Civil Wars, and Hastings was frustrated by a perceived lack of gratitude for his family's service. He joined the faction led by Shaftesbury, who opposed Charles' efforts to rule without Parliament and campaigned against 'Popery and arbitrary government.' The potential succession of the Catholic, pro-French Duke of York was seen as another step towards absolutism and led to the 1679–1681 Exclusion Crisis. Hastings became a prominent supporter; at a public dinner in 1679, he proposed a toast to the Protestant Duke of Monmouth, viewed as an alternative to James, and 'confusion to Popery', prompting a heated exchange with other guests.

During the anti-Catholic campaign known as the Popish Plot in 1680, Hastings voted for the execution of Viscount Stafford, as did seven of eight members of Stafford's own family. It led to the execution of 22 alleged conspirators and caused widespread unrest; in August 1681, Titus Oates, source of the accusations, accused the Queen of conspiring to poison Charles.

This was seen as going too far and many now withdrew their support, including Hastings; banned from Court in 1680, he was restored to favour in October 1681. In February 1682, he paid Scarsdale £4,500 for his post as Captain of the Honourable Band of Gentlemen Pensioners, a ceremonial bodyguard with close access to the monarch. He was appointed to the Privy Council in 1683 and when James became king in February 1685, he was made Justice in eyre and colonel of an infantry regiment.

At the start of his reign, James had widespread backing, inheriting a legislature so dominated by his supporters it became known as the Loyal Parliament. Memories of the 1638 to 1651 Wars of the Three Kingdoms meant the majority feared the consequences of removing the 'natural' heir; this caused the rapid collapse of the Monmouth and Argyll rebellions in June 1685. However, the Church of England and the legal system were key elements of a stable society; James' religious policies undermined the former, and attempts to enforce them attacked the latter. When Parliament refused to pass his measures, it was suspended in November 1685 and thereafter he ruled by decree; the principle was accepted, but the scope and approach were not, and judges who opposed his interpretation were dismissed.

This forced James to rely on a few loyalists, one being Hastings, who was made a member of the Commission for Ecclesiastical Causes in July 1686. A number of people, including his first wife, accused him of being a secret Catholic; if true, this was controversial, since the commission was set up to enforce compliance on the Church of England. Suspicions increased when he was exempted from the 1678 Test Act requiring officeholders to swear to uphold 'the Protestant religion.' In late 1687, James tried to ensure a Parliament that would vote for his Declaration of Indulgence; only those who confirmed their support for repealing the Test Act would be allowed to stand for election as Member of Parliament. Lord-Lieutenants were to administer the so-called 'Three Questions'; many resigned rather than do so, including Scarsdale, whom Huntingdon replaced as Lord Lieutenant of Derbyshire.

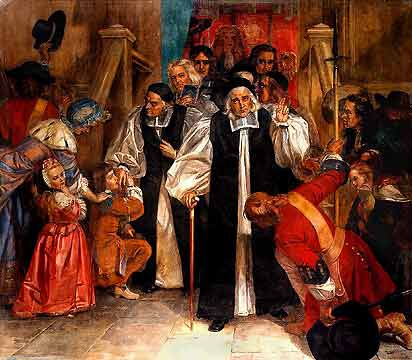
The Seven Bishops after their acquittal, June 1688; signing their arrest warrant severely impacted Hastings' later reputation

Combined with the trial of the Seven Anglican bishops for seditious libel in June 1688, James' policies now seemed to go beyond tolerance for Catholicism and Nonconformists and into an assault on the Church of England. James was now abandoned by most of his supporters, including Lord Chancellor Jeffreys; when he refused to sign the warrant committing the bishops to the Tower of London, Hastings did so instead, which was later held against him.

Wild celebrations when the bishops were acquitted made it seem only James' deposition could prevent widespread civil unrest and the vast majority of his Tory supporters abandoned him. The seven signatories of the Invitation to William asking him to assume the English throne included representatives from the Tories, the Whigs, the Church and the Navy. During the Glorious Revolution in November 1688, Hastings and his regiment were sent to secure Plymouth; on arrival, he was arrested by its governor, the Earl of Bath, who declared for William. He was released on 26 December, two days after his wife died in childbirth; as one of thirty individuals exempted from the 1690 Act of Grace, he forfeited his offices although he continued to attend the Lords.

He initially retained some local influence and in 1690, his support helped elect Sir Edward Abney, Tory candidate for Leicester. Thereafter the borough was dominated by the Manners family and he withdrew from active politics. As a committed Jacobite, Hastings was arrested during the 1692 invasion scare, allegedly because his stables were 'full of horses'. After the March 1696 Jacobite assassination plot, he voted against the execution of Sir John Fenwick and refused to take the loyalty oath imposed by Parliament. One of his last acts was to vote against the Act of Settlement that disinherited the Catholic Stuart exiles in favour of the Protestant Sophia of Hanover. His later years were dominated by a long-running legal dispute with his eldest son over his first wife's estates, which was settled only after his death. He died in London on 30 May 1701 and was succeeded by George, who served in the Low Countries during the War of the Spanish Succession and died of fever in 1705.

Although Hasting was a minor political figure and not unusual in changing sides, on the rare occasions he is mentioned by historians, he is described as a 'facile instrument of the Stuarts,' a 'turncoat' or 'outright renegade.' His reputation for inconsistency increased during the 1689 Convention Parliament, when he voted first against a Regency, then with the Jacobite loyalists, and finally in favour of making William king. Historian Peter Walker argues all other issues were secondary to restoring his family's position, but 'continued loyalty to James in his last years suggests (he) was not a man bereft of principle.'

== Sources ==
- Belsham, William (1802). Appendix to the History of Great Britain, from the Revolution, 1688, to the Treaty of Amiens, A.D. 1802 Volume 1 (2014 ed.). Book on Demand Ltd. ISBN 5518964153.
- Curtis, John (1831). A Topographical History of the County of Leicester (2017 ed.). Forgotten Books. ISBN 1528215095.
- Childs, John (1986). Army, James II and the Glorious Revolution. Manchester University Press. ISBN 0719006880.
- Dalton, Charles (1896). English army lists and commission registers, 1661-1714. Government and General Publishers.
- Halliday, Paul (2009). "Jeffreys, George, first Baron Jeffreys (1645–1689)". Oxford Dictionary of National Biography (online ed.). Oxford University Press. doi:10.1093/ref:odnb/14702. (Subscription, Wikipedia Library access or UK public library membership required.)
- Hanham, Andrew (2002). Borough of Leicester in The History of Parliament: the House of Commons 1690-1715. Boydell & Brewer.
- Harris, Tim (2006). Revolution: The Great Crisis of the British Monarchy, 1685–1720. Allen Lane. ISBN 978-0-7139-9759-0.
- Holmes, Richard (2009). Marlborough; England's Fragile Genius. Harper Press. ISBN 978-0007225729.
- House of Commons Journal Volume 11: 19 February 1695. Journal of the House of Commons. Vol. 11, 1693–1697. House of Commons. 1803.
- Jones, Clyve; Jones, David (1986). Peers, Politics and Power: House of Lords, 1603-1911. Hambledon Continuum. ISBN 0907628788.
- Kenyon, JP (1972). Popish Plot. William Heinemann Ltd. ISBN 978-0434388509.
- Livingstone, Neil (1998). Yun, Lee Too (ed.). Pedagogy and Power: Rhetorics of Classical Learning. CUP. ISBN 978-0521594356.
- Miller, John (1978). James II; A study in kingship. Menthuen. ISBN 978-0413652904.
- Miller, John (January 2012). "Book Review; James II and the Three Questions: Religious Toleration and the Landed Classes, 1687–1688 by Peter Walker". Catholic Historical Review. 98 (1). doi:10.1353/cat.2012.0053. S2CID 162247466.
- Historic England. "Ledston Hall & Gardens (Grade II) (1001221)". National Heritage List for England.
- Patterson, Catherine F (2004). "Hastings, Theophilus, seventh earl of Huntingdon". Oxford Dictionary of National Biography (online ed.). Oxford University Press. (Subscription, Wikipedia Library access or UK public library membership required.)
- Tapsell, Peter (2007). The Personal Rule of Charles II, 1681-85: Politics and Religion in an Age of Absolutism. Boydell Press. ISBN 978-1843833055.
- Vallance, Edward (2005). Revolutionary England and the National Covenant: State Oaths, Protestantism, and the Political Nation, 1553-1682. Boydell Press. ISBN 978-1-84383-118-1.
- Walker, Peter (1956). James II and the Three Questions: Religious Toleration and the Landed Classes, 1687-1688 (2010 ed.). Verlag Peter Lang. pp. 62–64. ISBN 978-3039119271.
- Walker, Peter (1977). "The political career of Theophilus Hastings (1650-1701), 7th Earl of Huntingdon". Transactions of the Leicestershire Archaeological and Historical Society (71).
- Western, J. R. (1972). Monarchy and Revolution: The English State in the 1680s. Blandford. ISBN 9780713732801.

Legal offices
Preceded by The Earl of Chesterfield	Justice in Eyre south of the Trent; 1686–1689	Succeeded by The Lord Lovelace
Military offices
New regiment	Colonel, Earl of Huntingdon's Foot; 1685–1688	Succeeded by Ferdinando Hastings
Honorary titles
Preceded by The 2nd Earl of Denbigh	Custos Rotulorum of Leicestershire; 1675–1680	Succeeded by The 3rd Earl of Denbigh
Preceded by The 3rd Earl of Denbigh	Custos Rotulorum of Leicestershire; 1681–1689	Succeeded by The Earl of Stamford
Preceded by The Earl of Scarsdale	Captain of the Gentlemen Pensioners; 1682–1689	Succeeded by The Lord Lovelace
Preceded by The Earl of Scarsdale	Lord Lieutenant of Derbyshire; 1687–1688	Succeeded by The Earl of Devonshire
Preceded by The Earl of Rutland	Lord Lieutenant of Leicestershire; 1687–1689	Succeeded by The Earl of Rutland
Peerage of England
Preceded by Ferdinando Hastings	Earl of Huntingdon; 1656–1701	Succeeded by George Hastings
