= Listed buildings in Ledston =

Ledston is an unparished area in the metropolitan borough of the City of Leeds, West Yorkshire, England. It contains 20 listed buildings that are recorded in the National Heritage List for England. Of these, four are listed at Grade I, the highest of the three grades, two are at Grade II*, the middle grade, and the others are at Grade II, the lowest grade. The unparished area contains the village of Ledston and the surrounding countryside. The most important building in the unparished area is Ledston Hall, which is listed, together with a number of associated structures. The other listed buildings are a farmhouse, farm buildings, two mileposts, and two former winding houses at a colliery that has closed.

== Key ==
Grade	Criteria
I	Buildings of exceptional interest, sometimes considered to be internationally important
II*	Particularly important buildings of more than special interest
II	Buildings of national importance and special interest

== Buildings ==
Name and location	Photograph	Date	Notes	Grade
Ledston Hall; 53.75505°N 1.34117°W		c. 1200	A country house that originated as a monastic building, and was greatly extended through the centuries, particularly during the 17th century. The house has a U-shaped plan with a main range of eleven bays, and protruding four-bay wings. There are two storeys over a basement, the lower storey forming a piano nobile. Steps with wrought iron balustrades lead up to a central doorway with a moulded architrave, an entablature on carved consoles, and an open pediment in which is a carved eagle. Most of the windows are sashes, and at the top are five Dutch gables containing vertical oval windows and surmounted by pediments. At the corners of the wings are turrets, each with a modillion cornice, an ogee-shaped pyramidal lead cap, and a ball finial, and between each pair of turrets is a Dutch gable.	I
Barn east of Sheepcote Farmhouse; 53.76898°N 1.33434°W	—	16th century (or earlier)	The barn is timber framed and is clad in magnesian limestone. It has quoins, and a roof of stone slate partly replaced with Welsh slate. There is a rectangular plan with five bays, and the barn contains a wagon entrance, doorways and triangular vents.	II
Barn, Ledston Hall; 53.75472°N 1.33933°W	—	17th century	The barn on the east side of the stable yard is in magnesian limestone, with a continuous drip course, and a stone slate roof with coped gables and kneelers. There are two storeys, a rectangular plan, and a symmetrical font of five bays. In the centre are double doors in a large semicircular arch with imposts and a hood, and the outer bays contain smaller doorways in similar, smaller arches. In the ground floor are cross windows, and the upper floor contains two-light mullioned windows.	I
Stable block, Ledston Hall; 53.75484°N 1.33984°W		17th century	The former stable block is in magnesian limestone, with a band, and a stone slate roof with coped gables and kneelers. There are two storeys, and an H-shaped plan consisting of a range of seven bays, and projecting two-bay gabled cross-wings. In the centre is a round-arched doorway with voussoirs, and the outer bays contain smaller doorways. Some of the windows are mullioned, and others are cross windows.	I
Stable yard wall, Ledston Hall; 53.75459°N 1.34003°W	—	17th century (probable)	The wall enclosing the stable yard on the south, west and north sides is in magnesian limestone with pitched coping. It is about 2 metres (6 ft 7 in) high, and in the centre of the south side is a gateway with flanked by piers with ball finials.	II
Barn, stables, and granary north of Manor Farmhouse with wall 53.75288°N 1.34385°W	—	17th century	The farm buildings have been converted for residential use. The oldest was the granary, the rest dating from the 18th century. The buildings are in magnesian limestone with quoins and stone slate roofs, and they form an L-shaped plan. The barn had opposing wagon entries, a doorway, a loading door and vents, and the other buildings are at right angles. The other sides of the yard are enclosed by a wall with round coping.	II
Sheepcote Farmhouse; 53.76907°N 1.33493°W		17th century	The farmhouse, which has been altered and extended, is in magnesian limestone with a slate roof. There are two storeys, a double depth plan with a later parallel rear range, and four bays. Most of the windows are sashes, there is a blocked three-light mullioned window, and in the added range are segmental-headed windows.	II
Entrance gates and lodges, Ledston Hall; 53.75457°N 1.34037°W	—	Late 17th century (probable)	The earliest part is the gateway, the lodges were added in the 18th century, and all are in magnesian limestone. The gateway is a square-headed opening in a rusticated surround, over which is a cornice containing voussoirs, and a segmental pediment broken in the centre by a pedestal surmounted by a carved coat of arms. In the gateway are wrought iron gates, and flanking this are cubic lodges set diagonally. Each lodge has an impost band, and a round-headed doorway and windows, all with a moulded architrave, a triple keystone, a frieze, a moulded cornice, and a parapet with corner urns.	I
Garden house, Ledston Hall; 53.75537°N 1.34162°W	—	c. 1720	The garden house at the north end of the west terrace is in brick on a plinth of magnesian limestone, with stone dressings and a hipped slate roof. It is tall with a single storey and a basement, and has a stone entrance in Venetian style, with a dentilled cornice, and a moulded eaves cornice. In the left return is a sash window with a keystone, and at the rear is a round-headed basement door.	II*
Gate and steps to sunken garden, Ledston Hall; 53.75443°N 1.34123°W	—	18th century (probable)	The gates and steps lead from the south end of the west terrace to the sunken garden. The gates are in wrought iron, and there are nine stone steps with moulded treads.	II
Gatepiers on former drive, Ledston Hall; 53.75647°N 1.34142°W	—	Mid 18th century	The gate piers are in sandstone and magnesian limestone. The inner piers are large, about 1 metre (3 ft 3 in) square and about 8 metres (26 ft) high. Each pier has a moulded plinth, a vermiculated panel on each face, a prominent moulded cornice, and an elaborately carved urn finial. On the outer side of each is a scrolled console, and a wall ramping down to a simpler inner pier with a ball finial.	II*
Gate piers to former north drive, Ledston Hall; 53.75956°N 1.34330°W	—	18th century	The remaining outer pair of piers, originally in a larger set. They are in magnesian limestone with a square section and are about 3 metres (9.8 ft) high. Each pier has a moulded band and a cap, and a large ball finial.	II
Loggia in sunken garden, Ledston Hall; 53.75455°N 1.34132°W	—	18th century	The loggia, which forms the south end of the west terrace, is in brick with dressings in magnesian limestone. It has a square plan and contains two arches on the west front and one on the south front, and has a chamfered plinth, impost bands, keystones, and a parapet with flat copings.	II
Statue in sunken garden, Ledston Hall; 53.75473°N 1.34291°W	—	18th century (probable)	The statue is probably in marble, and has a square pedestal about 1 metre (3 ft 3 in) high. On it stands a life-sized female figure in flowing robes, apparently playing a musical instrument and singing.	II
Steps in terraces (west), Ledston Hall; 53.75492°N 1.34164°W	—	18th century	There are two consecutive straight flights of steps leading down to the sunken garden from the upper grassed terrace. They are in magnesian limestone with moulded treads, and at the top of each flight is a pair of urns.	II
Steps in terraces (east), Ledston Hall; 53.75520°N 1.34042°W	—	18th century (probable)	There are two sets of diverging steps, each of two flights. They are in stone with moulded treads.	II
Milepost at 427 282; 53.74869°N 1.35501°W	—	Mid 19th century (probable)	The milepost is on the east side of Barnsdale Road (A656 road). It is in stone with cast iron overlay, and has a triangular section and a rounded top. Inscribed on the upper part is "HOOK MOOR BRANCH LEDSTONE" and "BARNSDALE & LEEDS ROAD", and on the sides are the distances to Boroughbridge, Doncaster, Wetherby, Pontefract, Aberford and Castleford.	II
Milepost at 429 314; 53.77851°N 1.34935°W		Mid 19th century (probable)	The milepost is on the east side of Barnsdale Road (A656 road). It is in stone with cast iron overlay, and has a triangular section and a rounded top. Inscribed on the upper part is "HOOK MOOR BRANCH KIPPAX" and "BARNSDALE & LEEDS ROAD", and on the sides are the distances to Boroughbridge, Doncaster, Wetherby, and Pontefract.	II
No. 1 Winder, Ledston Luck Colliery, wall and gate 53.77173°N 1.35020°W		1911	The winding house is in red brick with sandstone dressings, on a plinth, with a parapet, and corner pylons. On the front, the centre is recessed and contains a segmental-arched doorway in a semicircular archway with a moulded surround. Above this is a six-light mullioned window, a moulded cornice on corbels, and a parapet with a dated panel. Flanking this are pylons that contain a six-light window with an apron below, and a raised panel above with swags. In the left return are openings for drive cables, and in the right return is a 15-light window. In front, enclosing a garden, is a brick wall with stone coping.	II
No. 2 Winder, Ledston Luck Colliery; 53.77166°N 1.34934°W		1911	The winding house is in red brick with sandstone dressings, and a corrugated asbestos roof. The centre is recessed, and on the front is a flight of steps to a doorway. To the right of this is a twelve-light mullioned and transomed window, over which is a moulded cornice and a parapet. This is flanked by pylons with buttresses, each containing a three-light mullioned window, above which is an embattled parapet with a central panel. At the rear are three large small-paned segmental-headed windows.	II
