= Mary Pannal =

English herbalist and cunning woman accused of witchcraft

- Died: 1603; York or Castleford, Kingdom of England
- Known for: Executed for witchcraft

Mary Pannal (died 1603) was an English herbalist and cunning woman who was accused of, and executed for, witchcraft in 1603.

== Biography ==
Mary lived in Ledston, West Yorkshire where she had a reputation as a cunning woman or witch. She was accused of witchcraft following the death of a young child named William Witham in 1593 to whom she had administered a herbal mixture.

The spelling of her married name was possibly Pannell and she may have been born Marye Tailer. In the Kippax Parish Registers an entry for the year 1558 shows 'John Pannell & Marye Tailer [9th] of Julie (July) married.' Subsequently, in 1568 Raphe Pannell who may have been their son is shown as having been born but died the same year, with an Elizabeth Pannell being born in 1569. Then in 1570, there is a record of a baptism of 'John Pannell the [15th] of June...' In 1575 there is another record of baptism 'Agnes Pannell the [19th] of Sept...'.

The location and method of her execution are unclear; she was either hanged in York after her trial or burnt at the stake near Castleford.

== Legacy ==
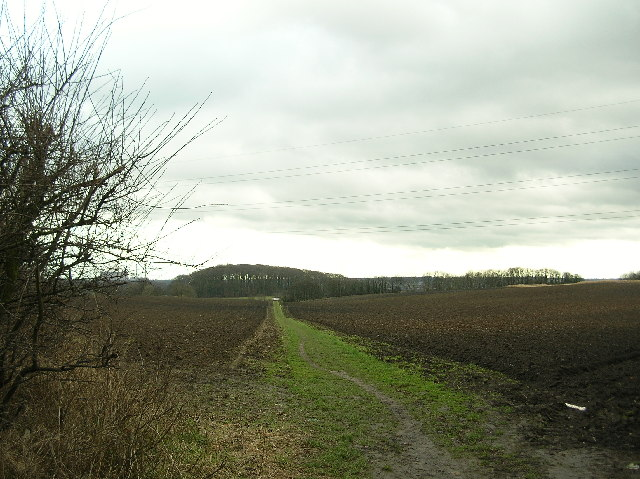
Footpath from Kippax to Mary Panel Hill in West Yorkshire

The ghost of Mary Pannal is said to haunt the woods near Pannal Hill, near Castleford. The suggestion is that if someone sees her ghost, which will be leading a horse, then someone close to them will die.

A play inspired by her biography, Maleficium! The Life, Trial, and Death of Mary Pannal, was written by Chris Gibson.

In an episode of the 2021 British sitcom Ladhood, characters spend the night in an area said to be haunted by Pannal.

A novel based on the true story of Mary Pannal, written by Melissa Manners, was published in 2022, The Pannell Witch. The prequel, Becoming The Pannell Witch, was published in the same year.
