= Thomas Merry =

Member of the Parliament of England

Thomas Merry (c. 1605 - 1682) was an English landowner, mathematician and politician who sat in the House of Commons in 1660.

== Biography ==
Merry was the son of Sir Thomas Merry of The Winns, Walthamstow, Essex, and his wife Mary Freeman. His father was clerk-comptroller of the green cloth who received large grants of crown lands from James I which were plundered during the Civil War for his Royalist support. Merry matriculated at Christ Church, Oxford on 6 December 1626, aged 21. He was a student of Middle Temple in 1627. He was a J.P. for Leicestershire from 1641 to 1650. In 1654 he succeeded to the estates including Gopsall on the death of his father. In March 1660 he was commissioner for militia and became J.P. for Leicestershire again until 1680.

In April 1660, Merry was elected Member of Parliament for Leicestershire in the Convention Parliament. He was commissioner for assessment from August 1660 to 1664, commissioner for oyer and terminer for Lincoln in 1661 and commissioner for corporations for Leicestershire from 1662 to 1663. He was Deputy Lieutenant from 1662 until before 1680. From 1673 to 1674 he was commissioner for assessment again. He was an active member of the Green Ribbon Club and a close friend of Titus Oates, whom he visited in his chambers at Whitehall.

Merry died at Westminster, aged about 76 and was buried lies in the vault of his grandfather at Walthamstow. John Aubrey described him in October 1682 after his death as "a great algebraist and a great Whig" and noted that "it was a pity his papers were lost, for ‘he had done all Euclid in a shorter and clearer manner than ever was yet done, and particularly the tenth book. I have seen it."

== Family ==
Merry married Elizabeth Duncombe, daughter of George Duncombe of Albury, Surrey and had fourteen sons and five daughters. She died on 9 July 1653. In his will, Merry cut off his three surviving children and two grandchildren with a shilling each.

Parliament of England
| Preceded by Sir Arthur Hesilrige; Henry Smith | Member of Parliament for Leicestershire; 1660; With: Matthew Babington | Succeeded by Lord Roos; George Faunt |
