= Lucy Hastings, Countess of Huntingdon =

English poet

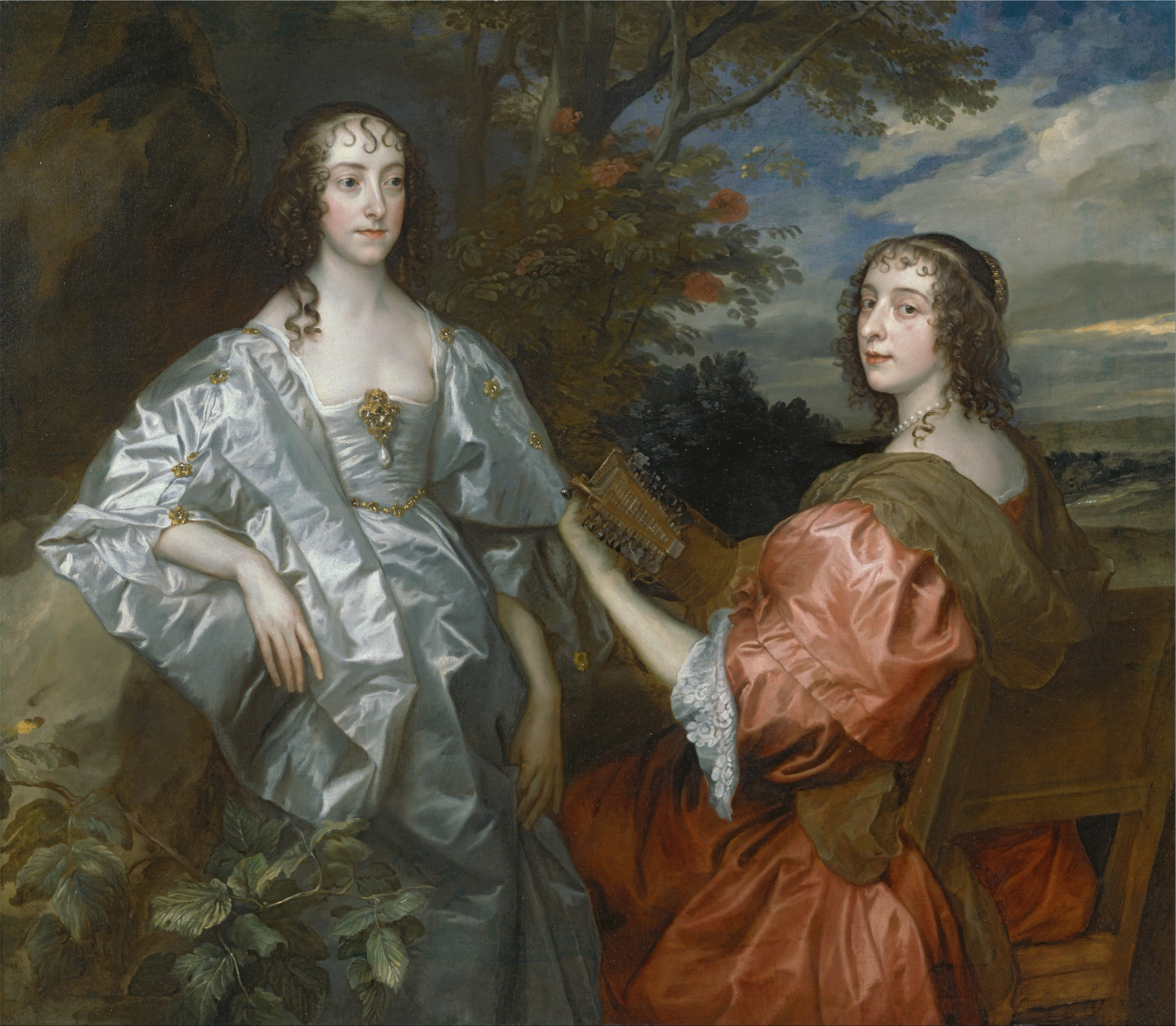
Katherine, Countess of Chesterfield, and Lucy, Countess of Huntingdon, by Anthony van Dyck

Lucy Hastings, Countess of Huntingdon (1613 – 14 November 1679), born Lucy Davies, was a seventeenth-century English poet. Her poems were not published in her lifetime. She had ten children including Elizabeth and the 7th Theophilus Hastings.

== Biography ==
She was the daughter of Lady Eleanor and Sir John Davies (1569–1626) of Englefield, Berkshire, a prominent courtier in the reigns of James I and Charles I and himself a poet; her mother was notorious as the "mad prophetess" Dame Eleanor Davies (1590–1652), sister of the executed Lord Castlehaven. At the young age of ten years, her father arranged a marriage for her with Ferdinando Hastings, son and heir of Henry Hastings, 5th Earl of Huntingdon (1586–1643). (The Earl was aristocratic but poor; Davies was wealthy and ambitious, and had earlier purchased one of the Earl's estates.) Now Lucy Hastings, she was tutored by Bathsua Makin and became fluent in French, Spanish, Latin, Greek, and Hebrew; she translated the Latin poems of Peter du Moulin.

As Countess of Huntingdon, Lucy Hastings' in-laws became involved in a bitter property dispute with her mother in the years 1627–33; troubles due to her religious writings caused the older woman to be imprisoned and lose control of her property to her daughter for a decade.

Though her husband, then the 6th Earl of Huntingdon, was outwardly neutral during the English Civil War, other members of the family, including his brother Henry Hastings, were ardent Royalists. The Hastings family estate, Ashby de la Zouch Castle, was taken by Parliamentary forces in March 1646; the surrender terms demanded that the Castle be demolished, and the family moved to their estate at Donington Park.

Lucy Hastings and her husband had ten children including Lady Elizabeth Langham. Three of the sons predeceased their father; when the family's heir (another Henry Hastings) died of smallpox in June 1649, his passing inspired a collection of elegies titled Lachrymae Musarum ("Tears of the Muses"), edited by Richard Brome and containing verses by John Dryden, Andrew Marvell, Robert Herrick, and others. When the sixth Earl died on 13 February 1656, he was succeeded by Theophilus Hastings, the couple's fourth and sole surviving son.

Lucy Hastings' poetry remained unpublished during her lifetime, a fate common among women writers of her historical period. However, in the contemporary era's renewed interest in rediscovering women writers from past centuries, her work has received increased critical attention.
