= Custos Rotulorum of Leicestershire =

Civic post in Leicestershire, England

This is a list of people who have served as Custos Rotulorum of Leicestershire.

- John Beaumont bef. 1544–1558
- Francis Cave 1558 – aft. 1564
- Henry Hastings, 3rd Earl of Huntingdon bef. 1573–1595
- George Hastings, 4th Earl of Huntingdon 1596–1604
- Sir Henry Beaumont bef. 1605–1607
- Henry Hastings, 5th Earl of Huntingdon bef. 1608–1643
- Ferdinando Hastings, 6th Earl of Huntingdon 1643–1646
- Interregnum
- Henry Hastings, 1st Baron Loughborough 1660–1667
- Basil Feilding, 2nd Earl of Denbigh 1667–1675
- Theophilus Hastings, 7th Earl of Huntingdon 1675–1680
- William Feilding, 3rd Earl of Denbigh 1680–1681
- Theophilus Hastings, 7th Earl of Huntingdon 1681–1689
- Thomas Grey, 2nd Earl of Stamford 1689–1702
- John Manners, 9th Earl of Rutland 1702–1703

For later custodes rotulorum, see Lord Lieutenant of Leicestershire.
