= Lewis baronets of Ledstone (1660) =

Escutcheon of the Lewis baronets of Ledstone

The Lewis baronetcy, of Ledstone in the West Riding of Yorkshire, was created in the Baronetage of England on 15 October 1660 for John Lewis. The title became extinct on his death in 1671, without male heir.

Lewis was an East Indies merchant. He bought the Ledston estate, and Ledston Hall from William Wentworth, 2nd Earl of Strafford in 1653.

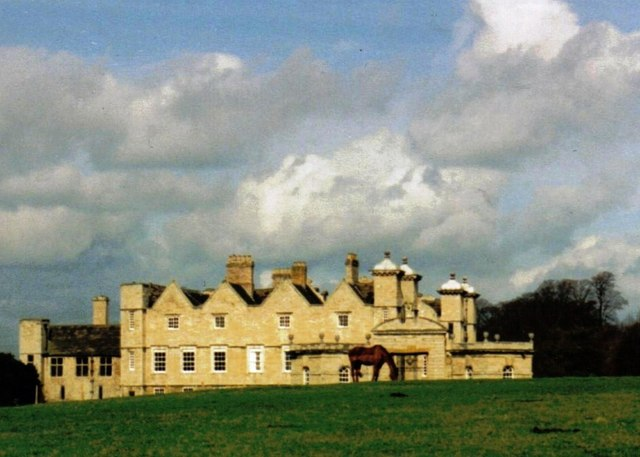
Ledston Hall, 1999 photograph

Lewis married Sarah Foote, daughter of Thomas Foote. Their daughter Elizabeth Lewis (1654–1688) married in 1672 Theophilus Hastings, 7th Earl of Huntingdon, and was mother of Lady Elizabeth Hastings. The other daughter Mary also married in 1672, to Robert Leke, 3rd Earl of Scarsdale. Lewis's wife Sarah remarried in August 1671 to Denzil Onslow of Stoughton.

Sir John and Lady Lewis are buried in the church of All Saints, Ledsham.

== Lewis baronets, of Ledstone (1660) ==
- Sir John Lewis, 1st Baronet (c. 1615–1671)
