= John Manners, 1st Duke of Rutland =

English politician (1638–1711)

His Grace The Duke of Rutland
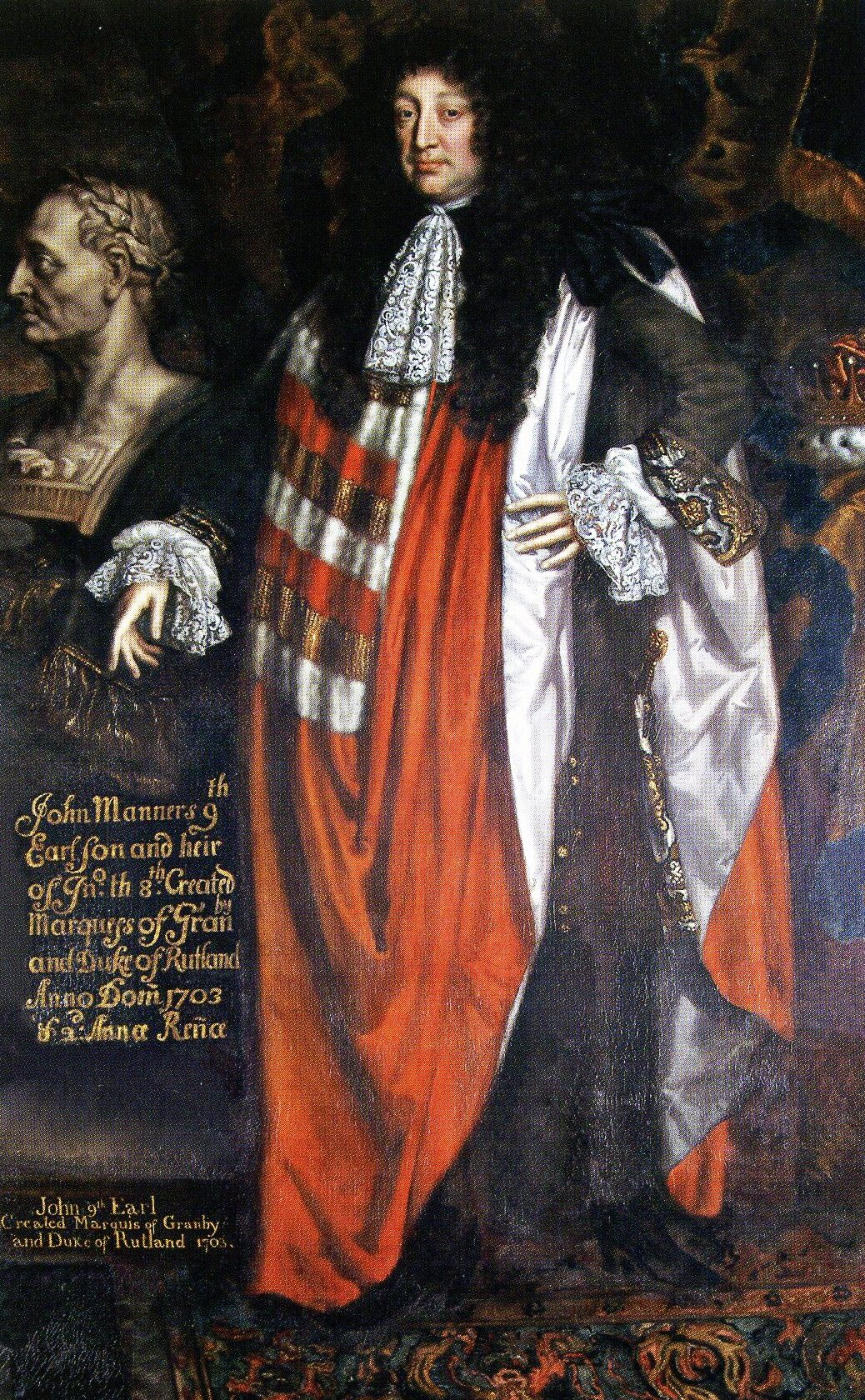
- Portrait by John Closterman, 1679
- Born: 29 May 1638
- Died: 10 January 1711 (aged 72); Belvoir Castle
- Spouses: Lady Anne Pierrepont; Lady Diana Bruce; Catherine Wriothesley Noel
- Issue: John Manners, 2nd Duke of Rutland; Catherine Leveson-Gower, Baroness Gower; Dorothy Noel, Countess of Gainsborough
- Father: John Manners, 8th Earl of Rutland
- Mother: Frances Montagu

John Manners, 1st Duke of Rutland (29 May 1638 – 10 January 1711) was an English Whig politician who represented Leicestershire in the House of Commons of England from 1661 to 1679. His divorce from his first wife caused much comment, partly because it was thought to have political implications.

== Life ==
He was born at Boughton, Northamptonshire, the son of John Manners, 8th Earl of Rutland, and Frances Montagu. His maternal grandparents were Sir Edward Montagu, 1st Baron Montagu of Boughton, and his wife Elizabeth Jeffries. He was styled Lord Roos from 1641 until 1679.

He had six sisters, all of whom married into the nobility. Dorothy became Countess of Shaftesbury; Grace became Viscountess Chaworth; Margaret became countess of Salisbury; Elizabeth became Countess of Anglesey; Anne became Viscountess Howe, and Frances became Countess of Exeter.

He served, rather passively, as Member of Parliament for Leicestershire from 1661 until 1679. Politically he was a Whig, but did not attend court after 1689, preferring the life of a country magnate.

Lord Roos succeeded his father as Lord Lieutenant of Leicestershire in 1677, and proved an effective deputy of the crown. His invitation to Lord Sherard to stand with him for Leicestershire instead of a gentry candidate upset the Leicestershire gentry, and the Commons disallowed Roos' election. He was created Baron Manners of Haddon on 30 April 1679 and sent to the House of Lords instead, but succeeded as Earl of Rutland on 29 September 1679 at the death of his father. He retained his lord lieutenancy in 1681, despite supporting the Exclusion Bill, but was turned out by James II in 1687.

During the events leading to the Glorious Revolution, Rutland received the then Princess Anne at Belvoir Castle on her flight from London late in 1688. Reappointed by William in 1689, he resigned in 1702, to protest government promotion of Tory interests in Leicestershire. He was briefly Custos Rotulorum of Leicestershire thereafter (22 August 1702 – 22 March 1703). On 29 March 1703, his long support of the Whig government was rewarded by his creation as Duke of Rutland and Marquess of Granby. Rutland was reappointed to the lord lieutenancy in 1706, which he retained until his death on 10 January 1711.

== Family ==
Lord Roos Divorce Act 1670
- Act of Parliament
- Parliament of England
- Long title: An Act for John Mannors, called Lord Roos, to marry again.
- Citation: 22 Cha. 2. c. 1 Pr.
- Territorial extent: England and Wales

Dates
- Royal assent: 11 April 1670
- Commencement: 14 February 1670 (Note: Start of session.)

Status: Current legislation

He married firstly his second cousin (they were second cousins and also second cousins once removed), Lady Anne Pierrepont, daughter of Henry Pierrepont, 1st Marquess of Dorchester, and Cecilia Bayning, on 15 July 1658. The failure of their marriage attracted considerable public attention, as divorce was not generally available at the time. He obtained a "separation from bed and board" in 1663 on grounds of her adultery, and private acts of Parliament; in 1667 the Illegitimation of Lady Anne Roos' Children Act 1666 (18 & 19 Cha. 2. c. 8 Pr.) bastardising her issue since 1659, and then Lord Roos Divorce Act 1670 (22 Cha. 2. c. 1 Pr.) granting him permission to remarry. This process required considerable expenditure and trouble. It also caused a series of quarrels with his hot-tempered father-in-law, who on one occasion challenged him to a duel. The divorce proceedings aroused enormous public interest and had some political significance since among the regular attenders in the House of Lords was King Charles II of England himself. By his own account he was only there for the entertainment, saying that he found the debates "as good as a play"; but there was a rumour that the King intended to use the divorce as a precedent for divorcing his own childless Queen, Catherine of Braganza. In the event, the rumour came to nothing. However, the King, who now saw parliamentary debates as a useful guide to the opinions of the ruling class, began to attend the House of Lords regularly. Peers became accustomed to "speaking to the fireside" (i.e. addressing themselves directly to the King, who, to indicate that he was only present as an observer, usually sat by the fire).

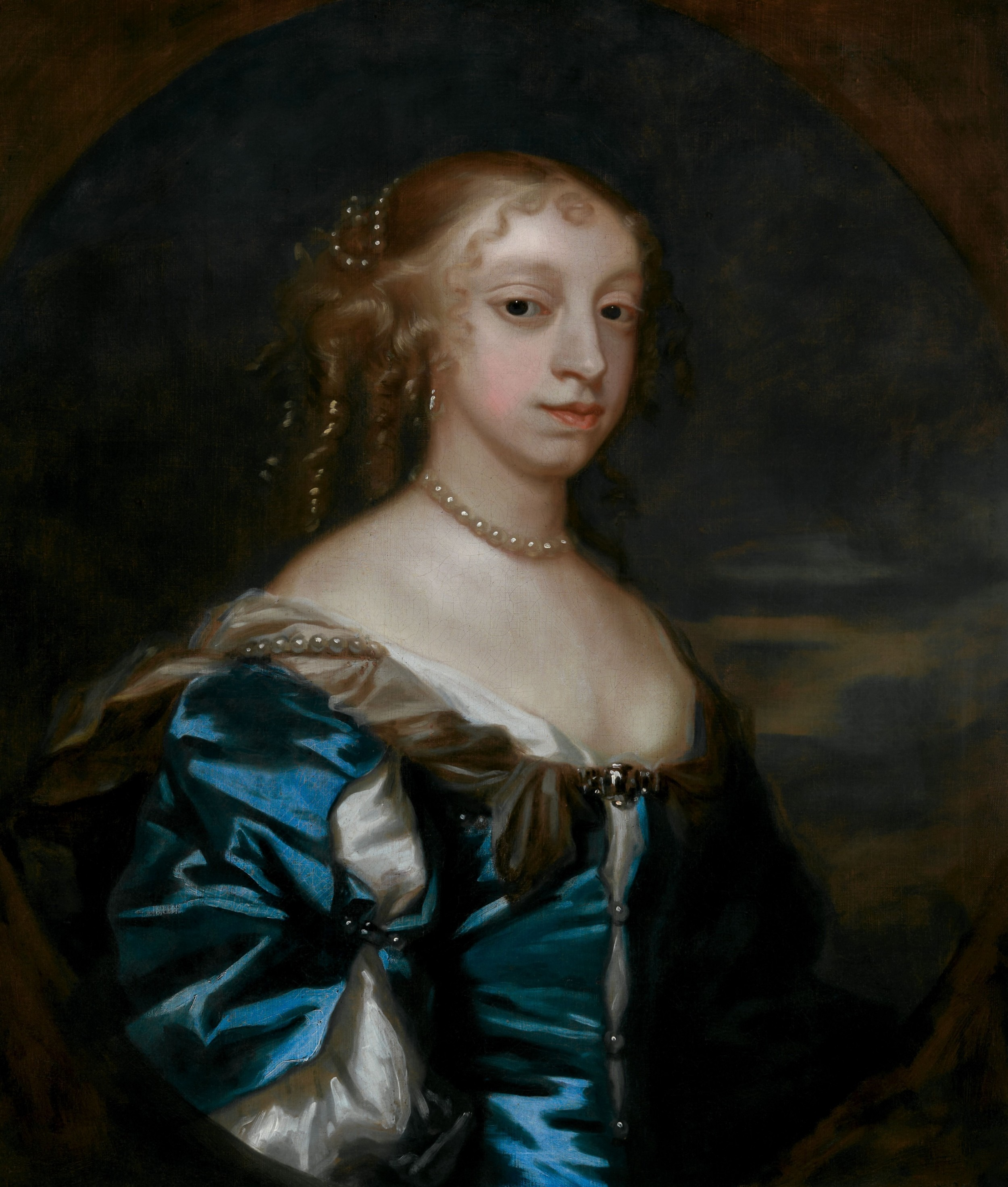
Lady Diana Bruce, Duchess Of Rutland

He married, secondly, Lady Diana Bruce, daughter of Robert Bruce, 2nd Earl of Elgin, and Lady Diana Grey, on 10 November 1671. She died on 15 July 1672 in childbirth.

He married, thirdly, Catherine Wriothesley Noel (died 1733), daughter of Baptist Noel, 3rd Viscount Campden, on 8 January 1673. They had three children:

- John Manners, 2nd Duke of Rutland (1676–1721)
- Lady Catherine Manners (1675–1722), married John Leveson-Gower, 1st Baron Gower, and had issue.
- Lady Dorothy Manners (c. 1690–1734), married Baptist Noel, 3rd Earl of Gainsborough, and had issue.

He died at his home, Belvoir Castle.

== In popular culture ==
- In the 1995 film Rob Roy, Archibald Cunningham (Tim Roth), the primary antagonist, describes himself as an illegitimate child, whose mother worked for a very high class prostitution ring run by the Duke, who is further described as one of the three men who may have been Cunningham's father.

== Bibliography ==
- Archbold, William Arthur Jobson (1893). "Manners, John (1638-1711)" . In Lee, Sidney (ed.). Dictionary of National Biography. Vol. 36. London: Smith, Elder & Co.
- Morrin, Jean. "Manners, John, first duke of Rutland (1638–1711)". Oxford Dictionary of National Biography (online ed.). Oxford University Press. doi:10.1093/ref:odnb/17957. (Subscription, Wikipedia Library access or UK public library membership required.)

Parliament of England
| Preceded by Thomas Merry; Matthew Babington | Member of Parliament for Leicestershire; 1661–1679; With: George Faunt 1661–1679; The Lord Sherard 1679 | Succeeded by The Lord Sherard; Sir John Hartopp, Bt |
Honorary titles
| Preceded by The Earl of Rutland | Lord Lieutenant of Leicestershire; 1677–1687 | Succeeded by The Earl of Huntingdon |
| Preceded by The Earl of Huntingdon | Lord Lieutenant of Leicestershire; 1689–1703 | Succeeded by The Earl of Denbigh |
| Preceded by The Earl of Stamford | Custos Rotulorum of Leicestershire; 1702–1703 | Succeeded by The Earl of Denbigh |
| Preceded by The Earl of Denbigh | Lord Lieutenant of Leicestershire; 1706–1711 | Succeeded by The Earl of Denbigh |
Peerage of England
| Preceded by John Manners | Earl of Rutland; 1679–1711 | Succeeded by John Manners |
| New creation | Baron Manners of Haddon; 1679–1711 | Succeeded by John Manners |
| New creation | Duke of Rutland; 1703–1711 | Succeeded by John Manners |
