= Lady Elizabeth Hastings =

English philanthropist, religious devotee and supporter of women's education

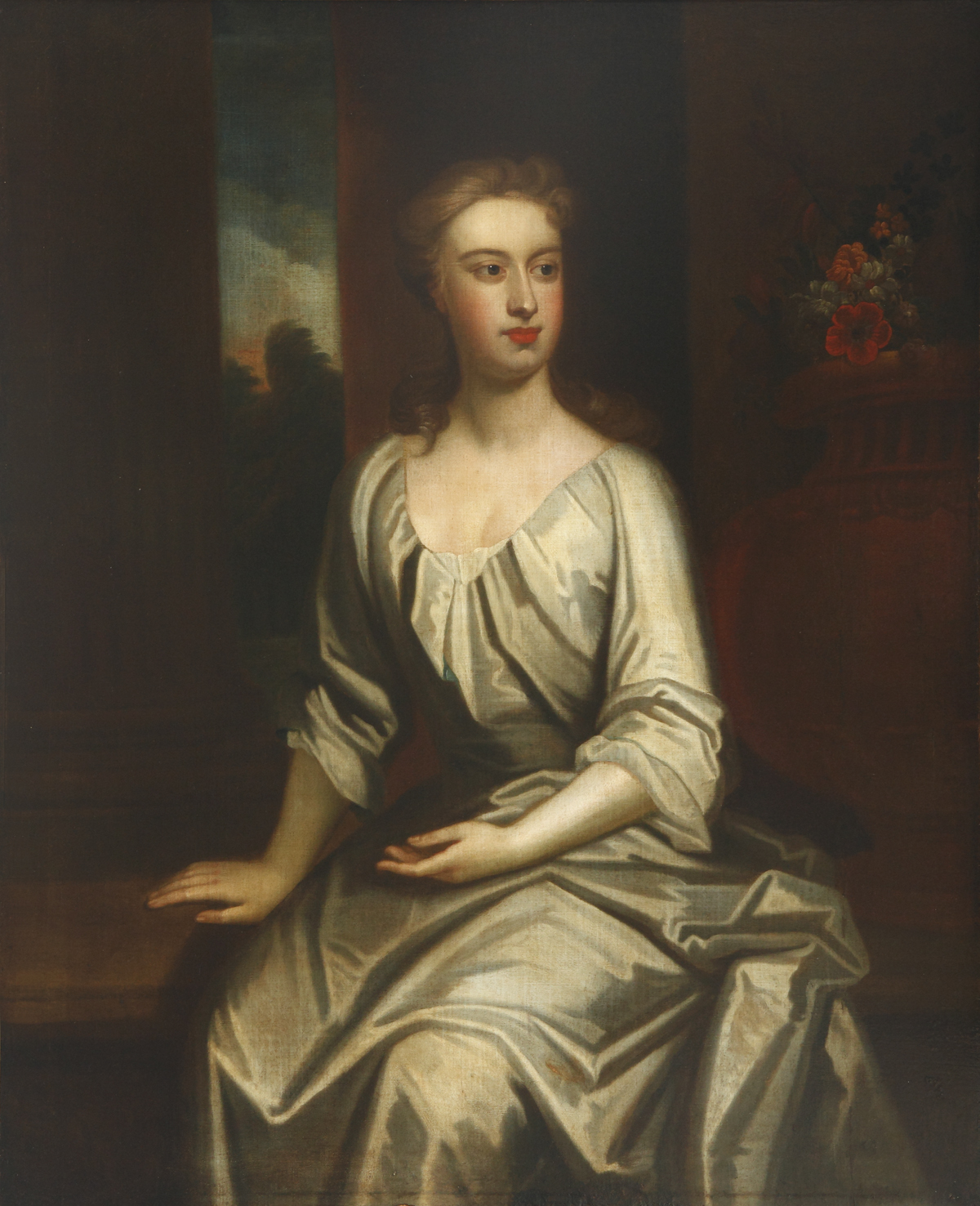
- Lady Elizabeth Hastings by Godfrey Kneller
- Born: 19 April 1682; Charles Street, London
- Died: 21 December 1739 (aged 57); Ledston Hall, Yorkshire
- Father: Theophilus Hastings, 7th Earl of Huntingdon
- Mother: Elizabeth Lewis (died 1688)

Lady Elizabeth Hastings (19 April 1682 – 21 December 1739), also known as Lady Betty, was an English philanthropist, religious devotee and supporter of women's education. She was an intelligent and energetic woman, with a wide circle of connections, including artists, writers and designers, an astute business investor and proponent of innovative farming techniques.

She refused several marriage offers and on her death in 1739, her nephew Francis inherited her estate at Ledston. The rest of her property was used to endow various educational trusts, which still provide funds for scholarships at The Queen's College, Oxford, and the 'Lady Elizabeth Hastings Charities'. In addition, a number of primary schools in West Yorkshire bear her name.

== Biography ==
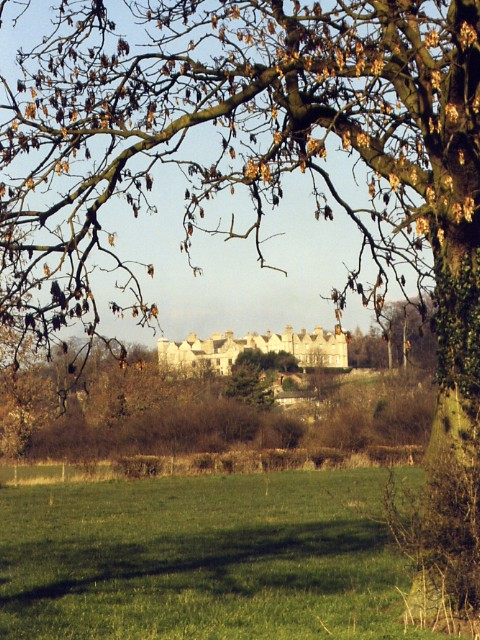
Ledston Hall, Elizabeth's home, now a listed building

Elizabeth was born in April 1682, to Theophilus Hastings, 7th Earl of Huntingdon and his first wife Elizabeth Lewis, co-heiress of Sir John Lewis, a wealthy merchant who owned Ledston Hall, (Note: Also spelled Ledstone Hall) in West Yorkshire. Of nine children from this marriage, only Elizabeth and her brother George, later 8th Earl of Huntingdon, survived into adulthood.

Two years after Elizabeth Lewis died in 1688, Huntingdon married Mary Fowler, the wealthy widow of Thomas Needham, 6th Viscount Kilmorey. They had two sons and four daughters: Ann (1691–1755), Catherine (1692–1739), Frances (1693–1750), Theophilus, 9th Earl of Huntingdon (1696–1746), Margaret (1699–1768) and Ferdinando (1699–1726).

Her father quarrelled with George over the Ledston estate, leading to a legal dispute only resolved in 1703, two years after his death in May 1701. Once this was settled, Elizabeth received Ledston Hall and £3,000 per year; when George died suddenly in February 1705, she also inherited his share of their grandfather's estate. An attractive, young and extremely wealthy lady of reputed wit and warmth, she received several marriage proposals but her correspondence indicates remaining single was a conscious choice.

George's titles passed to his half-brother Theophilus; Elizabeth paid for his memorial in St James' Church, Piccadilly, which can still be found in the east gallery, south side. He left an illegitimate son named Henry, who was brought up by Elizabeth and is thought to be the Henry Hastings who was treasurer of the Society for the Propagation of Christian Knowledge from 1745 to 1747.

She supervised the education of her siblings and her four half-sisters lived at Ledston Park for many years. In 1726, she arranged Theophilus's marriage to Selina Hastings, a key figure in the early Methodist movement and founder of the evangelical sect known as the Countess of Huntingdon's Connexion.

== Career ==
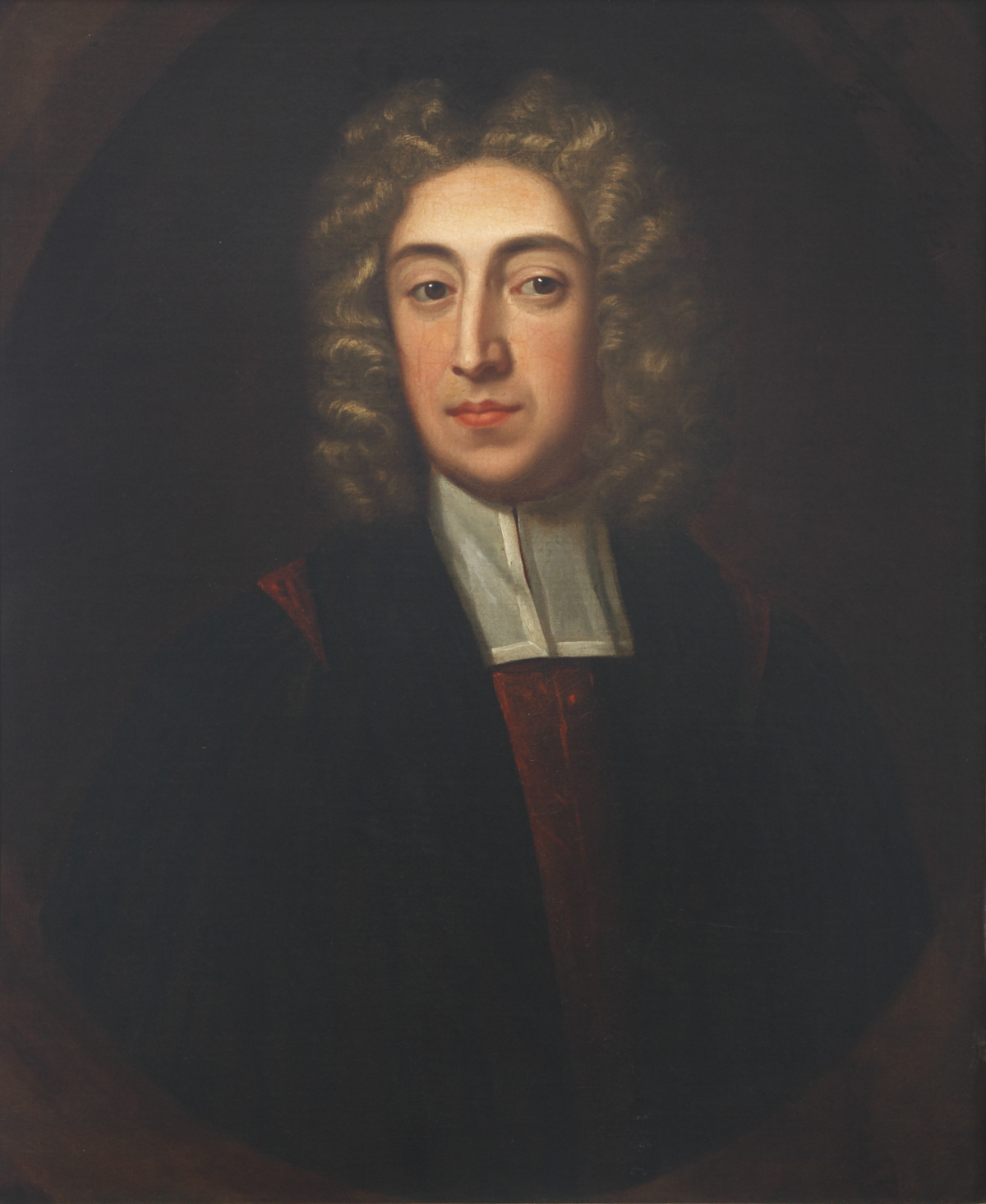
Joseph Smith, Provost of The Queen's College, Oxford

Her father was closely associated with James II, who lost many supporters when his religious policies seemed to go beyond tolerance for Catholicism and become an assault on the Church of England. As one of the few to support these policies until the very end, Huntingdon's reputation suffered from being seen as an active persecutor of his own church. Late in life, Elizabeth recorded memories of attending her mother's deathbed in London in December 1688, with widespread panic and rioting in the streets outside over fears of a Catholic invasion.

Exclusion from political life meant women like Elizabeth often found an outlet in religion and education, viewed as fitting their 'role' as nurturers and providers of moral guidance. She adopted her father's High Church, Tory beliefs, although she was not a supporter of the exiled Stuarts. Many of her clerical contacts were Nonjurors, those who refused to swear allegiance to William III after the 1688 Glorious Revolution; the vast majority simply felt bound by their oath to James and the issue went away when he died in 1701.

They included Joseph Smith, who became Provost of The Queen's College, Oxford and later persuaded her to fund scholarships at the college. (Note: She left the manor of Wheldale to Queen's College, to support five poor scholars from schools in the north of England. The Trust still supports these, now open to students from thirty schools, with a focus on Cumberland and Westmorland, as well as post-graduates from the universities of Leeds, Sheffield, Hull, York, and Bradford.) Smith was part of a network that combined Tory, High Church beliefs with support for the post-1688 settlement, and was well-known for converting Catholic members of the English aristocracy to Anglicanism. In 1715, he advised Elizabeth to take the Oath of Abjuration, denying the right of James Francis Edward Stuart to the throne. He also provided guidance when she became interested in Methodism; originally a reformist movement within the Church of England, its later conflation with Jacobitism derived from its rejection of existing structures, rather than support for the Stuarts. Her friend and distant relative Catherine Stanhope married William Wogan, an evangelical on close terms with Methodist leaders John Wesley and George Whitefield. When Catherine died in 1726, her seven year old daughter went to live at Ledston Hall.

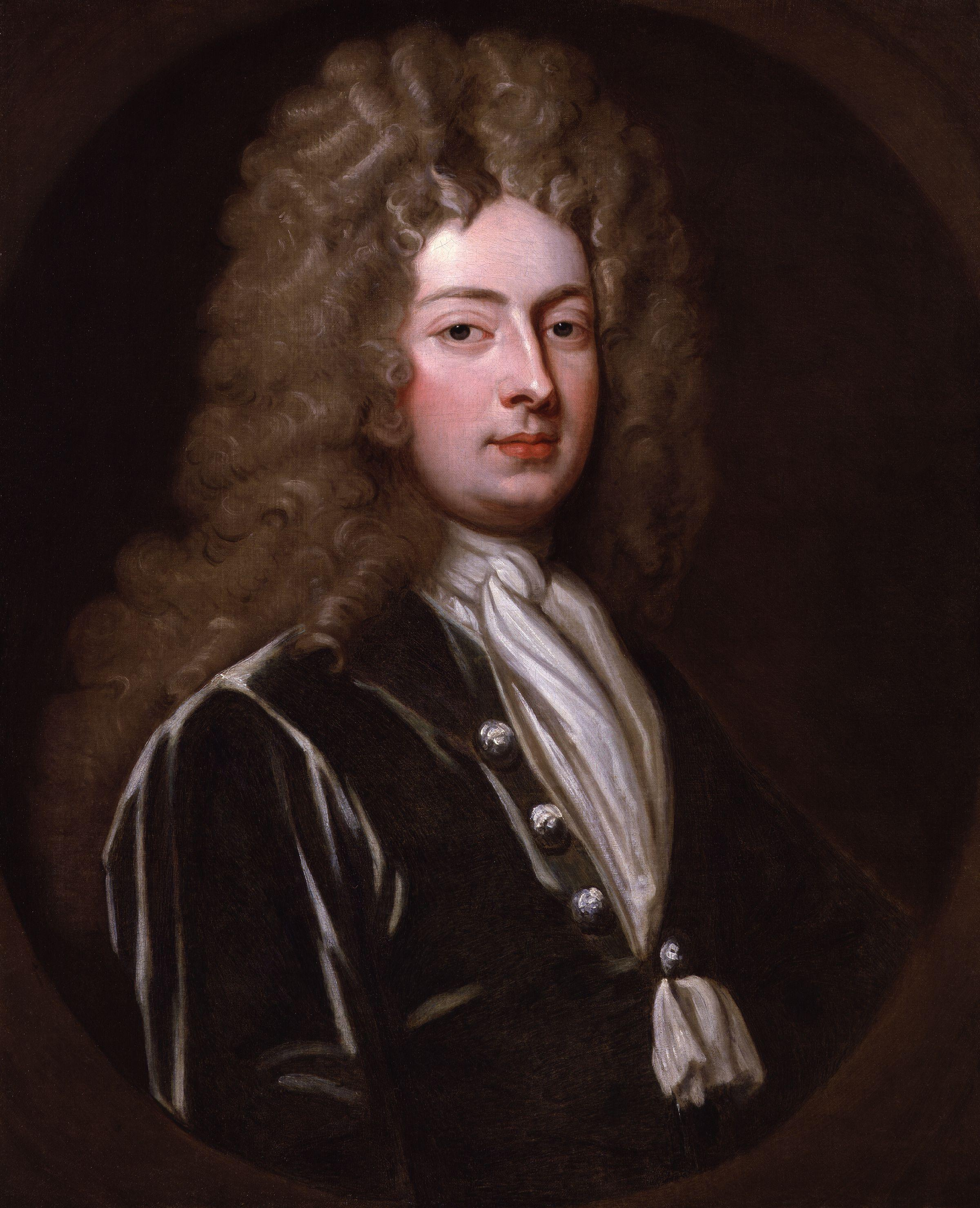
Elizabeth's distant relative, poet and playwright William Congreve

Although women were not officially permitted to become members, she was closely connected to the Society for the Propagation of Christian Knowledge; this brought her into contact with wealthy philanthropist and Non-Juror Robert Nelson, whose works were apparently read as homilies at Ledston. Together with Lady Catherine Jones, in 1709 she funded a girls' school in Chelsea, supported by the Society. It is thought to be the first in England that had an all-women Board of Governors. The school and its curriculum was run by Mary Astell, an educationalist sometimes called the first English feminist. Astell was the daughter of a wealthy, upper-class merchant, who shared Elizabeth's Non-Juror connections and political beliefs. She is now best known for her essay 'Some reflections on marriage', in particular her question "If all Men are born free, how is it that all Women are born Slaves?" Elizabeth was distantly related to poet and playwright William Congreve; he referenced her in the Tatler journal, as did Richard Steele, who wrote "...to know her is an immediate check to loose behaviour, and to love her a liberal education."

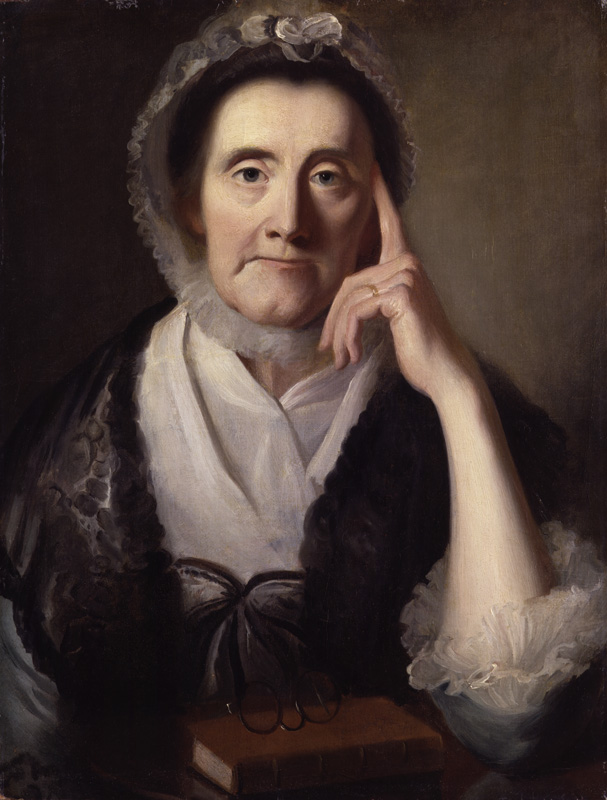
Elizabeth's sister-in-law and Methodist reformer, Selina, Countess of Huntingdon

Unlike her more combative sister-in-law Selina, she was known for her warm nature and as a generous host, despite being personally abstemious. The gardens at Ledston were laid out by Charles Bridgeman, who designed those at St James's and Hyde Parks; she was considered an innovative landlord, encouraging the use of irrigation techniques and fertilisers by her tenants. She owned one of the first personal accounts with Hoare's Bank, which was used for her business dealings, including investments in the early stock market. This was designed to produce cash, since landed wealth was relatively illiquid, and allowed her far greater flexibility in terms of donations. Several primary schools in West Yorkshire still bear her name, including Ledston, Collingham, and Thorp Arch. In 1721, she made a significant donation towards construction of Holy Trinity Church, Leeds, as well as contributing ideas to its design.

Early in 1738, she was diagnosed with breast cancer and underwent a mastectomy, performed without anaesthetic, but her health continued to decline. Needing to survive another 12 months to comply with the laws on establishing a trust, she died at the end of 1739, one year and one week later. She was buried in All Saints Ledsham, a church dating back to the 7th century. Her tomb was designed by Peter Scheemakers.

Ledston and its library were left to her nephew Francis, much to the disappointment of Lady Selina, whose own charitable works were rapidly exceeding her resources. Scholarships at Queen's College for northern students were funded by her Wheldale estate, site of Wheldale Colliery from 1868 to 1988. The remainder established the 'Lady Elizabeth Hastings Charities', with the initial sum of £40 a year, focusing on education, primarily in the North of England; they still exist and in the decade since 2008, awarded grants totalling more than £2.2 million.

== Sources ==
- Astell, Mary (1700). Some reflections upon marriage occasion'd by the Duke & Dutchess of Mazarine's case, which is also considered. John Nutt.
- Bell, Henry Nugent (1821). The Huntingdon Peerage. Baldwin, Cradock and Joy.
- Donawerth, Jane (2002). Rhetorical Theory by Women Before 1900: An Anthology. Rowman & Littlefield. ISBN 978-0742517165.
- Guerrini, Anita (2004). "Hastings, Lady Elizabeth". Oxford Dictionary of National Biography (Online ed.). Oxford University Press. doi:10.1093/ref:odnb/12564. (Subscription, Wikipedia Library access or UK public library membership required.)
- Hill, Bridget (2001). Women Alone Spinsters in England 1660–1850. Yale University Press. ISBN 0300088205.
- Journals of the House of Commons, Volume 11; 1693-1697. House of Commons. 1803.
- Laurence, Anne (2010). "Lady Betty Hastings (1682–1739): godly patron" (PDF). Women's History Review. 19 (2): 201–213. doi:10.1080/09612021003633911. S2CID 145687985.
- Linstrum, Derek (1978). West Yorkshire Architects and Architecture. Lund Humphries Publishers Ltd. ISBN 978-0853314103.
- Livingstone, Neil (1998). Yun, Lee Too (ed.). Pedagogy and Power: Rhetorics of Classical Learning. CUP. ISBN 978-0521594356.
- Miller, John (1978). James II; A study in kingship. Menthuen. ISBN 978-0413652904.
- Monod, Paul Kleber (1993). Jacobitism and the English People, 1688–1788. Cambridge University Press. ISBN 978-0521447935.
- Overton, J. H. (1902). The Nonjurors: Their Lives, Principles, and Writings (2018 ed.). Wentworth Press. ISBN 978-0530237336.
- Schlenther, Boyd Stanley (2008). "Hastings [née Shirley], Selina, countess of Huntingdon (1707-1791)". Oxford Dictionary of National Biography (Online ed.). Oxford University Press. doi:10.1093/ref:odnb/12582. (Subscription, Wikipedia Library access or UK public library membership required.)
- Scott, Beatrice (1983). "Lady Elizabeth Hastings". The Yorkshire Archaeological Journal. 55.
- Stephens, John Calhoun (1982). The Guardian. University Press of Kentucky. ISBN 978-0813114224.
- Tyson, John; Schlenther, Boyd (2006). In the Midst of Early Methodism: Lady Huntingdon and Her Correspondence. Scarecrow Press. ISBN 978-0810857933.
- Urbanus, Sylvanus (1814). Gentleman's Magazine and Historical Chronicle; Volume LXXXIV. Nichols, Son & Bentley.
