= Catherine Manners, Duchess of Rutland =

Her Grace The Duchess of Rutland
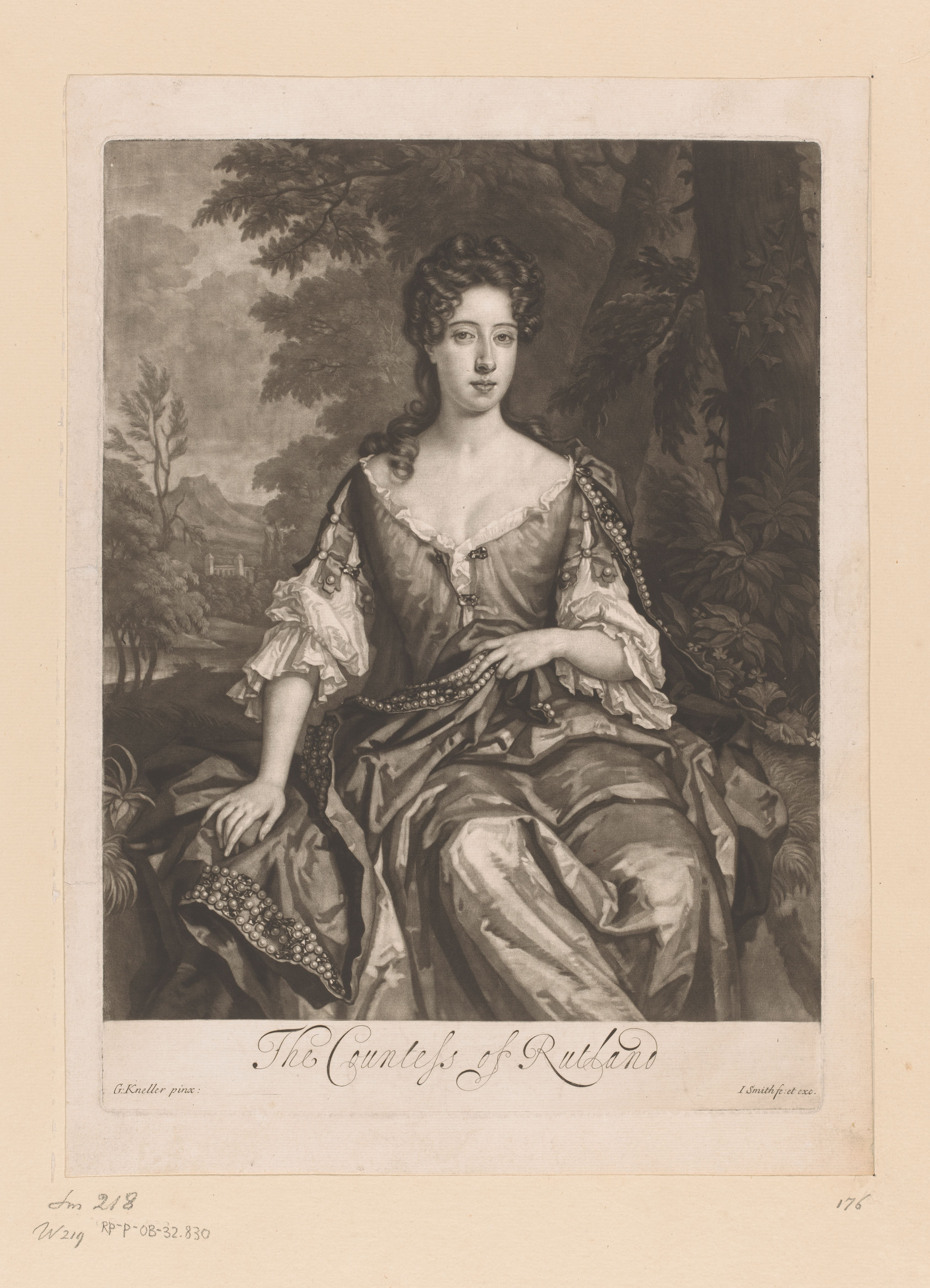
- Manners portrait in 1689

Personal details
- Born: Catherine Manners; 10 August 1657
- Died: 24 January 1733 (aged 75)
- Spouse: John Manners, 1st Duke of Rutland (m. 1673)
- Children: John Manners, 2nd Duke of Rutland; Lady Catherine Manners; Lady Dorothy Manners
- Parent(s): Baptist Noel, 3rd Viscount Campden (father); Elizabeth Noel, Viscountess Campden (mother)

Catherine Manners, Duchess of Rutland (10 August 1657 – 24 January 1733), formerly Catherine Wriothesley Noel, was an English noblewoman. She was the third wife of John Manners, 1st Duke of Rutland, and the mother of the second duke. She was known as Lady Roos between 1673 and 1679, and the Countess of Rutland between 1679 and 1703.

== Life ==
Catherine was the daughter of Baptist Noel, 3rd Viscount Campden, and his wife, the former Lady Elizabeth Bertie. She married the Duke of Rutland on 8 January 1673, when he was still known as Lord Roos, the heir to John Manners, 8th Earl of Rutland; she was nearly twenty years his junior. Roos had divorced his first wife, Lady Anne Pierrepont, in an unprecedented action, the first legal divorce to take place since the English Reformation of the 16th century. His second wife, Lady Diana Bruce, died in childbirth in 1672, after less than a year of marriage. He inherited his father's earldom in 1679 and was raised to a dukedom in 1703, making Catherine the first to hold the title of Duchess of Rutland.

The duke and duchess had three children:

- John Manners, 2nd Duke of Rutland (1676–1721)
- Lady Catherine Manners (1675–1722), who married John Leveson-Gower, 1st Baron Gower, and had children
- Lady Dorothy Manners (c. 1690–1734), who married Baptist Noel, 3rd Earl of Gainsborough, and had children

The duchess's father and mother died within a year of one another, in 1682 and 1683 respectively. The duke died in 1711, at the family seat, Belvoir Castle. His widow subsequently moved to Lindsey House in Chelsea, which she rented from her relations, the earls of Lindsey; she remained there until her own death.

Catherine's portrait was painted by Sir Godfrey Kneller.
