= Anne Manners, Lady Roos =

Anne Manners, Lady Roos (9 March 1631 – 1688), formerly Lady Anne Pierrepont, was the first wife of John Manners, 1st Duke of Rutland. Their marital break-up caused a sensation and their divorce, in 1670, on the grounds of Lady Roos's adultery, was the first to be granted in England since the Reformation.

== Biography ==
Anne was the daughter of Henry Pierrepont, 1st Marquess of Dorchester, and Cecilia Bayning, and was thus distantly related to Manners (whose grandmother was a Pierrepont), then known as Lord Roos and heir to the earldom of Rutland, whom she married on 15 July 1658. Their first child was a daughter, who died in early infancy. While her husband was abroad, Lady Roos went on a trip to London and came back pregnant. She is alleged to have told her husband that, regardless of who had fathered the child, if it was a boy it would one day be Earl of Rutland. The boy, when he was born, was named "Ignotus" at his baptism and sent to a foster home by Lord Roos. Lady Roos instead gave him the name "John", after the future duke, who introduced a parliamentary bill to have the child illegitimised. By the time the bill went through, in 1667, she had given birth to a second son, whom she named Charles. A third son, named Henry, was also designated a bastard.

== Divorce ==
Illegitimation of Lady Anne Roos' Children Act 1666
- Act of Parliament
- Parliament of England
- Long title: An Act for the Illegitimation of the Children of the Lady Anne Roos.
- Citation: 18 & 19 Cha. 2. c. 8 Pr.
- Territorial extent: England and Wales

Dates
- Royal assent: 8 February 1667
- Commencement: 21 September 1666 (Note: Start of session.)

Status: Current legislation

Lord Roos obtained a "separation from bed and board" from his wife in the ecclesiastical courts in 1666 and introduced a bill into the House of Lords to pronounce her children illegitimate, on grounds of her adultery. A private act of Parliament in 1667, the Illegitimation of Lady Anne Roos' Children Act 1666 (18 & 19 Cha. 2. c. 8 Pr.), illegitimised any children she had had since 1659 and in 1670 another act of Parliament, Lord Roos Divorce Act 1670 (22 Cha. 2. c. 1 Pr.), gave him permission to remarry. Although an MP, Roos had taken little interest in Parliamentary proceedings until he began to seek support for his divorce. At some time following the divorce, Lady Roos began using the title Lady Anne Vaughan.

King Charles II of England was a regular attendee in the House of Lords, and a rumour arose that the King intended to use the divorce as a precedent for divorcing his own queen, Catherine of Braganza, who had borne no surviving children. Anne's father unsuccessfully challenged his son-in-law, Roos, to a duel. Anne herself had Ignoto returned to her and renamed him. She then had another son by an anonymous father, and the two boys were known as John and Charles Manners. She is believed to have married someone with the surname Vaughan, possibly the same man who was injured in a duel with Philip Herbert, 7th Earl of Pembroke, in the 1670s.

Roos married Lady Diana Bruce in 1671, and went on to have legitimate children by his third wife, Catherine Wriothesley Noel.
