= Lord Lieutenant of Leicestershire =

Civil post in Leicestershire, England

This is a list of people who have served as Lord Lieutenant of Leicestershire. Since 1703, all Lord Lieutenants have also been Custos Rotulorum of Leicestershire.

== Lord Lieutenants ==
- Henry Grey, 3rd Marquess of Dorset 1549–1551
- Francis Hastings, 2nd Earl of Huntingdon 1551–1552
- Henry Grey, 1st Duke of Suffolk 1552–1554
- Francis Hastings, 2nd Earl of Huntingdon 1554 – 20 June 1561 jointly with
- Henry Hastings, 3rd Earl of Huntingdon 1559 – 14 December 1595
- George Hastings, 4th Earl of Huntingdon 2 October 1596 – 30 December 1604
- vacant
- Henry Hastings, 5th Earl of Huntingdon 16 May 1607 – 1642 jointly with
- Ferdinando Hastings, 6th Earl of Huntingdon 27 December 1638 – 1642
- Henry Grey, 1st Earl of Stamford 1642–? (Parliamentary)
- Interregnum
- Henry Hastings, 1st Baron Loughborough 14 January 1661 – 10 January 1667
- John Manners, 8th Earl of Rutland 14 February 1667 – 7 July 1677
- John Manners, 9th Earl of Rutland 7 July 1677 – 11 August 1687
- Theophilus Hastings, 7th Earl of Huntingdon 11 August 1687 – 6 April 1689
- John Manners, 9th Earl of Rutland 6 April 1689 – 24 March 1703
- Basil Feilding, 4th Earl of Denbigh 24 March 1703 – 1 July 1706
- John Manners, 1st Duke of Rutland 1 July 1706 – 10 January 1711
- Basil Feilding, 4th Earl of Denbigh 8 September 1711 – 3 December 1714
- John Manners, 2nd Duke of Rutland 3 December 1714 – 22 February 1721
- John Manners, 3rd Duke of Rutland 26 April 1721 – 29 May 1779
- Charles Manners, 4th Duke of Rutland 16 July 1779 – 24 October 1787
- Henry Somerset, 5th Duke of Beaufort 14 December 1787 – 21 October 1799
- John Manners, 5th Duke of Rutland 21 October 1799 – 20 January 1857
- Charles Manners, 6th Duke of Rutland 13 February 1857 – 3 March 1888
- Richard William Penn Curzon-Howe, 3rd Earl Howe 19 June 1888 – 25 September 1900
- Henry Manners, 8th Duke of Rutland 7 November 1900 – 8 May 1925
- Arthur Grey Hazlerigg, 1st Baron Hazlerigg 27 July 1925 – 25 May 1949
- Robert Godfrey Wolseley Bewicke-Copley, 5th Baron Cromwell 2 August 1949 – 21 October 1966
- Col. Sir Robert Andrew St George Martin 5 April 1966 – 24 April 1989
- Sir Timothy Gerald Martin Brooks 24 April 1989 – 24 February 2003
- Jennifer Gretton, Baroness Gretton 24 February 2003 – 14 June 2018
- Mike Kapur 14 June 2018 – present

== Deputy Lieutenants ==
Active List as of April 2016

- Ramanbahai C Barber - June, 2013
- Gautam Govindlal Bodiwala 2001
- Richard L Brucciani 1999
- Professor Sir Robert Burgess 2010
- Hazel Byford, Baroness Byford 2010
- Robert Bruce Collins 2006
- Colonel Raeburn Murray Longair Colville 1997
- Rosemary Jean N Conley 1999
- Gerrard Amaury A March Phillips de Lisle 1997
- Richard Anthony Spencer Everard 1997
- Andrew James Granger 2008
- Brigadier William James Hurrell 2008
- Col Richard Sells Hurwood 2006
- Freda Hussain 2006
- David John Knowles 1999
- Sir Michael Latham
- Dr Angela Isabel Agnes Lennox 2001
- Elizabeth Jane Martin - June, 2013
- Colonel Robert C J Martin 2010
- Ian Malcolm McAlpine 2001
- Suleman Nagdi 2008
- Hugh Michael Pearson 2008
- Professor Sir Nilesh J Samani 2010
- Resham Singh Sandhu 2006
- Wendi Kathleen Stevens 2008
- Bridget Ellen Towle - June, 2013
- Peter John Wheeler 2001
- David William Wilson 2008
- David John Wyrko Esq 2010
- Jonathan Agnew 2015
- Dave Andrews 2015
- Sally Bowie 2015
- Mike Kapur 2015
- David Lindley 2015
- Riaz Ravat 2015
- Elisabeth Turnbull 2015
- Professor David Wilson 2015

Added 2017:

- Richard Allan Halford Brooks 2017
- Richard Charles Griffin Clowes 2017
- Mehmooda Duke 2017
- Priyesh Patel 2017
- Professor Surinder Mohan Sharma 2017
- Lieutenant Colonel David Richard James Young 2018

== Previous Deputy Lieutenants ==
- Ernest Clive Atkins
- John Cridlan Barrett
- Edwyn Burnaby
- Thomas Cave
- John Coke
- Edwin de Lisle
- John de Lisle
- Sir William Farrell-Skeffington
- Washington Shirley, 8th Earl Ferrers
- Washington Shirley, 9th Earl Ferrers
- Charles Freer, 1862
- John Frewen-Turner
- John Gretton, 3rd Baron Gretton
- John Dove Harris
- Sir Thomas Kennedy
- Sir Maurice Levy, 1st Baronet
- Sir Edward Packe
- Eben William Robertson
- George Murray Smith the Younger
- Samuel Francis Stone, March 1901
- Robert Tilney
