= Charles Freer (cricketer) =

English cricketer and British Army officer

Personal information
- Full name: Charles Thomas Freer
- Born: 18 March 1809; Leicester, Leicestershire, England
- Died: 12 May 1882 (aged 73); Buxton, Derbyshire, England
- Batting: Right-handed

Domestic team information
- Years: Team
- 1842–1846: Marylebone Cricket Club

Career statistics
Competition	First-class
Matches	8
Runs scored	66
Batting average	4.71
100s/50s	–/–
Top score	27
Catches/stumpings	4/–
- Source: Cricinfo, 13 August 2021

Charles Thomas Freer DL JP (18 March 1809 – 12 May 1882) was an English first-class cricketer and British Army officer.

The son of Thomas Freer, he was born at Leicester in March 1809. He was commissioned into the 65th Foot in November 1827, when he purchased the rank of ensign. years later he purchased the rank of lieutenant in October 1830, prior to retiring from service in February 1832. Five years later he was recommissioned into the Leicestershire Yeomanry. A keen cricketer, Freer played minor matches for Leicestershire and played first-class cricket for the Marylebone Cricket Club between 1842 and 1846, making eight appearances, predominantly against the university sides of Cambridge and Oxford, as well as regional sides in the form of the North and the West. He struggled in first-class cricket, scoring 66 runs at an average of just 4.71.

Freer remained serving in the Leicestershire Yeomanry into the 1840s and was promoted to captain in June 1846. Freer was nominated to be High Sheriff of Leicestershire for 1857 and was unsuccessful, but was successfully nominated again the following year; he later served as a deputy lieutenant for Leicestershire in 1862. He was promoted to major in the Leicestershire Yeomanry in May 1863, later retiring from active service some thirteen years later in June 1876. Freer was additionally a justice of the peace for Leicestershire. His business interests included his directorship of the Pare's Leicestershire Banking Company, from which he retired in 1880. Freer was the treasurer of the Leicester Royal Infirmary until his death May 1882 at Buxton, Derbyshire.
