= Elizabeth Langham =

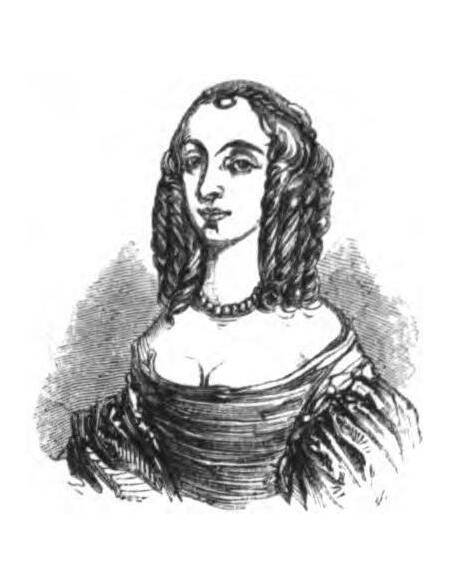
- Born: Elizabeth Hastings; 19 February 1635; Prob. Donington Hall, Leicestershire, England
- Died: 18 March 1664 (aged 29); Cottesbrooke, Northamptonshire, England
- Occupation: gentlewoman
- Known for: godly life

Elizabeth Langham born Lady Elizabeth Hastings (19 February 1635 – 18 March 1664) was an English noblewoman who was seen as an example of godly life. She had a talent for languages.

== Life ==
Langham was born on 19 February 1635, probably at the family seat of Donington Hall. She was one of ten children and four daughters of Ferdinando Hastings, 6th Earl of Huntingdon and his wife, the poet, Lucy Hastings, Countess of Huntingdon.

She was known for her devotion to her education and her religious duties. The sisters were taught by their well educated mother, but it was Elizabeth who was the keenest student.

On 18 November 1662, she became the second of Sir James Langham, 2nd Baronet's four wives. Her husband had just been the member of parliament for Northampton. She came with a dowry of £10,000. They lived at houses at Cottesbrooke and Crosby Place in London which belonged to her father-in-law. She became the step mother of Mary Langham who was eleven years old. Elizabeth became her tutor in matters religious.

== Death and legacy ==
Langham died in Cottesbrooke in 1664 after a marriage of less than two years. She was pregnant and she died of smallpox. She was said to be recognised for her goodness towards the poor, her servants, her family and the household. Her husband's brother, William, wrote her a eulogy which included the lines "That skill in Scripture, and in Tongues she got/ Made her a living Bible Polyglot". Her step-daughter, Mary, inherited her religious devotion and she would in time marry Henry Booth, first earl of Warrington.

In 1683 Samuel Clarke published The Lives of Sundry Eminent Persons in this Later Age which included Langham. Clarke described Langham as the "epitome of a godly gentlewoman". She had been included in more than five other books of biographies of women.
