= Ledston =

Village and civil parish in West Yorkshire, England

Coordinates: 53°45′07″N 1°20′37″W

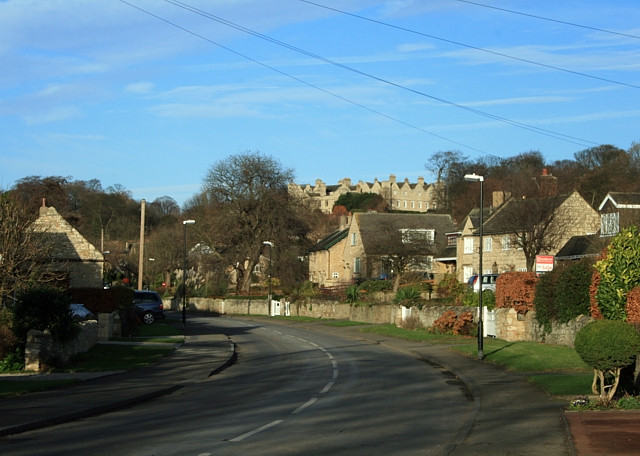
- Main Street, Ledston

- Location within West Yorkshire
- Population: 394 (2011 census)
- Metropolitan borough: City of Leeds
- Metropolitan county: West Yorkshire
- Region: Yorkshire and the Humber
- Country: England
- Sovereign state: United Kingdom
- Post town: Castleford
- Postcode district: WF10
- Dialling code: 01977
- Police: West Yorkshire
- Fire: West Yorkshire
- Ambulance: Yorkshire

Ledston (historically also spelt Ledstone) is a village in the Leeds metropolitan borough, in the county of West Yorkshire, England. It is 3 miles (5 km) north of Castleford and 10 miles (16 km) east of Leeds. The parish had a population of 400 in 2001, which decreased slightly to 394 at the 2011 census.

== History ==
Ledston is first mentioned in 1086, and on through the Middle Ages, in forms like Ledestun(e), Ledestona. The name seems to refer to Leeds (or the Old English precursor of this name, Loidis, which denoted a region rather than a town), meaning the tūn ('settlement, estate') belonging to Leeds.

Mary Pannal of Ledston was executed in 1603 as an accused witch.

Ledston was historically a township in the ancient parish of Ledsham in the wapentake of Barkston Ash in the West Riding of Yorkshire. The township became a separate civil parish in 1866. In 1974 Ledston was transferred to the City of Leeds in the new county of West Yorkshire. On 1 April 2023 the civil parish was abolished.

== Ledston Hall ==
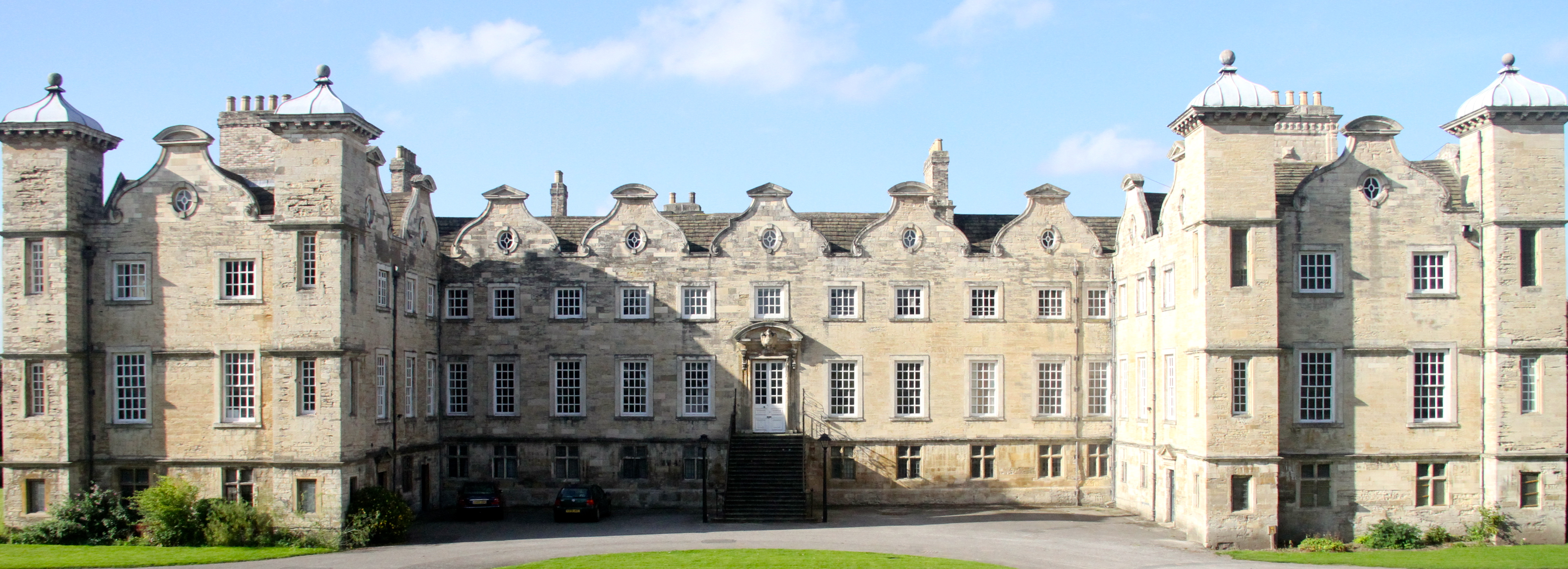
Ledston Hall

Ledston or Ledstone Hall was the home of Lady Elizabeth Hastings, daughter of the 7th Earl of Huntingdon, known as "Lady Betty". The hall was originally a grange and chapel built by the monks of Pontefract Priory. It is a grade I listed building, and several associated buildings and garden features are also listed. The Wheler Trust -- founded in 1992 when the last descendent of the hall, Granville Wheler, died -- manages the house. Ledston Hall featured in the television show Most Haunted:Live on 27 October 2007, but was called "Wheler Priory" for security reasons at the time (Wheler being the surname of the last family owning the hall).

Ledston is also home to the Ledston Equine Centre located in the stables of Ledston Hall.

Ledston lies to the east of the A656 road, and there was a railway station named after the village on the Castleford to Garforth line, though this station was actually adjacent to Allerton Bywater Colliery. The village also had a colliery named after it, Ledston Luck, which was connected to the railway via a narrow gauge railway line up to Peckfield Colliery in Micklefield. The colliery, like the railway station, was some distance away from the village from which it took its name, being actually only 0.6 miles (1 km) east of Kippax. Ledston Luck Colliery closed in 1986 and the site is now a local nature reserve.

== White Horse Inn ==
The White Horse Inn is a 15th-century public house. It was 2019 regional winner of North East Pubs in Bloom, and supports various local activities such as the Ledston in Bloom, a village scarecrow competition. and the Ledston Christmas light switch on.

== See also ==
- Listed buildings in Ledston
