= IMechE Railway Challenge =

Train competition for students

Railway Challenge
- Status: active
- Genre: competition
- Frequency: Annually
- Venue: Stapleford Miniature Railway, Stapleford Park, Leicestershire
- Coordinates: 52.757°N 0.791°W
- Country: United Kingdom
- Inaugurated: 2012
- Previous event: 2025
- Next event: 2026
- Major events: Auto-stop (2019‒); Ride Comfort (EN 12299:2009); Energy Storage; Traction; Maintainability; Reliability; Design; Business Case; Poster (2019‒); Innovation; CAD; Autocoupler; Aerodynamics; Location announcement; Remote data logging; Ride-on locomotive
- Organizer: Institution of Mechanical Engineers Railway Division
- People: Simon Iwnicki; Lady Gretton; Bill Reeve; Malcolm Dobell; Tim Poole; Cliff Perry; Roger Goodall; Bridget Eickhoff; Lord Gretton; Alice Bunn; Tim Fairbrother
- Sponsors: Angel Trains; AtkinsRéalis; Rail Safety and Standards Board; Network Rail
- Website: www.imeche.org/events/challenges/railway-challenge

The IMechE Railway Challenge is a competition for teams of apprentices and students who compete to build and operate 1/5 scale railway locomotives in a number of challenges.

Events are organised by the Railway Division of the Institution of Mechanical Engineers and have been held annually since 2012 at the Stapleford Miniature Railway, near Melton Mowbray, United Kingdom.

== History ==
The Railway Challenge was initially proposed by Simon Iwnicki to the IMechE Railway Division Board in 2010. The aim was to demonstrate to prospective young engineers that there were interesting and challenging careers in railway engineering and it was partly a response to the huge success of the Formula Student competition where teams of university students design, build and compete with a small racing car.

A group was set up to prepare the rules and a short technical specification was drafted by Tim Poole from London Underground. It was decided that a ‘miniature’ gauge of 7 ¼ ” or 10 ¼ ” would be most suitable as this would result in locomotives of a manageable size and weight but that could incorporate real engineering systems. Former Railway Division Chair Cliff Perry led a review of all the suitable locations in Britain and a shortlist of four was drawn up:

- Bournemouth
- New Malden
- Audley End Railway
- Stapleford Miniature Railway

For various reasons including the central location, the space available and the track layout, Stapleford Miniature Railway was selected. Following a discussion with Lady Gretton of the Stapleford Estate and members of the FSMR (Friends of Stapleford Miniature Railway) a contract was signed between the IMechE and the Estate and the first Railway Challenge competition took place in 2011 with a final in June 2012. Stapleford has proved to be the perfect location for the Challenge and the support provided by the Estate (now through Lord Gretton) and the FSMR has allowed the competition to develop and thrive.

Over 15 years the number of teams has grown progressively. Around 25 members of the Railway Division support the Railway Challenge and the organisation of the event has become established with the following structure:

- Judges, led by Bill Reeve as Head Judge and Malcolm Dobell as Assistant Head Judge
- Scrutineers, led by Tim Poole
- Controllers, Originally led by Roger Goodall and now by Bridget Eickhoff
- Staff from the IMechE

The rules committee led by Tim Fairbrother review the rules each year and introduce new challenges to keep teams innovating and to represent the developments within the industry. The Railway Division Young Members (RDYM) provide support and arrange a social evening during the final.

== Challenge ==
The Track gauge is 10 1/4 in (260 mm) with the test circuit consisting of an 800-metre (0.5 mi) descent through a tunnel, a 1.2-kilometre (0.75 mi) balloon loop and a return up the 800-metre-long (0.5 mi) 1-in-80 (1.25%) incline.

During 2023‒2024 a new turntable with 21 sidings was constructed for use during the Railway Challenge. The turntable was opened by Lord Gretton and Alice Bunn for the 2025 event.

Bridget Eickhoff from the Rail Safety and Standards Board acts as operational controller for Railway Challenge.

=== Activities ===
From 2019 onwards, teams have been required to produce an academic poster communicating the design of their locomotive

Since 2019, an automatic stop test has been included, requiring locomotives to stop an exact distance after a marked position on the railway track.

=== Results ===
The 2025 challenge was won by the joint team of Network Rail & Colas Rail, with Nuremberg Institute of Technology second, and FH Aachen University of Applied Sciences third.

Results awarded in IMechE Railway Challenge
Team														(Note: Two differing sets of results are available (, ) for the IMechE Railway Challenge 2025. Both sets of results have the same ranking of teams, but differ in the exact point score awarded to each team.)	
Team	2012	2013	2014	2015	2016	2017	2018	2019	2020	2021	2022	2023	2024	2025	2026
Manchester Metropolitan University	2	2													
SNC-Lavalin (Interfleet Technology)	1	3	2	2	1291	1087	1087	✓							
University of Birmingham	✓	4	3	✓	107	1045	945		✓	✓		438	182		
University of Huddersfield		1	4	✓	283	893	372		✓	1	✓	129	573		303
Transport for London			1	1	789	820	780	2	✓		2	1334	1062	1360	1248
University of Sheffield			✕	✓	221	823	768	✓	✓	2	✓	1434	1724	1316	1879
University of Southampton				3	680	587	198								
WMG, University of Warwick					256	562	690	✓	✓	✓		312	544		
University of Derby & Alstom (Bombardier)					606	189	295	✓	✓	3	3	1631	1602	1295	230
FH Aachen						244	873	1		✓	1	1629	1269	1489	1911
Brunel University of London						19			✓						
Ricardo Rail							1162	3	✓						
Poznań University of Technology								✓	✓	✓	✓	1648	1406	1395	1831
Network Rail [& Colas Rail]									✓	✓	✓	1311	876	1603	1404
Lenz Ltd									✓	✓					
University of Newcastle									✓	✓	✓	461	807	720	530
Siemens Mobility													324		596
Technische Hochschule Nürnberg														1545	1528
Monash University, Australia														538	1583
ESTACA, France														542	462
Derby (Independents)	✓														
TE Connectivity, Swindon				✓											
Alstom UK & Ireland						267									
Queen Mary University of London									✓						
South Western Railway									✓						
IIT Kharagpur, India													316		
Heriot-Watt University													295		
University of Cambridge														476	
Anglia Ruskin University														434	
University of Lisbon															646

== European Railway Challenge ==
The European Railway Challenge is organised at Kürnbach (Bad Schussenried), Germany, on the 10 1/4 in (260 mm) track layout within the Oberschwäbisches Museumsdorf Kürnbach. The European Railway Challenge uses the same rules and is arranged a few weeks earlier, allowing teams the opportunity to practice and debug their equipment and techniques before travelling to Stapleford Park in England.
