= Stapleford Miniature Railway =

Steam railway in Leicestershire, England

Coordinates: 52.7564186°N 0.7995746°W

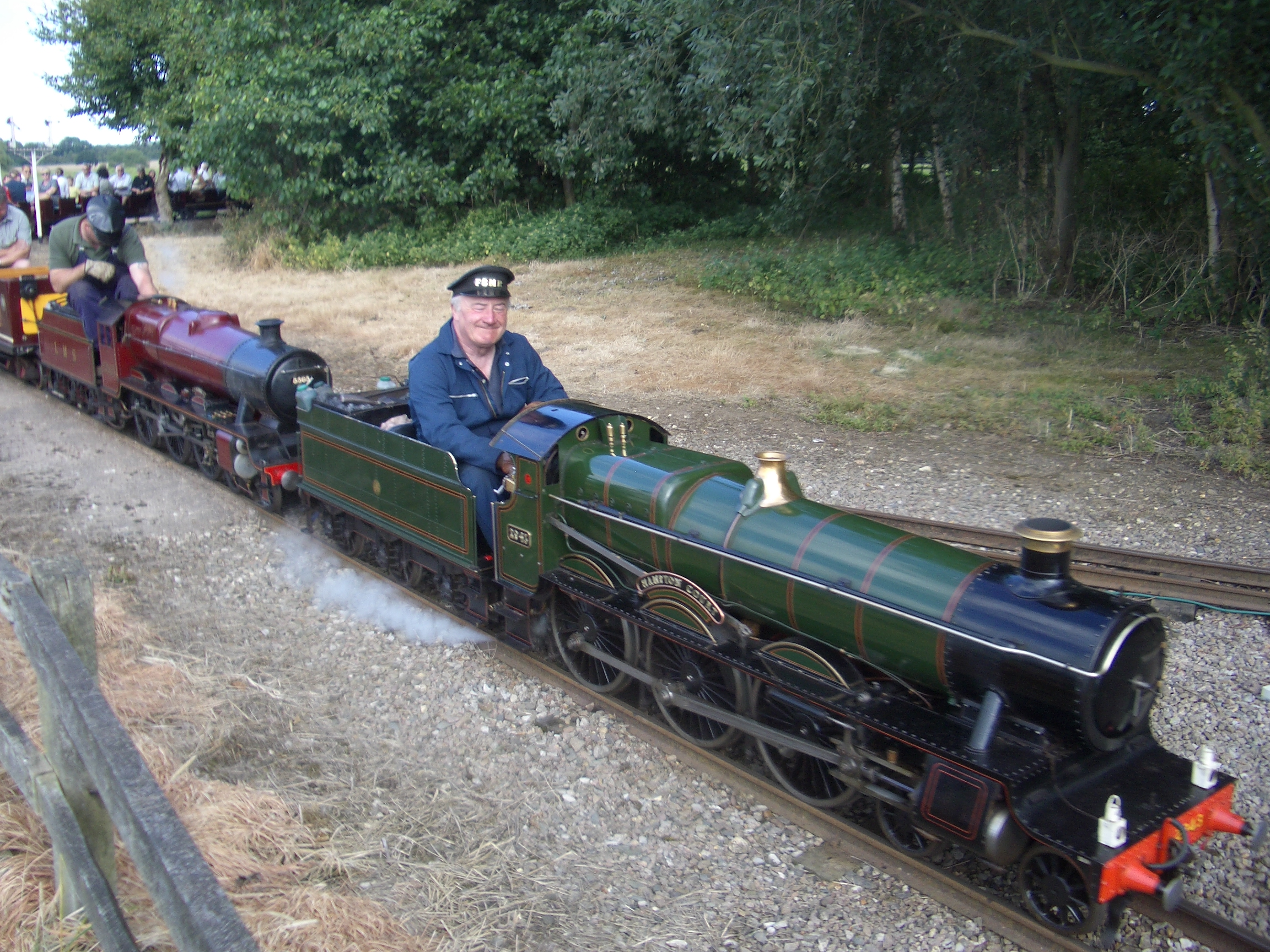
Stapleford Miniature Railway

Stapleford Miniature Railway is an historic steam locomotive-hauled 10 1/4 in (260 mm) gauge railway at Stapleford Park, Stapleford near Melton Mowbray in Leicestershire, England.

The railway is now private but still attracts thousands of visitors during its two public charity events each year, and through hosting of the annual IMechE Railway Challenge for students and apprentices.

== History ==
The ridable miniature railway was created in 1958 as a short line to carry visitors from the car park, to Lord Gretton's stately home. Due to its popularity, the railway was quickly expanded, running down to and then eventually around the lake in the landscaped parkland and the park which also featured a drive through lion reserve.

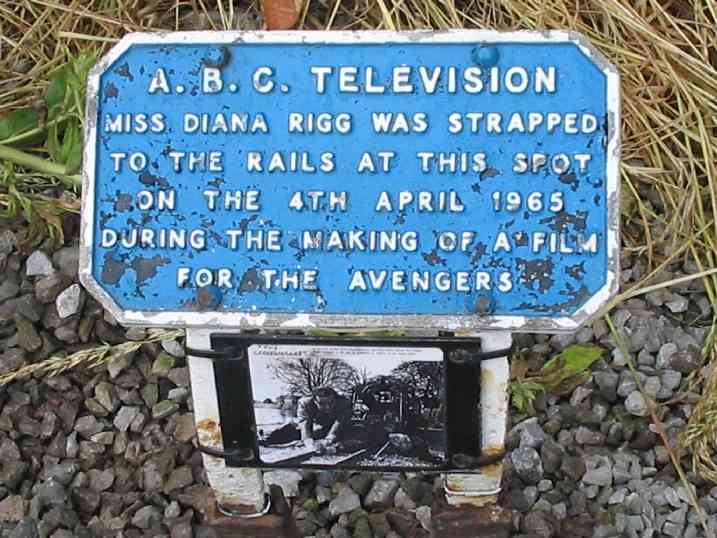
The Avengers location plate

The SMR featured in a 1965 episode of the television show The Avengers called "The Gravediggers", where Emma Peel (played by Diana Rigg) was tied to the railway track until Steed rescued her just in time.

After the estate closed its doors to the public in 1982, the railway was mothballed. It was restored by the newly formed friends supporting group FSMR under Jennifer Gretton, Baroness Gretton's stewardship during the 1990s and opened its doors to the public again in 1995. The railway opens twice per year as part of steam rallies in mid June and August Bank Holiday weekends, in aid of LOROS, the local hospice.

In October 2008 a new station was opened by Pete Waterman OBE.

== Route ==
The route is nearly 2 miles (3.2 km) of running length over an extensive heavily engineered scenic line, running through the parkland and crossing the River Eye on bridges. It includes an 80-metre-long (260 ft) tunnel with portals of Box Tunnel (West portal) and Primrose Tunnel (East portal).

== Locomotives ==
There is a fleet of seven steam and one diesel locomotive, including a 1/5th scale NKP Berkshire class, 1/5th scale NYC Niagara, 1/4 scale East African, 1/4th scale Harbours 31 Class.

No.	Name	Wheel Arr.	Year built	Designer	Builder	Outline	Prototype	Reference
505	Ypres	4-4-0	2017	David Simkins	David Simkins	British, standard gauge	GCR Improved Director Class	
751	John H. Gretton	4-4-2	1948	David Curwen	Baydon	Freelance	Freelance	
752	–	2-8-4	1971	Richard Coleby and Neil Simkins	Coleby/Simkins	American, standard gauge	New York, Chicago and St Louis Berkshire Class	
2943	Hampton Court	4-6-0	1939		Twining Models Ltd, Northampton	British, standard gauge	GWR 2900 Class	
3103	Uganda	2-8-4	2008	John Wilks	SMR	East African, metre gauge	EAR 31 Class	
5565	Victoria	4-6-0	1975	Coleby/Simkins	Coleby/Simkins	British, standard gauge	LMS Jubilee Class	
6019	–	4-8-4	1997	John Wilks	SMR	American, standard gauge	New York Central Niagara Class	

== IMechE Railway Challenge ==
During the summer 2012, the Institution of Mechanical Engineers held the inaugural "Railway Challenge" event at the SMR. This was aimed at university students and rail company graduates and apprentices. It was designed to expand their knowledge of railway engineering through a series of challenges, involving construction of a 10 1/4 in (260 mm) gauge locomotive to a demanding specification. The locomotives were of hybrid design, utilising innovative energy recovery systems. For the first event in 2012 four teams participated with teams from Manchester Metropolitan University, Birmingham University, Interfleet Technology of Derby in addition to an independent entry from Derby. The inaugural competition was won by the graduate team of Interfleet Technology, producing a Petrol-Electric locomotive of Bo-Bo construction, utilizing supercapacitors for energy storage. A similar event was run at the end of June in 2013 with four teams once again and was won by the University of Huddersfield, entering for their first time. The 2014 event was entered by five teams: Interfleet Technology, University of Huddersfield, Birmingham University, London Underground, and Sheffield University. Unfortunately Sheffield was unable to attend the competition with their loco and as such only the other four teams competed. This event was won by London Underground, entering for their first time.

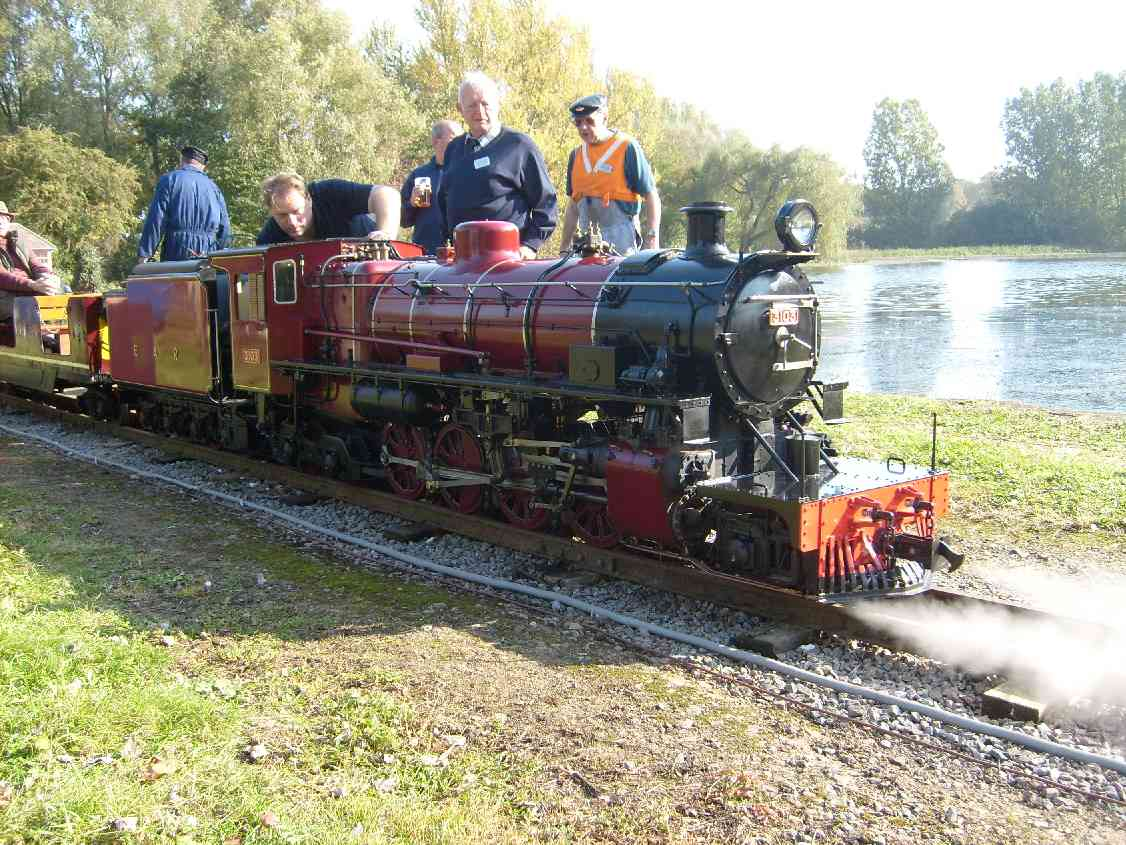
East African 31 class (EAR 31 class) locomotive

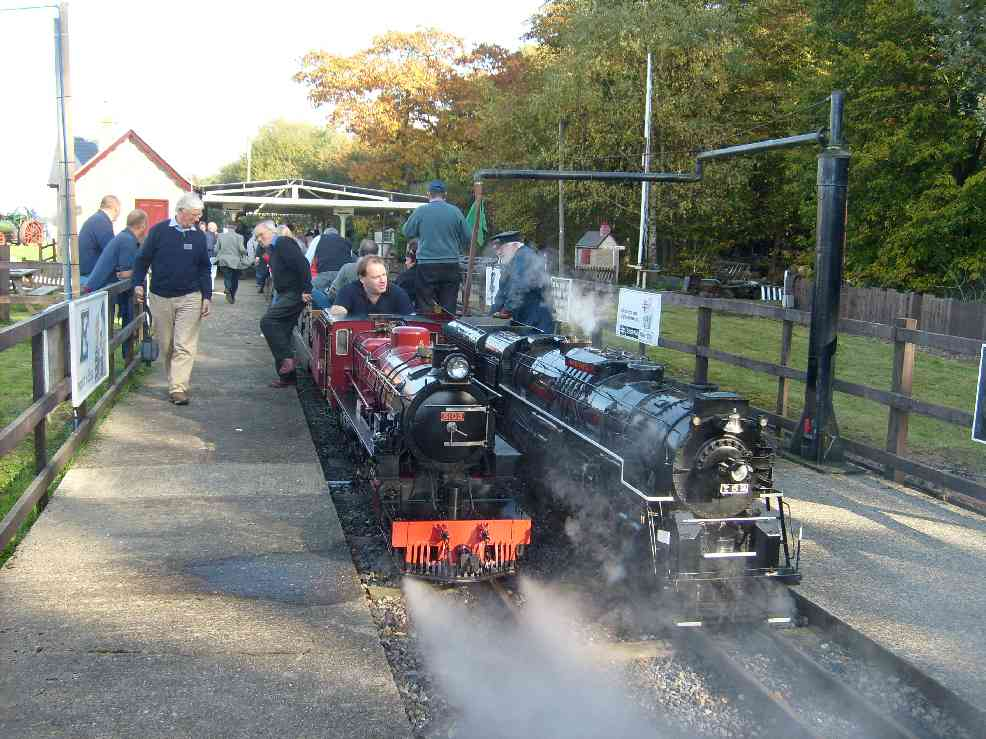
EAR 31 class and the Nickel Plate Road Berkshire class locomotives sit at the newly built station

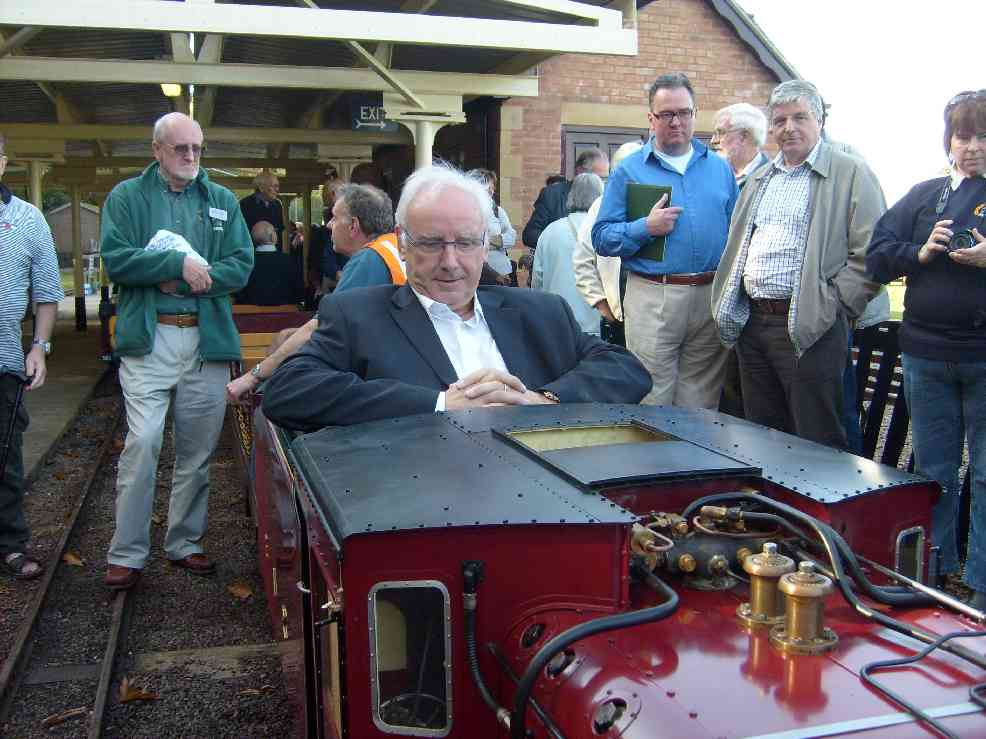
Pete Waterman at the controls of the EAR 31

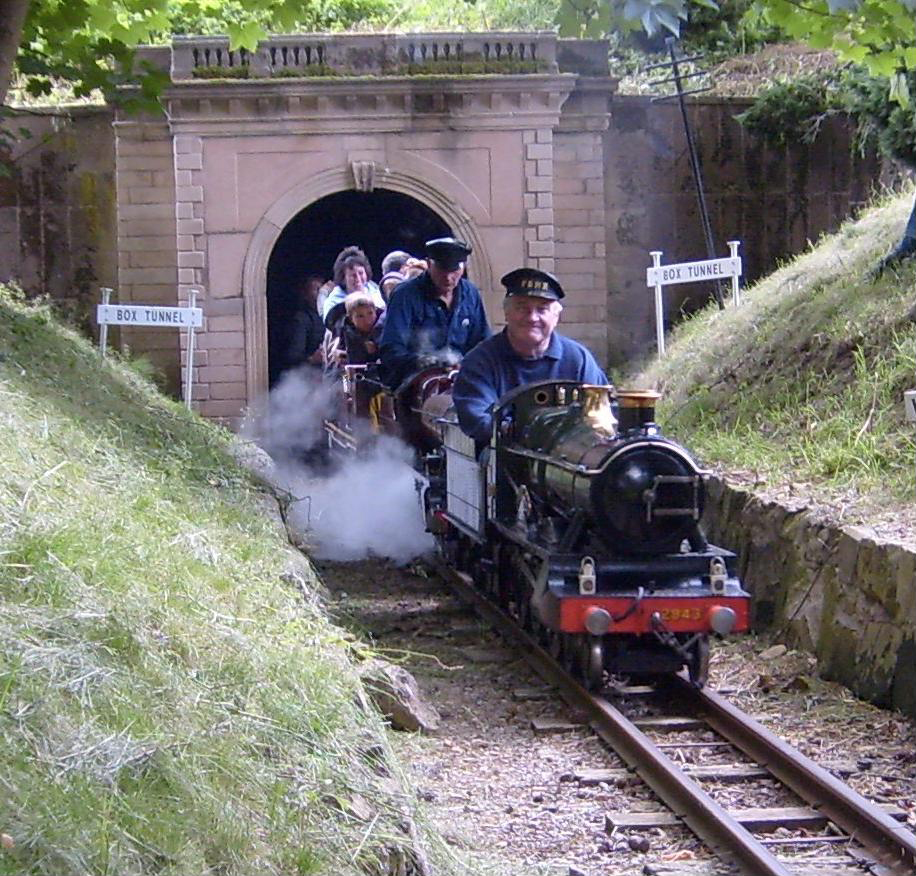
Box Tunnel replica at Stapleford with, appropriately, the extinct GWR Saint Class locomotive
