= Gretton =

Gretton may refer to:

== Places ==
- Gretton, Gloucestershire, England
- Gretton, Northamptonshire, England
  - formerly main settlement of Gretton Rural District and location of Gretton railway station
- Gretton, Shropshire, England

== Other uses ==
- Gretton (surname)
- Baron Gretton, a title in the Peerage of the United Kingdom
