= Bridget Eickhoff =

British railway engineer

Bridget Eickhoff CEng FIMechE FREng MBE
- Born: 1956 (age 69–70)
- Occupations: Principal infrastructure engineer, Rail Safety and Standards Board; Operational controller, IMechE Railway Challenge

Bridget Mary Eickhoff CEng FIMechE FREng MBE (born 1956) is a chartered engineer working in the field of railway engineering, within the United Kingdom. As of 2025 she was principal infrastructure engineer at the Rail Safety and Standards Board, covering rail transport in Great Britain.

== Career ==
Bridget Eickhoff started studying at New Hall, Cambridge in 1974 and graduated with a degree in mathematics from the University of Cambridge in 1977. She joined the British Rail Research Division working in engineering. Following the Privatisation of British Rail, Eickhoff continued working for what became AEA Technology, under Cliff Perry. In 2008, she joined the Rail Safety and Standards Board.

During 2012‒2013 Eickhoff was Chair of the Railway Division of the Institution of Mechanical Engineers. She acts as operational controller for the IMechE Railway Challenge for university students run by the Institution of Mechanical Engineers and held at the Stapleford Miniature Railway each year.

In November 2016 she led the annual IMechE Young Members Railway Technical Tour to visit railway facilities in Germany, and in 2019 led the Railway Technical Tour on a visit to Austria, Switzerland and the Czech Republic.

Her inaugural lecture at the University of Birmingham was held on 5 December 2018, entitled Minding the gap: how to improve boarding and alighting from trains.

In December 2019, she gave the final Permanent Way Institution London Section talk to be held at 55 Broadway, on the subject of Gauging historic infrastructure for the 21st century.

In April 2022, she gave a talk to the London and South East branch of Railfuture about differing railway platform height across railway lines in Great Britain.

=== Recognition ===
A paper by Eickhoff et al. was awarded the George Stephenson Gold Medal by the IMechE in 2016.

She was awarded the James Clayton Prize by the IMechE in 2017 at the Science Museum, London. Herbert Walker Swift, her great-uncle, had previously also won the James Clayton Prize in 1952.

During 2019 she was made a Fellow of the Royal Academy of Engineering.

In the 2025 Birthday Honours Eickhoff was made a Member of the British Empire (MBE) with a citation of "for services to railway engineering".

== Personal life ==
Eickhoff's partner is Felix Schmid, Professor emeritus of railway engineering.

== Publications ==
1900s

- Eickhoff, B.M.; Gostling, R.J. (1979). "Curving Tests with Laboratory Coach 1 on the Blaenau Ffestiniog Branch". Technical Note (49). BRB R&D Division.
- Elkins, J.A.; Eickhoff, B.M. (December 1979). Advances in non-linear wheel-rail force prediction methods and their validation. ASME Winter Conference. New York City.
- Clark, R.A.; Eickhoff, B.M.; Hunt, G.A. (September 1981). Wickens, A.H. (ed.). Prediction of the dynamic response of vehicles to lateral track irregularities. 7th IAVSD IUTAM Symposium. Cambridge, UK: Swets & Zeitlinger (published 1982). pp. 535‒548.
- Elkins, J. A.; Eickhoff, B. M. (June 1982). "Advances in non-linear wheel/rail force prediction methods and their validation". Journal of Dynamic Systems, Measurement, and Control. 104 (2): 133–142. doi:10.1115/1.3139688.
- Clark, R.A.; Eickhoff, B.M.; Hunt, G.A. (1983). "Prediction of the dynamic response of vehicles to lateral track irregularities". Technology Memo. TM DA (42). British Rail Research.
- Eickhoff, B. M.; Harvey, R. F. (August 1989). Anderson, R. (ed.). Theoretical and experimental evaluation of independently rotating wheels for railway vehicles. Eleventh IAVSD Symposium on the Dynamics of Vehicles on Roads and Tracks. Kingston, Ontario: Swets & Zeitlinger. pp. 190‒202.
- Eickhoff, B.M. (20 June 1990). "Kinematic envelope study for intercity 250 vehicle/track working party". J. Vdyn (188). British Rail Research Division. "InterCity 250 Vehicle/Track working party … calculation of Kinematic Envelopes."
- Eickhoff, B.M. (January 1991). "The Application of Independently Rotating Wheels to Railway Vehicles". Proceedings of the Institution of Mechanical Engineers, Part F: Journal of Rail and Rapid Transit. 205 (1). Institution of Mechanical Engineers: 43‒54. doi:10.1243/PIME_PROC_1991_205_215_02.
- Eickhoff, B.M.; Evans, J.R.; Minnis, A.J. (1995). "A review of modelling methods for railway vehicle suspension components". Vehicle System Dynamics. 24 (6‒7). Taylor & Francis: 469‒496. doi:10.1080/00423119508969105.
- Eickhoff, B.M.; Scott, G.A. (1996). "Structure Gauging—Maximizing the Use of Restricted Clearance". Proceedings of the Institution of Mechanical Engineers, Part F: Journal of Rail and Rapid Transit. 210 (2). Institution of Mechanical Engineers: 63‒71. doi:10.1243/PIME_PROC_1996_210_329_02.
- Eickhoff, Bridget; Scott, Graham (1996). "Fahrzeug und Gleis als gemeinsames System" [Vehicle and railway track as one system]. Eisenbahntechnische Rundschau (in German). Vol. 45, no. 7/8. pp. 441‒445.

2000s

- Eickhoff, B.; Nowell, R. (24 May 2011). Determining the benefit of train mass reduction. 9th World Congress on Railway Research. World Congress on Railway Research. London: Rail Safety and Standards Board.
- Eickhoff, B.M. (2009). "Wheel and Rail Profiles". In Schmid, F. (ed.). Handbook on Best Practice in the Management of the Wheel-Rail Interface on Mixed Traffic Railways. Darlington: A & N Harris. ISBN 978-0-952-9997-3-7.
- Eickhoff, Bridget; Mazzola, Laura; Bezin, Yann; Tucker, Gareth J.; Stradtmann, Hinnerk; Haigermoser, Andreas; Chollet, Hugues; Landais, Jérémy (August 2015). "Track loading limits and cross-acceptance of vehicle approvals". Proceedings of the Institution of Mechanical Engineers, Part F: Journal of Rail and Rapid Transit. 229 (6): 710–728. doi:10.1177/0954409715575092. hdl:11311/989573. ISSN 0954-4097 – via University of Huddersfield.
- Eickhoff, Bridget (20 April 2020). Gauging Historic Infrastructure for the 21st Century. Nottingham & Derby Section. Permanent Way Institution.
- Eickhoff, Bridget (30 April 2022). Towards step free journeys: the challenge of platform – train interface (Presentation). London and South East Branch (Report). Railfuture.
