= John Gretton, 1st Baron Gretton =

British politician (1867–1947)

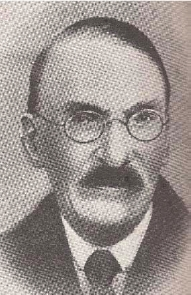
- 1900 Olympic Gold Medalist in sailing

Member of Parliament for Derbyshire South
- In office 13 July 1895 – 12 January 1906
- Preceded by: Harrington Evans Broad
- Succeeded by: Herbert Raphael

Member of Parliament for Rutland
- In office 11 June 1907 – 14 December 1918
- Preceded by: George Finch
- Succeeded by: Constituency abolished

Member of Parliament for Burton
- In office 14 December 1918 – 3 June 1943
- Preceded by: Robert Ratcliff
- Succeeded by: John Frederic Gretton

Personal details
- Born: 1 September 1867 Newton Solney, Derbyshire, England
- Died: 2 June 1947 (aged 79) Melton Mowbray, Leicestershire, England
- Party: Conservative
- Spouse: Maud Helen Eveleigh de Moleyns (m. 1900)
- Children: 3
- Relatives: John Gretton, 2nd Baron Gretton (son); Dayrolles Eveleigh-de-Moleyns (father-in-law); Brigadier Sir Henry Floyd (son-in-law); John Gretton (grandson)
- Education: Harrow School
- Sports career
- Sport: Sailing
- Classes: .5 to 1 ton Open class
Medal record
Sailing
Representing Great Britain
Olympic Games
Gold medal – first place	1900 Paris	Open class
Gold medal – first place	1900 Paris	.5 to 1 ton 1st race
- Updated on 8 May 2015

John Gretton, 1st Baron Gretton, CBE, VD, TD, PC, JP, DL (1 September 1867 – 2 June 1947) was a British businessman and Conservative politician. Gretton won two gold medals in the 1900 Olympic Games. He served as a Member of Parliament (MP) for 46 years, representing three midlands-based constituencies in that period.

== Life and career ==
Gretton was the eldest son of John Gretton of Stapleford Park and Marianne, daughter of Major John Molineux of Brook House, Compton in Surrey. John Gretton was educated at Harrow School. He was appointed chairman of Bass, Ratcliff and Gretton Ltd, the Burton-upon-Trent brewers in 1908 and served until 1945.

Gretton was a volunteer officer in the 2nd Volunteer Battalion, The (Prince of Wales's) North Staffordshire Regiment, and served as lieutenant-colonel and colonel when this became the 6th Battalion, North Staffordshire Regiment in the Territorial Force from 1907. He was appointed a captain in the Reserve on 24 February 1900.

At the outbreak of the First World War, he was confirmed as temporary colonel in command of the 6th Battalion. In 1920, the War Office appointed Lord Gretton as lieutenant colonel Reserve Officer until demobilised in 1922.

In 1895, he was elected to the House of Commons as Member of Parliament (MP) for Derbyshire South, a seat he held until 1906. He then represented Rutland from the 1907 by-election to 1918 and Burton from 1918 to 1943, when he was appointed an Officer of the Order of St John (OStJ). Gretton was made a CBE in 1919 and admitted to the Privy Council in the 1926 Birthday Honours. In 1944, he was raised to the peerage as Baron Gretton, of Stapleford in the County of Leicester. He was a Deputy Lieutenant of Derbyshire.

Lord Gretton precipitated by a speech the Carlton Club revolt that brought down the Lloyd George Coalition Cabinet in the British Parliament in 1922. In 1929, he forced the British Government to honour its pledge of compensation to the Irish Loyalists.

In 1940, Lord Gretton precipitated by a speech the fall of the Neville Chamberlain Government and its replacement by a Coalition. Lord Gretton was a leading champion of the Second World War as a crusade of good versus evil, and a war against the German nation before the Winston Churchill era. He was identified by the press as "an old Tory".

Lord Gretton married on 19 April 1900 The Hon. Maud Helen Eveleigh de Moleyns, youngest daughter of The 4th Baron Ventry, an Anglo-Irish peer. The couple had three children:

- John Frederic
- Kathleen Fanny married on 9 April 1929 Brigadier Sir Henry Robert Kincaid Floyd, 5th Baronet Floyd
- Mary Catherine Hersey married on 19 July 1933 Capt Edward William Brook, 20th Hussars, only son of Lt-Col Charles Brook of Meltham Mills, Yorkshire and Kinmount House, Dumfries.

He died in June 1947 in Melton Mowbray, aged 79, and was succeeded in the barony by his son John Gretton, 2nd Baron Gretton.

A noted yachtsman, Gretton won two gold medals in the 1900 Olympic Games. He is unique in winning an Olympic gold medal whilst serving as a member of the House of Commons. (John Wodehouse, MP for Mid Norfolk 1906–10, won a silver medal at the 1908 Olympic Games.)

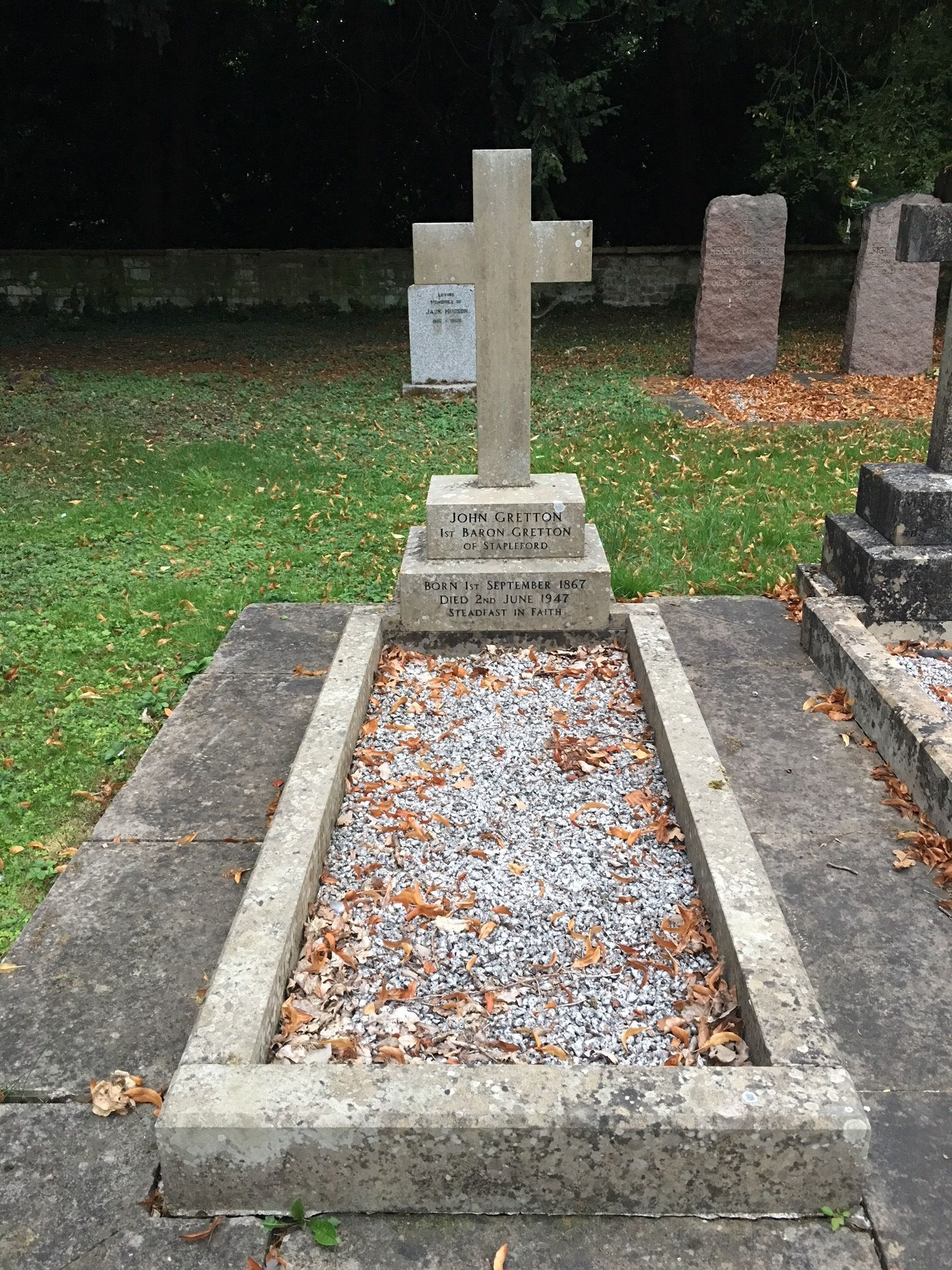
The grave of John Gretton, 1st Baron Gretton, in the graveyard of St Mary Magdalene's Church, Stapleford

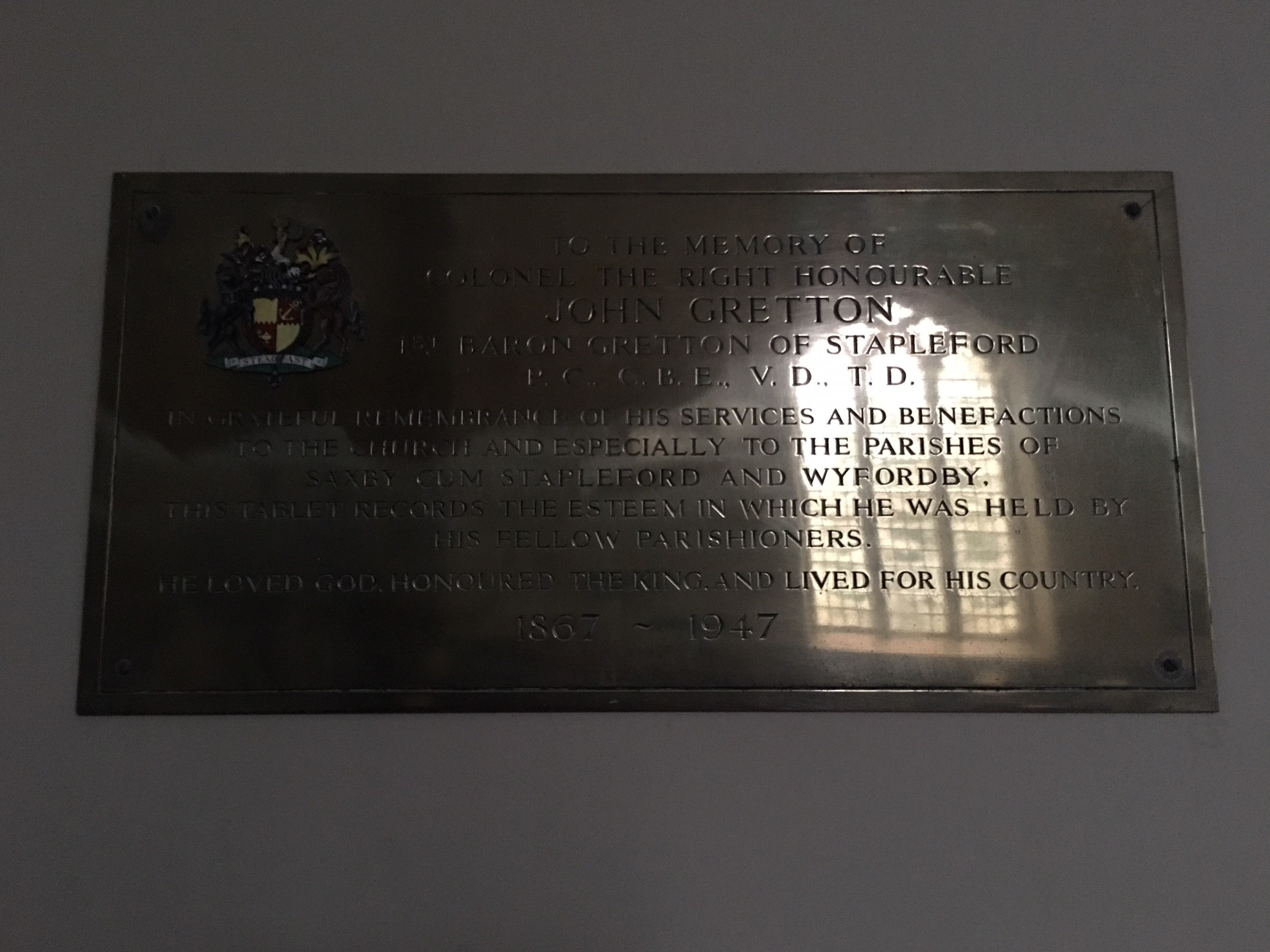
The memorial to John Gretton, 1st Baron Gretton, in St Mary Magdalene's Church, Stapleford

== Arms ==
Coat of arms of John Gretton, 1st Baron Gretton
Notes Coat of arms of the Gretton family Coronet A coronet of a Baron Crest An Arm embowed Proper vested above the elbow Argent holding in the hand a torch erect fired and a sickle in bend sinister both Proper. Escutcheon Quarterly per fess indented Or and Gules in the second quarter an anchor in bend sinister of the first and in the third quarter an antique lamp also Or fired Proper. Supporters Dexter a bull Sable sinister a Chestnut Horse Proper each gorged with a chain pendent therefrom an anchor Or Motto Steadfast

Parliament of the United Kingdom
Preceded by Harrington Evans Broad	Member of Parliament for Derbyshire South; 1895–1906	Succeeded by Herbert Raphael
Preceded by George Finch	Member of Parliament for Rutland; 1907–1918	Constituency abolished
Preceded by Robert Ratcliff	Member of Parliament for Burton; 1918–1943	Succeeded by John Frederic Gretton
Peerage of the United Kingdom
New creation	Baron Gretton; 1944–1947	Succeeded by John Frederic Gretton
