= 1943 Burton-on-Trent by-election =

UK by-election

The 1943 Burton-on-Trent by-election was held on 2 July 1943. The byelection was held due to the resignation of the incumbent Conservative MP, John Gretton. It was won by the unopposed Conservative candidate John Gretton.
