= 1907 Rutlandshire by-election =

UK Parliamentary by-election

The 1907 Rutlandshire by-election was held on 11 June 1907. The by-election was held due to the death of the incumbent Conservative MP, George Henry Finch. He had held the seat since 1867 and was Father of the House. The by-election was won by the Conservative candidate John Gretton who held the seat until 1918 when the constituency was abolished.

The Women's Social and Political Union suffragettes campaigned against the government. At an open-air meeting in Uppingham, Mary Gawthorpe and Christabel Pankhurst were pelted and Gawthorpe fell unconscious; Sylvia Pankhurst wrote that the "incident and her plucky spirit, made her the heroine of the Election".

Rutlandshire by-election, 1907
Party	Candidate	Votes	%	±%
Conservative	John Gretton	2,213	61.9	+5.2
Liberal	W. F. H. Lyon	1,362	38.1	−5.2
Majority		851	23.8	+10.4
Turnout		3,575	87.6	−1.7
Conservative hold		Swing	+5.2	
