= George Finch (politician, born 1835) =

British politician

Finch in 1895

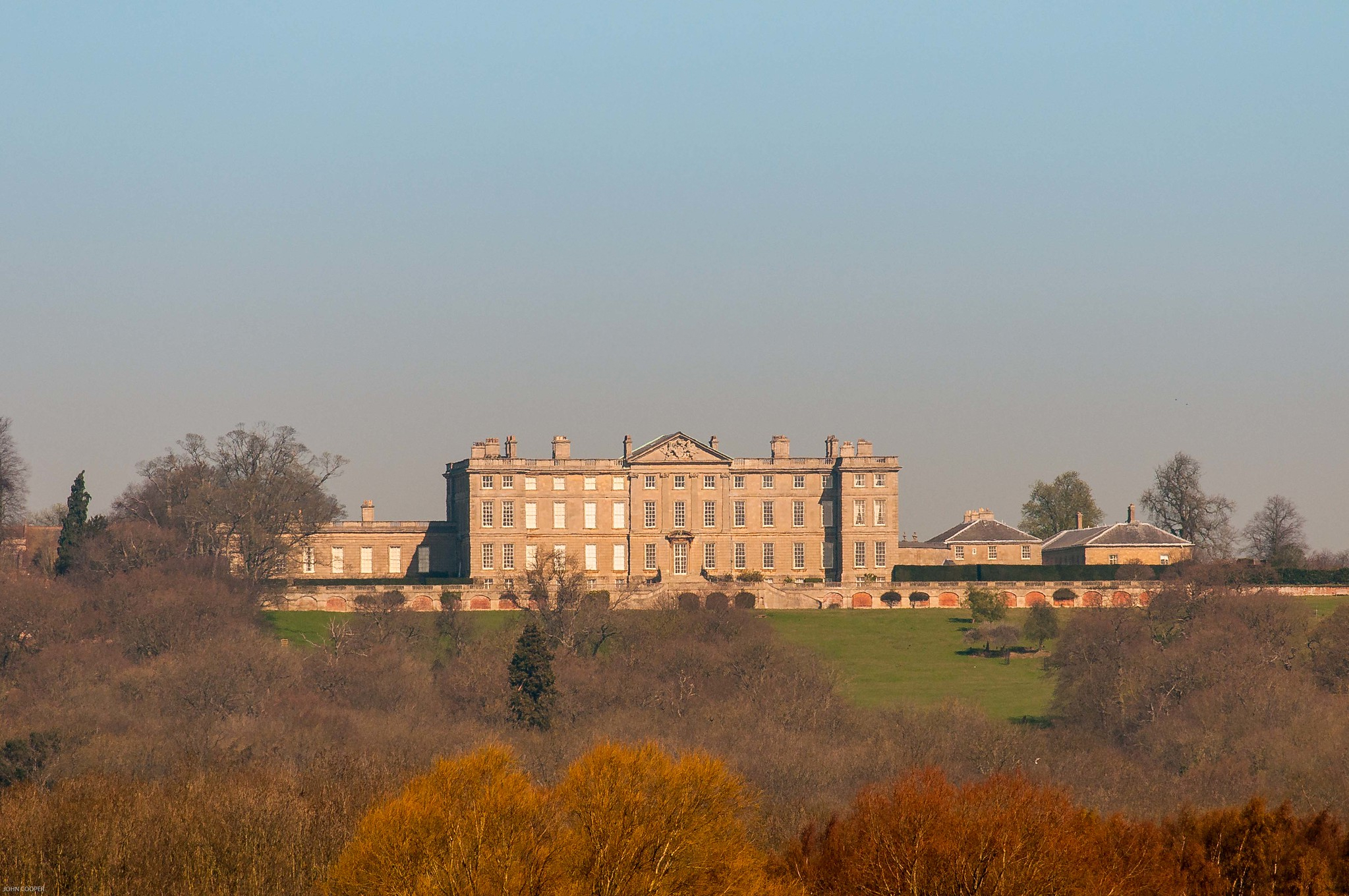
Burley House, Rutland

George Henry Finch PC (20 February 1835 – 22 May 1907) was an English Conservative politician who represented Rutland in the House of Commons for nearly 40 years, becoming Father of the House of Commons in 1906.

Finch was the son of George Finch, of Burley-on-the-Hill near Oakham and Belton. His father was the illegitimate son of George Finch, 9th Earl of Winchilsea. On the death of his father in 1870 he became an extensive landowner, inheriting Burley House, near Oakham, Rutland. His estate generated income of £29,000 a year.

Finch was elected as the Member of Parliament for Rutland on 23 November 1867. He held the seat until his death in 1907.

He married twice; firstly, in 1861, Emily Eglantyne Balfour, who died in 1865 after giving him a son and 2 daughters and secondly, Edith Montgomery, with whom he had a further 7 children. Burley House passed to his son Alan George Finch.

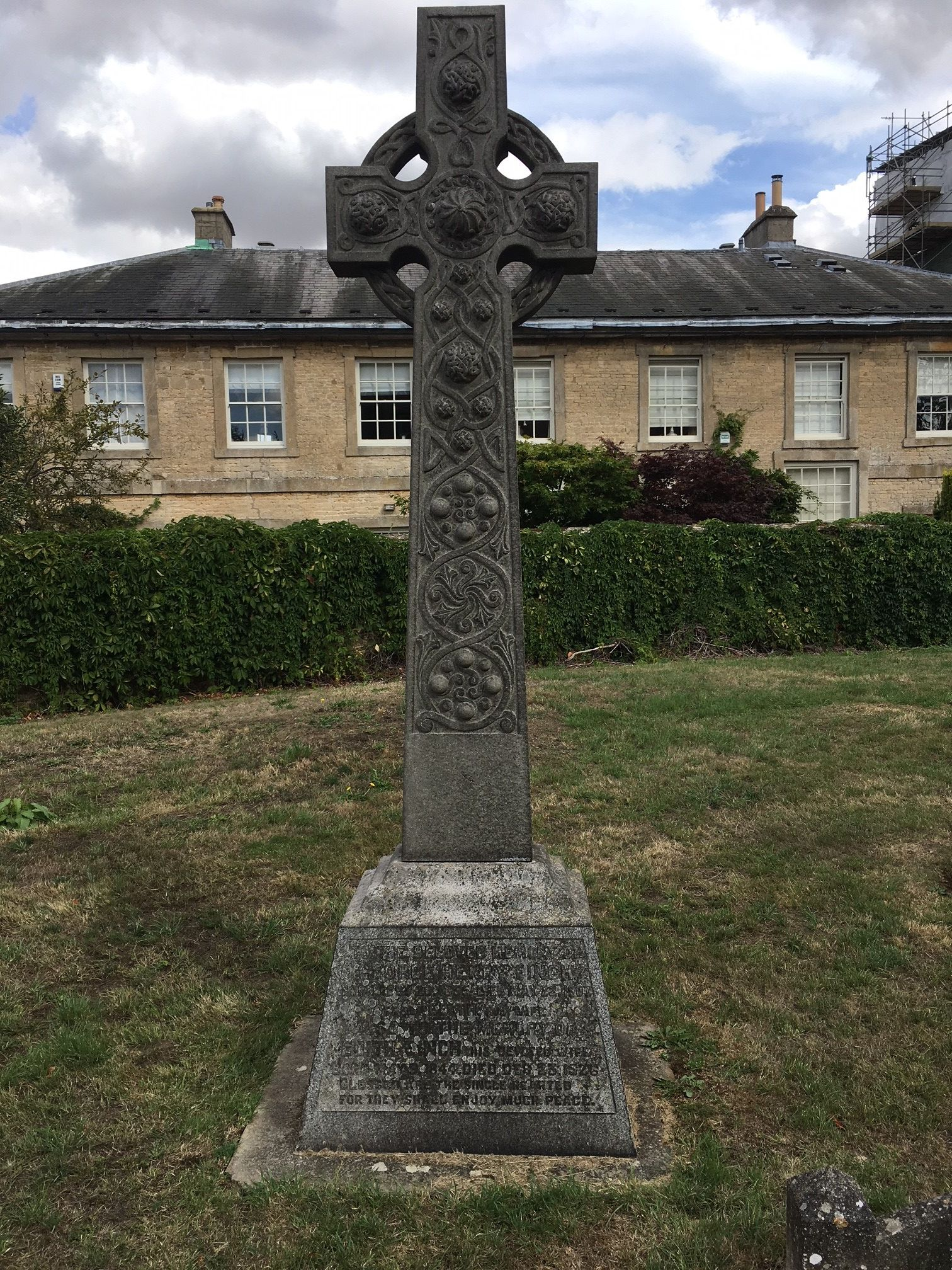
The grave of George Finch in the churchyard of Holy Cross Church, Burley

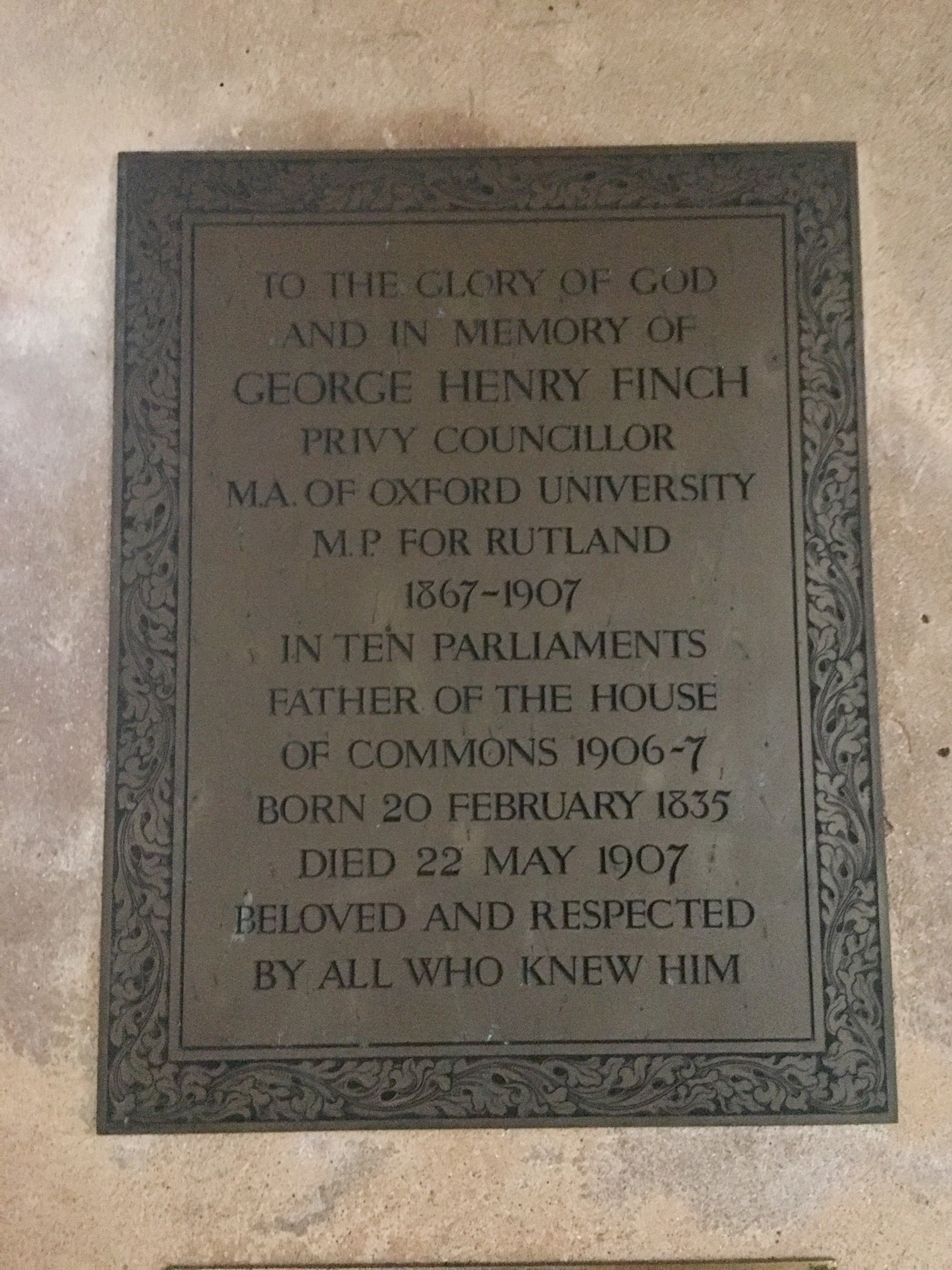
Memorial to George Finch in Holy Cross Church, Burley

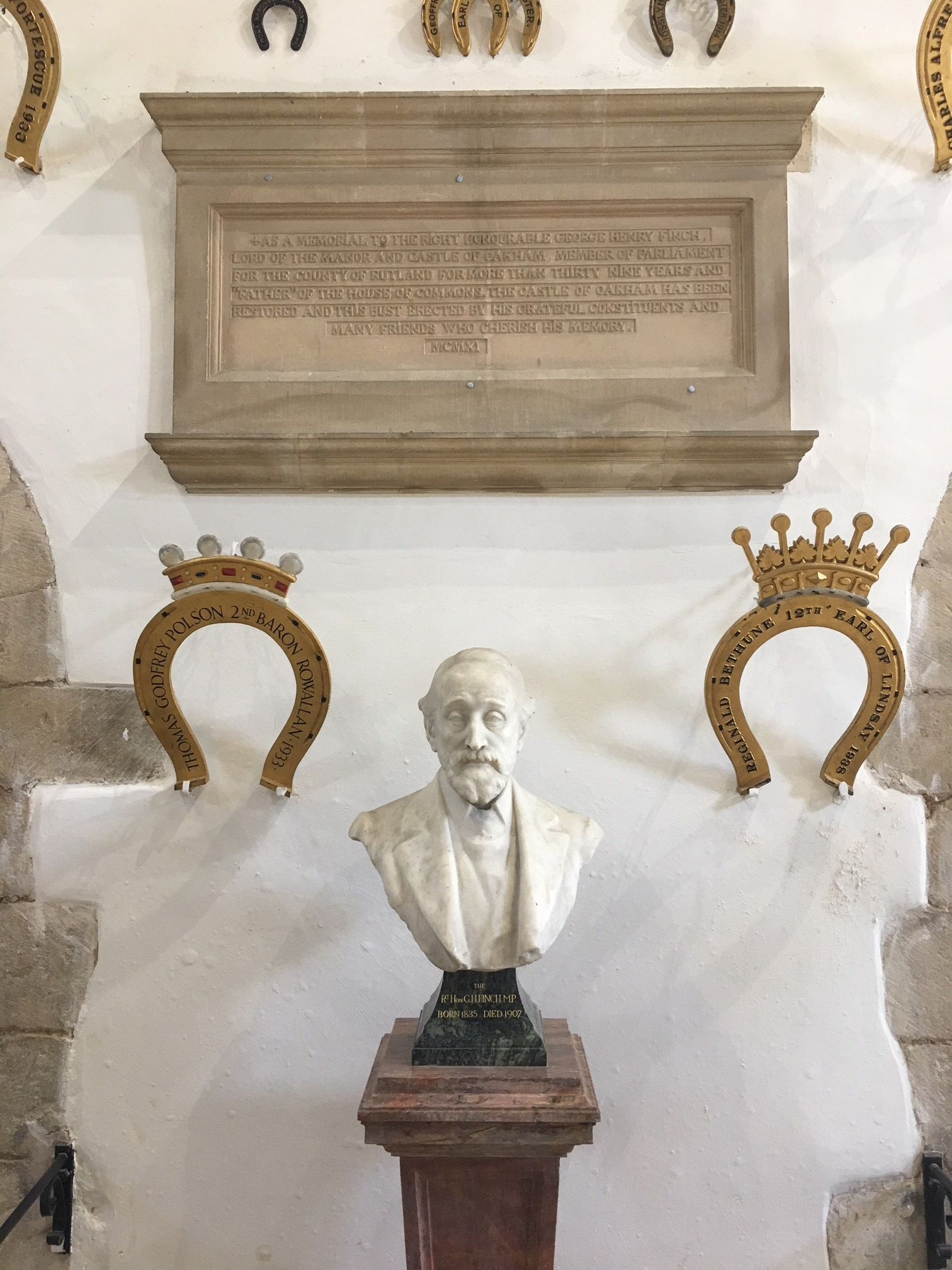
Memorial to George Finch in Oakham Castle

Parliament of the United Kingdom
Preceded by Hon. Gerard Noel; Hon. Gilbert Heathcote	Member of Parliament for Rutland; 1867–1907; With: Hon. Gerard Noel 1867–1883; James Lowther 1883–1885	Succeeded by John Gretton
Preceded by Sir Michael Hicks Beach	Father of the House; 1906–1907	Succeeded by Henry Campbell-Bannerman
