= Mike Kapur =

Lord Lieutenant of Leicestershire

Mike Kapur OBE CStJ FRSA

Lord Lieutenant of Leicestershire
- Incumbent
- Assumed office 14 June 2018
- Monarchs: Elizabeth II; Charles III
- Preceded by: Jennifer Gretton, Baroness Gretton

Personal details
- Born: Arvind Michael Kapur; 12 December 1962 (age 63)
- Spouse: Rita Kapur
- Children: 4

Arvind Michael Kapur (born 12 December 1962) is the Lord Lieutenant of Leicestershire. He succeeded Jennifer Gretton, Baroness Gretton in the role on 14 June 2018.

== Career ==
Kapur is the Founder and Director of Signum Corporate Communications, a Leicestershire Telecommunications Provider. Mike Kapur was appointed a non-executive director at Leicester Royal Infirmary in 1995 and following its merger in 2000 with two other large hospitals, he was retained as Deputy Chairman of University Hospitals of Leicester NHS Trust. He is currently Chairman of the National Space Centre in Leicester.

== Lord Lieutenant of Leicestershire ==
Kapur became Lord Lieutenant of Leicestershire on 14 June 2018, succeeding Jennifer Gretton, Baroness Gretton.
