= Gretton (surname) =

Gretton is a surname. Notable people with the surname include:

- George Gretton (born 1950), Scottish lawyer and academic
- Jennifer Gretton, Baroness Gretton (born 1943), English baroness
- Peter Gretton (1912–1992), Admiral in the Royal Navy
- Rob Gretton (1953–1999), Musicians' manager
- William Gretton (1736–1813), a master of Magdalene College, Cambridge
