= Baron Gretton =

Title in the Peerage of the United Kingdom

Baron Gretton, of Stapleford in the County of Leicester, is a title in the Peerage of the United Kingdom. It was created in 1944 for the brewer and Conservative politician John Gretton. He was head of the brewery firm of Bass, Ratcliff & Gretton Ltd of Burton upon Trent and also represented Derbyshire South, Rutland and Burton in Parliament. His son, the second Baron, also represented Burton in the House of Commons as a Conservative. As of 2017 the title is held by the latter's grandson, the fourth Baron, who succeeded his father in 1989. His mother, Jennifer Gretton, Lady Gretton, was Lord Lieutenant of Leicestershire between 2003 and 2018.

The family seat is Somerby House, near Somerby, Melton Mowbray, Leicestershire. The former family seat was Stapleford Park, also in Leicestershire.

== Barons Gretton (1944) ==
- John Gretton, 1st Baron Gretton (1867–1947)
- John Frederic Gretton, 2nd Baron Gretton (1902–1982)
- John Henrik Gretton, 3rd Baron Gretton (1941–1989)
- John Lysander Gretton, 4th Baron Gretton (b. 1975)

The heir apparent is the present holder's son the Hon. John Frederick Bruce Gretton. (b. 2008)

== Arms ==
Coat of arms of Baron Gretton
| Notes Coat of arms of the Gretton family Coronet A coronet of a Baron Crest An Arm embowed Proper vested above the elbow Argent holding in the hand a torch erect fired and a sickle in bend sinister both Proper. Escutcheon Quarterly per fess indented Or and Gules in the second quarter an anchor in bend sinister of the first and in the third quarter an antique lamp also Or fired Proper. Supporters Dexter a bull Sable sinister a Chestnut Horse Proper each gorged with a chain pendent therefrom an anchor Or Motto Steadfast |
