= EAR 31 class =

East African Railways 31 class
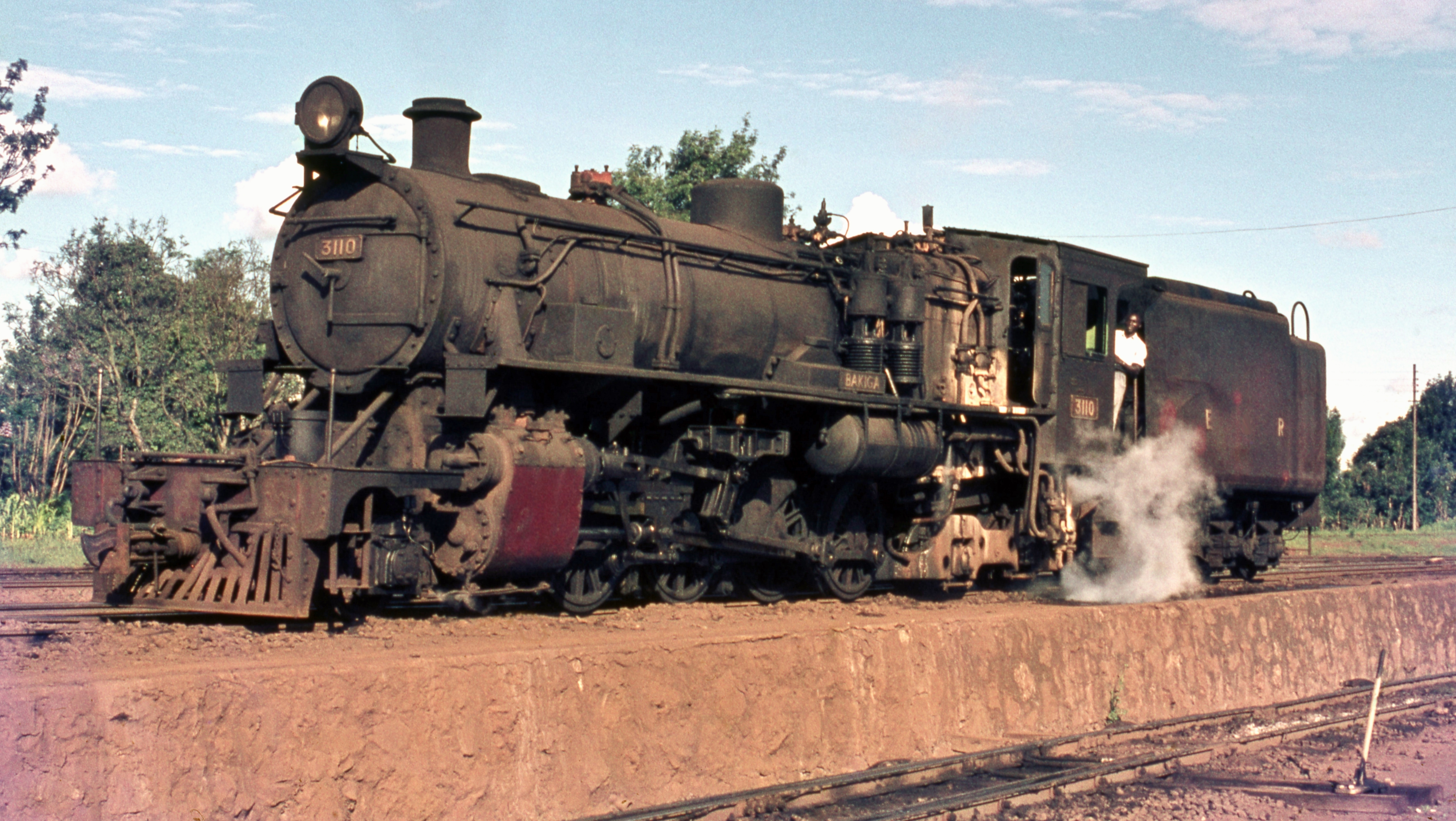
- No. 3110 Bakiga at Nairobi in 1968
Type and origin
- Power type: Steam
- Builder: Vulcan Foundry
- Serial number: 6228–6273
- Build date: 1955
- Total produced: 46
Specifications
- Configuration
  - Whyte: 2-8-4
  - UIC: 1′D2' h2
- Gauge: 1,000 mm (3 ft 3 3/8 in)
- Driver dia.: 48 in (1,219 mm)
- Adhesive weight: 45 long tons (46 t)
- Loco weight: 70.2 long tons (71.3 t)
- Fuel type: Oil
- Fuel capacity: 1,667 imp gal (7,580 L; 2,002 US gal)
- Water cap.: 4,108 imp gal (18,680 L; 4,934 US gal)
- Firebox
  - Grate area: 30 sq ft (2.79 m^{2})
- Boiler pressure: 200 psi (1.38 MPa)
- Heating surface
  - Firebox: 124 sq ft (11.5 m^{2})
  - Tubes: 1,511 sq ft (140.4 m^{2})
  - Total surface: 1,963 sq ft (182.4 m^{2})
- Superheater
  - Type: Inside
  - Heating area: 328 sq ft (30.5 m^{2})
- Cylinders: 2
- Cylinder size: 17 in × 26 in (432 mm × 660 mm)
- Valve gear: Walschaerts
- Loco brake: Westinghouse type
- Train brakes: Westinghouse type
Performance figures
- Tractive effort: 26,600 lbf (118.32 kN)
Career
- Operators: East African Railways (EAR)
- Class: 31 class
- Number in class: 46
- Numbers: 3101–3046
- Delivered: 1955
- First run: 1955

The EAR 31 class was a class of oil-burning 1,000 mm (3 ft 3 3/8 in) gauge 2-8-4 steam locomotives. The 46 members of the class were built in 1955 by Vulcan Foundry, in Newton-le-Willows, Lancashire (now part of Merseyside), England, for the East African Railways (EAR). They were a lighter, branch-line version of the EAR 30 class, and worked from various sheds throughout the EAR system.

== Class list ==
The numbers and names of each member of the class were as follows:

Builder's number	EAR number	Name	Notes
6228	3101	Baganda	
6229	3102	Batoro	
6230	3103	Acholi	Later renamed Uganda
6231	3104	Alur	
6232	3105	Bagisu	
6233	3106	Bagwe	
6234	3107	Bagwere	
6235	3108	Bahehe	
6236	3109	Bahororo	
6237	3110	Bakiga	
6238	3111	Bakoki	
6239	3112	Bakonjo	
6240	3113	Bamba	
6241	3114	Banyala	
6242	3115	Banyankore	
6243	3016	Banyaruanda	
6244	3117	Banyoro	
6245	3118	Banyuli	
6246	3119	Basamia	
6247	3120	Basese	
6248	3121	Basoga	
6249	3122	Batwa	
6250	3123	Bavuma	Preserved at Nairobi Railway Museum as a static exhibit
6251	3124	Chope	
6252	3125	Dodoth	
6253	3126	Jie	
6254	3127	Jonam	
6255	3128	Jopadhola	
6256	3129	Kakwa	
6257	3130	Karamojong	
6258	3131	Kenyi	
6259	3132	Kumam	
6260	3133	Lang'o	
6261	3134	Lugbara	
6262	3135	Madi	
6263	3036	Sebei	
6264	3137	Iteso	
6265	3138	Upe	
6266	3139	Pokomo	
6267	3140	Rendille	
6268	3141	Ribe	
6269	3142	Sanye	
6270	3143	Somal	
6271	3144	Tharaka	
6272	3145	Tsoto	
6273	3146	Wamia	

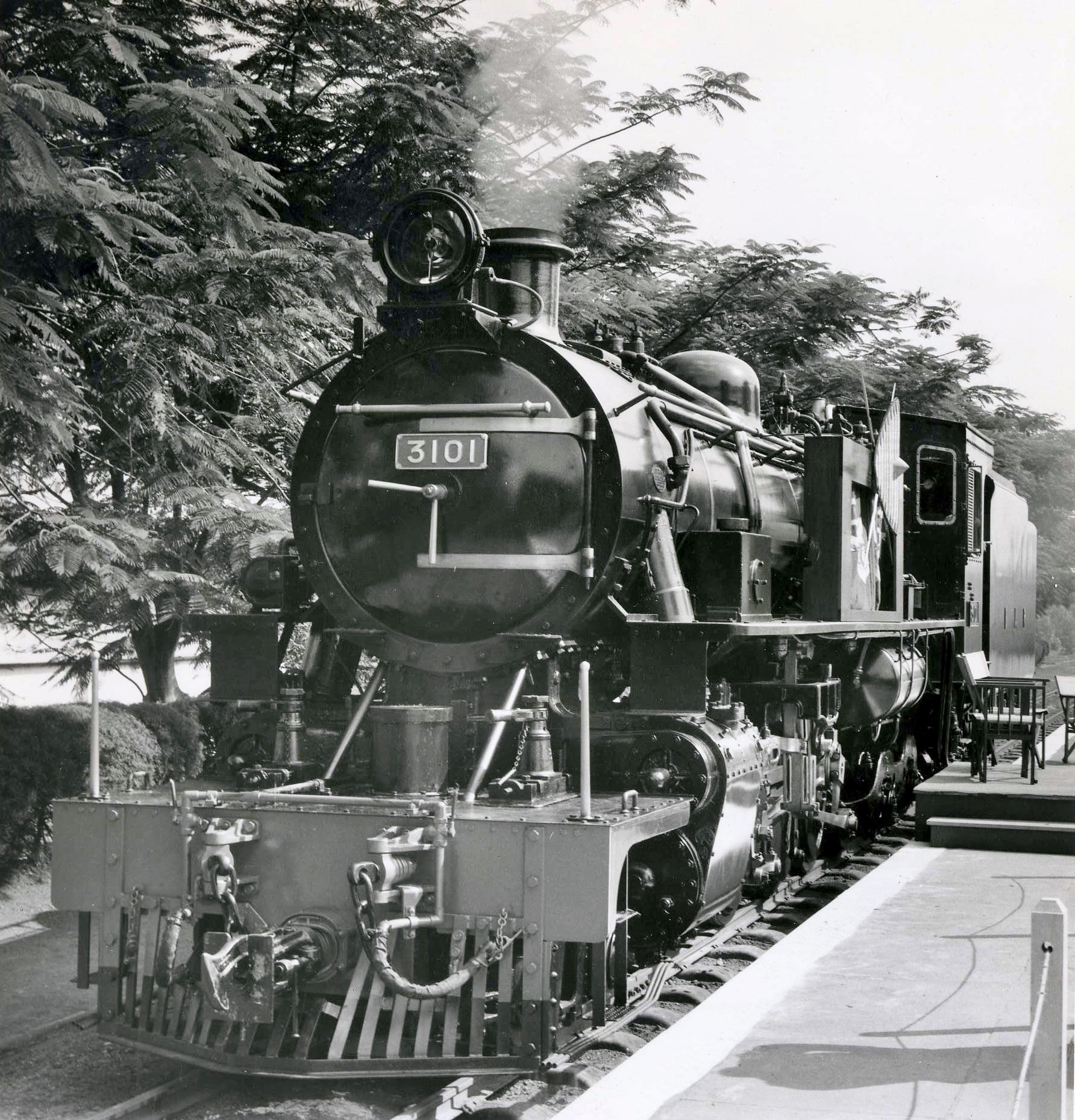
3101 at its naming ceremony

== See also ==
- History of rail transport in Tanzania
- Rail transport in Kenya
- Rail transport in Uganda
