= Rail vehicle resistance =

Total force necessary to maintain a rail vehicle in motion

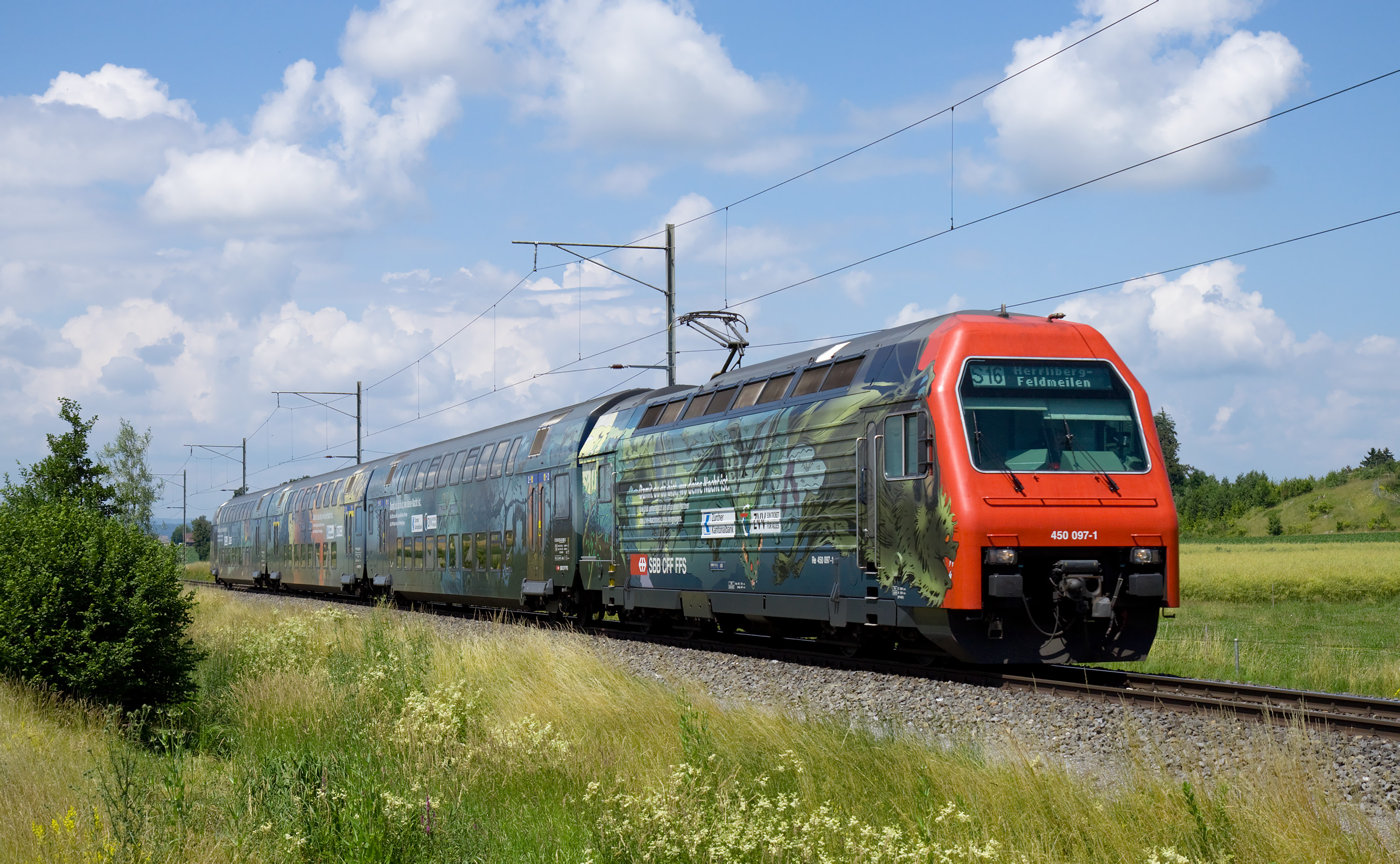
Rail vehicle (passenger train, SBB-CFF-FFS Re 450 double-decker)

The rail vehicle resistance (or train resistance or simply resistance) is the total force necessary to maintain a rail vehicle in motion. This force depends on a number of variables and is of crucial importance for the energy efficiency of the vehicle as it is proportional to the locomotive power consumption. For the speed of the vehicle to remain the same, the locomotive must express the proper tractive force, otherwise the speed of the vehicle will change until this condition is met.

== Davis equation ==
A number of experimental measurements of the train resistance have shown that this force can be expressed as a quadratic equation with respect to speed as shown below:

$R=A+BV+CV^2$

Where $R$ is the resistance, $V$ is the speed of the rail vehicle and $A$, $B$, and $C$ are experimentally determined coefficients. The most well-known of these relations was proposed by Davis W. J. Jr. and is named after him. The Davis equation contains mechanical and aerodynamic contributions to resistance. The first formulation assumes that there is no wind, however, formulations that do not make this assumptions exist:

$R=A+B_1V+B_2v+Cv^2$,

where $v$ is the speed of the air with respect to the vehicle while $B_1$ and $B_2$ are experimental coefficients that separately account for mechanical and aerodynamic (viscous) phenomena respectively.

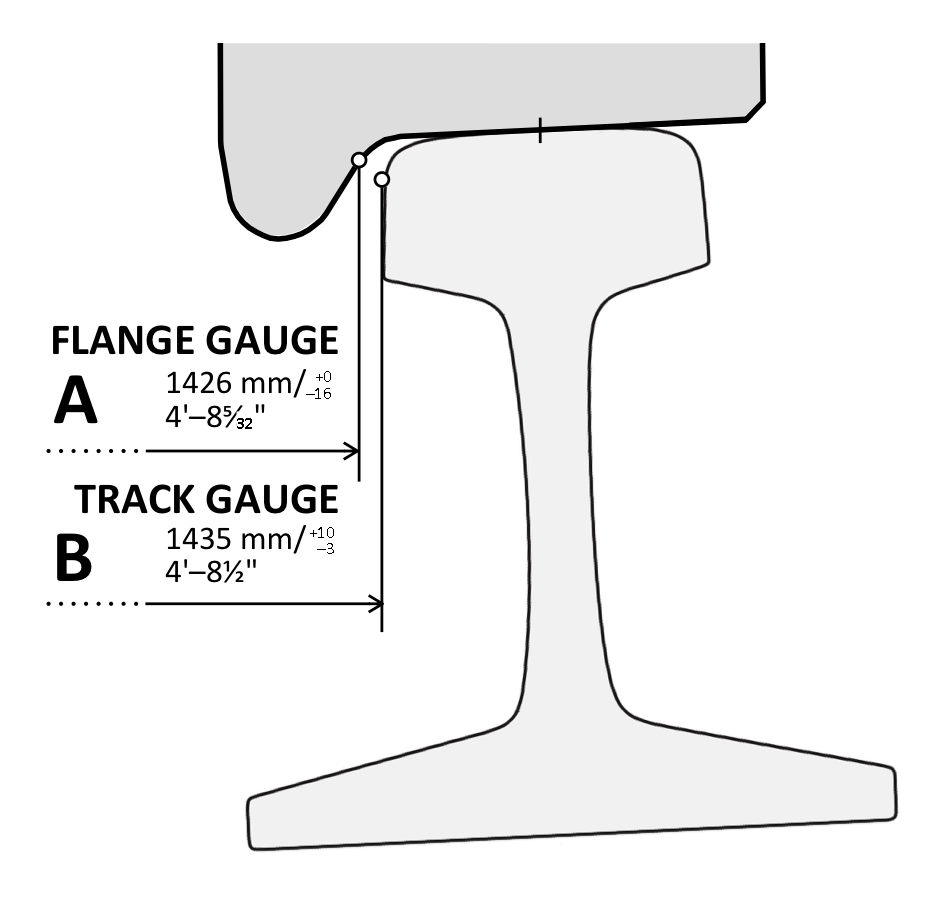
The flange gauge on the wheel keeps the vehicle from sliding from the tracks. The reaction force on the wheels result in sliding friction.

The coefficients for these equations are determined with experiments by measuring the tractive effort from the locomotive at different constant speeds or with a coasting experiments (the rail vehicle is set in motion at a certain speed and then the traction is disengaged, causing the vehicle to stop due to resistance).

Most methods for determining these coefficients do not consider the effect lateral forces on the vehicle. Lateral forces can be caused by the centripetal acceleration of the vehicle following the curving of the tracks, by lateral tilt of the rails, or by aerodynamic forces if crosswind is present. These forces affect the resistance by pushing the vehicle laterally against the rail causing sliding friction between the wheels and the rails. In case of crosswind, the resistance is also affected by the change in the aerodynamic contribution as a consequence of changes in the flow.

== Physical interpretation of the Davis equation ==
=== Speed-independent term ===
Illustrative scheme of tracks on a gradient

The first term in the Davis equation ($A$) accounts for the contributions to the resistance that are independent from speed. Track gradient and acceleration are two of the contributing phenomena to this term. These are not dissipative processes and thus the additional work required from the locomotive to overcome the increased resistance is converted to mechanical energy (potential energy for the gradient and kinetic energy for the acceleration). The consequence of this is that these phenomena may, in different conditions, result in positive or negative contributions to the resistance. For example, a train decelerating on horizontal tracks will experience reduced resistance than if it where travelling at constant speed. Other contributions to this term are dissipative, for example bearing friction and rolling friction due to the local deformation of the rail at the point of contact with the wheels, these latter quantities can never reduce the train resistance.

The term $A$ is constant with respect to vehicle speed but various empirical relations have been proposed to predict its value. It is the general consensus that the term is directly related to the mass of the vehicle with some observing an effect of the number axles as well as the axle loads.

=== Speed-linear term ===
The coefficient in the second term of the Davis equation ($B$) relates to the terms linearly dependent on speed and is sometimes omitted because it is negligible compared to the other terms. This term accounts for mass-related, speed-dependent, mechanical contributions to the resistance and for the momentum of the intake air for cooling and HVAC.

Similarly to $A$, empirical formulas have been proposed to evaluate the term $B$, and again a mass dependence is present in all major methods for determining the rail vehicle resistance coefficients, with some also observing a dependence from number of trailers and locomotives or a dependence from length.

=== Speed-quadratic term ===
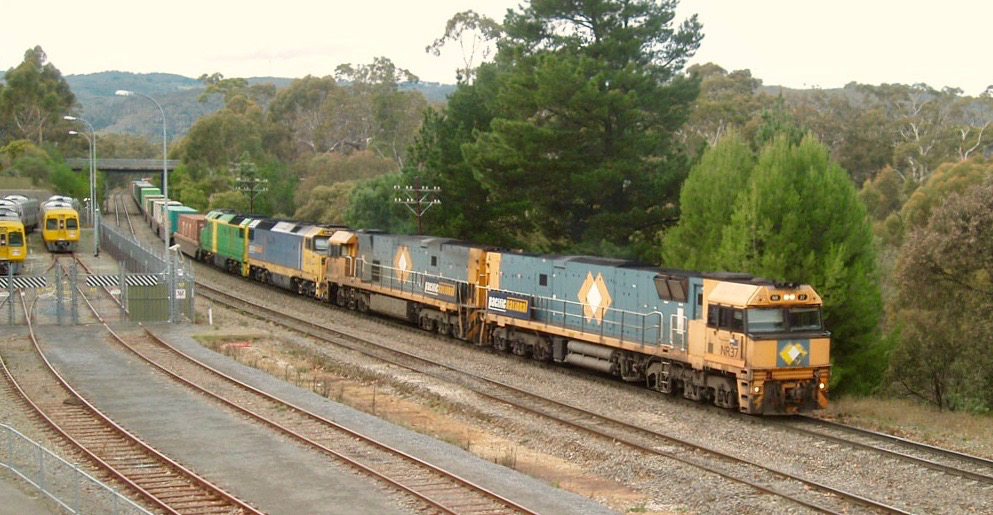
Freight trains are designed with bluff shapes

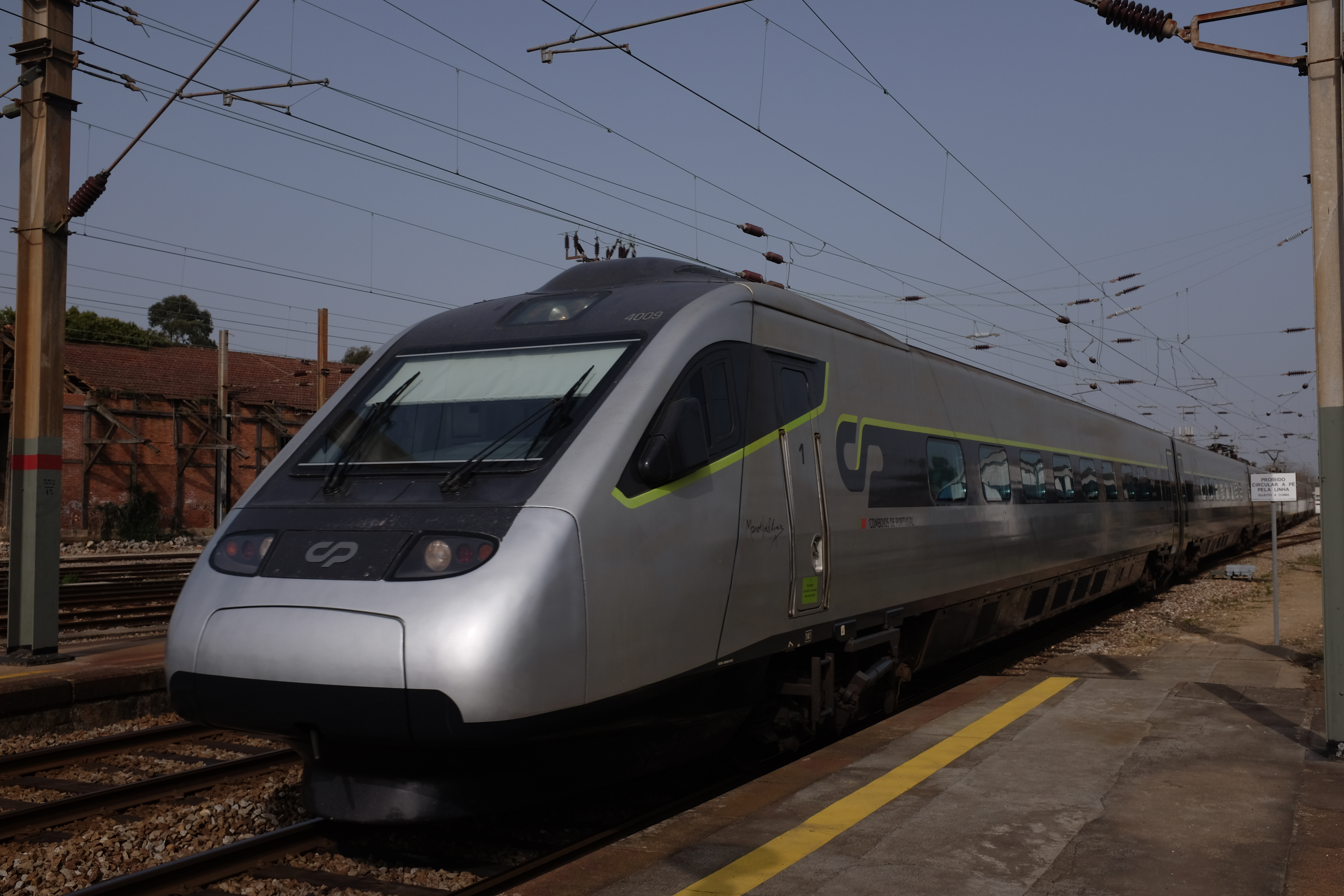
Passenger trains have a more streamlined shape

The coefficient in the third term of the Davis equation ($C$) accounts for the aerodynamic drag acting on the vehicle, it is explained by the fact that as the train moves through the air, it sets some of the air surrounding it in motion (this is called slipstream). To maintain constant speed, the continuous transfer of momentum to the air needs to be compensated by an additional tractive force by the locomotive, this is accounted for by this term. As train speed increases, the aerodynamic drag becomes the dominant contribution to the resistance, for high-speed trains above 250 km/h and for freight trains above 115 km/h it accounts for 75-80% of the resistance.

This term is highly dependent on the geometry of the vehicle, and therefore it will be much lower for the streamlined high-speed passenger train than for freight trains, which behave like bluff bodies and produce much larger and more turbulent slipstreams at the same vehicle speed, leading to increased momentum transfer to the surrounding air.

Few general considerations can be made about the aerodynamic contribution to rail vehicle resistance because the aerodynamic drag heavily depends on both flow conditions and the geometry of the vehicle. However, the drag is higher in crosswind conditions than in still air, and for small angles the relation between drag coefficient and yaw angle is approximately linear.

== Empirical relations for the Davis equation coefficients ==
In the years, empirical relations have been proposed for estimating the values of the coefficients for the Davis equation, these however also rely on more coefficients to determine experimentally. Below are the relations proposed by Armstrong and Swift:

$A=6.4M_t+8.0M_l$

$B=0.18(M_t+M_l)+1N_t+0.005N_lP$

$C=0.6125C_D(head,tail)A_f+0.00197pL+0.0021pG_i(N_t+N_l -1)+0.2061C_D(bogies)N_b+0.2566N_p$

Where $M_t$ and $M_l$ are respectively the total mass of the trailer cars and the total mass of the locomotives expressed in tons, $N_t$, $N_l$, $N_b$ and $N_p$ are respectively the number of trailer cars, the number of locomotives, the number of bogies and the number of pantographs, $P$ is the total power expressed in kW, $C_D(head,tail)$ and $C_D(bogies)$ are respectively the head/tail drag coefficients and the bogies drag coefficients, $A_f$ is the frontal cross-sectional area in square metres, $p$ is the perimeter, $L$ is the length and $G_i$ is the intervehicle gap (all lengths expressed in meters). The coefficients $A$, $B$ and $C$ are expressed in N, Ns/m and Ns^{2}/m^{2}.

== See also ==
- Tractive effort
- Traction (mechanics)
- Rolling friction
- Drag (physics)
