= Sanye language =

Sanye may be any of several Cushitic languages spoken by former hunter-gatherers in Kenya:

- Aweer language
- Dahalo language
- Waata language

The "Sanye" in Greenberg is Dahalo.
