= John Gretton, 4th Baron Gretton =

English peer

John Lysander Gretton, 4th Baron Gretton (born 17 April 1975), is an English peer, landowner and farmer.

Lord Gretton was born in 1975, the only son of John Gretton, later 3rd Baron, and his wife Jennifer Ann (née Moore), later Lady Gretton. He was educated at Shrewsbury School and RAC Cirencester. He succeeded his father as Baron Gretton on his father's death in 1989, whilst still farming at Somerby House, Leicestershire. The House of Lords Act 1999 removed the right of hereditary peers to sit in the House of Lords; so far Baron Gretton has not been one of the peers elected to be excepted from this either in the initial elections or any subsequent by elections.

== Arms ==
Coat of arms of John Gretton, 4th Baron Gretton
Notes Coat of arms of the Gretton family Coronet A coronet of a Baron Crest An Arm embowed Proper vested above the elbow Argent holding in the hand a torch erect fired and a sickle in bend sinister both Proper. Escutcheon Quarterly per fess indented Or and Gules in the second quarter an anchor in bend sinister of the first and in the third quarter an antique lamp also Or fired Proper. Supporters Dexter a bull Sable sinister a Chestnut Horse Proper each gorged with a chain pendent therefrom an anchor Or Motto Steadfast

Peerage of the United Kingdom
Preceded by John Gretton	Baron Gretton; 1989–present Member of the House of Lords (1989–1999)	Incumbent; Heir apparent: Hon. John Gretton
