= Swets =

Swets Information Services
- Industry: Publishing
- Founded: 1901
- Founder: Adriaan Swets, Heinrich Zeitlinger
- Headquarters: Netherlands
- Area served: Worldwide
- Number of employees: 591
- Website: web.archive.org/web/20141218085019/http://swetsinformationservices.com/

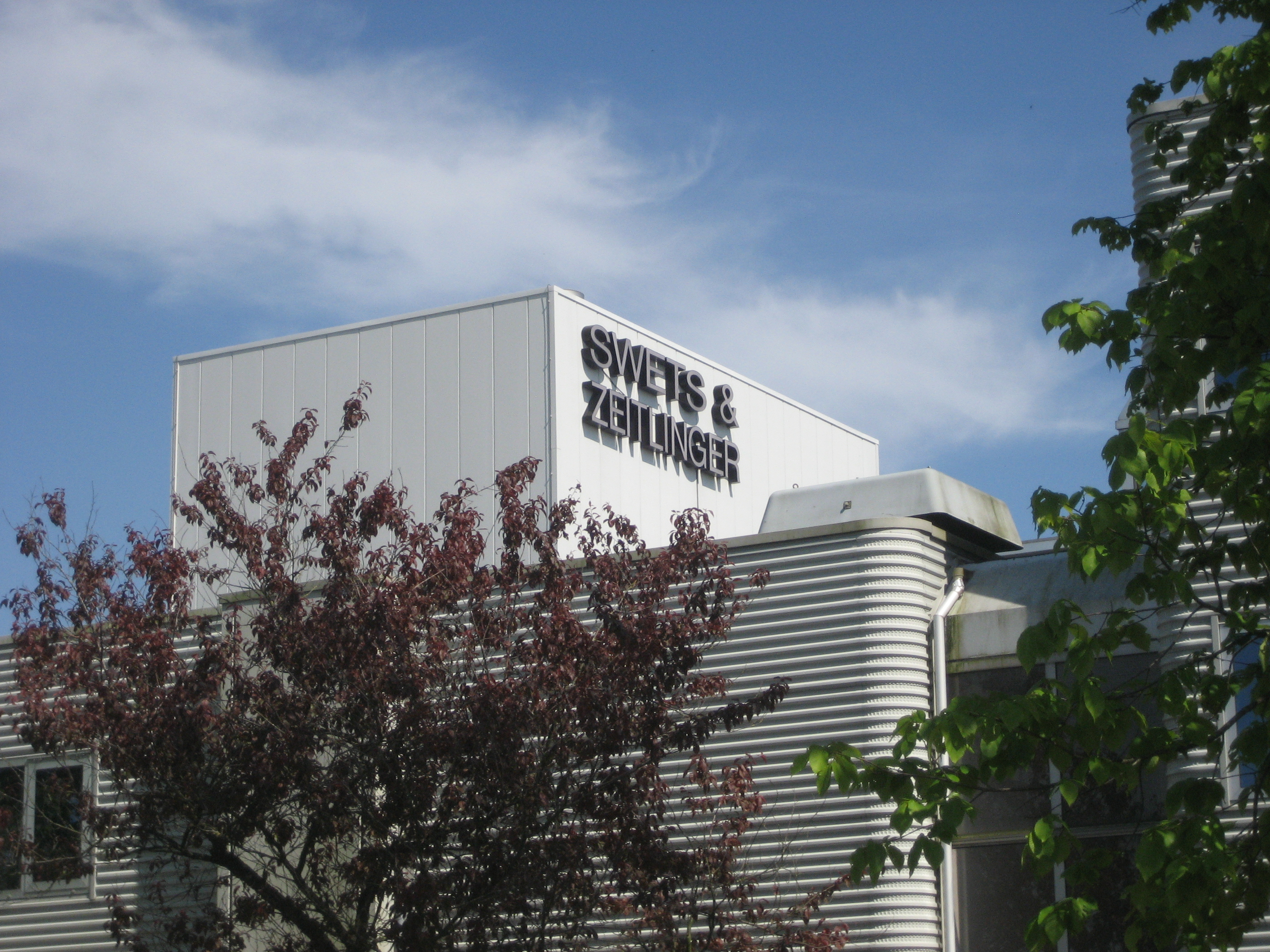
Former office buildings of Swets in Lisse (The Netherlands)

Royal Swets & Zeitlinger Holding NV (Koninklijke Swets & Zeitlinger Holding NV), operating under the trade name Swets, was a group of information services companies operating worldwide as an intermediary between publishers and libraries. Swets provided overall management and processing of subscriptions to scientific and professional printed and electronic publications for libraries. The parent company of Royal Swets & Zeitlinger Holding was Swets & Zeitlinger Group BV, and its main trading subsidiary was Swets Information Services BV. The Swets companies were progressively declared bankrupt between September and November 2014.

Swets' 2013 annual report, released on 8 August 2014, included the following market update report: "2013 was a turbulent year for Swets. It has become clear that the intended transformation of Swets requires more capital and scale than is currently available. The ultimate shareholders of Swets Group in close the lenders have decided to put all shares of Royal Swets & Zeitlinger Holding N.V. up for sale and have initiated a competitive auction process with a planned sale in Q3 2014. The lenders support the plan and have decided to postpone the demand for repayment as long as the execution of the sales process develops according to the plan". The market update further stated that as Swets had "failed to meet its covenant requirements related to the long term financing. As a consequence of this breach the lenders are entitled to demand immediate repayment." The problems were attributed to the move from print to digital publishing, which has lower commissions, and facilitates direct publisher–customer relationships in place of intermediaries.

== History ==
- Founded by Adriaan Swets & Heinrich Zeitlinger in 1901
- Swets bought out Zeitlinger after one year
- Swets remained 100% owned by the Swets family until the mid-nineties
- In 2003, Swets & Zeitlinger Publishers was sold to Taylor & Francis
- In 2007 Swets was sold to Gilde, a Dutch investment firm
- In 2008/09 Swets opened offices in India, New Zealand, Finland, Austria & Switzerland, China
- Also in 2008 Swets acquired Boekhandel E. Frencken BV
- In 2010 started comprehensive e-book catalog and procurement options, supplying over 1 million e-books in 2011
- In 2011 Swets acquired the publisher communication services company Accucoms
- In 2014 Gilde put Swets up for sale.
- On 23 September 2014, Swets Information Services BV filed for and was granted bankruptcy.
- Between September and November 2014, Koninklijke Swets & Zeitlinger Holding and the other Swets companies were declared bankrupt.
- Private investment company Oak Point Partners acquired the remnant assets, consisting of any known and unknown assets that weren't previously administered, from the Swets Information Services, Inc. Bankruptcy Estate on January 9, 2018.

== Partnerships ==
Swets partner products and services were:

- ALJC (by ALPSP)
- PressDisplay (by Newspaperdirect)
- e-Select
- Scholarly Stats
- Document Delivery Service
- Mendeley Institutional Edition, powered by Swets
- Discovery Services (by Deep Web Technologies)

== See also ==
- Electronic publishing
