= Jennifer Gretton, Baroness Gretton =

Former Lord Lieutenant of Leicestershire

The Right Honourable The Baroness Gretton DCVO JP DL

Lord Lieutenant of Leicestershire
- In office 1 February 2003 – 14 June 2018
- Monarch: Elizabeth II
- Preceded by: Sir Timothy Brooks
- Succeeded by: Mike Kapur

Personal details
- Born: Jennifer Ann Moore; 14 June 1943 (age 82) St Ives, Cornwall, England
- Spouse: John Gretton, 3rd Baron Gretton

Jennifer Ann Gretton, Baroness Gretton, DCVO, DStJ, JP, DL (born 14 June 1943) is a former Lord Lieutenant of Leicestershire, serving for over 15 years between 2003 and 2018.

== Life ==
She was born in St Ives, Cornwall, and married John Gretton, 3rd Baron Gretton. Since her husband's death in 1989, Lady Gretton has run the family's Stapleford Park Estate, in Stapleford, Leicestershire.

Gretton has two children: Sarah Margaret Gretton (born 1971) who is married with two children; and John Lysander Gretton, 4th Baron Gretton (born 1975) who is married with one son.

She became a deputy lieutenant of Leicestershire in 2001, and was appointed Lord Lieutenant of Leicestershire on 1 February 2003. She became a Dame of the Order of St John in 2004.

The Gretton family also own the Stapleford Miniature Railway. The 2nd Lord Gretton installed the Stapleford Miniature Railway at Stapleford Park in 1958 which operated until 1982. The railway was mothballed when the park closed, but during the 1990s the FSMR friends supporting group was formed and the railway restored under the stewardship of Lady Gretton who is now president of the FSMR. Since 2012 the track has been used for the annual IMechE Railway Challenge.

Gretton became President of LOROS (a charity providing hospice care in Leicestershire) in 1999 with the railway opening twice yearly since 1995 in support of the hospice. She is also President of the Melton Mowbray and District Model Engineering Society and President of the Rural Community Council (Leicestershire & Rutland).

She has been a Member of the Committee of Somerby Parochial Church Council since 1991, Church Warden of All Saints Church Somerby 1992–1995, and has been a member of the Leicester Cathedral Council since 2003.

She retired as the Lord Lieutenant of Leicestershire in 2018 after 15 years in the role and was succeeded by Mike Kapur, Chairman of the National Space Centre which is in Leicestershire.

== Honours ==
In 2008, she was awarded honorary Doctor of Laws at the University of Leicester.

In 2012, she was awarded the degree Honorary Doctor of Letters by De Montfort University.

Gretton was appointed Dame Commander of the Royal Victorian Order (DCVO) in the 2017 Birthday Honours.

Honorary titles
| Preceded by Sir Timothy Brooks | Lord Lieutenant of Leicestershire; 2003–2018 | Succeeded by Mike Kapur |
