= John Gretton, 3rd Baron Gretton =

English peer (1941-1989)

John Henrik Gretton, 3rd Baron Gretton DL (9 February 1941 – 4 April 1989) was an English peer, owner of Stapleford Park in Leicestershire.

Gretton was born the son of The Hon. John Gretton, who became the 2nd Baron in 1947.

He was educated at Shrewsbury School. He was farming when on 17 October 1970 he married Jennifer Ann Moore, only daughter of Edmund Moore, of York. They lived at Holygate Farm, Stapleford, Leicestershire. They had two children; Sarah Margaret Gretton (born 1971) and John Lysander Gretton, who would later succeed his father as 4th Baron.

He was Deputy Lieutenant of Leicestershire in 1986.

He inherited the title as the 3rd Baron on the death of his father in 1982. Lord and Lady Gretton had issue:

- John Lysander Gretton, 4th Baron (17 Apr 1975- );
- Sarah Margaret (7 Dec 1971- ).

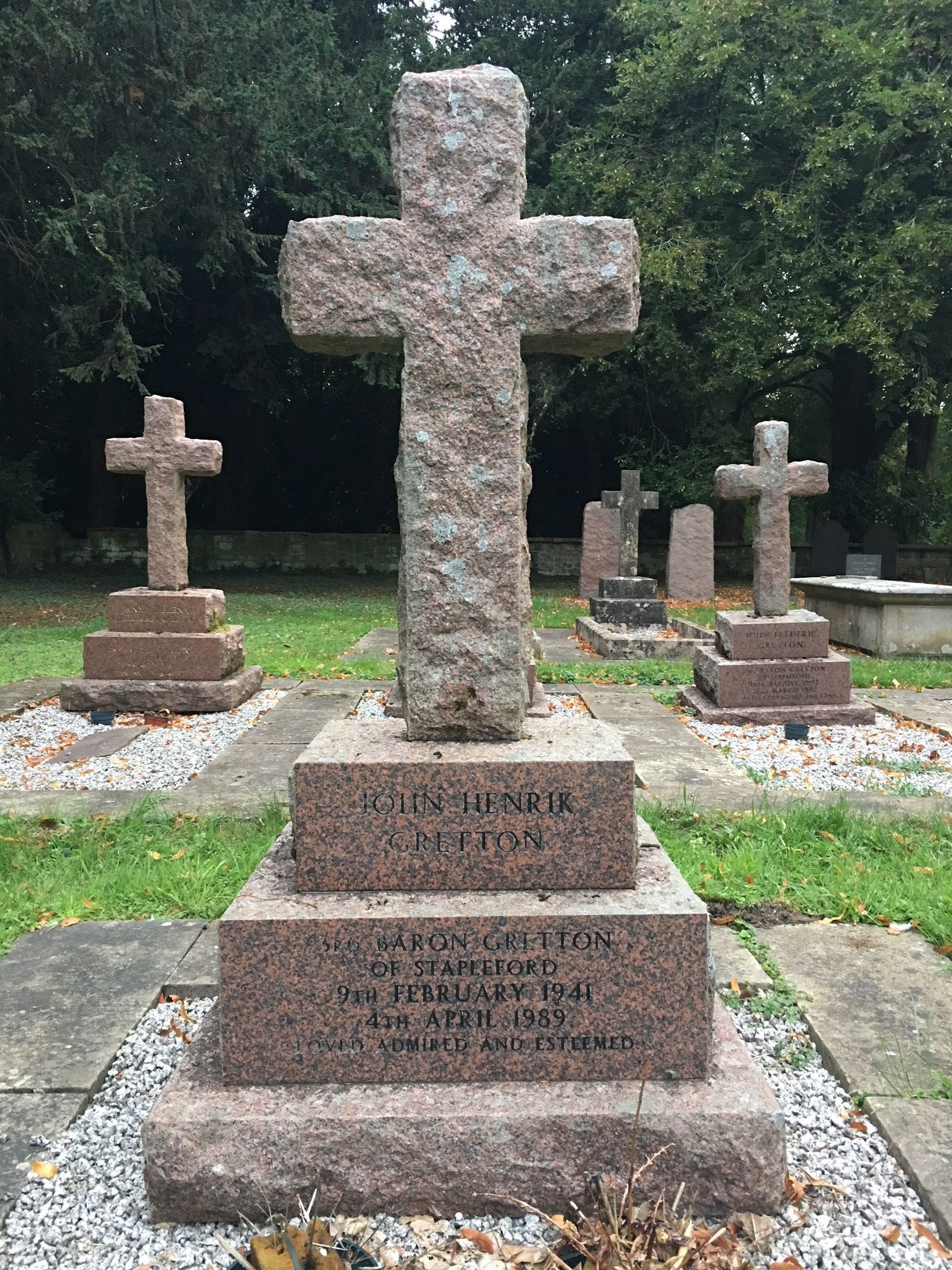
The grave of John Gretton, 3rd Baron Gretton, in the graveyard of St Mary Magdalene's Church, Stapleford

== Arms ==
Coat of arms of John Gretton, 3rd Baron Gretton
Notes Coat of arms of the Gretton family Coronet A coronet of a Baron Crest An Arm embowed Proper vested above the elbow Argent holding in the hand a torch erect fired and a sickle in bend sinister both Proper. Escutcheon Quarterly per fess indented Or and Gules in the second quarter an anchor in bend sinister of the first and in the third quarter an antique lamp also Or fired Proper. Supporters Dexter a bull Sable sinister a Chestnut Horse Proper each gorged with a chain pendent therefrom an anchor Or Motto Steadfast

Peerage of the United Kingdom
Preceded by John Gretton	Baron Gretton; 1982–1989	Succeeded by John Lysander Gretton
