= John Gretton, 2nd Baron Gretton =

British peer and politician (1902–1982)

John Frederic Gretton, 2nd Baron Gretton OBE (15 August 1902 – 26 March 1982), was a British peer and Conservative Member of Parliament.

Gretton was the son of John Gretton, 1st Baron Gretton, and Hon. Maud Helen de Moleyns, daughter of Dayrolles Blakeney Eveleigh-de-Moleyns, 4th Baron Ventry. Lord Gretton was educated at Eton.

He was elected to the House of Commons for Burton in 1943 (succeeding his father), a seat he held until 1945. Two years later he succeeded his father as second Baron Gretton and entered the House of Lords.

Lord Gretton married on 6 May 1930 Anna Helena, known as Margaret, elder daughter of Captain Henrik Loeffler, of 51 Grosvenor Square, London. She was a JP in 1943 for Staffordshire and lived at the Rectory, Ufford, near Stamford, Lincolnshire.

- John Henrik Gretton, 3rd Baron
- Anthony David Erik (25 Jul 1945 – 13 Nov 1982)
- Mary Ann Maud Sigrid (5 Jan 1939- )
- Elizabeth Margaret (25 Jul 1945- )

== In film ==
In 1958, Stapleford Miniature Railway was constructed by the 2nd Lord Gretton in Stapleford Park, as a public attraction. It also included a lion reserve. The park and house became a tourist attraction in the 1960's and '70's. It closed in 1982, and the house was sold. It was converted into a country hotel. The railway and parkland are still owned by the Gretton family, and they open for charity a few times a year. In 1964, British Pathé filmed 'Stately Home Railway' there, which featured the 2nd. Lord.

He died in March 1982, aged 79, and was succeeded in the barony by his son John Henrik Gretton.

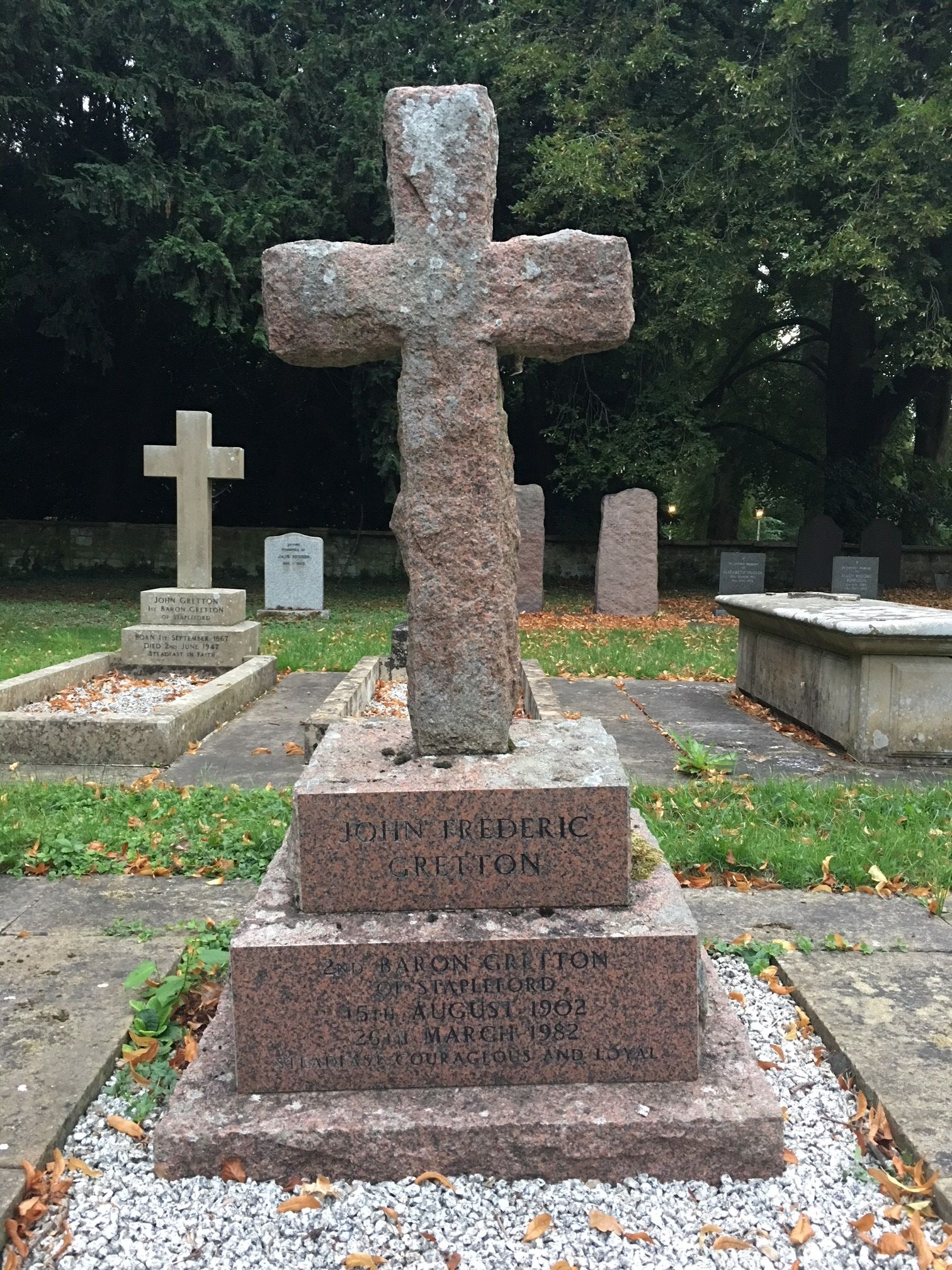
The grave of John Gretton, 2nd Baron Gretton, in the graveyard of St Mary Magdalene's Church, Stapleford

== Arms ==
Coat of arms of John Gretton, 2nd Baron Gretton
Notes Coat of arms of the Gretton family Coronet A coronet of a Baron Crest An Arm embowed Proper vested above the elbow Argent holding in the hand a torch erect fired and a sickle in bend sinister both Proper. Escutcheon Quarterly per fess indented Or and Gules in the second quarter an anchor in bend sinister of the first and in the third quarter an antique lamp also Or fired Proper. Supporters Dexter a bull Sable sinister a Chestnut Horse Proper each gorged with a chain pendent therefrom an anchor Or Motto Steadfast

Parliament of the United Kingdom
Preceded by John Gretton	Member of Parliament for Burton; 1943–1945	Succeeded by Arthur W. Lyne
Peerage of the United Kingdom
Preceded by John Gretton	Baron Gretton; 1947–1982	Succeeded by John Gretton
Other offices
Preceded by Maurice Arthur Pryor	President of the Institute of Brewing; 1960 – 1962	Succeeded by Francis Northey Richardson
