= William Cecil, 1st Baron Burghley =

English statesman and chief adviser to Queen Elizabeth I (1520–1598)

The Right Honourable The Lord Burghley KG PC
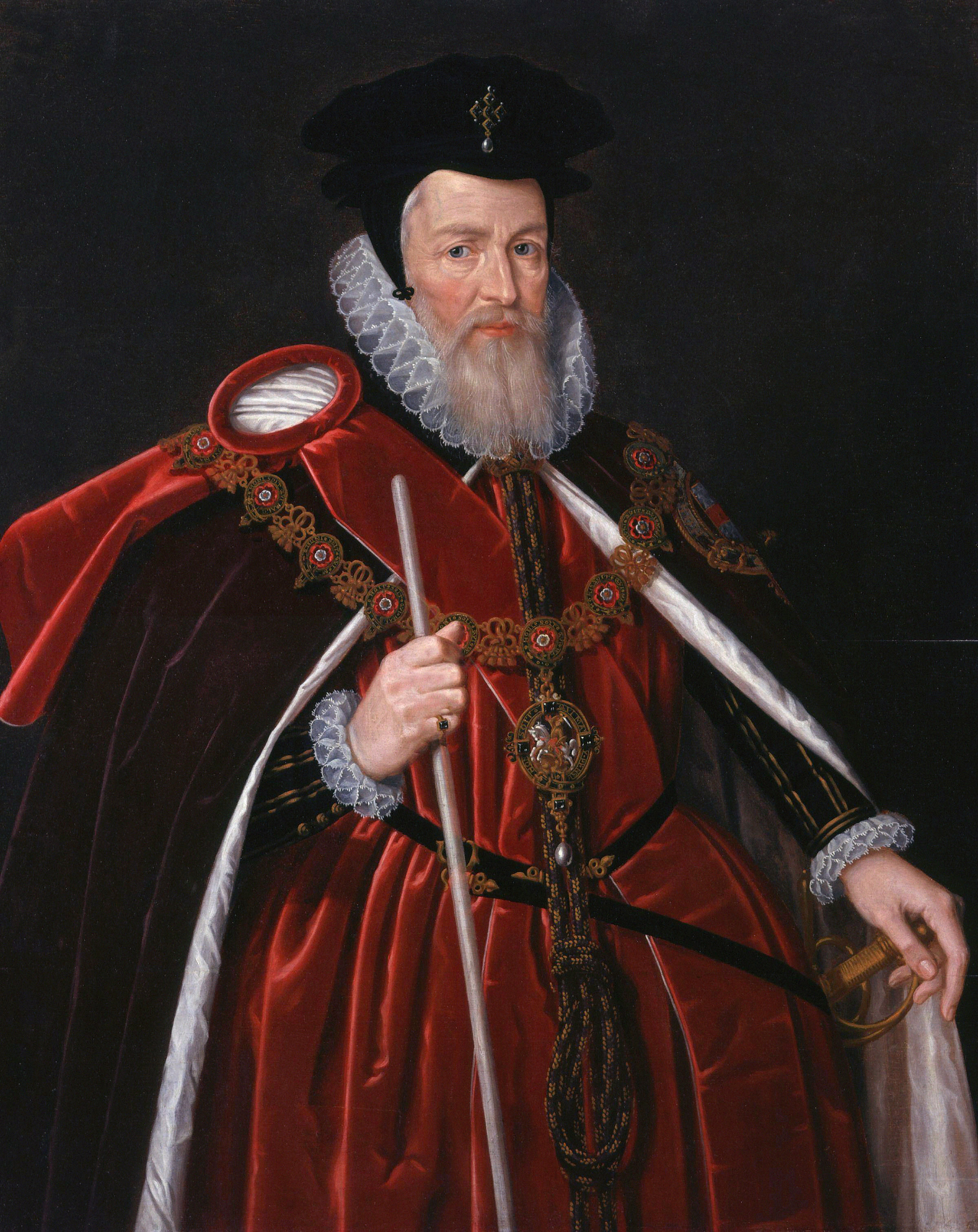
- Portrait attributed to Marcus Gheeraerts the Younger

Lord High Treasurer
- In office July 1572 – 4 August 1598
- Monarch: Elizabeth I
- Preceded by: The Marquess of Winchester
- Succeeded by: The Earl of Dorset

Lord Privy Seal
- In office 1590–1598
- Monarch: Elizabeth I
- Preceded by: Sir Francis Walsingham
- Succeeded by: Sir Robert Cecil
- In office 1571–1572
- Monarch: Elizabeth I
- Preceded by: Sir Nicholas Bacon
- Succeeded by: The Lord Howard of Effingham

Secretary of State
- In office 22 November 1558 – 13 July 1572
- Monarch: Elizabeth I
- Preceded by: John Boxall
- Succeeded by: Thomas Smith
- In office 5 September 1550 – 19 July 1553
- Monarchs: Edward VI; Jane
- Preceded by: Nicholas Wotton
- Succeeded by: John Cheke

Personal details
- Born: William Cecil; 13 September 1520 Bourne, Lincolnshire; Kingdom of England
- Died: 4 August 1598 (aged 77) Cecil House; Westminster, London; Kingdom of England
- Resting place: St Martin's Church; Stamford, Lincolnshire; United Kingdom; 52°38′56″N 0°28′39″W
- Spouse(s): Mary Cheke (d. 1543) Mildred Cooke (m. 1546; died 1589)
- Children: Thomas Cecil, 1st Earl of Exeter; Frances Cecil; Anne de Vere, Countess of Oxford; Robert Cecil, 1st Earl of Salisbury; Elizabeth Cecil
- Parent(s): Sir Richard Cecil; Jane Heckington
- Education: St John's College, Cambridge

Quartered arms of William Cecil, 1st Baron Burghley, KG

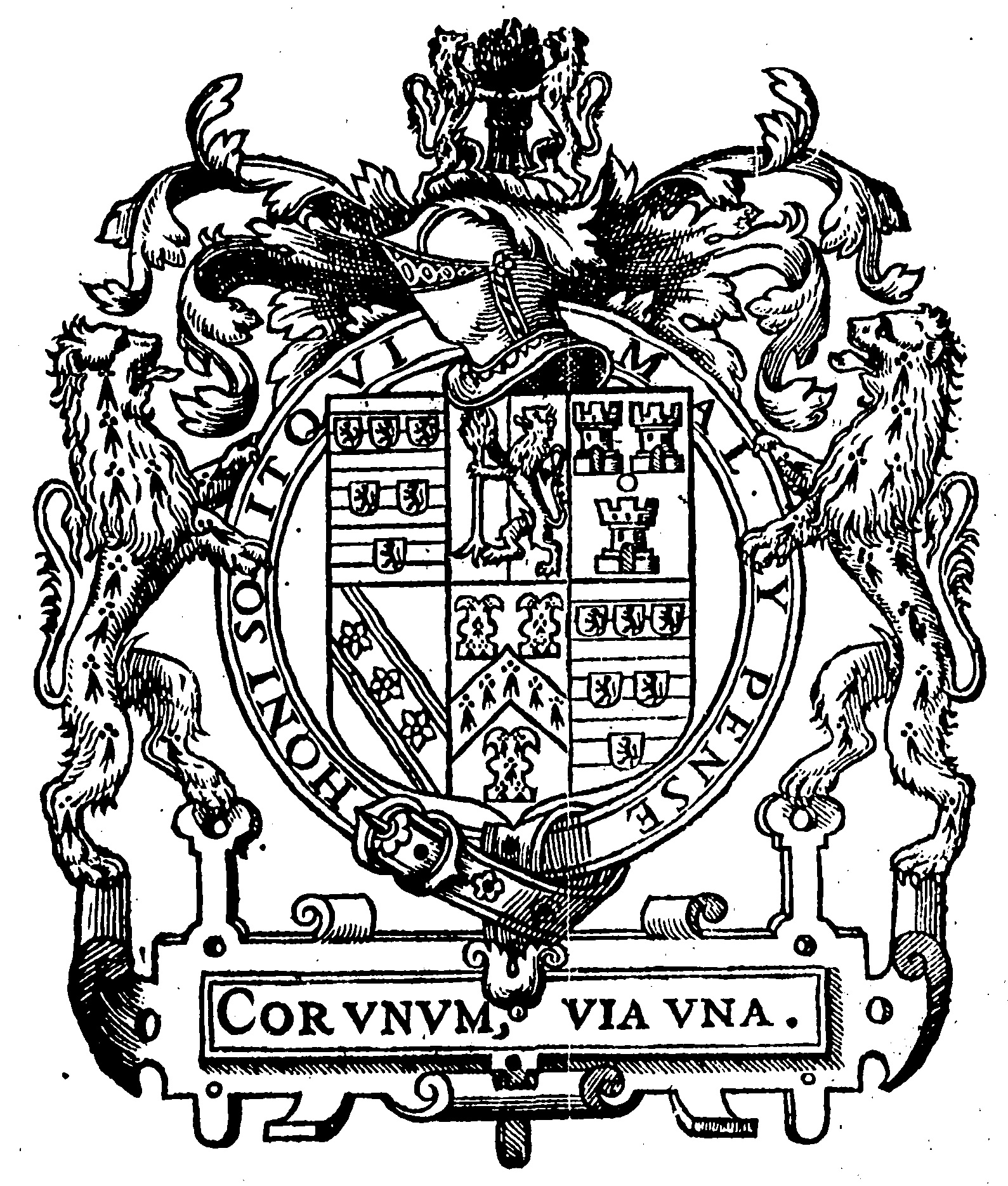
Coat of arms of William Cecil as found in John Gerard's The herball or Generall historie of plantes (1597)

William Cecil, 1st Baron Burghley (13 September 1520 – 4 August 1598), was an English statesman, the chief adviser of Queen Elizabeth I for most of her reign, twice Secretary of State (1550–1553 and 1558–1572) and Lord High Treasurer from 1572. In his description in the Encyclopædia Britannica Eleventh Edition, A. F. Pollard wrote, "From 1558 for forty years the biography of Cecil is almost indistinguishable from that of Elizabeth and from the history of England." He was raised to the peerage as Baron Burghley in February 1571.

Cecil set as the main goal of English policy the creation of a united and Protestant British Isles. His methods were to complete the control of Ireland, and to forge an alliance with Scotland. Protection from invasion required a powerful Royal Navy. While he was not fully successful, his successors agreed with his goals. In 1587, Cecil persuaded the Queen to order the execution of the Roman Catholic Mary, Queen of Scots, after she was implicated in a plot to assassinate Elizabeth.

He was the father of Robert Cecil, 1st Earl of Salisbury, and founder of the Cecil dynasty (marquesses of Exeter and of Salisbury), which has produced many politicians, including two prime ministers.

== Early life ==
Cecil was born in Bourne, Lincolnshire, at what is now the Burghley Arms, in 1520, the son of Sir Richard Cecil, owner of the Burghley estate (near Stamford, Lincolnshire), and his wife, Jane Heckington.

Pedigrees, elaborated by Cecil himself with the help of William Camden the antiquary, associated him with the Welsh Cecils or Seisyllts of Allt-Yr-Ynys, Walterstone, on the border of Herefordshire and Monmouthshire. Cecil is an anglicisation of the Welsh Seisyllt. Lord Burghley acknowledged that the family was from the Welsh Marches in a family pedigree painted at Theobalds.

The Lord Treasurer's grandfather, David Cecil, had moved to Stamford. David Cecil secured the favour of the first Tudor king, Henry VII, to whom he was yeoman of the chamber. He was elected Member of Parliament for Stamford five times, between 1504 and 1523. He was Sergeant-of-Arms to Henry VIII in 1526, Sheriff of Northamptonshire in 1532, and a justice of the peace for Rutland. He, according to Burghley's enemies, kept the best inn in Stamford. His eldest son, Richard, Yeoman of the Wardrobe (died 1554), married Jane, daughter of William Heckington of Bourne, and was father of three daughters and the future Lord Burghley.

William, the only son, was put to school at The King's School, Grantham, and then Stamford School, which he later saved and endowed. In May 1535, at the age of fourteen, he went to St John's College, Cambridge, where he was brought into contact with the foremost scholars of the time, Roger Ascham and John Cheke, and acquired an unusual knowledge of Greek. He also acquired the affections of Cheke's sister, Mary, and was in 1541 removed by his father to Gray's Inn, without having taken a degree, as was common at the time for those not intending to enter the Church. The precaution proved useless and four months later Cecil committed one of the rare rash acts of his life in marrying Mary Cheke. The only child of this marriage, Thomas, the future Earl of Exeter, was born in May 1542, and in February 1543 Cecil's first wife died. On 21 December 1546 he married Mildred Cooke, who was ranked by Ascham with Lady Jane Grey as one of the two most learned ladies in the kingdom, (aside from another of Ascham's pupils, Elizabeth Tudor, who was later Elizabeth I) and whose sister, Anne, was the wife of Sir Nicholas Bacon and mother of Sir Francis Bacon.

== Early career ==
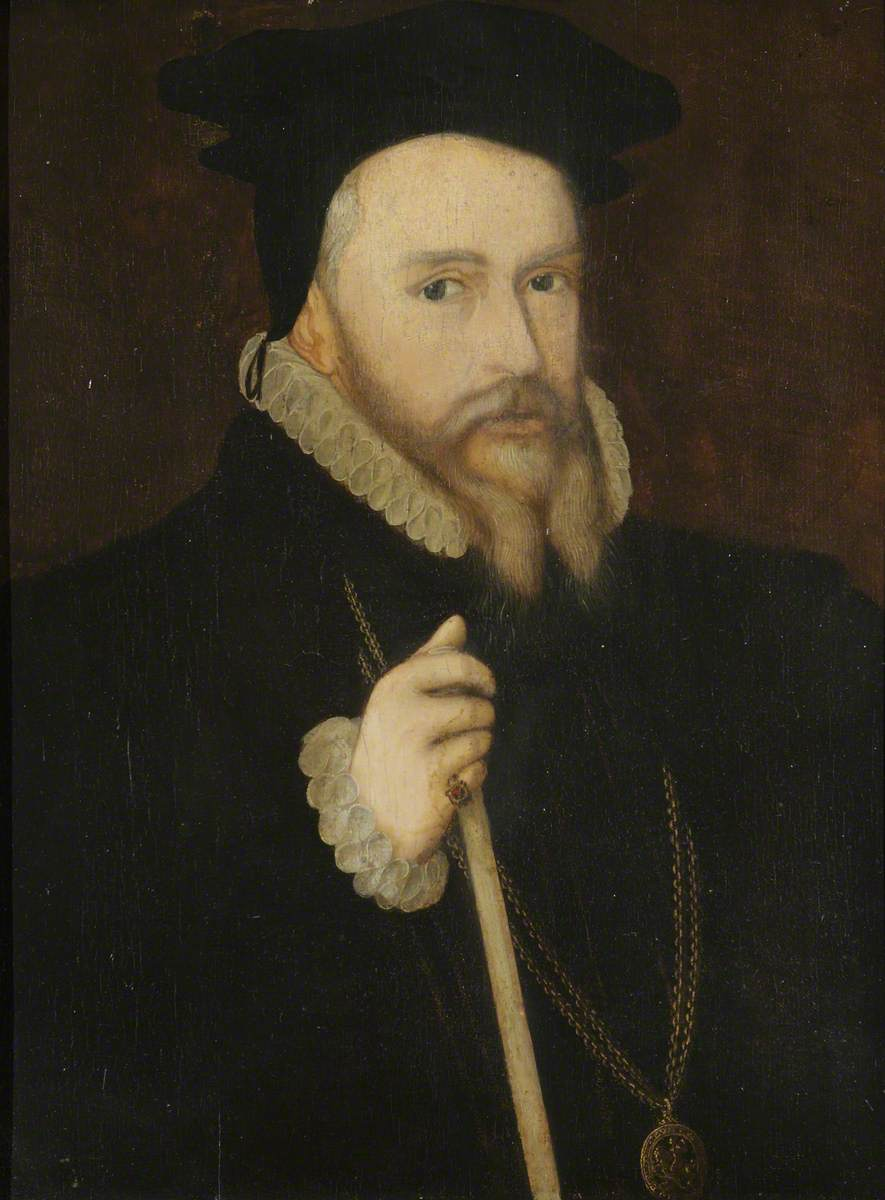
Portrait of William Cecil, c. after 1570

William Cecil's early career was spent in the service of the Duke of Somerset (a brother of the late queen, Jane Seymour), who was Lord Protector during the early years of the reign of his nephew, the young Edward VI. Cecil accompanied Somerset on his Pinkie campaign of 1547 (part of the "Rough Wooing"), being one of the two Judges of the Marshalsea. The other was William Patten, who states that both he and Cecil began to write independent accounts of the campaign, and that Cecil generously contributed his notes for Patten's narrative, The Expedition into Scotland.

Cecil, according to his autobiographical notes, sat in Parliament in 1543; but his name does not occur in the imperfect parliamentary returns until 1547, when he was elected for the family borough of Stamford. In 1548, he was described as the Protector's Master of Requests, which apparently means that he was clerk or registrar of the court of requests which Somerset, possibly at Hugh Latimer's instigation, illegally set up in Somerset House to hear poor men's complaints. He also seems to have acted as private secretary to the Protector, and was in some danger at the time of the Protector's fall in October 1549. The lords opposed to Somerset ordered his detention on 10 October, and in November he was in the Tower of London.

Cecil ingratiated himself with John Dudley, then Earl of Warwick, and after less than three months he was out of the Tower. On 5 September 1550 Cecil was sworn in as one of King Edward's two secretaries of state. In April 1551, Cecil became chancellor of the Order of the Garter. But service under Warwick (by now the Duke of Northumberland) carried some risk, and decades later in his diary, Cecil recorded his release in the phrase "ex misero aulico factus liber et mei juris" ("I was freed from this miserable court").

To protect the Protestant government from the accession of a Catholic queen, Northumberland forced King Edward's lawyers to create an instrument setting aside the Third Succession Act on 15 June 1553. (The document, which Edward titled "My Devise for the Succession", barred both Elizabeth and Mary, the remaining children of Henry VIII, from the throne, in favour of Lady Jane Grey.) Cecil resisted for a while, in a letter to his wife, he wrote: "Seeing great perils threatened upon us by the likeness of the time, I do make choice to avoid the perils of God's displeasure." However, at Edward's royal command he signed, not only the devise, but also the bond among the conspirators and the letters from the council to Mary Tudor of 9 June 1553.

Years afterwards, he pretended that he had only signed the devise as a witness, but in his apology to Queen Mary I, he did not venture to allege so flimsy an excuse; he preferred to lay stress on the extent to which he succeeded in shifting the responsibility on to the shoulders of his brother-in-law, Sir John Cheke, and other friends, and on his intrigues to frustrate the Queen to whom he had sworn allegiance.

There is no doubt that Cecil saw which way the wind was blowing, and disliked Northumberland's scheme; but he had not the courage to resist the duke to his face. As soon as the duke had set out to meet Mary, however, Cecil became the most active intriguer against him, and to these efforts, of which he laid a full account before Queen Mary, he mainly owed his immunity. He had, moreover, had no part in the divorce of Catherine of Aragon or in the humiliation of Mary during Henry's reign, and he made no scruple about conforming to the Catholic reaction. He went to Mass, confessed, and in no particular official capacity went to meet Cardinal Pole on his return to England in December 1554, again accompanying him to Calais in May 1555.

William Cecil was elected to Parliament as knight of the shire for Lincolnshire in 1553 (probably), 1555 and 1559 and for Northamptonshire in 1563."

In January of that year, he wrote to Sir Thomas Smith: "The Parliament is begun and I trust will be short, for matters of moment to pass are not many, reviving of some old laws for penalties of some felonies and the grant of a subsidy. I think somewhat will be attempted to ascertain the realm of a successor to this crown, but I fear the unwillingness of her Majesty to have such a person known will stay the matter."

It was rumoured in December 1554 that Cecil would succeed Sir William Petre as Secretary of State, an office which, with his chancellorship of the Garter, he had lost on Mary's accession to the throne. Probably the Queen had more to do with this rumour than Cecil, though he is said to have opposed, in the parliament of 1555 (in which he represented Lincolnshire), a bill for the confiscation of the estates of the Protestant refugees. The story, even as told by his biographer, does not represent Cecil's conduct as having been very courageous; and it is more revealing that he found no seat in the parliament of 1558, for which Mary had directed the return of "discreet and good Catholic members".

== Reign of Elizabeth ==
The Duke of Northumberland had employed Cecil in the administration of the lands of Princess Elizabeth. Before Mary died he was a member of the "old flock of Hatfield", and from the first, the new Queen relied on Cecil. He was the cousin of Blanche Parry, Elizabeth's longest serving gentlewoman and close confidante. Elizabeth appointed Cecil as Secretary of State. His tight control over the finances of the Crown, leadership of the Privy Council, and the creation of a capable intelligence service under the direction of Francis Walsingham made him a highly important minister for the majority of Elizabeth's reign.

=== Foreign policy ===
Dawson argues that Cecil's long-term goal was a united and Protestant British Isles, an objective to be achieved by completing the conquest of Ireland and by creating an Anglo-Scottish alliance. With the land border with Scotland safe, the main burden of defence would fall upon the Royal Navy, Cecil proposed to strengthen and revitalise the Navy, making it the centrepiece of English power. He did obtain a firm Anglo-Scottish alliance reflecting the common religion and shared interests of the two countries, as well as an agreement that offered the prospect of a successful conquest of Ireland. However, his strategy ultimately failed. His idea that England's safety required a united British Isles became an axiom of English policy by the 17th century.

Though a Protestant, Cecil was not a religious purist; he aided the Protestant Huguenots and Dutch just enough to keep them going in the struggles which warded danger from England's shores. However, Cecil never developed that passionate aversion to decided measures which became a second nature to Elizabeth. His intervention in Scotland in 1559–1560 showed that he could strike hard when necessary; and his action over the execution of Mary, Queen of Scots, proved that he was willing to take on responsibilities from which the Queen shrank.

Generally he was in favour of more decided intervention on behalf of continental Protestants than Elizabeth would have liked, but it is not always easy to ascertain the advice he gave. He left endless memoranda lucidly (nevertheless sometimes bordering on the ridiculous) setting forth the pros and cons of every course of action; but there are few indications of the line which he actually recommended when it came to a decision. How far he was personally responsible for the Anglican Settlement, the Poor Laws, and the foreign policy of the reign, remains to a large extent a matter of conjecture. However, it is most likely that Cecil's views carried the day in the politics of Elizabethan England. Hilaire Belloc contends that Cecil was the de facto ruler of England during his tenure as Secretary; and that in instances where his and Elizabeth's wills diverged, it was Cecil's will that was imposed.

Leimon and Parker argue that Cecil was the principal protector of Edward Stafford, the English ambassador to Paris and a paid spy who helped the Spanish at the time of the Spanish Armada. However, they do not claim Cecil knew of Stafford's treason.

=== Domestic politics ===
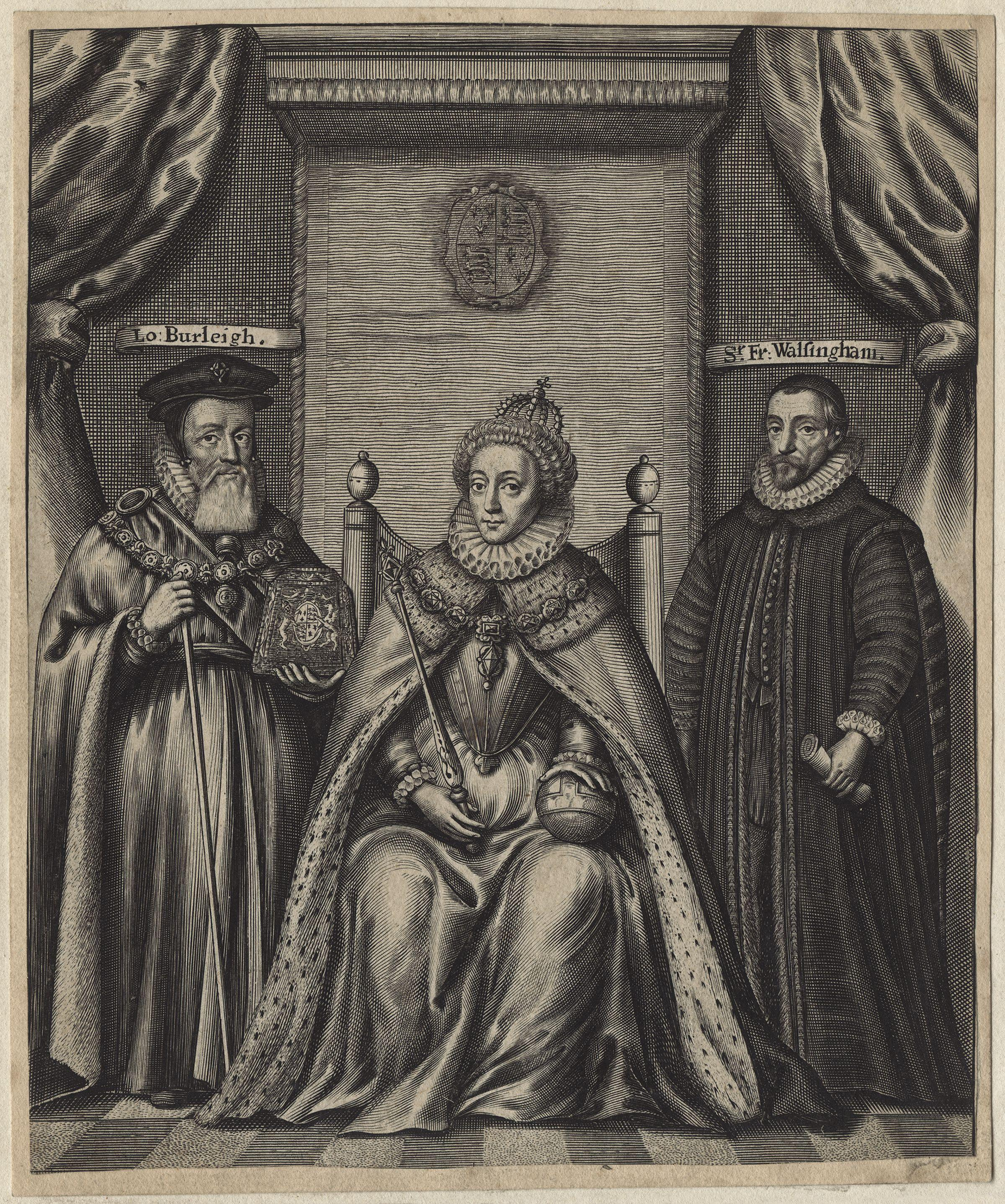
Engraving of Queen Elizabeth I, William Cecil and Sir Francis Walsingham, by William Faithorne, 1655

William Cecil's share in the Religious Settlement of 1559 was considerable, and it coincided fairly with his own Anglican religious views. Like the mass of the nation, he grew more Protestant as time wore on; he was happier to persecute Catholics than Puritans; and he had no love for ecclesiastical jurisdiction. His prosecution of the English Catholics made him a recurring character in the "evil counsellor polemics", written by Catholic exiles across the channel. In these pamphlets, polemicists painted a black picture of Burghley as a corrupting influence over the queen. "The Queen will listen to none but unto him", exiled Catholic intelligencer Richard Verstegan wrote, "and somtymes, she is faine to come to his bedsyde to entreat him in some-things." He warmly remonstrated with John Whitgift, the Anglican Archbishop of Canterbury, over his persecuting Articles of 1583. The finest encomium was passed on him by the queen herself, when she said, "This judgment I have of you, that you will not be corrupted with any manner of gifts, and that you will be faithful to the state."

=== Economic policy ===
William Cecil sought to ensure that policy was commensurate with the royal finances, which often led him advocating a cautious policy. His economic ideas were influenced by the Commonwealthmen of Edward VI's reign: he believed in the necessity of safeguarding the social hierarchy, the just price and the moral duties due to labour. In his economic policy he was motivated by a variety of factors, including those of national independence and self-sufficiency, as well as seeking to balance the interests of the Crown and the subject. Cecil did not believe that economics and politics were separate or that there was a dichotomy between power and plenty. One of his biographers asserted that, for Burghley, "power was for defence from external enemies; plenty for security at home. Cecil pursued both power and plenty. They were the foreign and domestic aspects of his economic nationalism". He deplored the reliance on "foreign corn" and during an economic depression sought to ensure employment due to his fears of "tumults". Cecil used patronage to ensure the loyalty of the nobility.

=== In Parliament ===
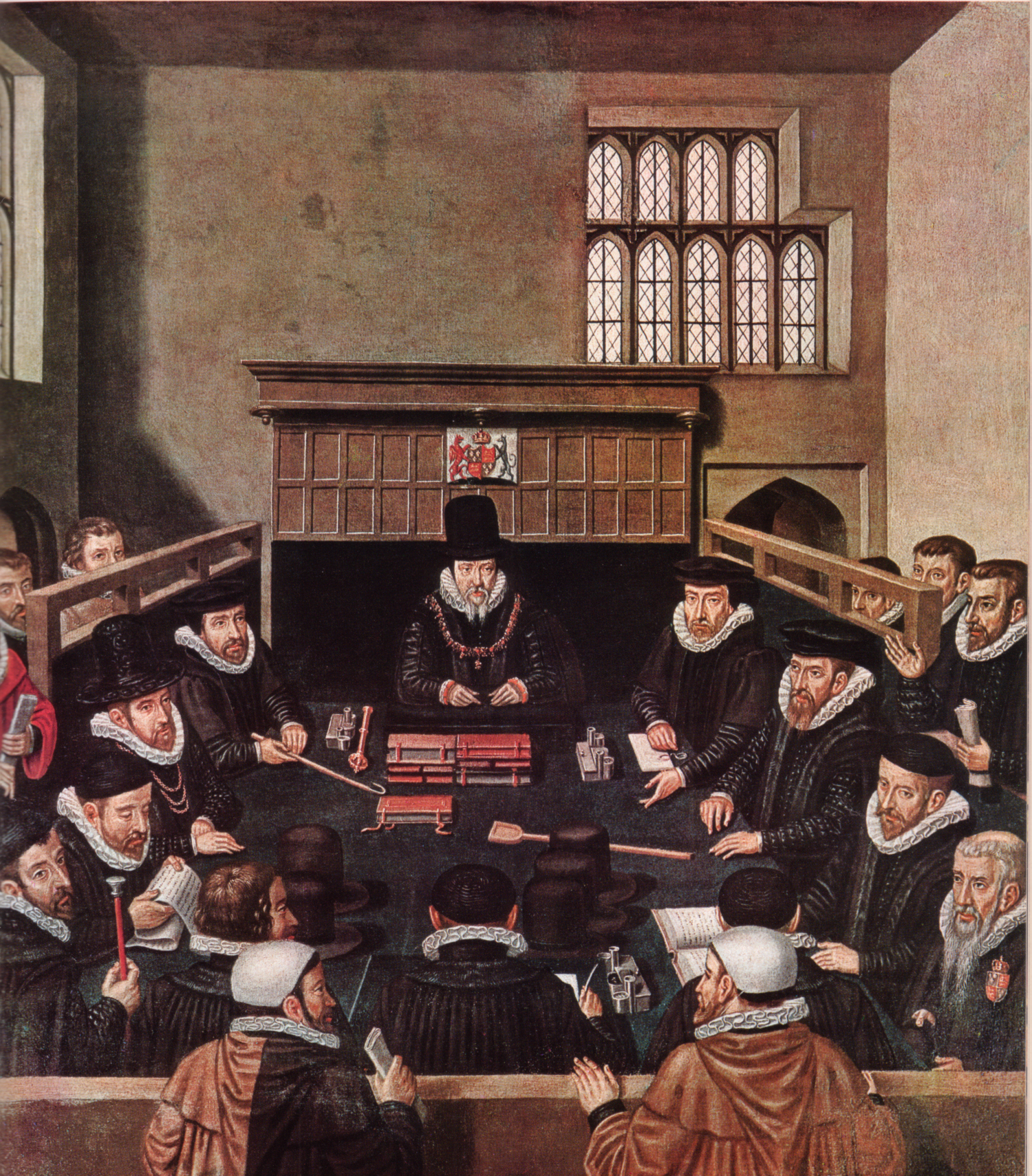
Cecil presiding over the Court of Wards

William Cecil represented Lincolnshire in the Parliament of 1555 and 1559, and Northamptonshire in that of 1563, and he took an active part in the proceedings of the House of Commons until his elevation to the peerage; but there seems no good evidence for the story that he was proposed as Speaker in 1563. In January 1561, he was given the lucrative office of Master of the Court of Wards and Liveries in succession to Sir Thomas Parry. As Master of the Court of Wards, Cecil supervised the raising and education of wealthy, aristocratic boys whose fathers had died before they reached maturity. These included: the 17th Earl of Oxford; the 3rd Earl of Southampton; the 2nd Earl of Essex; and the 5th Earl of Rutland. He is widely credited with reforming an institution notorious for its corruption, but the extent of his reforms has been disputed by some scholars.

In February 1559, he was elected Chancellor of Cambridge University in succession to Cardinal Pole; he was created M.A. of that university on the occasion of Elizabeth's visit in 1564, and M.A. of Oxford on a similar occasion in 1566. He was the first Chancellor of the University of Dublin, between 1592 and 1598.

On 25 February 1571, Queen Elizabeth elevated him as Baron Burghley. That Cecil continued to act as Secretary of State after his elevation illustrates the growing importance of the office, which under his son became a secretary of the ship of state. In 1572 Cecil privately admonished the queen for her "doubtful dealing with the Queen of Scots". He made a strong attack on everything he thought Elizabeth had done wrong as queen. In his view, Mary had to be executed because she had become a rallying cause for Catholics and played into the hands of the Spanish and of the pope, who excommunicated Elizabeth in 1570 and sent in Jesuits to organise a Catholic underground. Following the Harleyford Conference of July 1586 these missionaries would set up a highly effective underground system for the transport and support of priests arriving from the Continent. Elizabeth's indecision was maddening; finally in 1587 Elizabeth had Mary executed.

=== Treasurer ===
In 1572, Lord Winchester, who had been Lord High Treasurer under Edward, Mary and Elizabeth, died. His vacant post was offered to Robert Dudley, 1st Earl of Leicester, who declined it and proposed Burghley, stating that the latter was the more suitable candidate because of his greater "learning and knowledge". The new Lord Treasurer's hold over the queen strengthened with the years.

== Burghley, Cecil House and Theobalds ==
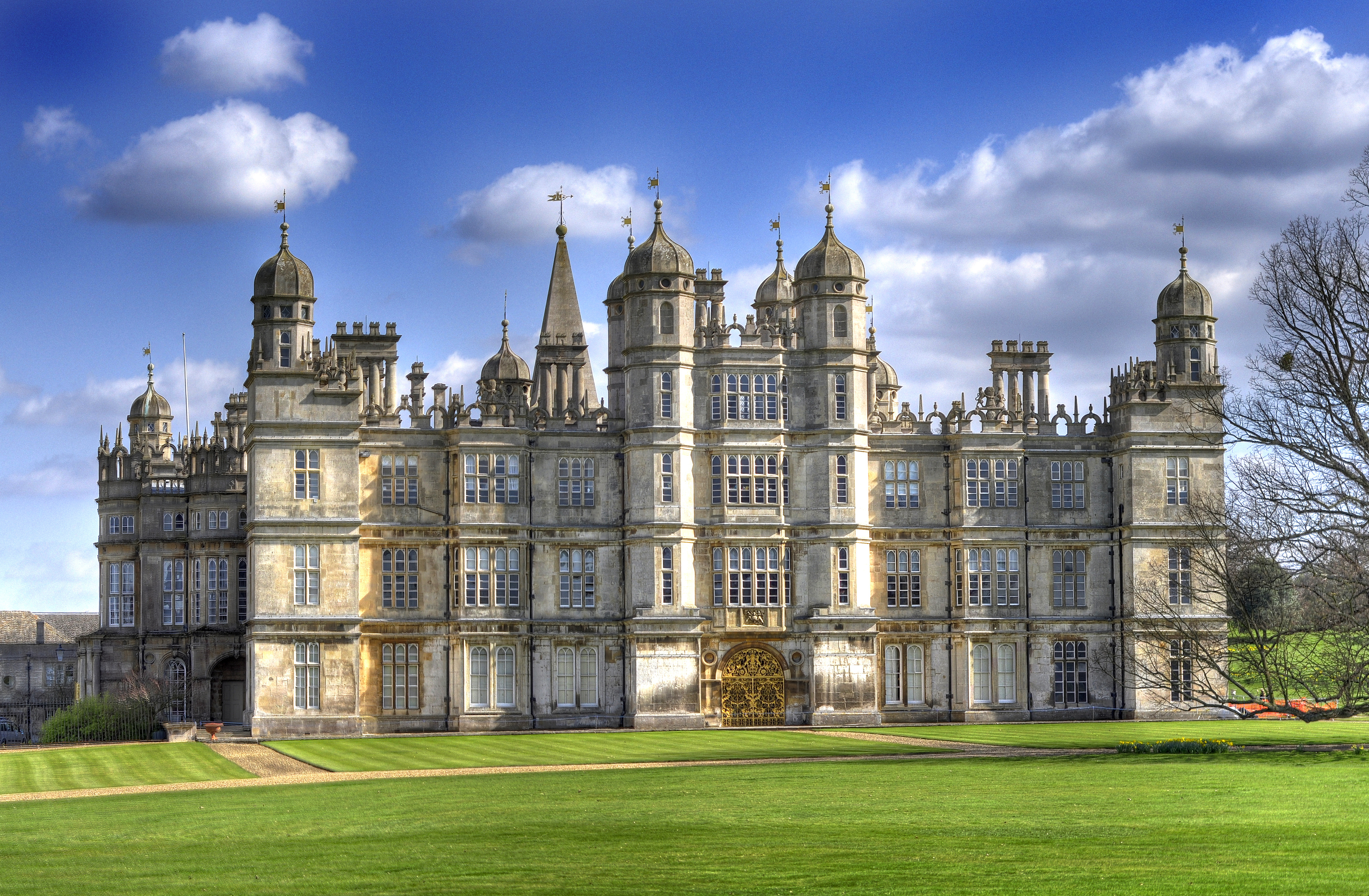
Burghley House

Burghley House, near the town of Stamford, was built for Cecil, between 1555 and 1587, and modelled on the privy lodgings of Richmond Palace. It was subsequently the residence of his descendants, the earls and marquesses of Exeter. The house is one of the principal examples of 16th-century Elizabethan architecture, reflecting the prominence of its founder, and the lucrative wool trade of the Cecil estates.

Cecil House was built as his London residence, an expansion of an existing building. (Note: The house, on the site of the rectory of St Clement Danes, was built by Sir Thomas Palmer, disgraced for his support of Lady Jane Grey and executed with John Dudley, 1st Duke of Northumberland in 1553.) Queen Elizabeth I supped with him there, in July 1561, "before my house was fully finished", Cecil recorded in his diary, calling the place "my rude new cottage." Inherited by his elder son, Thomas Cecil, 1st Earl of Exeter, it was known as "Exeter House".

A new Theobalds House in Cheshunt was built between 1564 and 1585 by the order of Cecil, intending to build a mansion partly to demonstrate his increasingly dominant status at the royal court, and to provide a palace fine enough to accommodate the Queen on her visits. The Queen visited there eight times, between 1572 and 1596. An entertainment for Elizabeth, the Hermit's Welcome at Theobalds in May 1591 alluded to Burghley's retirement from public life.

== Private life ==
Cecil was married twice and had several children. He was a book collector and antiquarian with a particular interest in heraldry and genealogy. He was also an active builder and patron of architecture and gardening, commissioning extensive work on Burghley House and Theobalds; his son later exchanged Theobalds for Hatfield House. Cecil wrote more than 128 letters to his son Robert Cecil over the course of his life, containing words of guidance and perseverance. The collection of letters show the close direction and counsel he gave his son in seeking and obtaining the office of principal secretary, 1593–1598. They describe the task of receiving and crafting a wide and large array of papers on behalf of Queen Elizabeth I and her Privy Council; finance, administration, foreign policy, and religion figure prominently, as does the shift from continental war to Ireland. These letters reveal the intimate relationship between the father and son; Burghley's care for his family, his thoughts of death, and a unique record of illness and old age are framed by his political and spiritual anxieties for the future of the Queen and her realms.

== Death ==
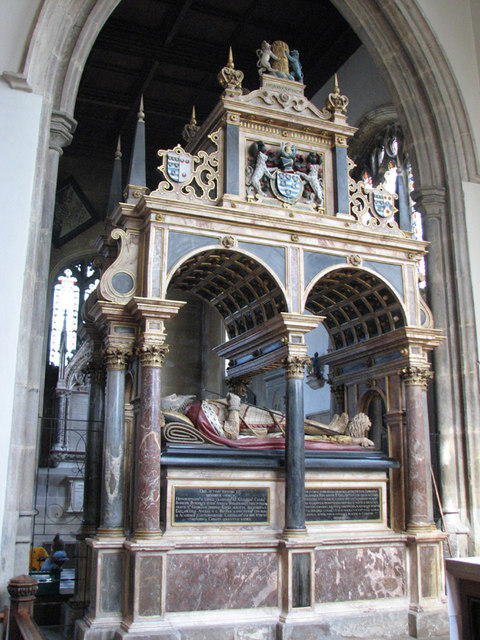
Tomb of William Cecil in St Martin's Church, Stamford

Burghley collapsed (possibly from a stroke or heart attack) in 1598. Before he died, Robert, his only surviving son by his second wife, was ready to step into his shoes as the Queen's principal adviser. Having survived all his children except Robert and Thomas, Burghley died at his London residence, Cecil House on 4 August 1598, and was buried in St Martin's Church, Stamford.

=== Descendants ===
William Cecil first married Mary Cheke (Cheek), daughter of Peter Cheke of Cambridge and Agnes Duffield (and sister of John Cheke), and they had issue:

- Thomas Cecil, 1st Earl of Exeter (born 5 May 1542), who inherited the Barony of Burghley upon the death of his father, and was later created Earl of Exeter.

Secondly, he married Mildred Cooke, eldest daughter of Sir Anthony Cooke of Gidea, Essex and Anne Fitzwilliam, and they had the following issue:

- Frances Cecil (born c. 1556)
- Anne Cecil (born 5 December 1556), who was the first wife of Edward de Vere, 17th Earl of Oxford, and, before marriage, served as a Maid of Honour to Queen Elizabeth I.
- Sir Robert Cecil (born 1 June 1563), who inherited his father's political mantle, taking on the role of Chief Minister, and arranging a smooth transfer of power to the Stuart administration under King James VI and I. He was created Baron Cecil, Viscount Cranborne, and finally Earl of Salisbury.
- Elizabeth Cecil (born 1 July 1564), who married William Wentworth of Nettlestead (c. 1555–1582), eldest son of Thomas Wentworth, 2nd Baron Wentworth.

Cecil's descendants include the Marquesses of Exeter, descended from his elder son Thomas; and the Marquesses of Salisbury, descended from his younger son Robert. One of the latter branch, Robert Cecil, 3rd Marquess of Salisbury (1830–1903), served three times as Prime Minister, under Queen Victoria and her son, King Edward VII. The latter's nephew Arthur Balfour, who succeeded Salisbury as Prime Minister, was also a descendant. The present head of the family, Robert Gascoyne-Cecil, 7th Marquess of Salisbury, was Leader of the House of Lords from 1994 to 1997.

== Public conduct ==
Albert Pollard, in his article on Cecil in the Encyclopedia Britannica, wrote:

"William Cecil's public conduct does not present itself in quite so amiable a light. As his predecessor, Lord Winchester, said of himself, he was sprung "from the willow rather than the oak". Neither Cecil nor Lord Winchester were men to suffer for the sake of obstinate convictions. The interest of the state was the supreme consideration for Burghley, and to it he had no hesitation in sacrificing individual consciences. He frankly disbelieved in toleration; "that state", he said, "could never be in safety where there was a toleration of two religions. For there is no enmity so great as that for religion; and therefore they that differ in the service of their God can never agree in the service of their country". With a maxim such as this, it was easy for him to maintain that Elizabeth's coercive measures were political and not religious. To say that he was Machiavellian is meaningless, for every statesman is so, more or less; especially in the 16th century men preferred efficiency to principle. On the other hand, principles are valueless without law and order; and Burghley's craft and subtlety prepared a security in which principles might find some scope."

== Sir Nicholas White ==
The most prolonged of Cecil's surviving personal correspondences, lasting from 1566 until 1590, is with Sir Nicholas White, an Irish judge. It is contained in the State Papers Ireland 63 and Lansdowne MS. 102, but receives hardly a mention in the literature on Cecil.

White had been a tutor to Cecil's children during his law student days at Lincoln's Inn, and the correspondence suggests that he was held in lasting affection by the family. In the end, White fell into a Dublin controversy over the confessions of an intriguing priest, which threatened the authority of the Queen's deputised government in Ireland; out of caution, Cecil withdrew his longstanding protection, and White was imprisoned in London and died soon after.

White's most remarked-upon service for Cecil is his report on his visit to Mary, Queen of Scots, in 1569, during the early years of her imprisonment. It was an acrimonious encounter in which White angrily refuted Mary's contention that Elizabeth was treating her harshly. However, he admitted in his subsequent letter to Cecil that despite his hostility towards Mary, he had found her to be somewhat alluring and advised that she be kept under strict confinement for fear that she would have a similar impact on others. Elizabeth was jealous of her Scottish rival and, although he was at pains to stress that Mary in no way surpassed her in charm and beauty, White could well have forfeited his recently acquired favour had this relation been communicated to his queen; Cecil seems to have kept it from his royal mistress.

In February 1581, White demonstrated his independence in council, refusing to sign a letter to the Queen regarding Sir Nicholas Malby's actions in the Munster rebellion since he was away in England during the deliberations of the meeting. Again, on 28 August 1582, White was accused of withholding his signature to conciliar deliberations on the actions of the deputy during the Pale rebellion. He continued to demonstrate his valuable insights to Burghley in regular correspondence throughout the period, including letters of December 1581 on the miseries of war, the need for temperate government, and his fear that the wild Irish were glad to see the weakness of English blood in Ireland. In a missive of 13 September 1582, White complained of the unfriendly dealings of Sir Lucas Dillon, his erstwhile companion and fellow Irish-born counsellor, stating they had been for a long time of 'contrary minds'. In spite of his sympathies for the native Irish, White was seemingly the author of an extraordinary trial by combat in September 1583 in which Teig MacGilpatrick O'Connor and Conor MacCormac O'Connor died. His usefulness as an Irish speaker and a nominal Protestant made White an essential Privy Counsellor for two decades.

== In popular culture ==
Cecil has been a character in many works of fiction connected with Elizabeth I's reign.

He has long been considered a likely model for the character of the King's calculating minister Polonius in William Shakespeare's Hamlet.

Richard Attenborough depicted him in the film Elizabeth (1998), although the portrayal was inaccurate in many ways, including in regards to age and length of service. He was played by Ben Webster in the 1935 film Drake of England. He was a prominent supporting character in the 1937 film Fire Over England, starring Laurence Olivier, Vivien Leigh, and Flora Robson; Burghley (spelled Burleigh in the film) was played by Morton Selten. He also appears in the 2005 television mini-series Elizabeth I with Helen Mirren, played by Ian McDiarmid; was portrayed by Ronald Hines in the 1971 TV series Elizabeth R; by Trevor Howard in the 1971 film Mary, Queen of Scots; and by Ian Hart in the 2005 miniseries The Virgin Queen. He is portrayed by David Thewlis in Roland Emmerich's Anonymous (2011). Cecil is portrayed by Ben Willbond in the BAFTA Award-winning children's comedy television series Horrible Histories; in the spin-off film, Bill (2015), he was played by Mathew Baynton. In the BBC TV miniseries Elizabeth I's Secret Agents (2017, broadcast on PBS in 2018 as Queen Elizabeth's Secret Agents), he is played by Philip Rosch.

As a stage character Cecil features in Friedrich Schiller's verse drama Mary Stuart and Robert Bolt's Vivat! Vivat Regina!. Bolt portrays him as intelligent, pragmatic, ruthless and driven by the interests of the State and the Crown.

Cecil appears as a character in the novels I, Elizabeth by Rosalind Miles, The Virgin's Lover and The Other Queen by Philippa Gregory, and is a prominent secondary character in several books by Bertrice Small. He is a prominent character in Legacy, a novel of Elizabeth I by Susan Kay. He also appears in the alternative history Ruled Britannia, by Harry Turtledove, in which he and his son Sir Robert Cecil are conspirators and patrons of William Shakespeare in an attempt to restore Elizabeth to power after a Spanish invasion and conquest of England. In addition, he is portrayed as a young man in Lamentation by C. J. Sansom. Burghley also appears in the espionage novels of Fiona Buckley, featuring Elizabeth I's half-sister, Ursula Blanchard.

Guy Pearce portrays Cecil in the 2018 historical drama Mary Queen of Scots, directed by Josie Rourke.

William Cecil appears as a character in Deborah Harkness' novel Shadow of Night, which is the second instalment of her "All Souls" Trilogy. Cecil is portrayed by Adrian Rawlins in the television adaptation of the triogy, A Discovery of Witches.

The Elizabethan-class Airspeed Ambassador G-ALZU that crashed in the 1958 Munich air disaster, was named Lord Burghley.

== See also ==
- Wimbledon Manor House

Cecil family tree, including earls of Exeter and Salisbury (1605) and marquesses of Exeter (1801) and Salisbury

David Cecil c. 1460–c. 1540
Richard Cecil c. 1495–1553
Baron Burghley, 1571
William Cecil; 1520–1598; 1st Baron Burghley | Mildred Cooke; 1526–1589
Earl of Exeter, 1605 | Baron Cecil, 1603; Viscount Cranborne, 1604; Earl of Salisbury (5th creation), 1605
Thomas Cecil; 1542–1623; 1st Earl of Exeter, 2nd Baron Burghley | Robert Cecil; 1563–1612; 1st Earl of Salisbury, etc.
Viscount Wimbledon and Baron Cecil of Putney, 1625
William Cecil; 1566–1600; 2nd Earl of Exeter, 3rd Baron Burghley | Richard Cecil; 1570–1633 | Edward Cecil; 1572–1638; Viscount Wimbledon and Baron Cecil of Putney | Thomas Howard; 1561–1626; 1st Earl of Suffolk
Barony of Cecil of Putney and viscounty of Wimbledon extinct, 1638
David Cecil c. 1600–1643; 3rd Earl of Exeter, 4th Baron Burghley | William Cecil; 1591–1668; 2nd Earl of Salisbury, etc. | Catherine c. 1590–1673
John Cecil; 1628–1678; 4th Earl of Exeter, 5th Baron Burghley | Charles Cecil; 1619–1660 styled Viscount Cranborne | John Manners; 1604–1679; 8th Earl of Rutland
John Cecil c. 1648–1700; 5th Earl of Exeter, 6th Baron Burghley | James Cecil; 1648–1683; 3rd Earl of Salisbury, etc. | Margaret d. c. 1682
John Cecil; 1674–1721; 6th Earl of Exeter, 7th Baron Burghley | James Cecil; 1666–1694; 4th Earl of Salisbury, etc. | Thomas Tufton; 1644–1729; 6th Earl of Thanet
John Cecil c. 1700–1722; 7th Earl of Exeter, 8th Baron Burghley | Brownlow Cecil; 1701–1754; 8th Earl of Exeter, 9th Baron Burghley | James Cecil; 1691–1728; 5th Earl of Salisbury, etc. | Anne; 1693–1757
Brownlow Cecil; 1725–1793; 9th Earl of Exeter, 10th Baron Burghley | James Cecil; 1713–1780; 6th Earl of Salisbury, etc. | Wills Hill; 1718–1793; 1st Marquess of Downshire
Marquess of Exeter (2nd creation), 1801 | Marquess of Salisbury, 1789
Henry Cecil; 1754–1804; 1st Marquess of Exeter, 10th Earl of Exeter, 11th Baron Burghley | James Cecil; 1743–1823; 1st Marquess of Salisbury, 7th Earl of Salisbury, etc. | Emily; 1750–1835
Brownlow Cecil; 1795–1867; 2nd Marquess of Exeter, 11th Earl of Exeter, 12th Baron Burghley | James Brownlow William Gascoyne-Cecil; 1791–1868; 2nd Marquess of Salisbury, 8th Earl of Salisbury, etc.
William Allen Cecil; 1825–1895; 3rd Marquess of Exeter, 12th Earl of Exeter, 13th Baron Burghley | James Emilius William Evelyn Gascoyne-Cecil; 1821–1865 styled Viscount Cranborne | Robert Arthur Talbot Gascoyne-Cecil; 1830–1903; 3rd Marquess of Salisbury, 9th Earl of Salisbury, etc.
Viscount Cecil of Chelwood, 1923
Brownlow Henry George Cecil; 1849–1898; 4th Marquess of Exeter, 13th Earl of Exeter, 14th Baron Burghley | Mary Rothes Margaret Cecil; 1857–1919; 2nd Baroness Amherst of Hackney | William Cecil; 1854–1943 | James Edward Hubert Gascoyne-Cecil; 1861–1947; 4th Marquess of Salisbury, 10th Earl of Salisbury, etc. | Edgar Algernon Robert Gascoyne-Cecil; 1864–1958; Viscount Cecil of Chelwood
Viscounty of Cecil of Chelwood extinct, 1958
William Thomas Brownlow Cecil; 1876–1956; 5th Marquess of Exeter, 14th Earl of Exeter, 15th Baron Burghley | William Amherst Cecil; 1886–1914 | Robert Arthur James Gascoyne-Cecil; 1893–1972; 5th Marquess of Salisbury, 11th Earl of Salisbury, etc.
David George Brownlow Cecil; 1905–1981; 6th Marquess of Exeter, 15th Earl of Exeter, 16th Baron Burghley | William Martin Alleyne Cecil; 1909–1988; 7th Marquess of Exeter, 16th Earl of Exeter, 17th Baron Burghley | William Alexander Evering Cecil; 1912–1980; 3rd Baron Amherst of Hackney | Robert Edward Peter Gascoyne-Cecil; 1916–2003; 6th Marquess of Salisbury, 12th Earl of Salisbury, etc.
William Michael Anthony Cecil b. 1935; 8th Marquess of Exeter, 17th Earl of Exeter, 18th Baron Burghley | William Hugh Amherst Cecil; 1940–2009; 4th Baron Amherst of Hackney | Robert Edward Peter Gascoyne-Cecil b. 1946; 7th Marquess of Salisbury, 13th Earl of Salisbury, etc.
Anthony Cecil b. 1970 styled Lord Burghley; Exeter heir apparent | Hugh William Amherst Cecil b. 1968; 5th Baron Amherst of Hackney; 2nd in line to Exeter | Robert Edward "Ned" William Gascoyne-Cecil b. 1970 styled Viscount Cranborne; Salisbury heir apparent | James Richard Gascoyne-Cecil b. 1976; 2nd in line to Salisbury

== Notes ==
Honorary titles
| New title | Custos Rotulorum of Lincolnshire; 1549–aft. 1584 | Succeeded by Thomas Cecil |
| Preceded by The Earl of Rutland | Lord Lieutenant of Lincolnshire; 1587–1598 | Succeeded by The Earl of Rutland |
| Preceded by The Earl of Leicester | Lord Lieutenant of Essex; 1588–1598 | Vacant Title next held by The Earl of Sussex |
| Preceded by The Earl of Leicester | Lord Lieutenant of Hertfordshire; 1588–1598 | Succeeded by Robert Cecil, 1st Earl of Salisbury |
Political offices
| Preceded by Nicholas Wotton; Sir William Petre | Secretary of State; 1550–1553; With: Sir William Petre | Succeeded by Sir John Bourne; Sir William Petre |
| Preceded by John Boxall | Secretary of State; 1558–1572 | Succeeded by Sir Thomas Smith |
| Preceded by Sir Nicholas Bacon | Lord Privy Seal; 1571–1572 | Succeeded by The Lord Howard of Effingham |
| Preceded by The Marquess of Winchester | Lord High Treasurer; 1572–1598 | Succeeded by The Earl of Dorset |
| Preceded by Sir Francis Walsingham | Lord Privy Seal; 1590–1598 | Succeeded by Robert Cecil, 1st Earl of Salisbury |
Academic offices
| New title | Chancellor of the University of Dublin; 1592–1598 | Succeeded by The Earl of Essex |
Peerage of England
| New title | Baron Burghley; 1571–1598 | Succeeded by Thomas Cecil |
