= Earl of Salisbury =

Title in the Peerage of England

Earldom of Salisbury
- Arms of Cecil-Gascogne, Marquess and Earl of Salisbury: Quarterly, 1st and 4th, Barry of ten Argent and Azure over all six Escutcheons Sable three two and one each charged with a Lion rampant of the First a Crescent for difference (Cecil); 2nd and 3rd, Argent on a Pale Sable a Conger's Head erased and erect Or charged with an Ermine Spot (Gascoyne)
- Creation date: 1149 (first creation); 1337 (second creation); 1472 (third creation); 1478 (fourth creation); 1512 (restoration); 1605 (sixth creation)
- Created by: Matilda (first creation); Edward III (second creation); Edward IV (third and fourth creation); Henry VIII (restoration); James I (fifth creation)
- Peerage: Peerage of England
- First holder: Patrick of Salisbury, 1st Earl of Salisbury
- Present holder: Robert Gascoyne-Cecil, 7th Marquess of Salisbury
- Heir apparent: Robert Gascoyne-Cecil, Viscount Cranborne
- Remainder to: Heirs male of the first earl's body lawfully begotten
- Extinction date: 1322 (first creation); 1471 (second creation); 1478 (third creation); 1484 (fourth creation); 1539 (fifth creation)
- Seats: Hatfield House, Cranborne Manor

Earl of Salisbury is a title that has been created several times in English and British history. It has a complex history and is now a subsidiary title to the marquessate of Salisbury.

== Background ==
The title was first created for Patrick de Salisbury in the middle twelfth century. In 1196 the title passed to Patrick's granddaughter, Ela, who married William Longespée, an illegitimate son of Henry II the same year. Ela was predeceased by husband, son and grandson, and was succeeded by her great-granddaughter, Margaret Longespée. Margaret married Henry de Lacy, 3rd Earl of Lincoln, and their daughter Alice eventually became Countess of Salisbury, in 1310, and of Lincoln, in 1311. Alice had married Thomas, Earl of Lancaster, in 1294. When the Earl of Lancaster lost his titles and was executed for treason in 1322, the Countess surrendered all of her titles to the King, and the titles lapsed.

The title was created for a second time in 1337 for William Montacute of the noble House of Montagu. This line ended in the sole heiress, Alice Montacute, and her husband Richard Neville took up the earldom 'by right of his wife'. (Note: Complete Peerage records (XI, p. 395, note (o)) that Parliament agreed to this until the king came of age. The question then is whether this was or was not a creation of a new line. Complete Peerage did not think so and treated all earls up to and including Margaret Plantagenet as part of the one line created in 1337. Certainly the earldom was inherited later by Richard Neville the Kingmaker, upon whose death the title went into abeyance because multiple individuals were entitled to inherit it. However in those days the modern doctrine of abeyance had not been formulated, certainly on Richard the Kingmaker's death there were only his two daughters and daughters were always regarded as equal in status unlike sons where the first son was always first in status and inheritance; so without a Royal initiative it was impossible to say to which daughter the title should go, not to mention that Richard earl of Warwick and Salisbury had been in rebellion against the sovereign and died in battle.)

After Richard's death at the Battle of Barnet, in 1471, the title was granted in 1472 to George, Duke of Clarence, who was married to Richard's eldest daughter. When the Duke of Clarence was executed in 1478 for treason (supposedly by being drowned in a vat of Malmsey wine), the title was forfeit. It was then granted to Edward of Middleham (who was his nephew via the Duke's brother Richard), who died in 1484 at the age of 10.

It was restored to two of George of Clarence's children: to his son Edward in 1485 until his execution for treason in 1499, and to Edward's sister, Margaret Pole, Countess of Salisbury, in 1513 until she was also executed, and the title again forfeited, in 1539.

In 1605 the title was given to Robert Cecil, a close advisor to James I. Cecil was a son of Queen Elizabeth I's chief advisor, William Cecil, 1st Baron Burghley, and half-brother to Thomas Cecil, 1st Earl of Exeter. In 1789 James Cecil, the 7th Earl, was created the Marquess of Salisbury by George III.

== Titleholders ==
=== First creation (1145) ===
- Patrick of Salisbury, 1st Earl of Salisbury (c. 1122-1168)
- William of Salisbury, 2nd Earl of Salisbury (d. 1196)
- Ela of Salisbury, 3rd Countess of Salisbury (1187–1261)
  - William Longespée, 3rd Earl of Salisbury jure uxoris (c. 1176–1226)
- Margaret Longespée, 4th Countess of Salisbury (d. 1310)
  - Henry de Lacy, Earl of Salisbury jure uxoris (d. 1311)
- Alice de Lacy, 5th Countess of Salisbury (1281–1348) (forfeit 1322)

=== Second creation (1337) ===
Arms of Montacute family

Arms of Neville "the Kingmaker"

- William Montagu, 1st Earl of Salisbury (1301–1344)
- William Montagu, 2nd Earl of Salisbury (1328–1397)
- John Montagu, 3rd Earl of Salisbury (1350–1400) (forfeit 1400)
- Thomas Montagu, 4th Earl of Salisbury (1388–1428) (restored 1421, although styled and summoned to parliament as such from at least 1409)
- Alice Montacute, 5th Countess of Salisbury (1407–1462)
  - Richard Neville, 5th Earl of Salisbury jure uxoris
- Richard Neville, 6th Earl of Salisbury (1428–1471) and jure uxoris 16th Earl of Warwick ("Warwick the Kingmaker") by his wife Anne Beauchamp, 16th Countess of Warwick (reverted to the crown 1471; by modern law it might, with his other titles, be abeyant).

=== Third creation (1472) ===
- George Plantagenet, 1st Earl of Salisbury (1449–1478) (forfeit 1478); son-in-law of the last Neville earl

=== Fourth creation (1478) ===
- Edward of Middleham, later Prince of Wales (1476–1484); nephew to George Plantagenet and grandson of the last Neville earl (extinct 1484)

=== Restoration of second or third creation (1512) ===
- Some sources call Edward Plantagenet, 17th Earl of Warwick (1475–1499) also Earl of Salisbury, but "there is no reason to suppose that he ever enjoyed that dignity". (Note: Edward was son of George of Clarence above, and the other grandson of the last Neville earl; if the modern doctrine of abeyance were retroactively applied to earldoms - as it has not been - he would have inherited the Earldom of Salisbury in 1484; unless the creation of 1472 would be the termination of the abeyance. After 1485 he was kept in custody and did not attend the House of Lords under any title; in the intervening months, he was too young to sit. He was executed and attainted in 1499 at the age of 24, at which point all his titles, whatever they may have been, were forfeit. It is possible, however, that he had used it as a courtesy title, as it was a subsidiary title of his father.)
- Margaret Plantagenet, Countess of Salisbury (1473–1541) (restored or created 1512; forfeit 1539), only sister of the above; sources differ on whether the Earldom of Salisbury restored to her was her father's (the third creation) or her grandfather's (second).

=== Fifth creation (1605) ===
Arms of the Cecil family

- Robert Cecil, 1st Earl of Salisbury (1563–1612)
- William Cecil, 2nd Earl of Salisbury (1591–1668)
- James Cecil, 3rd Earl of Salisbury (1648–1683)
- James Cecil, 4th Earl of Salisbury (1666–1694)
- James Cecil, 5th Earl of Salisbury (1691–1728)
- James Cecil, 6th Earl of Salisbury (1713–1780)
- James Cecil, 7th Earl of Salisbury (1748–1823) (created Marquess of Salisbury in 1789)
- see Marquess of Salisbury for further history

== Family tree ==
Cecil family tree, including earls of Exeter and Salisbury (1605) and marquesses of Exeter (1801) and Salisbury

David Cecil c. 1460–c. 1540
Richard Cecil c. 1495–1553
Baron Burghley, 1571
William Cecil; 1520–1598; 1st Baron Burghley	Mildred Cooke; 1526–1589
Earl of Exeter, 1605	Baron Cecil, 1603; Viscount Cranborne, 1604; Earl of Salisbury (5th creation), 1605
Thomas Cecil; 1542–1623; 1st Earl of Exeter, 2nd Baron Burghley	Robert Cecil; 1563–1612; 1st Earl of Salisbury, etc.
Viscount Wimbledon and Baron Cecil of Putney, 1625
William Cecil; 1566–1600; 2nd Earl of Exeter, 3rd Baron Burghley	Richard Cecil; 1570–1633	Edward Cecil; 1572–1638; Viscount Wimbledon and Baron Cecil of Putney	Thomas Howard; 1561–1626; 1st Earl of Suffolk
Barony of Cecil of Putney and viscounty of Wimbledon extinct, 1638
David Cecil c. 1600–1643; 3rd Earl of Exeter, 4th Baron Burghley	William Cecil; 1591–1668; 2nd Earl of Salisbury, etc.	Catherine c. 1590–1673
John Cecil; 1628–1678; 4th Earl of Exeter, 5th Baron Burghley	Charles Cecil; 1619–1660 styled Viscount Cranborne	John Manners; 1604–1679; 8th Earl of Rutland
John Cecil c. 1648–1700; 5th Earl of Exeter, 6th Baron Burghley	James Cecil; 1648–1683; 3rd Earl of Salisbury, etc.	Margaret d. c. 1682
John Cecil; 1674–1721; 6th Earl of Exeter, 7th Baron Burghley	James Cecil; 1666–1694; 4th Earl of Salisbury, etc.	Thomas Tufton; 1644–1729; 6th Earl of Thanet
John Cecil c. 1700–1722; 7th Earl of Exeter, 8th Baron Burghley	Brownlow Cecil; 1701–1754; 8th Earl of Exeter, 9th Baron Burghley	James Cecil; 1691–1728; 5th Earl of Salisbury, etc.	Anne; 1693–1757
Brownlow Cecil; 1725–1793; 9th Earl of Exeter, 10th Baron Burghley	James Cecil; 1713–1780; 6th Earl of Salisbury, etc.	Wills Hill; 1718–1793; 1st Marquess of Downshire
Marquess of Exeter (2nd creation), 1801	Marquess of Salisbury, 1789
Henry Cecil; 1754–1804; 1st Marquess of Exeter, 10th Earl of Exeter, 11th Baron Burghley	James Cecil; 1743–1823; 1st Marquess of Salisbury, 7th Earl of Salisbury, etc.	Emily; 1750–1835
Brownlow Cecil; 1795–1867; 2nd Marquess of Exeter, 11th Earl of Exeter, 12th Baron Burghley	James Brownlow William Gascoyne-Cecil; 1791–1868; 2nd Marquess of Salisbury, 8th Earl of Salisbury, etc.
William Allen Cecil; 1825–1895; 3rd Marquess of Exeter, 12th Earl of Exeter, 13th Baron Burghley	James Emilius William Evelyn Gascoyne-Cecil; 1821–1865 styled Viscount Cranborne	Robert Arthur Talbot Gascoyne-Cecil; 1830–1903; 3rd Marquess of Salisbury, 9th Earl of Salisbury, etc.
Viscount Cecil of Chelwood, 1923
Brownlow Henry George Cecil; 1849–1898; 4th Marquess of Exeter, 13th Earl of Exeter, 14th Baron Burghley	Mary Rothes Margaret Cecil; 1857–1919; 2nd Baroness Amherst of Hackney	William Cecil; 1854–1943	James Edward Hubert Gascoyne-Cecil; 1861–1947; 4th Marquess of Salisbury, 10th Earl of Salisbury, etc.	Edgar Algernon Robert Gascoyne-Cecil; 1864–1958; Viscount Cecil of Chelwood
Viscounty of Cecil of Chelwood extinct, 1958
William Thomas Brownlow Cecil; 1876–1956; 5th Marquess of Exeter, 14th Earl of Exeter, 15th Baron Burghley	William Amherst Cecil; 1886–1914	Robert Arthur James Gascoyne-Cecil; 1893–1972; 5th Marquess of Salisbury, 11th Earl of Salisbury, etc.
David George Brownlow Cecil; 1905–1981; 6th Marquess of Exeter, 15th Earl of Exeter, 16th Baron Burghley	William Martin Alleyne Cecil; 1909–1988; 7th Marquess of Exeter, 16th Earl of Exeter, 17th Baron Burghley	William Alexander Evering Cecil; 1912–1980; 3rd Baron Amherst of Hackney	Robert Edward Peter Gascoyne-Cecil; 1916–2003; 6th Marquess of Salisbury, 12th Earl of Salisbury, etc.
William Michael Anthony Cecil b. 1935; 8th Marquess of Exeter, 17th Earl of Exeter, 18th Baron Burghley	William Hugh Amherst Cecil; 1940–2009; 4th Baron Amherst of Hackney	Robert Edward Peter Gascoyne-Cecil b. 1946; 7th Marquess of Salisbury, 13th Earl of Salisbury, etc.
Anthony Cecil b. 1970 styled Lord Burghley; Exeter heir apparent	Hugh William Amherst Cecil b. 1968; 5th Baron Amherst of Hackney; 2nd in line to Exeter	Robert Edward "Ned" William Gascoyne-Cecil b. 1970 styled Viscount Cranborne; Salisbury heir apparent	James Richard Gascoyne-Cecil b. 1976; 2nd in line to Salisbury
