= James Cecil =

James Cecil may refer to:

- James Cecil, 3rd Earl of Salisbury (1648–1683)
- James Cecil, 4th Earl of Salisbury (1666–1694)
- James Cecil, 5th Earl of Salisbury (1691–1728)
- James Cecil, 6th Earl of Salisbury (1713–1780)
- James Cecil, 1st Marquess of Salisbury (1748–1823)
- James Cecil, 3rd Baron Rockley (1934–2011)

== See also ==
- James Gascoyne-Cecil (disambiguation)
