= Marquess of Salisbury =

Title in the Peerage of Great Britain

Marquessate of Salisbury
- Arms: Quarterly, 1st and 4th, Barry of ten Argent and Azure, over all six Escutcheons Sable, three two and one each charged with a Lion rampant of the First, a Crescent Gules for difference (Cecil); 2nd and 3rd, Argent, on a Pale Sable, a Conger's Head erased and erect Or, charged with an Ermine Spot (Gascoyne). Crests: 1st, Six Arrows in saltire Or, barbed and flighted Argent, bound together with a Belt Gules, buckled and garnished Gold, over the arrows a Morion Cap proper (Cecil); 2nd, A Conger's Head erased and erect Or, charged with an Ermine Spot (Gascoyne). Supporters: On either side a Lion Ermine.
- Creation date: 10 August 1789
- Created by: King George III
- Peerage: Peerage of Great Britain
- First holder: James Cecil, 7th Earl of Salisbury
- Present holder: Robert Gascoyne-Cecil, 7th Marquess
- Heir apparent: Edward Gascoyne-Cecil, Viscount Cranborne
- Remainder to: the 1st Marquess's heirs male of the body lawfully begotten
- Subsidiary titles: Earl of Salisbury; Viscount Cranborne; Baron Cecil
- Status: Extant
- Seats: Hatfield House; Cranborne Manor
- Motto: SERO SED SERIO (Late but seriously)

Marquess of Salisbury is a title in the Peerage of Great Britain, held by a branch of the Cecil family. It was created in 1789 for the 7th earl of Salisbury. Most of the holders of the title have been prominent in British political life over the last two centuries, particularly the 3rd marquess, who served three times as prime minister in the late 19th and early 20th centuries.

== Background ==
This branch of the Cecil family descends from Sir Robert Cecil, the son of Elizabeth I's chief minister William Cecil, 1st Baron Burghley, from his second marriage, to Mildred Cooke. His elder half-brother the 2nd Baron Burghley was created Earl of Exeter in 1605 and is the ancestor of the Marquesses of Exeter. Cecil notably served under Elizabeth and later King James I as Secretary of State, Chancellor of the Duchy of Lancaster, Lord Privy Seal and Lord High Treasurer. In 1603 he was raised to the Peerage of England as Baron Cecil, of Essendon in the County of Rutland, and the following year he was created Viscount Cranborne. In 1605 he was further created Earl of Salisbury. The last two titles were also in the Peerage of England.

The Earl of Salisbury was succeeded by his son, the second earl. He represented Weymouth in the House of Commons and also served as Captain of the Honourable Band of Gentlemen Pensioners and as Lord Lieutenant of Hertfordshire and Dorsetshire. His great-grandson, the fourth earl, converted to Roman Catholicism; and in 1689 the House of Commons decided to impeach him for high treason. However, the charges were not brought any further and he was succeeded by his son, the fifth earl, Lord Lieutenant of Hertfordshire.

== History ==
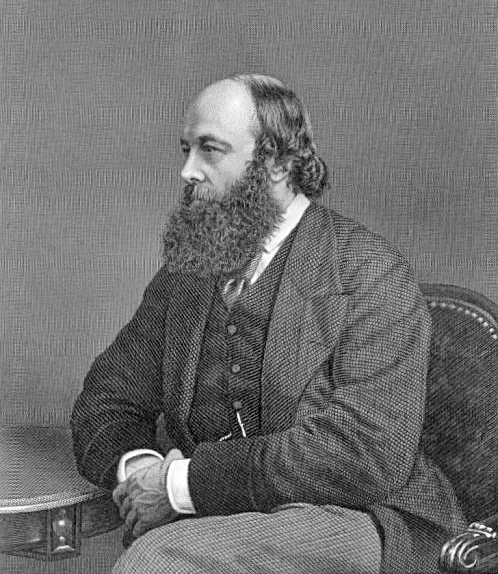
Robert Gascoyne-Cecil, 3rd Marquess of Salisbury

The seventh earl was a politician and served as Lord Chamberlain of the Household for many years. In 1789, he was created Marquess of Salisbury in the Peerage of Great Britain.

He was succeeded by his eldest son, the second marquess. He was a Conservative politician and held office as Lord Privy Seal and Lord President of the Council. Lord Salisbury married as his first wife Frances Mary Gascoyne, daughter of Bamber Gascoyne, in 1821. The same year he assumed by royal licence the additional surname of Gascoyne.

He was succeeded by his third but eldest surviving son, the third marquess. He was prime minister three times – from 1885 to 1886, 1886 to 1892, and 1895 to 1902 – and also served four times as foreign secretary. His time as prime minister coincided with a great expansion of the British Empire. Lord Salisbury is also remembered as an adherent of the policy of "splendid isolation", the desire to keep Great Britain out of European affairs and alliances. He was also "the last Prime Minister to lead a government from the Lords". Salisbury was offered a dukedom by Queen Victoria in 1886 and 1892, but declined both offers, citing the prohibitive cost of the lifestyle dukes were expected to maintain.

He was succeeded by his eldest son, the fourth marquess. He too was an influential Conservative politician and served as Lord Privy Seal, as President of the Board of Trade, as Lord President of the Council, as Chancellor of the Duchy of Lancaster and as Leader of the House of Lords. Like his father, he was regarded as a staunch Conservative; and he bitterly opposed the Parliament Act 1911, which sought to curtail the powers of the House of Lords.

His eldest son, the fifth marquess, likewise was a Conservative politician. In 1941 he was summoned to the House of Lords through a writ of acceleration in his father's junior title of Baron Cecil. During his career Lord Salisbury notably held office as Paymaster General, Secretary of State for the Dominions, Secretary of State for the Colonies, Lord Privy Seal and Leader of the House of Lords. He was an opponent of attempts to reform the House of Lords but was forced to see the Parliament Act 1949 even further limit the power of the House of Lords. However, Lord Salisbury was also behind the Salisbury Convention of 1945, which states that the House of Lords shall not oppose the second reading of any government legislation promised in its election manifesto.

The fifth marquess was succeeded by his eldest son, the sixth marquess. Although he briefly represented Bournemouth West in Parliament he did not take such an active role in national politics as his predecessors.

As of 2012, the titles are held by the sixth marquess's eldest son, the seventh marquess, who succeeded in 2003. The seventh marquess is also a Conservative politician. After representing South Dorset in the House of Commons, he was summoned to the House of Lords through a writ of acceleration in his father's junior title of Baron Cecil in 1992 (the last time a writ of acceleration was issued). Lord Salisbury then served under his close political ally John Major as Lord Privy Seal and Leader of the House of Lords from 1994 to 1997. As Leader of the Opposition in the House of Lords after 1997, he played a leading role in negotiating the terms of the House of Lords Act 1999, in which the automatic right of hereditary peers to sit in the upper chamber of Parliament was abolished. Salisbury managed to obtain a compromise with the Labour government of Tony Blair, whereby 92 selected hereditary peers were allowed to remain on an interim basis. However, the compromise was agreed without the knowledge of Conservative leader William Hague and Salisbury was dismissed as Conservative Leader in the House of Lords. The same year, along with all former Leaders of the House of Lords, he was given a life peerage as Baron Gascoyne-Cecil, of Essendon in the County of Rutland, in the Peerage of the United Kingdom, so that he could remain a member of the House of Lords. He continued to sit under his life peerage until 8 June 2017, when he retired from the House under Section 1 of the House of Lords Reform Act 2014.

Several other members of the Cecil family have gained distinction. Lord Eustace Cecil, fourth son of the second marquess, was a lieutenant-colonel in the Army and Member of Parliament. His son Evelyn Cecil was a Conservative politician and was created Baron Rockley in 1934. The Right Reverend Lord William Gascoyne-Cecil, Bishop of Exeter; Robert Cecil, 1st Viscount Cecil of Chelwood; Lord Edward Cecil; and Hugh Cecil, 1st Baron Quickswood; were all younger sons of the third marquess. Lord David Cecil, Professor of English Literature at the University of Oxford, was the second son of the fourth marquess, while the journalist Lord Richard Cecil was the second son of the sixth marquess. Also, Lady Blanche Gascoyne-Cecil, daughter of the second marquess, was the mother of Prime Minister Arthur Balfour, 1st Earl of Balfour.

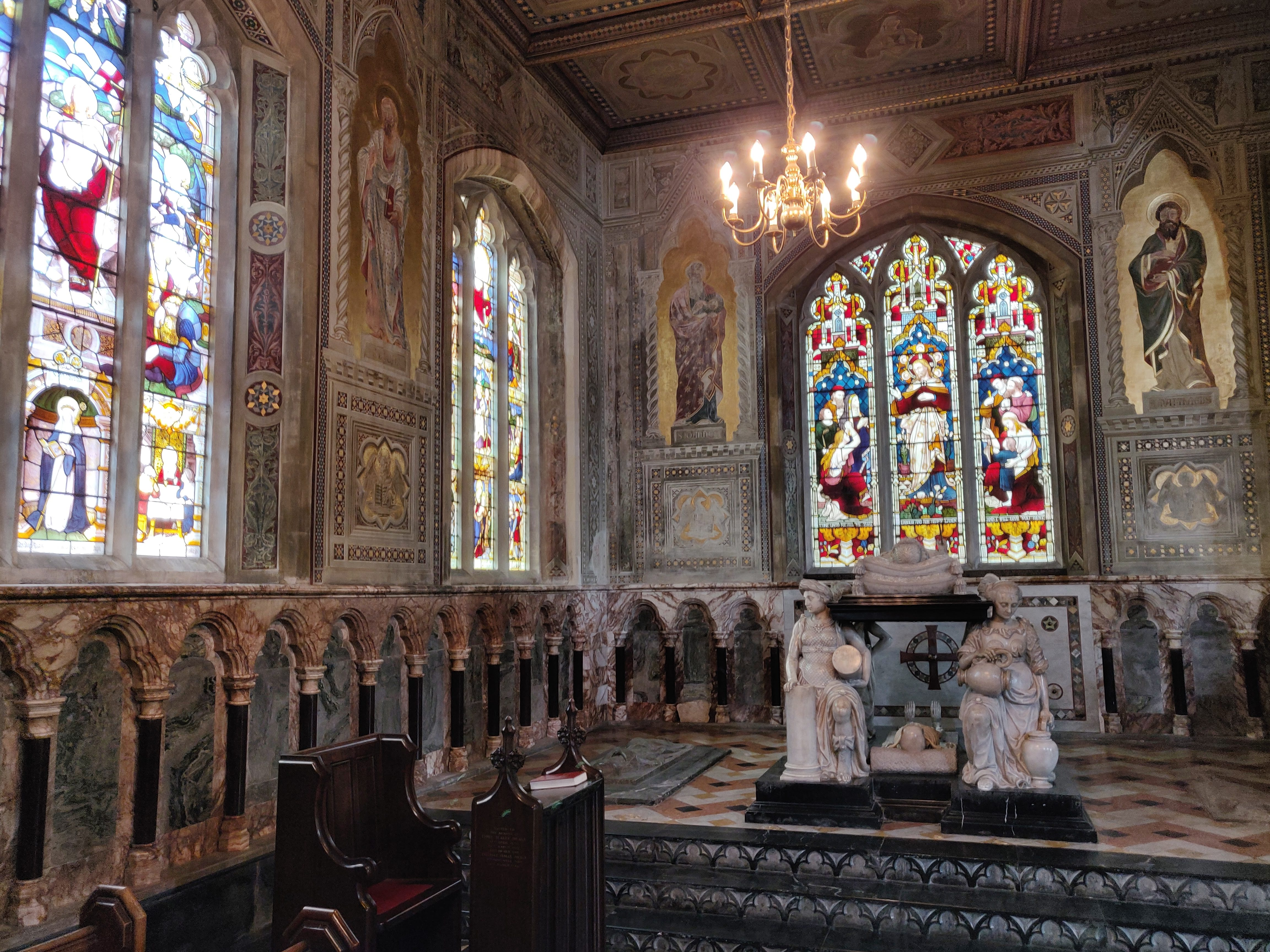
The Salisbury Chapel in St Etheldreda Church, Hatfield, traditional burial place of the marquesses

The family seats are Hatfield House and Cranborne Manor. The traditional burial place of the marquesses is the Salisbury Chapel in St Etheldreda Church, Hatfield House, Hertfordshire. The 6th marquess had holdings of 8,500 acres around Hatfield House, and 1,300 acres at Cranborne Manor, Dorset. At the time of his obituary he owned property around Leicester and Leicester Square, London, held by Gascoyne Holdings.

All the marquesses, except the 6th marquess, have been appointed as Knights Companion of the Order of the Garter.

== Earls of Salisbury (1605) ==
- Robert Cecil, 1st Earl of Salisbury (1563–1612)
- William Cecil, 2nd Earl of Salisbury (1591–1668)
- James Cecil, 3rd Earl of Salisbury (1648–1683)
- James Cecil, 4th Earl of Salisbury (1666–1694)
- James Cecil, 5th Earl of Salisbury (1691–1728)
- James Cecil, 6th Earl of Salisbury (1713–1780)
- James Cecil, 7th Earl of Salisbury (1748–1823) (created Marquess of Salisbury in 1789)

== Marquesses of Salisbury (1789) ==
- James Cecil, 1st Marquess of Salisbury (1748–1823)
- James Brownlow William Gascoyne-Cecil, 2nd Marquess of Salisbury (1791–1868)
- Robert Arthur Talbot Gascoyne-Cecil, 3rd Marquess of Salisbury (1830–1903)
- James Edward Hubert Gascoyne-Cecil, 4th Marquess of Salisbury (1861–1947)
- Robert Arthur James Gascoyne-Cecil, 5th Marquess of Salisbury (1893–1972)
- Robert Edward Peter Cecil Gascoyne-Cecil, 6th Marquess of Salisbury (1916–2003)
- Robert Michael James Gascoyne-Cecil, 7th Marquess of Salisbury (b. 1946)

The heir apparent is the present holder's son Robert Edward William Gascoyne-Cecil, Viscount Cranborne (b. 1970).

== Family tree ==
The Cecils are descended from Sir David Cecil (c. 1460 – 1540), a Welsh landowner, courtier, and Member of Parliament. He was born into a Welsh family, the third son of Richard Cecil ap Philip Seisyllt of Alt-yr-Ynys on the border of Herefordshire and Monmouthshire but settled near Stamford, Lincolnshire. The spelling of the family name as Seisyllt is still similar to how the name is pronounced, Sissill.

Cecil family tree, including earls of Exeter and Salisbury (1605) and marquesses of Exeter (1801) and Salisbury

David Cecil c. 1460–c. 1540
Richard Cecil c. 1495–1553
Baron Burghley, 1571
William Cecil; 1520–1598; 1st Baron Burghley	Mildred Cooke; 1526–1589
Earl of Exeter, 1605	Baron Cecil, 1603; Viscount Cranborne, 1604; Earl of Salisbury (5th creation), 1605
Thomas Cecil; 1542–1623; 1st Earl of Exeter, 2nd Baron Burghley	Robert Cecil; 1563–1612; 1st Earl of Salisbury, etc.
Viscount Wimbledon and Baron Cecil of Putney, 1625
William Cecil; 1566–1600; 2nd Earl of Exeter, 3rd Baron Burghley	Richard Cecil; 1570–1633	Edward Cecil; 1572–1638; Viscount Wimbledon and Baron Cecil of Putney	Thomas Howard; 1561–1626; 1st Earl of Suffolk
Barony of Cecil of Putney and viscounty of Wimbledon extinct, 1638
David Cecil c. 1600–1643; 3rd Earl of Exeter, 4th Baron Burghley	William Cecil; 1591–1668; 2nd Earl of Salisbury, etc.	Catherine c. 1590–1673
John Cecil; 1628–1678; 4th Earl of Exeter, 5th Baron Burghley	Charles Cecil; 1619–1660 styled Viscount Cranborne	John Manners; 1604–1679; 8th Earl of Rutland
John Cecil c. 1648–1700; 5th Earl of Exeter, 6th Baron Burghley	James Cecil; 1648–1683; 3rd Earl of Salisbury, etc.	Margaret d. c. 1682
John Cecil; 1674–1721; 6th Earl of Exeter, 7th Baron Burghley	James Cecil; 1666–1694; 4th Earl of Salisbury, etc.	Thomas Tufton; 1644–1729; 6th Earl of Thanet
John Cecil c. 1700–1722; 7th Earl of Exeter, 8th Baron Burghley	Brownlow Cecil; 1701–1754; 8th Earl of Exeter, 9th Baron Burghley	James Cecil; 1691–1728; 5th Earl of Salisbury, etc.	Anne; 1693–1757
Brownlow Cecil; 1725–1793; 9th Earl of Exeter, 10th Baron Burghley	James Cecil; 1713–1780; 6th Earl of Salisbury, etc.	Wills Hill; 1718–1793; 1st Marquess of Downshire
Marquess of Exeter (2nd creation), 1801	Marquess of Salisbury, 1789
Henry Cecil; 1754–1804; 1st Marquess of Exeter, 10th Earl of Exeter, 11th Baron Burghley	James Cecil; 1743–1823; 1st Marquess of Salisbury, 7th Earl of Salisbury, etc.	Emily; 1750–1835
Brownlow Cecil; 1795–1867; 2nd Marquess of Exeter, 11th Earl of Exeter, 12th Baron Burghley	James Brownlow William Gascoyne-Cecil; 1791–1868; 2nd Marquess of Salisbury, 8th Earl of Salisbury, etc.
William Allen Cecil; 1825–1895; 3rd Marquess of Exeter, 12th Earl of Exeter, 13th Baron Burghley	James Emilius William Evelyn Gascoyne-Cecil; 1821–1865 styled Viscount Cranborne	Robert Arthur Talbot Gascoyne-Cecil; 1830–1903; 3rd Marquess of Salisbury, 9th Earl of Salisbury, etc.
Viscount Cecil of Chelwood, 1923
Brownlow Henry George Cecil; 1849–1898; 4th Marquess of Exeter, 13th Earl of Exeter, 14th Baron Burghley	Mary Rothes Margaret Cecil; 1857–1919; 2nd Baroness Amherst of Hackney	William Cecil; 1854–1943	James Edward Hubert Gascoyne-Cecil; 1861–1947; 4th Marquess of Salisbury, 10th Earl of Salisbury, etc.	Edgar Algernon Robert Gascoyne-Cecil; 1864–1958; Viscount Cecil of Chelwood
Viscounty of Cecil of Chelwood extinct, 1958
William Thomas Brownlow Cecil; 1876–1956; 5th Marquess of Exeter, 14th Earl of Exeter, 15th Baron Burghley	William Amherst Cecil; 1886–1914	Robert Arthur James Gascoyne-Cecil; 1893–1972; 5th Marquess of Salisbury, 11th Earl of Salisbury, etc.
David George Brownlow Cecil; 1905–1981; 6th Marquess of Exeter, 15th Earl of Exeter, 16th Baron Burghley	William Martin Alleyne Cecil; 1909–1988; 7th Marquess of Exeter, 16th Earl of Exeter, 17th Baron Burghley	William Alexander Evering Cecil; 1912–1980; 3rd Baron Amherst of Hackney	Robert Edward Peter Gascoyne-Cecil; 1916–2003; 6th Marquess of Salisbury, 12th Earl of Salisbury, etc.
William Michael Anthony Cecil b. 1935; 8th Marquess of Exeter, 17th Earl of Exeter, 18th Baron Burghley	William Hugh Amherst Cecil; 1940–2009; 4th Baron Amherst of Hackney	Robert Edward Peter Gascoyne-Cecil b. 1946; 7th Marquess of Salisbury, 13th Earl of Salisbury, etc.
Anthony Cecil b. 1970 styled Lord Burghley; Exeter heir apparent	Hugh William Amherst Cecil b. 1968; 5th Baron Amherst of Hackney; 2nd in line to Exeter	Robert Edward "Ned" William Gascoyne-Cecil b. 1970 styled Viscount Cranborne; Salisbury heir apparent	James Richard Gascoyne-Cecil b. 1976; 2nd in line to Salisbury

Cecil of Salisbury Genealogy

Line of succession (simplified)
- James Gascoyne-Cecil, 2nd Marquess of Salisbury (1791–1868)
  - Robert Gascoyne-Cecil, 3rd Marquess of Salisbury (1830–1903)
    - James Gascoyne-Cecil, 4th Marquess of Salisbury (1861–1947)
      - Robert Gascoyne-Cecil, 5th Marquess of Salisbury (1893–1972)
        - Robert Gascoyne-Cecil, 6th Marquess of Salisbury (1916–2003)
          - Robert Gascoyne-Cecil, 7th Marquess of Salisbury, Baron Gascoyne-Cecil (b. 1946)
            - (1). Robert Edward William Gascoyne-Cecil, Viscount Cranborne (b. 1970)
            - (2). Lord James Richard Gascoyne-Cecil (b. 1973)
              - (3). Thomas Richard James Gascoyne-Cecil (b. 2009)
              - (4). William Alexander David Gascoyne-Cecil (b. 2014)
          - (5). Lord Charles Edward Vere Gascoyne-Cecil (b. 1949)
          - (6). Lord Valentine William Gascoyne-Cecil (b. 1952)
          - (7). Lord Michael Hugh Cecil (b. 1960)
            - (8). Hubert George Gascoyne-Cecil (b. 1992)
            - (9). Edward William James Gascoyne-Cecil (b. 1996)
      - Lord Edward Christian David Gascoyne-Cecil (1902–1986)
        - Hugh Peniston Cecil (1941–2020)
          - male issue and descendants in remainder
    - Lord Rupert Ernest William Gascoyne-Cecil (1863–1936)
      - Victor Alexander Gascoyne-Cecil (1891–1977)
        - Rupert Arthur Victor Cecil (1917–2004)
          - male issue and descendants in remainder
        - Anthony Robert Gascoyne-Cecil (1921–1998)
          - male issue and descendants in remainder
  - Lord Eustace Cecil (1834–1921)
    - Barons Rockley

== See also ==
- Marquess of Exeter
- Viscount Cecil of Chelwood
- Baron Quickswood
- Baron Rockley
- Viscount Wimbledon
