= James Cecil, 4th Earl of Salisbury =

English nobleman, politician and peer (1666–1694)

The Right Honourable The Earl of Salisbury
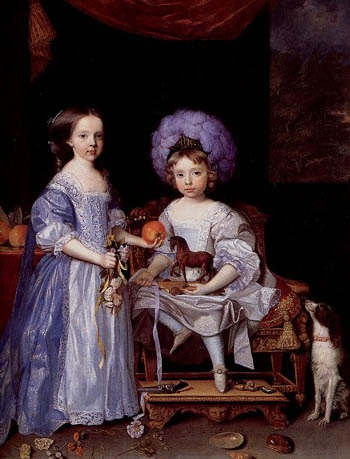
- James Cecil and his sister Lady Catherine by John Michael Wright, 1669
- Born: 1666
- Died: 1694 (aged 28)
- Spouse: Frances Bennett (m. 1683)
- Children: James Cecil, 5th Earl of Salisbury
- Parent(s): James Cecil, 3rd Earl of Salisbury; Lady Margaret Manners

James Cecil, 4th Earl of Salisbury (1666–1694), until 1683 known by the courtesy title of Viscount Cranborne, was an English nobleman, politician, and peer.

A courtier of King James II, during the Glorious Revolution of 1688 he commanded a regiment in support of the king. Afterwards, he was imprisoned in the Tower of London for some twenty-two months, eventually being charged with high treason. Although released in October 1690 following a general pardon, he died in 1694 at the age of twenty-eight.

== Early life ==
Baptised on 25 September 1666, Salisbury was one of the ten children of James Cecil, 3rd Earl of Salisbury KG, by his marriage in 1661 to Lady Margaret Manners, a daughter of John Manners, 8th Earl of Rutland. He was educated at St John's College, Cambridge, and as his father's eldest surviving son succeeded him when he died in May 1683. In 1656 Thomas Russell purchased half of Witley Park in Surrey for Cecil's father-in-law and a half share, therefore, passed on the marriage of each daughter, one of whom was Cecil's wife.

On 13 July 1683, at the age of sixteen, the new Earl of Salisbury married Frances Bennett (1670–1713), a daughter of Simon Bennett, of Buckinghamshire. Bennett, who by the time of this marriage had died, had left three daughters, and in his will had left them each £20,000, subject to their not marrying before the age of sixteen or without the consent of those he named, with the proviso that the legacy of a daughter doing so was to be reduced to £10,000. Frances Bennett married Salisbury before she was sixteen, but with the consent of the Executors to the will, and this later led to litigation.

== Career and imprisonment ==
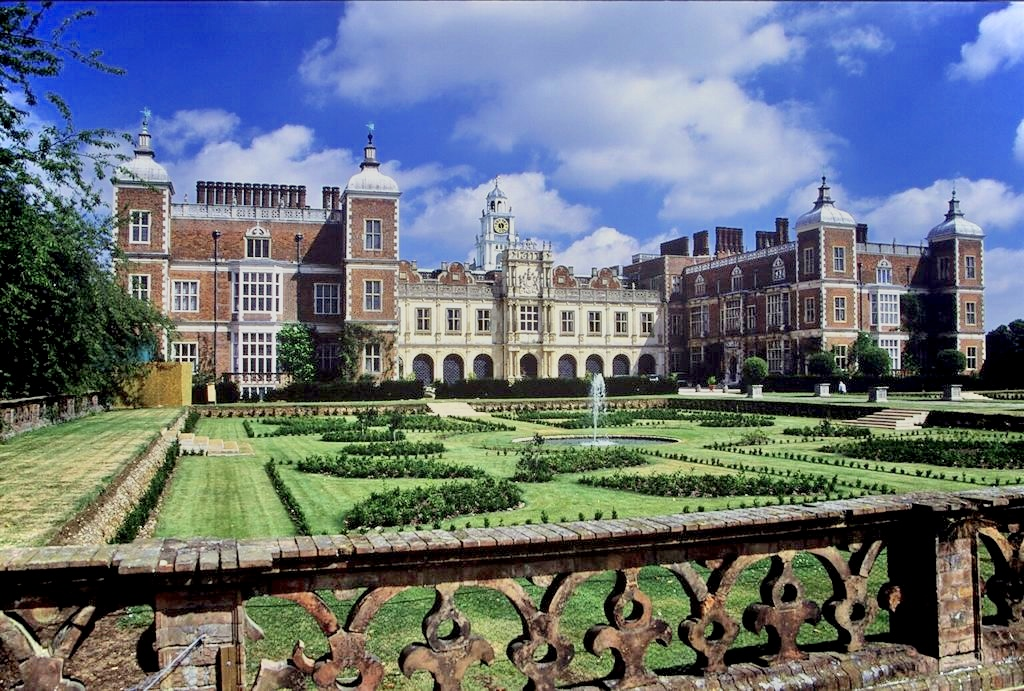
Hatfield House, Salisbury's seat in Hertfordshire

Salisbury inherited from his father the position of Capital Steward of the borough of Hertford.

After his marriage, he travelled abroad for some years, returning to England at about the beginning of 1688. That year, he was appointed a Gentleman of the Bedchamber to King James II and converted to Roman Catholicism, but his appointment was overtaken by the Glorious Revolution of October to December 1688, during which he served the king as Colonel of a regiment of horse.

Salisbury was arrested in January 1688/89. On 26 October 1689 the House of Commons impeached him with the Earl of Peterborough for high treason on the grounds of "departing from their allegiance and being reconciled to the Church of Rome" and asked the House of Lords to commit them. On the same day the Lords ordered the two men to be brought to the bar of that House. Salisbury was already imprisoned in the Tower of London, and the Lords ordered that "his lady, friends and servants" were to have access to him. Brought to the House on 28 October, in reply to the charge Salisbury said:

I went abroad young and was seven years out, and did not return a year before I was committed. As for my religion, when I come to defend it, I will defend myself as well as I can: I hope this honourable house doth not expect I should accuse myself."

Salisbury remained in the Tower without trial. On 2 October 1690, the House of Lords read his petition, which stated "That he hath been a prisoner for a year and nine months, notwithstanding the late act of free and general pardon, and praying to be discharged." On 30 October, the Lords found that both Salisbury and Peterborough had been pardoned by "the king and queen's most gracious, general and free pardon" and resolved to discharge them both without hearing the views of the House of Commons on the matter. A decade later, parliament included a provision in the Act of Settlement 1701 stating plainly that "no pardon under the Great Seal of England be pleadable to an impeachment by the Commons in Parliament".

After his release, Salisbury pursued a case in the High Court of Chancery concerning his wife's marriage portion under her father's will, as only £10,000 of a legacy of £20,000 had been paid. The dispute was about whether the amount should be reduced because Lady Salisbury had been under the age of sixteen when she married, a circumstance which the Executors to the will had agreed to. On 1 May 1691, the Court found in Salisbury's favour and ordered that he should receive a further £10,000, by way of a charge on his wife's sisters' estates.

In March 1693/94, John Dryden dedicated his new play Love Triumphant to Salisbury. His intention was probably to make a gesture of defiance to the new government, of which Dryden disapproved.

== Child and family ==
Salisbury's son and heir, James Cecil, 5th Earl of Salisbury (1691–1728), was born on 8 June 1691. James the 4th himself died on 24 October 1694, at the age of twenty-eight, to be succeeded by his infant son. His widow survived him until 1713.

Barely a month before Salisbury's death, his wife's mother, Mrs Bennett, had been murdered by a butcher who broke into her house.

Salisbury had five sisters, all of whom lived to marry. Lady Margaret Cecil (1672–1727) married firstly John Stawell, 2nd Baron Stawell (died 1692), and secondly Richard Jones, 1st Earl of Ranelagh. Lady Catherine Cecil (died 1688) married Sir George Downing, 2nd Baronet, in 1683. Lady Frances Cecil (died 1698) married Sir William Halford, 4th Baronet (died 1695), in 1692. Lady Mary Cecil (died 1740) married Sir William Forester KB (1655–1717). Another sister, Lady Mildred Cecil (died 1727), married firstly Sir Uvedale Corbet, 3rd Baronet (1668–1701), and secondly Sir Charles Hotham, 4th Baronet (ca. 1663–1723).

Salisbury's great-grandson, another James Cecil (1748–1823), was created the first Marquess of Salisbury in 1789; and his grandson, the third Marquess, was three times Prime Minister of the United Kingdom, between 1885 and 1902.

Peerage of England
Preceded by James Cecil	Earl of Salisbury; 1683–1694	Succeeded by James Cecil
