= Emily Nugent =

Emily Nugent may refer to:

- Emily Bishop, née Nugent, a fictional character from the British soap opera Coronation Street
- Emily Nugent, Marchioness of Westmeath (1789–1858), English courtier
