= Margaret Jones, Countess of Ranelagh =

English courtier

The Right Honourable The Countess of Ranelagh
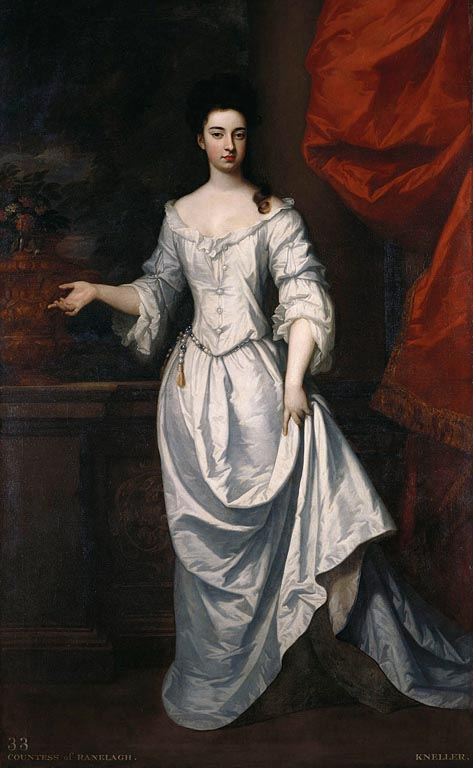
- Margaret Jones, Countess of Ranelagh
- Born: 1672/1673
- Died: 21 February 1728 (aged 55–56)
- Spouses: John Stawell, 2nd Baron Stawell; Richard Jones, 1st Earl of Ranelagh
- Issue: the Hon. Anne Stawell
- Father: James Cecil, 3rd Earl of Salisbury
- Mother: Lady Margaret Manners

Margaret Jones, Countess of Ranelagh (née Cecil; 1672/1673 – 21 February 1728) was an English courtier. She is one of the Hampton Court Beauties painted by Sir Godfrey Kneller for Queen Mary II.

== Family ==
Lady Margaret was the daughter of James Cecil, 3rd Earl of Salisbury and his wife Margaret, a daughter of the Earl of Rutland. Her father died in 1683 and by his will she became an heiress with a marriage portion of £10,000.

She first married John, the eldest son of Ralph Stawell, 1st Baron Stawell who succeeded his father as Baron Stawell in August 1689. The couple had one daughter Anne, who was less than a year old when her father died in 1692, leaving considerable debts. He was succeeded by his half-brother Wiliam. A bill was introduced into the House of Lords, which aimed to settle the estate to the statisfaction of the creditors and those, including Margaret and her daughter, with claims on the estate.

Margaret subsequently married Richard Jones, 1st Earl of Ranelagh (d. 1712) on 9 January 1696 as his second wife. As a wealthy widow Margaret was able to secure favourable terms from the negotiations for her second marriage, as was reported to Lord Lexington:

'The greatest subject of discourse at present is the Earl of Ranelagh's marriage with my Lady; Stawell; and the advantageous overtures he has made her, which is a jointure of 1600l. per annum rent charge, his house at Chelsea for her life, and his house near my Lord Halifax in fee, the liberty to dispose of 5000l. of her own estate, together with all her plate and jewels, and her pin money is made up 1000l. per annum. sides, her daughter is to live with her at my Lord's expense, so that the increase of her fortune is to be preserved to her.'

Margaret's second marriage produced no children. In February 1703 her husband was expelled from the House of Commons for embezzlement. Having lived an extravagant life, he died in poverty in 1712.

Her daughter Anne (3 August 1727) married firstly James Darcy, grandson of Conyers Darcy, 2nd Earl of Holderness and secondly John Baber, esq. of Sunning Hill Park, Berkshire.

Margaret died on 21 February and was buried at Chiswick on 5 March 1728.
