= James Gascoyne-Cecil =

James Gascoyne-Cecil or Gascoyne may refer to:

- James Gascoyne-Cecil, 2nd Marquess of Salisbury (1791–1868), English Conservative politician
- James Gascoyne-Cecil, 4th Marquess of Salisbury (1861–1947), Chancellor of the Duchy of Lancaster
- James Victor Gascoyne (1892–1976), English World War I flying ace

== See also ==
- James Cecil (disambiguation)
