= Dorothy Ashley-Cooper, Countess of Shaftesbury =

Dorothy Ashley-Cooper, Countess of Shaftesbury (c. 1656 – June 1698), formerly Lady Dorothy Manners, was the wife of Anthony Ashley-Cooper, 2nd Earl of Shaftesbury, and the mother of the 3rd Earl.

She was the daughter of John Manners, 8th Earl of Rutland, and his wife, the former Frances Montagu, herself a daughter of Sir Edward Montagu, 1st Baron Montagu of Boughton. Her brother John Manners, was created Duke of Rutland, and all five of her sisters married into the aristocracy: Lady Grace Manners married first Patrick Chaworth, 3rd Viscount Chaworth, and afterwards Sir William Langhorne, 1st Baronet; Lady Margaret Manners became Countess of Salisbury; Lady Frances Manners became Countess of Exeter; and Lady Elizabeth Manners became Countess of Anglesey. Lady Grace became Viscountess Chaworth, and Lady Anne became Viscountess Howe.

Lady Dorothy's marriage to the future earl, which took place on 22 September 1669, was supposedly negotiated by John Locke, a friend of the 1st earl, who had been tutor to his son. This arrangement does not seem to have lasted very long, and it has been suggested that the 2nd Earl was not a promising pupil. In 1672, when his father became an earl, Dorothy's husband (by now an MP) became known as Lord Ashley and she as Lady Ashley. They had seven children:

- Anthony Ashley-Cooper, 3rd Earl of Shaftesbury (1671-1713), who married Jane Ewer and had one son
- Hon John Ashley-Cooper (1672–1693)
- Hon. Maurice Ashley-Cooper (1675-1726), who married Catharine Popple and had no children
- Lady Frances Ashley-Cooper, who married Francis Stonehouse
- Lady Elizabeth Ashley-Cooper (died 1744), who married James Harris and had children including James Harris MP
- Lady Dorothy Ashley-Cooper (died 1749), who married Edward Hooper. Mother of Edward Hooper MP
- Lady Gertrude Ashley-Cooper (died 1704)

Locke was the family's physician and assisted at the birth of the couple's eldest son and also attended Dorothy when she suffered a miscarriage.

The 1st Earl, apparently dissatisfied with his son, arranged for his grandson, the future 3rd Earl, to be removed from his parents' care and taken to Locke for tutoring. After the 1st Earl's death, however, the boy was returned to his mother and father, now the 2nd Earl and Countess, and they sent him to Winchester College for his education.
