= Emily Cecil, Marchioness of Salisbury =

The Most Honourable The Marchioness of Salisbury
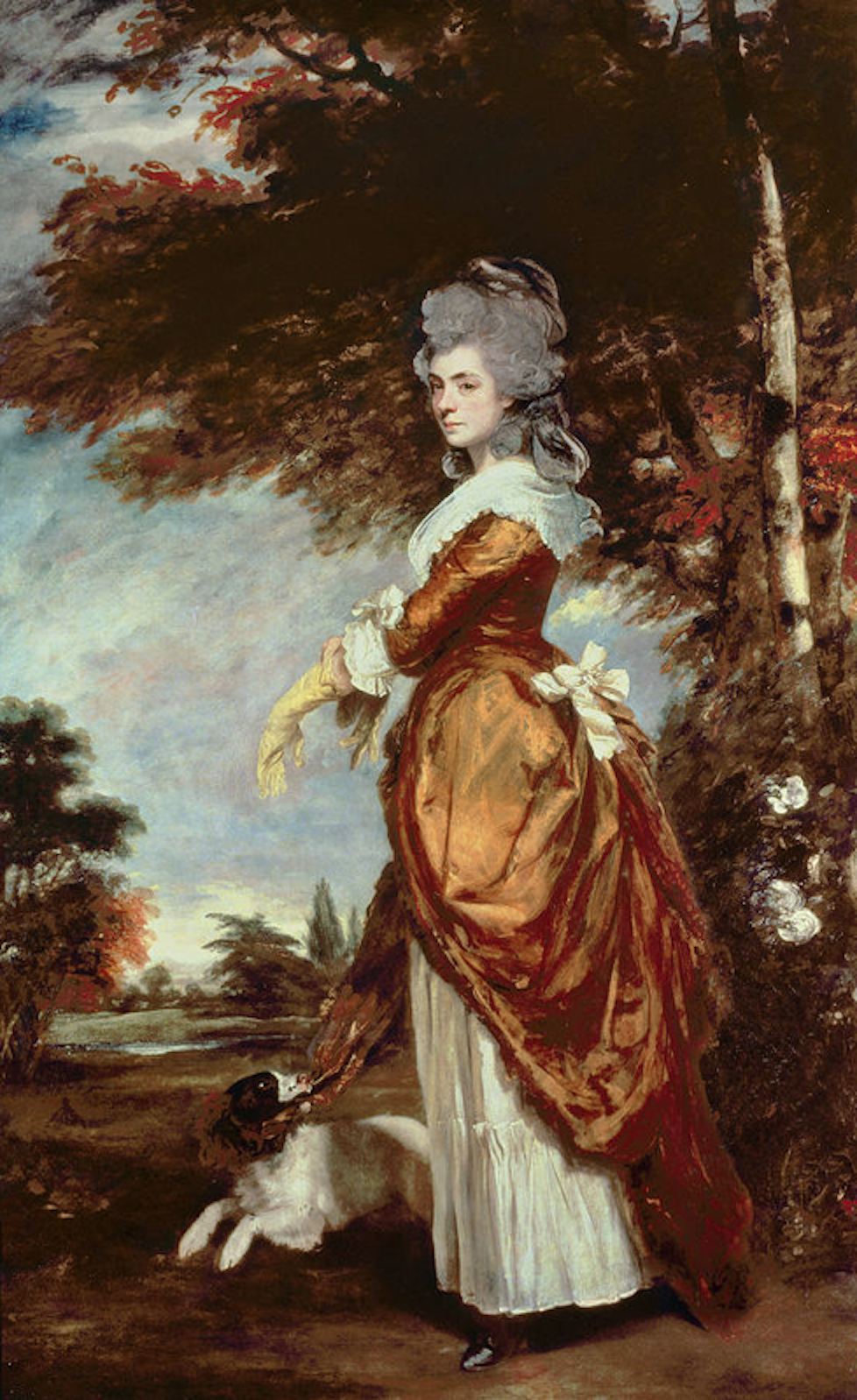
- Lady Salisbury, by Joshua Reynolds, 1780
- Born: The Honourable Emily Mary Cecil; 16 August 1750; Dublin, The Kingdom of Ireland
- Died: 22 November 1835 (Age 85); Hatfield House, Hertfordshire, The United Kingdom of Great Britain and Ireland
- Spouse: James Cecil, 1st Marquess of Salisbury (m. 1773)
- Children: 4, including Emily and James

Mary Amelia Cecil, Marchioness of Salisbury (16 August 1750 – 22 November 1835), known as Emily Mary Cecil, was an Anglo-Irish aristocrat, Tory political hostess and sportswoman.

The marchioness's eccentricity was frequently remarked upon, in particular her style of dress; her clothes were often of her own design.

== Early life ==
Emily Cecil was born in Dublin as Mary Amelia Hill, the daughter of Wills Hill, 2nd Viscount Hillsborough (later the first Marquess of Downshire), and his first wife, Margaretta Fitzgerald (1729–1766), sister of James FitzGerald, 1st Duke of Leinster. Her father was the Secretary of State for the Colonies under Lord North from 1768 to 1772, a critical period leading toward the American War of Independence.

== Life ==
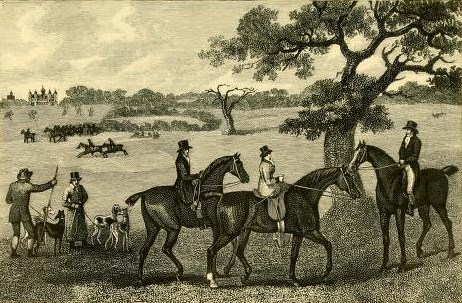
Coursing at Hatfield, an engraving by John Francis Sartorius, depicts the Marchioness riding side-saddle for hare coursing

Emily married James Cecil, Viscount Cranborne, the heir of James Cecil, 6th Earl of Salisbury, on 2 December 1773. After marriage, she became a prominent political hostess of the Tory party.

Unusually for a woman at the time, she not only took part in the sport of fox hunting but also became the first Englishwoman to serve as a Master of Foxhounds, taking over the command of the Hatfield Hunt from her husband in 1775.

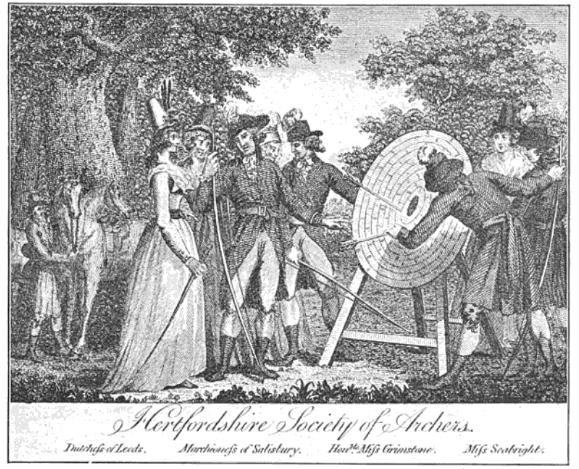
1791 illustration showing the Marchioness of Salisbury at a meeting of the Herfortshire Society of Archers (second from left of the group in the foreground)

Lady Salisbury was also a keen archer. She was appointed patroness of the Hertfordshire Archers and contributed articles on archery to the Sporting Magazine in 1792.

== Children ==
The couple had four children:

- Lady Georgiana Charlotte Augusta Cecil (d. 1860), married Henry Wellesley, 1st Baron Cowley
- Lady Emily Anne Bennet Elizabeth Cecil (d. 1858), married George Nugent, 1st Marquess of Westmeath and had issue
- Caroline Cecil, died young
- James Brownlow William Gascoyne-Cecil, 2nd Marquess of Salisbury (1791–1868)

== Death ==
Following her husband's death, Lady Salisbury continued to live with her son and grandchildren at Hatfield House, Hertfordshire, where she died in a fire on 27 November 1835 at the age of eighty-five. It was thought that feathers in her hat caught alight when she was at her writing-desk and caused the conflagration. The fire destroyed the west wing of the house and only a few bones of hers were found.
