= James Cecil, 5th Earl of Salisbury =

British nobleman, politician and peer (1691–1728)

The Right Honourable The Earl of Salisbury
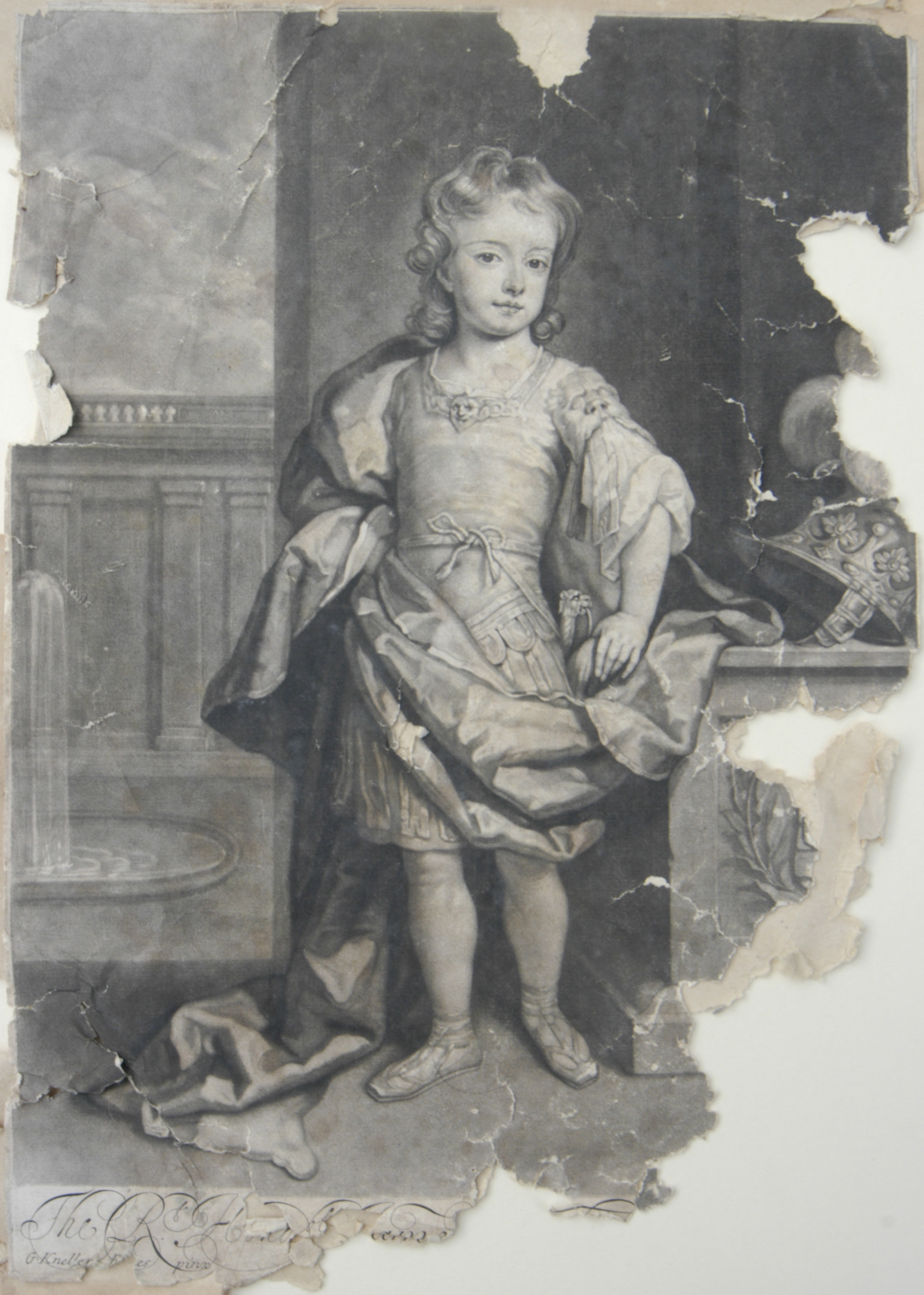
- James, 5th Earl of Salisbury. Mezzotint by and published by John Smith, after Sir Godfrey Kneller, Bt, 1696 (1695).
- Born: 8 June 1691
- Died: 9 October 1728 (aged 37)
- Spouse: Anne Tufton (m. 1709)
- Children: 4 (including James Cecil, 6th Earl of Salisbury)
- Parents: James Cecil, 4th Earl of Salisbury; Frances Bennett

James Cecil, 5th Earl of Salisbury (8 June 1691 – 9 October 1728), known as Viscount Cranborne from 1691 to 1694, was a British nobleman, politician, and peer.

Salisbury was the son of James Cecil, 4th Earl of Salisbury, and Frances Bennett, and succeeded his father in the earldom in 1694. From 1712 to 1714 he served as Lord Lieutenant of Hertfordshire. He sat as a Tory in the House of Lords and was a member of the Loyal Brotherhood.

Lord Salisbury married Lady Anne Tufton, daughter of Thomas Tufton, 6th Earl of Thanet, on 12 February 1709. They had four children:

- James Cecil, 6th Earl of Salisbury (1713–1780)
- Catherine Cecil (c. 1719–1752), married John Perceval, 2nd Earl of Egmont and had issue.
- Anne Cecil (c. 1728–1752)
- Margaret Cecil (died 1752) died, unmarried, of smallpox, at the Earl of Egmont's in Pall-Mall.

Lord Salisbury died in October 1728, aged 37, and was succeeded in his titles by his son James.

Lady Salisbury died in 1756. The Countess Anne school in Hatfield, founded in 1735, is named after her.

== Notes ==
Political offices
Preceded by The Earl Cowper	Lord Lieutenant of Hertfordshire; 1712–1714	Succeeded by The Earl Cowper
Peerage of England
Preceded by James Cecil	Earl of Salisbury; 1694–1728	Succeeded by James Cecil
