= James Cecil, 1st Marquess of Salisbury =

British nobleman and politician (1748–1823)

The Most Honourable The Marquess of Salisbury KG PC
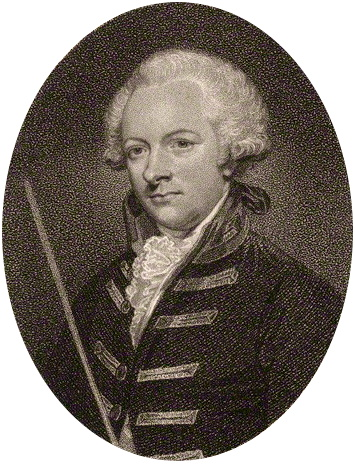

Lord Chamberlain
- In office 1783–1804
- Monarch: George III
- Prime Minister: William Pitt the Younger; Henry Addington
- Preceded by: The Earl of Hertford
- Succeeded by: The Earl of Dartmouth

Postmaster General
- In office 1816–1823 Serving with The Earl of Chichester
- Monarchs: George III; George IV
- Prime Minister: The Earl of Liverpool
- Preceded by: The Earl of Chichester; The Earl of Clancarty
- Succeeded by: The Earl of Chichester

Personal details
- Born: 4 September 1748
- Died: 13 June 1823 (aged 74)
- Spouse: Lady Emily Hill (m. 1773)
- Children: 4, including Emily and James Gascoyne-Cecil, 2nd Marquess of Salisbury
- Parent: James Cecil, 6th Earl of Salisbury (father)

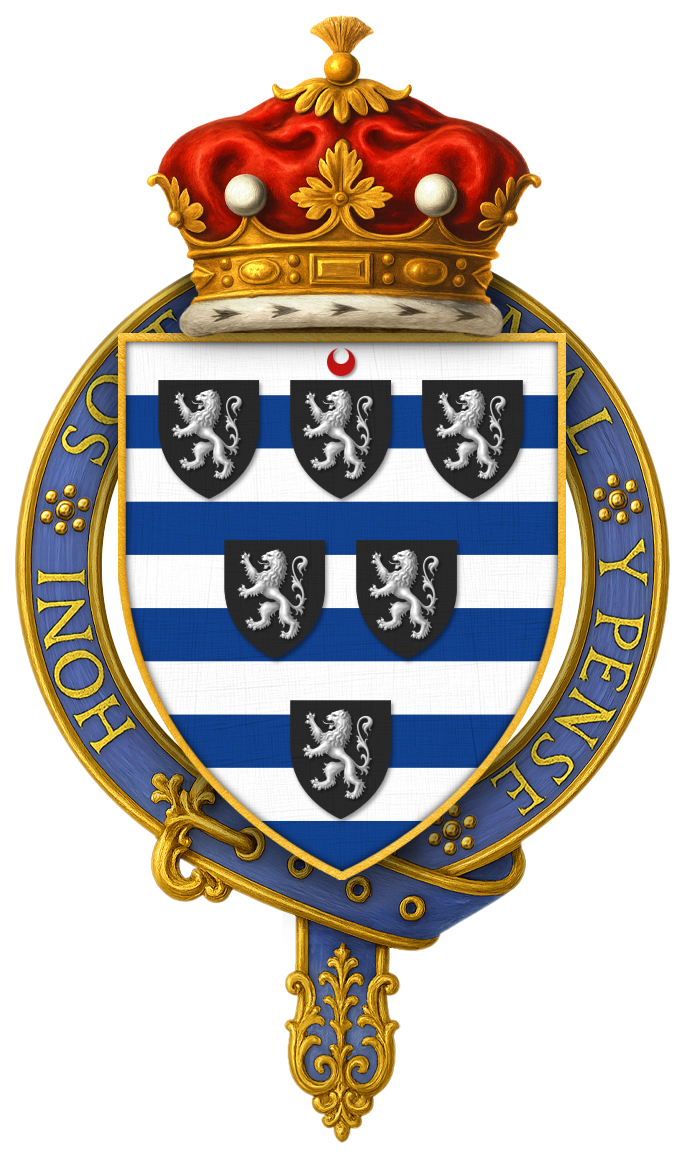
Coat of arms of James Cecil, 1st Marquess of Salisbury, KG, PC

James Cecil, 1st Marquess of Salisbury, KG PC (4 September 1748 – 13 June 1823), styled Viscount Cranborne until 1780 and known as the Earl of Salisbury between 1780 and 1789, was a British nobleman and politician.

== Background ==
Salisbury was the son of James Cecil, 6th Earl of Salisbury, and Elizabeth, daughter of Edward Keat.

== Political career ==
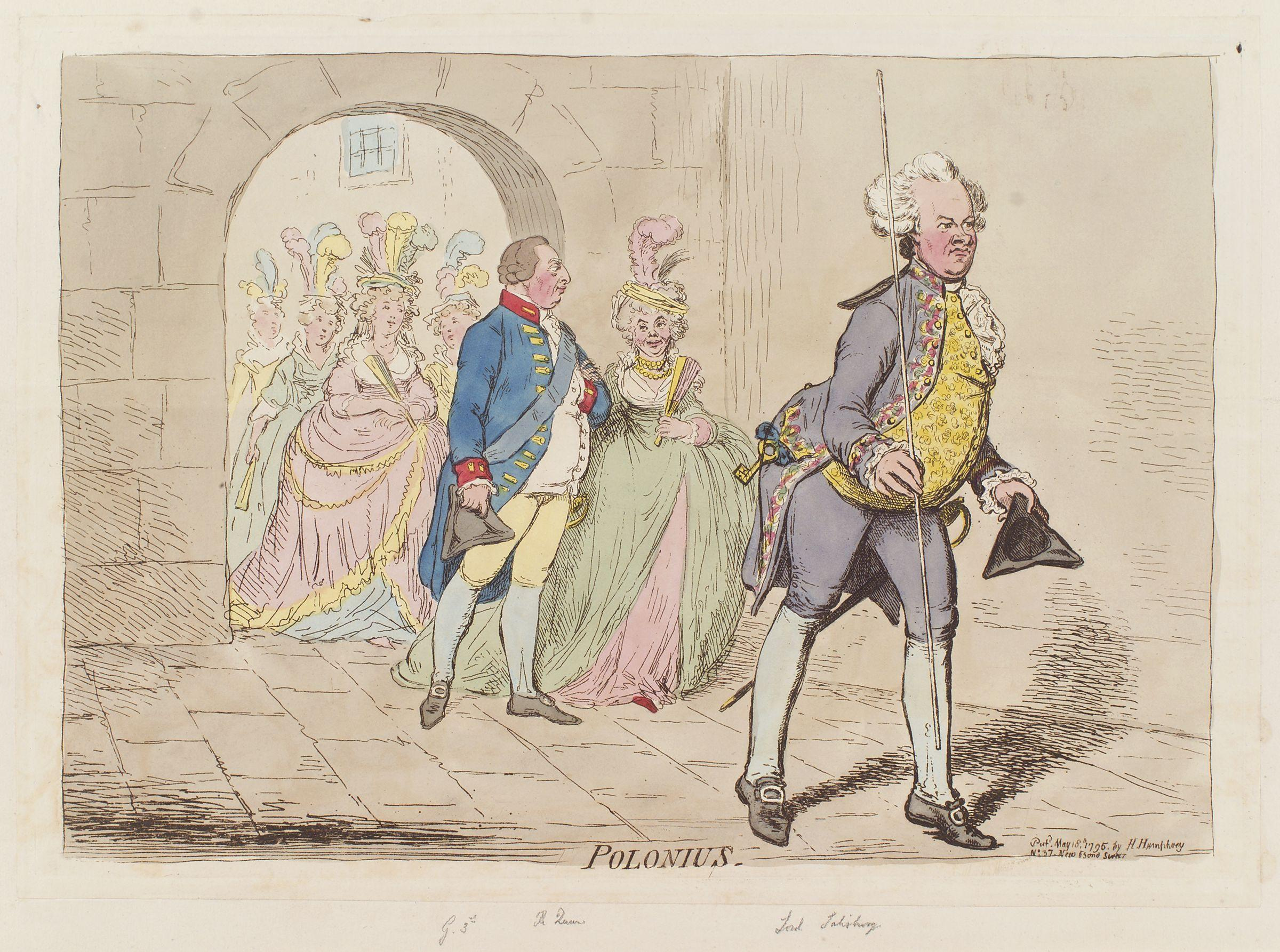
Lord Salisbury (in the front) with George III and Charlotte Sophia of Mecklenburg-Strelitz.

Salisbury was returned to Parliament for Great Bedwyn in 1774, a seat he held until 1780, and briefly represented Launceston and Plympton Erle in 1780. In the latter year, he succeeded his father in the earldom of Salisbury and entered the House of Lords. He served under Lord North as Treasurer of the Household between 1780 and 1782 and under William Pitt the Younger and then Henry Addington as Lord Chamberlain of the Household between 1783 and 1804. He was admitted to the Privy Council in 1780 and created Marquess of Salisbury, in the County of Wiltshire, in 1789. He later served as Joint Postmaster General under Lord Liverpool from 1816 to 1823. He also held the honorary post of Lord Lieutenant of Hertfordshire between 1771 and 1823. He was made a Knight of the Garter in 1793.

== Militia career ==
He served as Colonel of the Hertfordshire Militia in home defence during the War of American Independence. To help his discharged men re-enter civilian life at the end of the war, he employed 200 of them on the improvements he was making to his Hatfield estate. He was still in command of the regiment when it was called out again in 1793.

== Family ==
Lord Salisbury married Lady Emily Mary, daughter of Wills Hill, 1st Marquess of Downshire, on 2 December 1773. She became known as a sportswoman and influential society hostess. The couple had four children:

- Lady Georgiana Charlotte Augusta Cecil (1786–1860), married Henry Wellesley, 1st Baron Cowley (brother of the Duke of Wellington)
- Lady Emily Anne Bennet Elizabeth Cecil (1789–1858), married George Nugent, 1st Marquess of Westmeath and had issue
- Caroline Cecil, died young
- James Brownlow William Gascoyne-Cecil, 2nd Marquess of Salisbury (1791–1868)

Lord Salisbury died in June 1823, aged 74, and was succeeded by his only son, James. The Marchioness of Salisbury died in a fire at Hatfield House in November 1835.

== Notes ==
Parliament of Great Britain
| Preceded by The Earl of Courtown; Paul Methuen | Member of Parliament for Great Bedwyn; 1774 – 1780; With: Paul Methuen | Succeeded by Paul Methuen; Merrick Burrell |
| Preceded by Humphry Morice; John Buller | Member of Parliament for Launceston; 1780; With: Thomas Bowlby | Succeeded by Thomas Bowlby; Charles Perceval |
| Preceded by John Durand; William Fullarton | Member of Parliament for Plympton Erle; 1780; With: Sir Ralph Payne | Succeeded by Sir Ralph Payne; James Archibald Stuart |
Political offices
| Preceded by The Lord Onslow | Treasurer of the Household; 1780 – 1782 | Succeeded by The Earl of Effingham |
| Preceded by The Earl of Hertford | Lord Chamberlain; 1783 – 1804 | Succeeded by The Earl of Dartmouth |
| Preceded by The Earl of Chichester; The Earl of Clancarty | Postmaster-General; 1816 – 1823; With: The Earl of Chichester | Succeeded by The Earl of Chichester |
Honorary titles
| Preceded by The Earl of Essex | Lord Lieutenant of Hertfordshire; 1771 – 1823 | Succeeded by The Earl of Verulam |
Peerage of Great Britain
| New creation | Marquess of Salisbury; 1789 – 1823 | Succeeded by James Gascoyne-Cecil |
Peerage of England
| Preceded by James Cecil | Earl of Salisbury; 1780 – 1823 | Succeeded by James Gascoyne-Cecil |
