= Anne Cecil, Countess of Salisbury =

The Right Honourable; The Countess of Sailsbury
- Born: 9 August 1693
- Died: 22 March 1757 (aged 63)
- Spouse: James Cecil, 5th Earl of Salisbury (m. 1709; died 1728)
- Issue: James Cecil, 6th Earl of Salisbury; Catherine Cecil; Anne Cecil; Margaret Cecil
- Parents: Thomas Tufton, 6th Earl of Thanet; Catharine Cavendish

Anne Cecil, Countess of Salisbury (9 August 1693 – 22 March 1757), formerly Lady Anne Tufton, was the wife of James Cecil, 5th Earl of Salisbury.

She was the daughter of Thomas Tufton, 6th Earl of Thanet, and his wife, the former Lady Catharine Cavendish. She and her elder sister Catherine (later Viscountess Sondes) were friendly with Anne Finch, Countess of Winchilsea, whose poem "A Nocturnal Reverie" praises Anne. Anne was known to Anne Finch by the poetic pseudonym, "Lamira".

On 12 February 1709, Anne married the earl, who had succeeded his father in the earldom in 1694. They had four children:

- James Cecil, 6th Earl of Salisbury (1713–1780)
- Catherine Cecil (c. 1722–1752), married John Perceval, 2nd Earl of Egmont, and had children
- Anne Cecil (1719–1752), who married William Strode and had no children
- Margaret Cecil (died 1752), who died unmarried

The earl died in October 1728, aged 37, and was succeeded by their only son, James.

Anne's youngest daughter, Margaret, died in 1752 of smallpox, at the home of her eldest daughter, Catherine, Countess of Egmont, in Pall Mall, London. Another daughter, Anne, died later in the same year.

The Countess Anne school in Hatfield, founded in 1735, was named after the countess, but the original charity school closed in 1912, to be replaced by the current Church of England school.
