= Margaret Cecil, Countess of Salisbury =

English countess and wife of James Cecil

Margaret Cecil, Countess of Salisbury, formerly Lady Margaret Manners (d. c.1682), was the wife of James Cecil, 3rd Earl of Salisbury.

Margaret was a daughter of John Manners, 8th Earl of Rutland, and his wife formerly the Hon Frances Montagu. Three of Margaret's sisters, Frances, Elizabeth and Dorothy, became countesses. Another, Anne, became a Viscountess.

She married the future earl on 1 October 1661, seven years before he inherited his grandfather's earldom.

Their children, several of whom died in infancy, were:

- James Cecil, 4th Earl of Salisbury (1666-1694)
- Hon Robert Cecil (c.1670-1716), MP, who married Elizabeth Hale, widow of Richard Hale, and had children
- Hon William Cecil
- Hon Charles Cecil
- Hon George Cecil
- Lady Catharine Cecil (died 1688), who married Sir George Downing, 2nd Baronet, and had children
- Lady Frances Cecil (died 1698), who married Sir William Halford, 1st Baronet, of Welham, and had children
- Lady Mary Cecil (d. 29 Mar 1739/40), who married Sir William Forester and had children
- Lady Margaret Cecil (1672-1728), who married twice: her first husband was John Stawel, 2nd Baron Stawel of Somerton; her second was Richard Jones, 1st Earl of Ranelagh
- Lady Mildred Cecil (died 1727), who married twice: her first husband was Sir Uvedale Corbet, 3rd Baronet, of Leighton; her second was Sir Charles Hotham, 4th Baronet. She had children by both husbands.
