= James Cecil, 3rd Earl of Salisbury =

English nobleman and politician

The Right Honourable The Earl of Salisbury KG PC
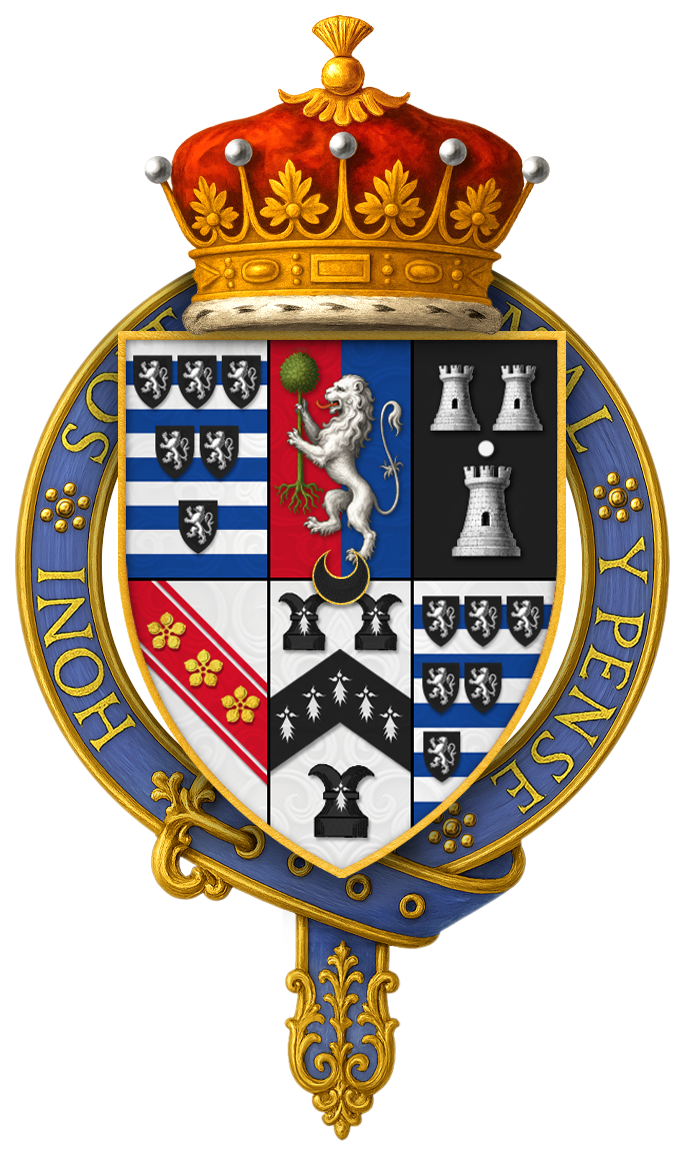
- Garter-encircled arms of James Cecil, 3rd Earl of Salisbury
- Born: 1648
- Died: June 1683 (aged 34–35)
- Spouse: Lady Margaret Manners
- Children: James Cecil, 4th Earl of Salisbury; Margaret Cecil, Countess of Ranelagh
- Parent(s): Charles Cecil, Viscount Cranborne; Lady Diana Maxwell

James Cecil, 3rd Earl of Salisbury, KG PC (1648 – June 1683), known as Viscount Cranborne from 1660 to 1668, was an English nobleman and politician.

== Biography ==
Salisbury was the son of Charles Cecil, Viscount Cranborne, the son of William Cecil, 2nd Earl of Salisbury. His mother was Lady Diana Maxwell. He is said to have attended St John's College, Cambridge. In 1668 he succeeded his grandfather in the earldom. He was invested a Privy Councillor in 1679 and was made a Knight of the Garter a year later, but was expelled from the Council a few months before his death due to his participation in the Rye House Plot.

On 1 October 1661, he married Lady Margaret Manners, a daughter of John Manners, 8th Earl of Rutland, and his wife formerly the Hon Frances Montagu.

He died in June 1683 and was succeeded in his titles by his eldest son James.

== Family ==
Lord Salisbury married Lady Margaret Manners, daughter of John Manners, 8th Earl of Rutland, in 1661. They had two sons, James and Robert Cecil (1670–1716), and a daughter Lady Margaret Cecil.

== Bibliography ==
- Leigh Rayment's Peerage Pages

Peerage of England
Preceded by William Cecil	Earl of Salisbury; 1668–1683	Succeeded by James Cecil
