= James Cecil, 6th Earl of Salisbury =

British nobleman, politician and peer (1713–1780)

The Right Honourable The Earl of Salisbury
- Born: 20 October 1713
- Died: 19 September 1780 (aged 66)
- Spouse: Elizabeth Keet (m. 1745)
- Children: 8 (including James Cecil, 1st Marquess of Salisbury)
- Parent(s): James Cecil, 5th Earl of Salisbury; Anne Cecil, Countess of Salisbury

James Cecil, 6th Earl of Salisbury (20 October 1713 – 19 September 1780) was a British nobleman, politician, and peer. He was the son of James Cecil, 5th Earl of Salisbury, and his wife, Anne Cecil, Countess of Salisbury. He was known for his irregular life as "the Wicked Earl", having a wife who separated from him and at least four mistresses.

He was educated at Westminster School, was High Steward of Hertford, and a Governor of the Foundling Hospital of London. He married in 1745 Elizabeth (1721–1776), daughter of Edward Keet of Canterbury, said by a contemporary source to have been a barber and a tourist guide. However, within a few years, he separated from his Countess and lived as a recluse with his mistress, one Mrs Mary Grave of Baldock, for the remaining 30 years of his life at Quickswood, in the parish of Clothall. His relationship with her predated his marriage. C. Price wrote of the liaison in 1771 (Hatfield House archives):

"He lives upstairs … surrounded with old trunks and boxes and scattered books. Well or ill he never quits his chamber, never sees or converses with any but his old Dame, as he calls her, and his physician, who occasionally visits him. The servants are old and rusty like the dwelling."

James Cecil died on 19 September 1780, having had by Elizabeth Keet one son, James Cecil, who succeeded as 7th Earl and 1st Marquess of Salisbury, and two daughters (who died unmarried).

Mrs. Grave received over £50,000 in his Will, besides jewellery, silver and furniture removed from Hatfield. In addition, the Earl bequeathed £43,000 to his seven children by her, one of whom was James Cecil Grave, rector of Hatfield and Clothall. The Will was unsuccessfully contested by the 7th Earl of Salisbury, who demolished Quickswood (c. 1790). Mary Grave died on 2 December 1789 at Baldock.

== Sources ==
- The Gentleman's Magazine
- Burke's Peerage and Baronetage, 106th edition
- G. E. C[okayne], The Complete Peerage (London, 1895)

Peerage of England
Preceded by James Cecil	Earl of Salisbury; 1728–1780	Succeeded by James Cecil
