= John Manners, 8th Earl of Rutland =

English politician and earl (1604-1679)

The Right Honourable The Earl of Rutland
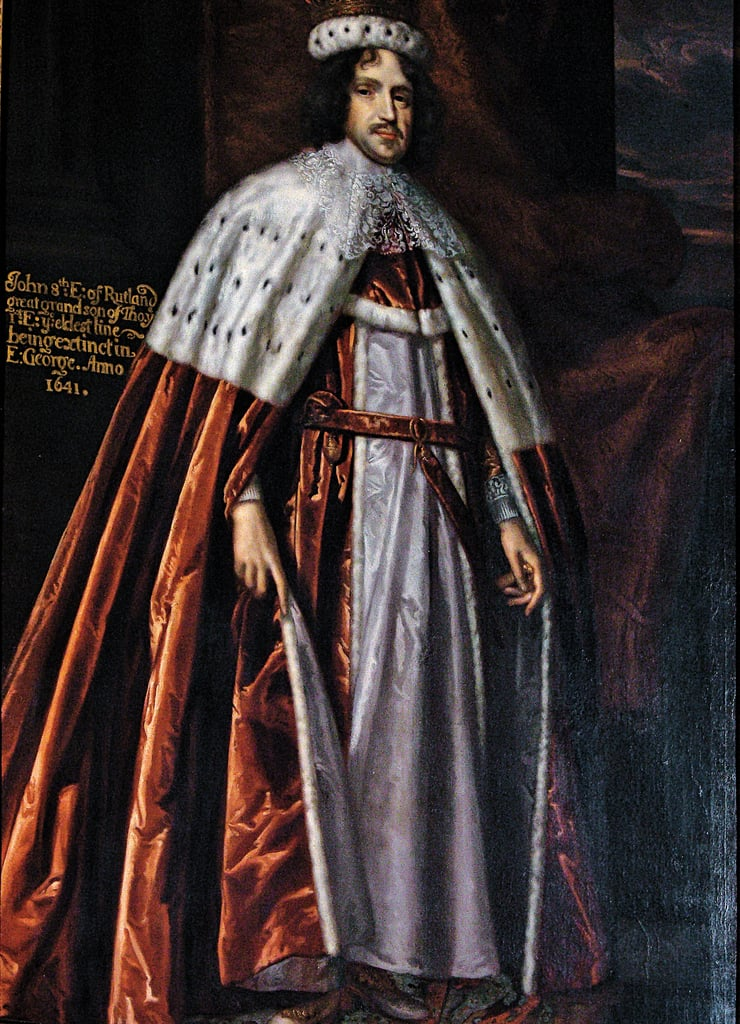

Lord Lieutenant of Leicestershire
- In office 14 February 1667 – 7 July 1677

Personal details
- Born: 10 June 1604
- Died: 29 September 1679 (aged 75)
- Education: Queen's College
- Resting place: Church of St Mary the Virgin, Bottesford, Leicestershire
- Spouse: Frances Montagu (m. 1628)
- Children: 7
- Parents: George Manners (father); Grace Pierrepont (mother)
- Relatives: John Manners (son); Margaret Manners (daughter); Dorothy Manner (daughter)

Arms of Manners: two bars azure a chief quarterly azure and gules in the 1st and 4th quarters two fleurs-de-lis and in the 2nd and 3rd a lion passant guardant

John Manners, 8th Earl of Rutland (10 June 1604 – 29 September 1679), was an English politician who sat in the House of Commons from 1640 until 1641 when he inherited the title Earl of Rutland on the death of his second cousin George Manners, 7th Earl of Rutland.

== Origins ==
He was the eldest son and heir of Sir George Manners (1569–1623) of Haddon Hall in Derbyshire, the eldest son and heir of Sir John Manners (bef.1535–1611), the second son of Thomas Manners, 1st Earl of Rutland of Belvoir Castle. His mother was Grace Pierrepont, a daughter of Sir Henry Pierrepont, MP, of Holme Pierrepont, Nottinghamshire. The 8th Earl was thus the great-grandson of Thomas Manners, 1st Earl of Rutland.

== Career ==
He was admitted at Queens' College, Cambridge, in spring 1619 and was awarded MA in 1621. He was admitted at the Inner Temple in November 1621. In 1632, he was High Sheriff of Derbyshire. In April 1640 he was elected a Member of Parliament for Derbyshire in the Short Parliament. In 1641, he inherited the title Earl of Rutland on the death of his second cousin George Manners, 7th Earl of Rutland. He was a moderate Parliamentarian and took the covenant in 1643. In 1646, he was Chief Justice in Eyre, North of Trent. After the Restoration of the Monarchy he was appointed By King Charles II as Lord Lieutenant of Leicestershire on 14 February 1667 and held the post until 7 July 1677.

== Marriage and children ==
Arms of Montagu: Argent, three fusils conjoined in fess gules

In 1628, he married Frances Montagu, a daughter of Edward Montagu, 1st Baron Montagu of Boughton, by whom he had one son and six daughters as follows:

- John Manners, 1st Duke of Rutland (1638–1711), son and heir
- Lady Grace Manners (died 15 February 1700), married firstly Patrick Chaworth, 3rd Viscount Chaworth, and after his death, married Sir William Langhorne, 1st Baronet; died less than a year after this second marriage
- Lady Margaret Manners (died 1682), married James Cecil, 3rd Earl of Salisbury, and had issue
- Lady Frances Manners (c. 1636–1660), married John Cecil, 4th Earl of Exeter, and had issue
- Lady Elizabeth Manners (c. 1654–1700), married James Annesley, 2nd Earl of Anglesey, and had issue
- Lady Dorothy Manners (c. 1656–1698), married Anthony Ashley-Cooper, 2nd Earl of Shaftesbury and had issue
- Lady Anne Manners (born 1655), married Scrope Howe, 1st Viscount Howe

In 1677, a legal case before the House of Lords ruled on a legal dispute between Manners and Scrope Howe over the financial settlement made for Lady Anne and her heirs.

== Death and burial ==
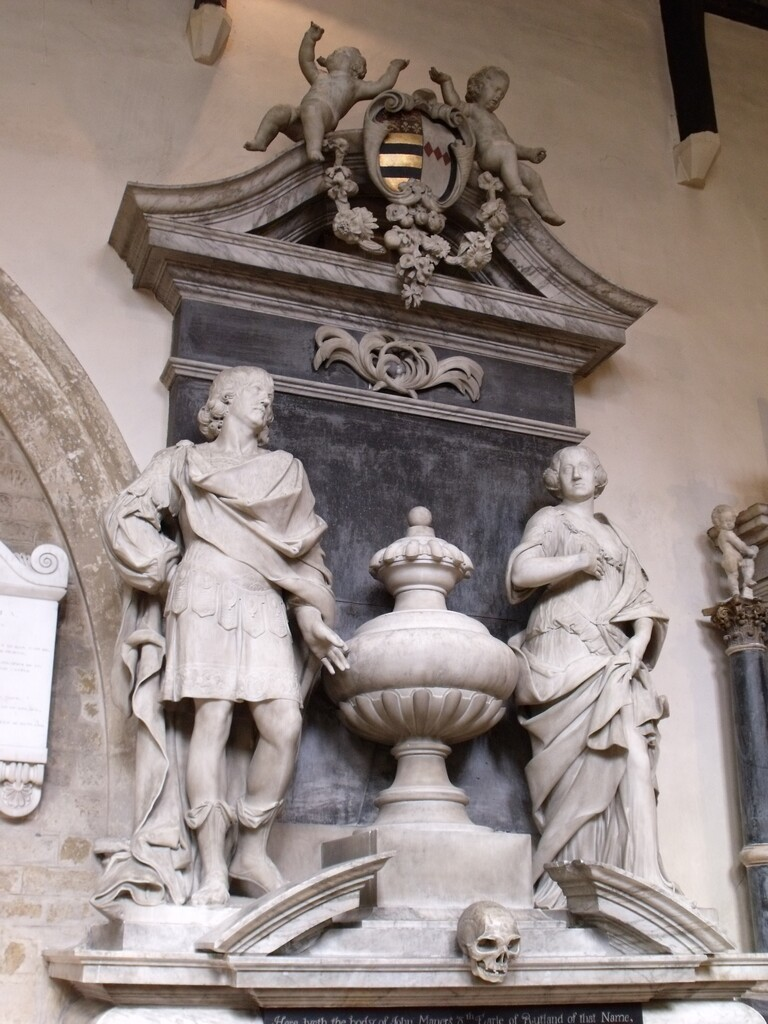
Monument of John Manners erected at St Mary the Virgin's Church in Bottesford

He died aged 75 and was buried in St Mary the Virgin's Church, Bottesford, Leicestershire, where survives his monument. He was succeeded in the earldom by his son John.

== Sources ==
- Archbold, William Arthur Jobson (1893). "Manners, John (1604-1679)" . In Lee, Sidney (ed.). Dictionary of National Biography. Vol. 36. London: Smith, Elder & Co.

Parliament of England
Vacant Parliament suspended since 1629	Member of Parliament for Derbyshire; 1640; With: Sir John Curzon	Succeeded by Sir John Curzon; Sir John Coke
Legal offices
Preceded by The Earl of Arundel	Justice in Eyre north of the Trent; 1646–1661	Succeeded by The Marquess of Newcastle
Honorary titles
Preceded by The Lord Loughborough	Lord Lieutenant of Leicestershire; 1667–1677	Succeeded by The Earl of Rutland
Peerage of England
Preceded by George Manners	Earl of Rutland; 1641–1679	Succeeded by John Manners
