= Latimer House =

Country house in Buckinghamshire, England

Coordinates: 51.6793°N 0.5556°W

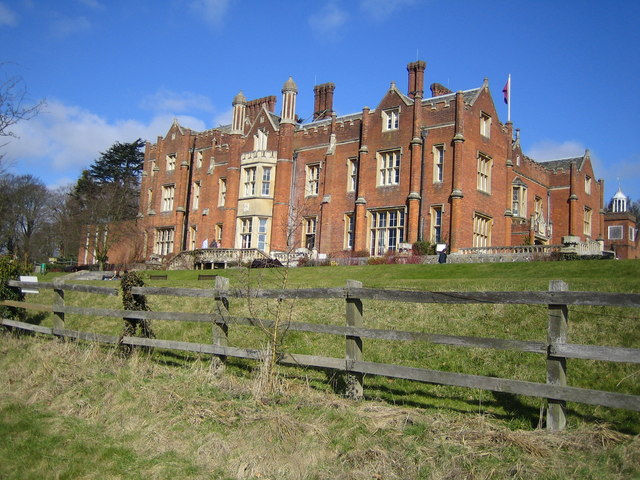
Latimer House in Buckinghamshire

Latimer House is a large country house at Latimer, Buckinghamshire. It is now branded as De Vere Latimer Estate and functions as a countryside hotel used for country house weddings and conferences. Latimer Place has a small church, St Mary Magdalene, which was built by Lord Chesham, in the grounds.

== The Cavendish family ==
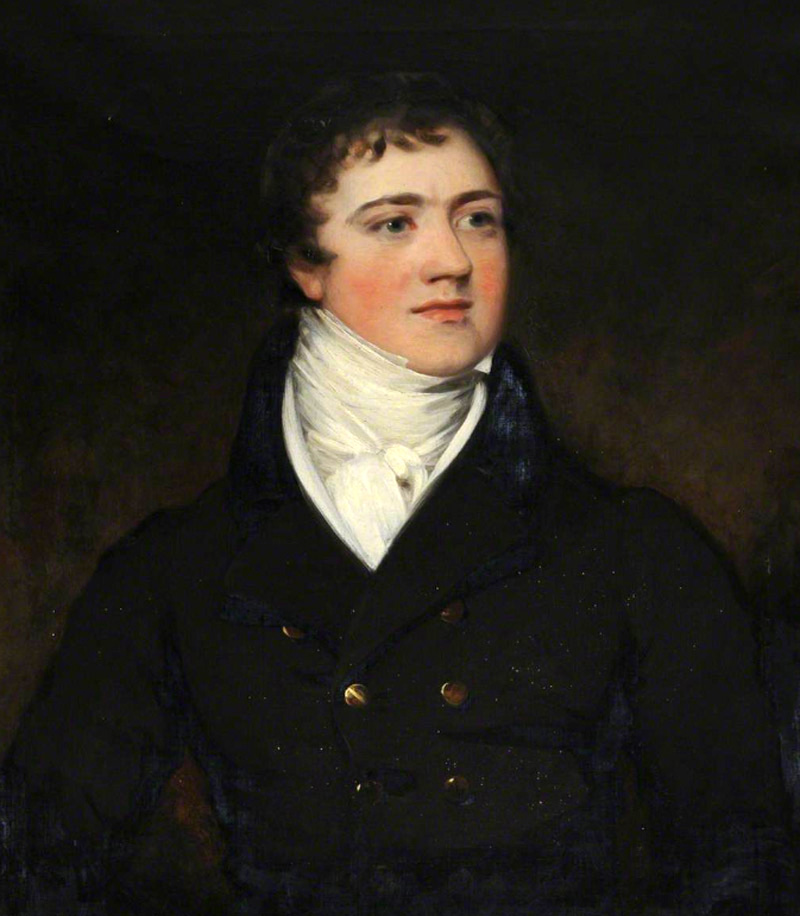
Charles Compton Cavendish, 1st Baron Chesham, who built Latimer House.

Latimer House, a mansion on the hill on the edge of the village, was once a home of members of the Cavendish family who became the barons Chesham. During the 17th century, Latimer Manor was the home of Christian Cavendish, Countess of Devonshire, then later of William Cavendish, 3rd Earl of Devonshire, and his wife, the former Elizabeth Cecil because Chatsworth House had been sequestered by Parliament. Their daughter, Anne Cecil, Countess of Exeter was born at Latimer and would later marry John Cecil, 5th Earl of Exeter, known as Lord Burghley, and would go living at Burghley House.

During the 18th century, the Manor was lived in by the wife of Elihu Yale, Catherine Hynmers Yale and their daughter, Ursula Yale. Both are buried in the small church on the estate. They rented the estate from their son-in-law Lord James Cavendish, son of the 1st Duke of Devonshire, and husband of Anne Yale. The 3rd Baron Chesham was a commander in the Boer War. The original Elizabethan house, where Charles I was imprisoned in 1647 and Charles II took refuge before fleeing abroad, was gutted by fire in the early 1830s and the present red brick Tudor style mansion, which was designed by Edward Blore, was completed in 1838.

The House was built by Charles Compton Cavendish, 1st Baron Chesham (1793-1863) in 1838. He was the son of Lord George Augustus Henry Cavendish and Lady Elizabeth Compton who was the daughter of the 7th Earl of Northampton. In 1814 he married Lady Catherine Susan Gordon, daughter of George Gordon, 9th Marquess of Huntly. The couple had three children, two daughters and one son. In 1818 he became a Member of Parliament and remained in this role for most of his life.

His father had inherited the Latimer Estate some time before and there had been an old manor house on the property. On his father’s death in 1834 the property had passed to Charles with the manor but in 1838 there was a fire which caused severe damage to the house. Charles commissioned the famous architect Edward Blore to build the new house which was completed in 1838 and still stands today. A newspaper of that time made the following comment about the property. It stated:

Mr Blore has fully sustained his character as the most skilful reviver of the domestic architecture of "Merrie Old England" in his admiral restoration of the quaint and picturesque Latimers.

Charles died in 1863 and his son William George Cavendish 2nd Baron Chesham (1815-1882) inherited Latimer House. He was educated at Eton College. He gained the rank of Officer in 1833 in the 10th Light Dragoons.

In 1847 he was elected Member of Parliament for Peterborough, a seat he held until 1852, and later represented Buckinghamshire from 1857 to 1863. He then succeeded his father in the Barony and took his seat in the House of Lords.

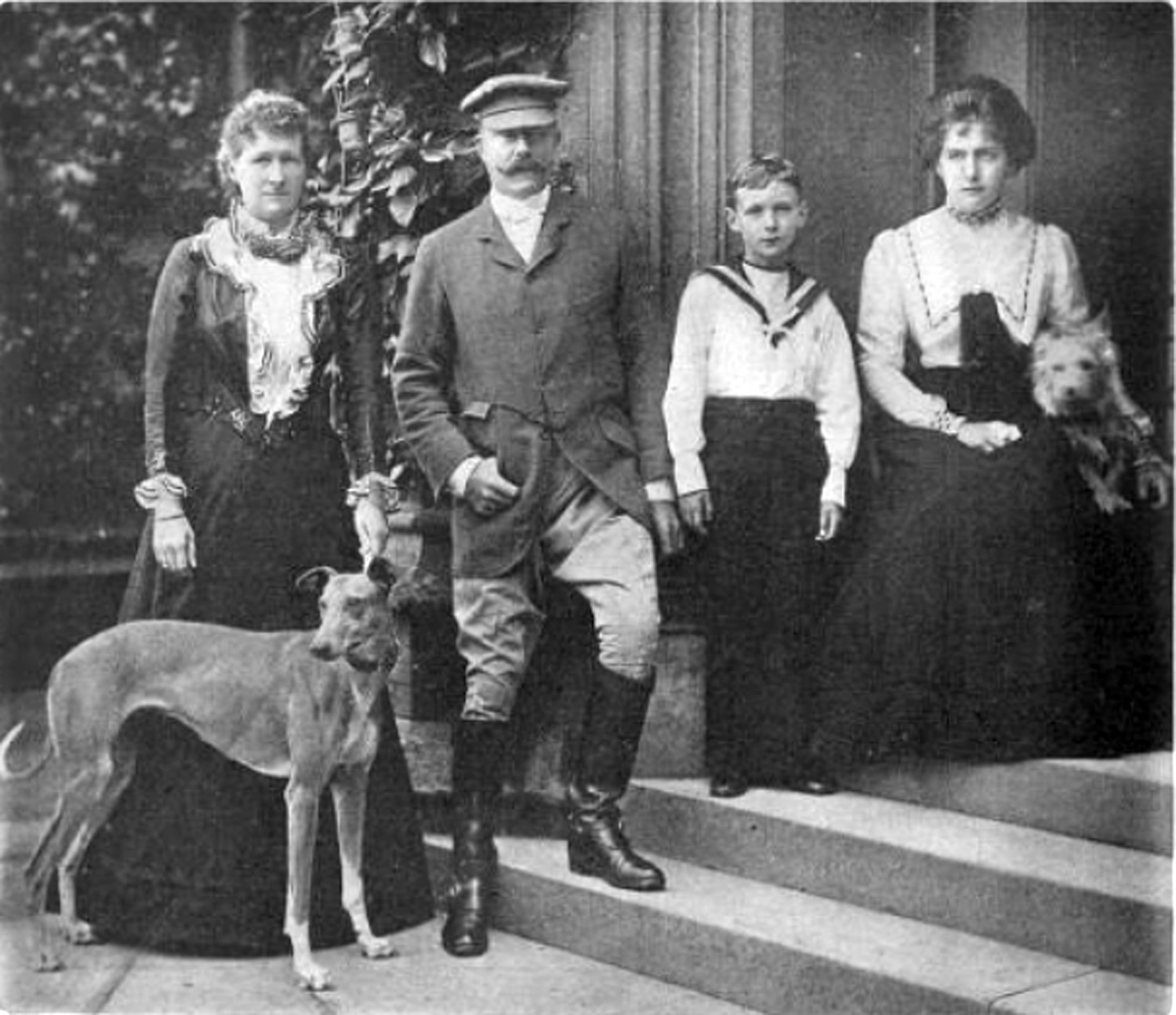
1901 Left to right:Lady Beatrice Cavendish, Major General Charles Compton William Cavendish, John Compton Cavendish (aged 7) Lilah Cavendish.

In 1849 William married Henrietta Frances Lascelles, daughter of William Saunders Sebright Lascelles and his wife Lady Caroline Georgiana Howard, daughter of George Howard, 6th Earl of Carlisle of Castle Howard. The couple had five children the eldest of whom was Major General Charles Compton William Cavendish (1850-1907) who became the 3rd Baron Chesham when his father died in 1882.

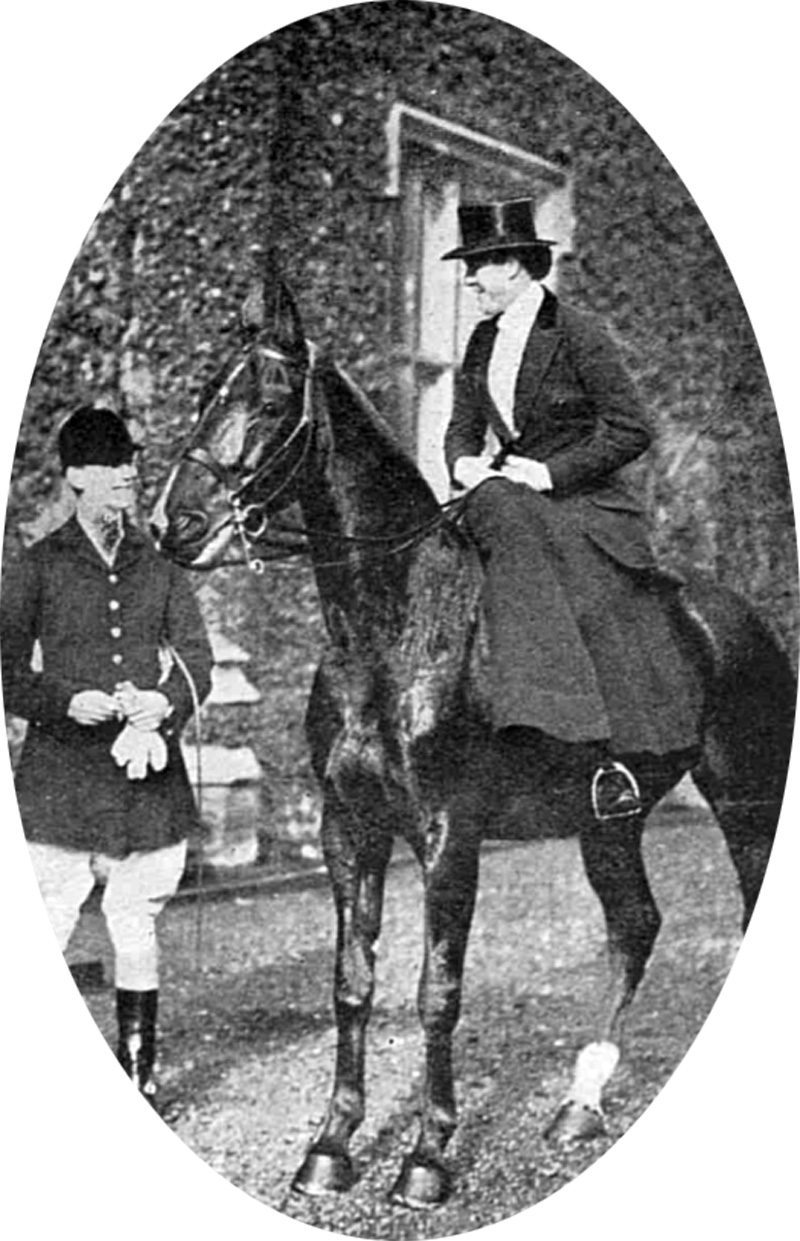
John Compton Cavendish in 1919

Major General Charles Compton William Cavendish was born in 1850 in London. He married Lady Beatrice Constance Grosvenor, daughter of Hugh Lupus Grosvenor, 1st Duke of Westminster of Eaton Hall, and Lady Constance Leveson-Gower, daughter of the 2nd Duke of Sutherland, on 13 November 1877. He had a very distinguished military career and fought in the Boer War where he received very favourable commendations. He had four children, one of whom was Lilah Cavendish. In 1903 Lilah was married at Latimer and the wedding was such a lavish affair that it was mentioned in numerous newspapers including some in Australia. The Australian paper gave the following description of the event:

The church being within the grounds of Latimer, the family seat of the Cavendish family, the bridal party walked to It, the bride being accompanied by, her father, who gave her away. She wore a gown of white chiffon over satin, tastefully trimmed with Brussels lace and orange blossom, and a white satin train veiled with lace and embroidered with silver. Her chief jewel was a diamond and pearl cross brooch given by the bridegroom, and she carried a lovely Goodyear bouquet of lilies of the valley and white roses.

The Gentlewoman magazine carried a large picture of the bridal party returning to Latimer House from the church after the wedding.

The 3rd Baron Chesham died in a hunting accident in 1907 when his horse stumbled while jumping a fence. His son John Compton Cavendish who was only 13 years old at the time became the 4th Baron Chesham.

John Compton Cavendish, 4th Baron Chesham (1894-1952), was educated at Eton College and later gained the rank of captain in the 10th Hussars. He fought in both the first and second World Wars and in the First World War was awarded the Military Cross.

== Second World War ==
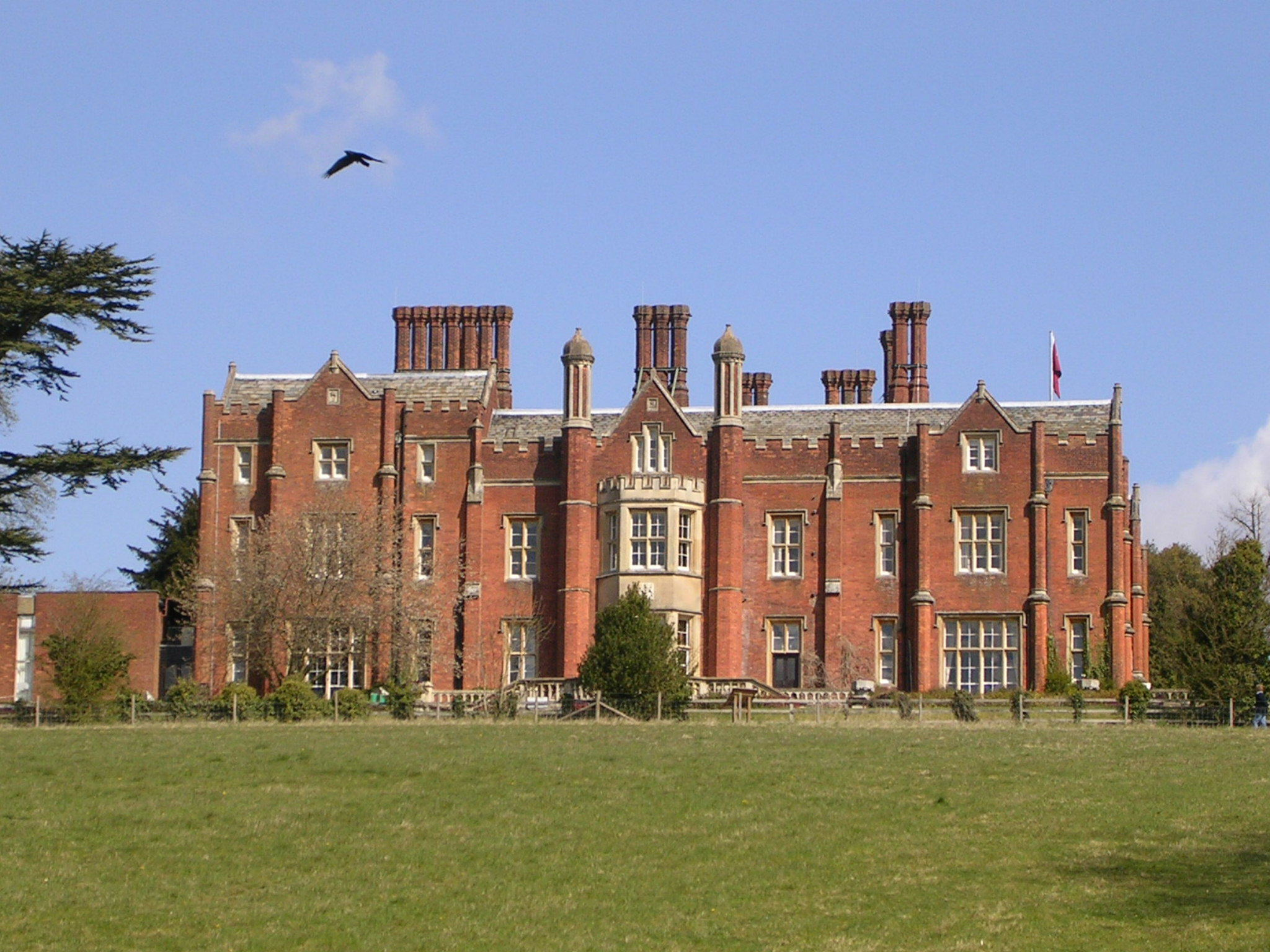
Latimer House, Buckinghamshire

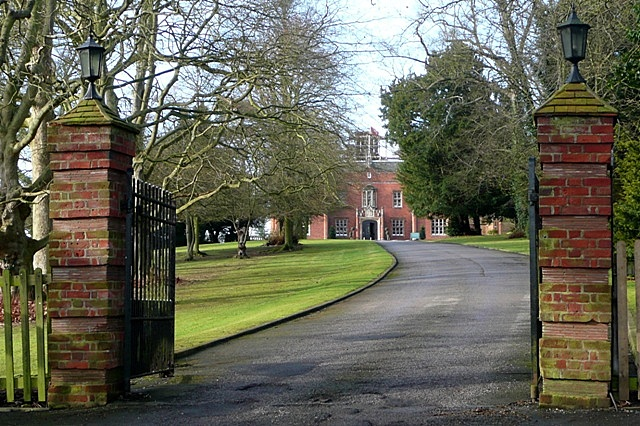
Entrance to Latimer House

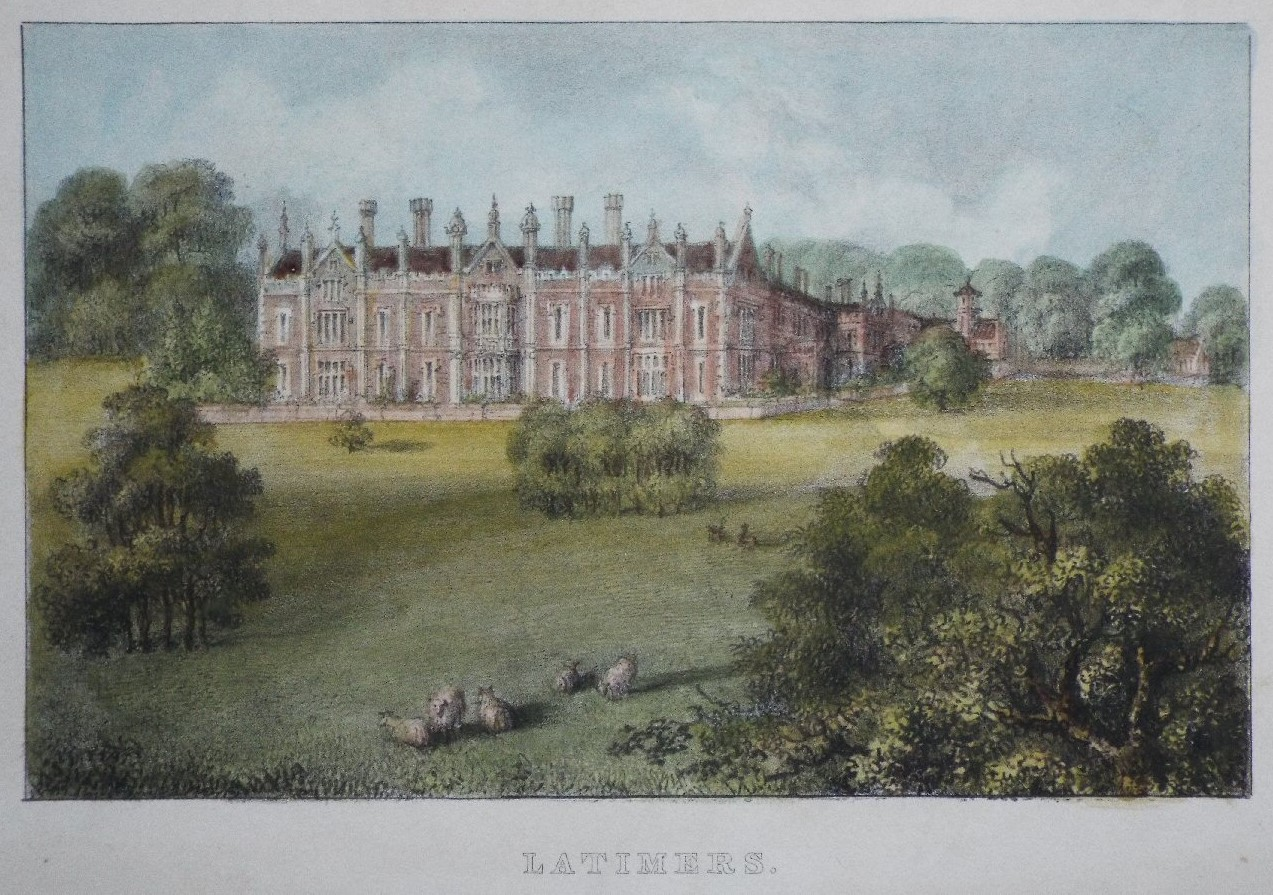
Latimer House, George Lipscomb; Quarto. 1831-1847

During the Second World War, the house was the headquarters of IV Corps from August 1940 and the centre of top secret activities by MI5 and MI6. It was also one of three stately homes where captured German U-boat submarine crews and Luftwaffe pilots were initially held before being transferred to conventional prisoner of war camps. The centre included the M Room, with special recording equipment, and the covert approach taken was kept in secret, even from parliament. They recorded private conversations between German prisoners and generals, giving away war secrets in the process.

One of the conversations overheard was about Hitler's V-1 flying bomb and V-2 rocket missile. The information was sent to Winston Churchill, who was also a frequent visitor of Latimer House, and London was saved from bombarding as they destroyed the German's missile base from afar. Hitler had the intention of launching 300 missiles a day on London. Today, Latimer is considered equal in importance to Bletchley Park for its role in the World War. When the estate was sold in the 1980s, a clause was added by the government to not open a secret wall in the basement for the next 50 years, as it also hides a secret tunnel used by top secret activities.

Over the course of the war, thousands of German prisoners, including Hitler’s Generals, would pass through Latimer House. They bugged the conversations of over 10,000 German prisoners-of-war, all recorded in over 100,000 transcripts, which are part of the National Archives. The operation of converting the estate for secret purpose was ordered by Churchill himself, with an unlimited budget, which in the end cost over 21 million pounds. The head of Latimer was Colonel Thomas Kendrick, a senior officer of MI6, who had about a thousand employees under his command, including listener Fritz Lustig.

Hitler's generals were often taken for a walk on the estate as way to extract information from them, and many were used to help the gardener dig the vegetable garden on the estate. Rudolf Hess, Hitler’s Deputy, the highest ranking German prisoner ever held by British Intelligence, is believed to have been held at Latimer. Colonel Kendrick was also involved in the training of the OSS for the United States, known as the Office of Strategic Services, which became the CIA. U.S. Ambassador John Gilbert Winant, who replaced Joseph P. Kennedy Sr., father of John F. Kennedy, had also his residence on the estate.

== National Defence College ==
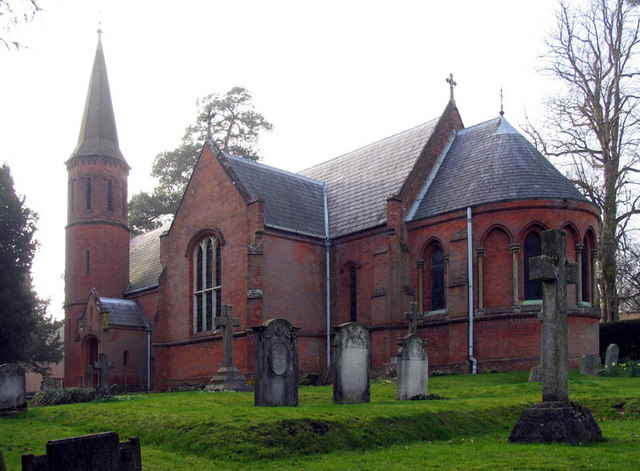
St Mary Magdalene Church

John Compton Cavendish, 4th Baron Chesham died in 1952 and a year later the house became the home of the British military's National Defence College. On 12 February 1974, a bomb containing about 20 lbs of explosive, was placed close to one of the main buildings at the National Defence College by the Irish Republican Army. At 9.10 am the bomb exploded injuring 10 people but with no fatalities. Damage estimated at over £6,000 was caused.

== Present day ==
Latimer Place is currently run as an independent hotel with conference facilities and branded the De Vere Latimer Estate. It was the subject of a TV documentary in the ITV series Britain's Secret Homes.

== Sources ==
- Newbold, David John. "British planning and preparations to resist invasion on land, September 1939 - September 1940". kclpure.kcl.ac.uk. King's College, University of London.
