= Order of Little Bedlam =

17th century gentleman's drinking club

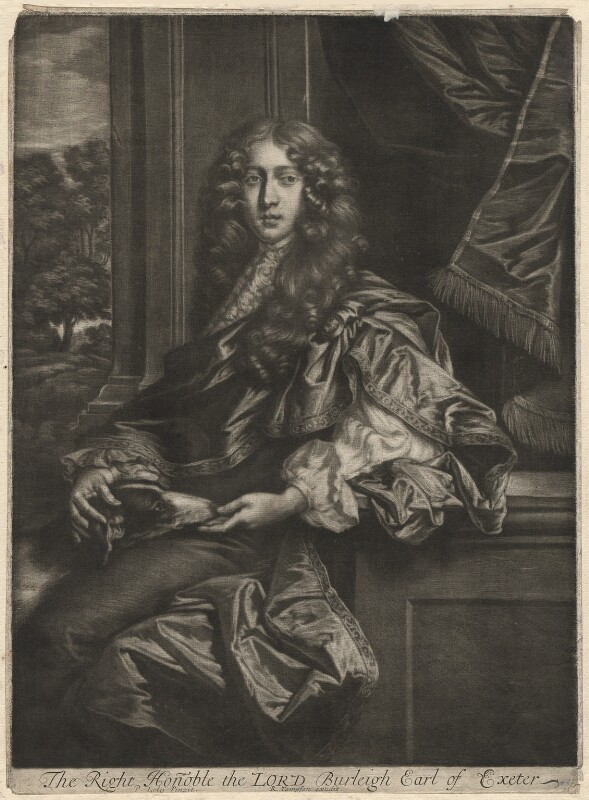
John Cecil, 5th Earl of Exeter

Order of Little Bedlam a.k.a. Bedlam Club was a gentlemen's drinking club, founded in 1684 by John Cecil, 5th Earl of Exeter of Burghley House, and lapsing on his death in 1700. In 1705 it was reconvened by his son, John Cecil, 6th Earl of Exeter as grand master ‘Lion’, his brother William as ‘Panther’, and brother Charles as ‘Bull’. Each member of the club had his portrait painted and was associated with a particular animal. The venue of the Club is thought to be "The Bull and Swan" at Stamford, Lincolnshire. The Billiard Room at Burghley House still displays six oval portraits of members of the 5th Earl’s drinking club.

A Burghley House document records details of the club in 1705:

The Honourable Order of Little Bedlam Whereas the Rt. Honble John Earl of Exeter lately deceased did in the Year 1684, (in the Reign of James 2nd) constituted a Society called, The Honble Order of little Bedlam at Burghley". Also, "Whereas no Chapter or Assembly of the members had been held since his Decease - There are to give Notice, That the Rt Honble John (now) Earl of Exeter intending to renew and continue the said Honble Society, did upon the 10th Day of May 1705 (in the Reign of Anne) call a chapter to be held at Burghley by some Members of the Society who were near at Hand, And, as great Master of the Order, did take upon himself the Title of Lyon - At which Chapter were elected and admitted into this Honble Society.". It further states "and amongst other things, it was also ordered that the former rules should stand, and that the register should give notice hereof to all such members as were formerly admitted, to know whether they are pleased to continue in this Honourable order and to give notice to the Register at Burghley (Daniel Clark) before the 15th day of May 1706 otherwise that their pictures would be taken and that the Great Master would proceed to a new election to fill up their places that the society might be kept full - and for this Notice and List to pay a Fee of 5s to the register.

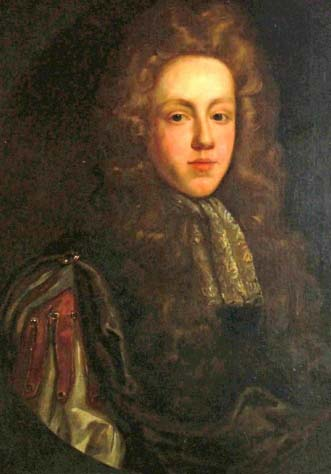
Sir Thomas Barker, 2nd Bart, of Lyndon Hall (1648-1707)

Members included:

- John Earl of Exeter, Great Master – Lyon
- Earl of Denbigh - Tyger
- Lord Lexington - Lamb
- Lord Howe - Hare
- George Crook Esq - Wolf
- Sir Thomas Barker (1648-1707) - Ram
- Hon. John Verney - Pardus [asterisked to indicated Male Panther]
- Henry Nevile - Fox
- Samuel Tryon Esq - Terrier
- Sir Godfrey Kneller - Unicorn
- Richard Sherard Esq - Mule
- George Leafield Esq - Guineapig
- Sir Thomas Mackworth - Badger
- Charles Tryon Esq - Otter
- William, Duke of Devonshire - Leopard
- Baptist Earl of Gainsborough - Greyhound
- Anthony Palmer Esq - Elephant
- Hon. John Noel - Wild Horse
- Hon. Charles Bertie - Stag
- Hon. James Griffin - Wild Boar
- Hon. William Cecil – Panther
- Thomas Hatcher Esq – Bear
- Antonio Verrio – Porcupine
- Sir James Robinson – Buck
- Timothy Lanoy Esq – Antelope
- Hon. Charles Cecil - Bull
- Sir Isaac Newton
- Gregory Hascard, Dean of Windsor – Cock

The temperamental Antonio Verrio, aptly named 'Porcupine', was responsible for a great deal of the very detailed art work in Burghley House. He quarrelled with most of the house occupants, particularly the cook, and painted her on one of the ceilings as the goddess of plenty, amply endowed with four extra breasts.
