= Lord Cavendish =

Lord Cavendish is the short form title of Hugh Cavendish, Baron Cavendish of Furness.

The men listed below were sons or brothers of the various Dukes of Devonshire, and were referred to as Lord [Forename] Cavendish as a courtesy title. It is not technically correct to refer to them as Lord Cavendish, without including their forename.

- Lord Henry Cavendish (1673–1700), British politician
- Lord James Cavendish (died 1741), British soldier and politician
- Lord James Cavendish (died 1751) (circa 1707–1751), British politician
- Lord Richard Cavendish (1752–1781), member of the Parliament of Great Britain
- Lord George Augustus Cavendish (died 1794), British politician
- Lord John Cavendish (1732–1796), English politician
- Lord Frederick Cavendish (soldier) (1729–1803), British field marshal and Whig politician
- Lord George Henry Cavendish (1810–1880), member of the United Kingdom Parliament
- Lord Frederick Cavendish (1836–1882), English Liberal politician
- Lord Edward Cavendish (1838–1891), British politician
- Lord Richard Frederick Cavendish (1871–1946), British aristocrat, author, magistrate and a politician
