= Charles Cecil (disambiguation) =

Charles Cecil (born 1962) is a British video game designer and co-founder of Revolution Software.

Charles Cecil may also refer to:

- Charles P. Cecil (1893–1944), US Navy admiral
  - USS Charles P. Cecil
- Charles Cecil, Viscount Cranborne (1619–1660), English nobleman and politician
- Charles Cecil (died 1726) (c. 1683–1726), English politician
- Charles Cecil (bishop) (c. 1695–1737), bishop of Bristol, and of Bangor
- Chuck Cecil (Charles Douglas Cecil, born 1964), American football coach and player

== See also ==
- Charles H. Cecil Studios, an art school in Italy
- Chuck Cecil (broadcaster) (1922–2019), Los Angeles radio broadcaster
