= Mary Cavendish, Duchess of Devonshire (1646–1710) =

The Duchess of Devonshire
- Born: 1646
- Died: 31 July 1710 (aged 63–64)
- Spouse: William Cavendish, 1st Duke of Devonshire
- Issue: Lady Elizabeth Cavendish; William Cavendish, 2nd Duke of Devonshire; Lord Henry Cavendish; Lord James Cavendish
- Father: James Butler, 1st Duke of Ormond
- Mother: Elizabeth Butler, Duchess of Ormond

Mary Cavendish, (nee Butler) was an English aristocrat from the Butler family.

== Biography ==
Mary Butler was born in 1646, the youngest daughter of James Butler, 1st Duke of Ormond and his wife, Elizabeth Butler, Duchess of Ormond.

In 1662 she married William Cavendish, 1st Duke of Devonshire, the marriage was very poor and the Duke was notoriously unfaithful, shocking his contemporaries. Very little is known of her life and her husband seems extremely controlling.

She died on 31 July 1710, choosing not to be buried with her husband, but with her family at Westminster Abbey.

== Family ==
With her husband, Mary had four children:

- Lady Elizabeth Cavendish (1670–1741), married Sir John Wentworth, 1st Baronet of North Elmsall, and had issue
- William Cavendish, 2nd Duke of Devonshire (c. 1672 – 4 June 1729)
- Lord Henry Cavendish (1673 – 10 May 1700)
- Lord James Cavendish (died 14 December 1751)
