= Anne Cecil, Countess of Exeter =

- Born: 1649
- Died: 1703 (aged 53–54)
- Spouse: John Cecil, 5th Earl of Exeter
- Issue: 9, including John, Charles, William
- Father: William Cavendish, 3rd Earl of Devonshire
- Mother: Elizabeth Cavendish, Countess of Devonshire

Anne Cecil, Countess of Exeter (c.1649–1703), was the wife of John Cecil, 5th Earl of Exeter.

== Biography ==
She was the only daughter of William Cavendish, 3rd Earl of Devonshire, and his wife, the former Elizabeth Cecil, and was born at Latimer, Buckinghamshire, the home of her grandmother, Christian Cavendish, Countess of Devonshire, where her parents were living at the time because their estate of Chatsworth had been sequestered by Parliament.

Her first marriage, in 1662, was to Charles, Lord Rich, son of the 4th Earl of Warwick. The couple had no children, and Lord Rich died in 1664.

She married John Cecil, 5th Earl of Exeter, then known as Lord Burghley, on 2 May 1670. Their son John, became the 6th Earl. Other children included Elizabeth (1687-1708), later Countess of Orrery.

The earl and countess lived at Burghley House, where the earl accumulated a large art collection as a result of his European travels. The countess joined her husband on two European tours in 1679-81 and 1699-1700. A portrait of her, by Godfrey Kneller, hung in the "brown dining room" at Burghley.
