= Lord James Cavendish (MP for Derby) =

British Whig politician

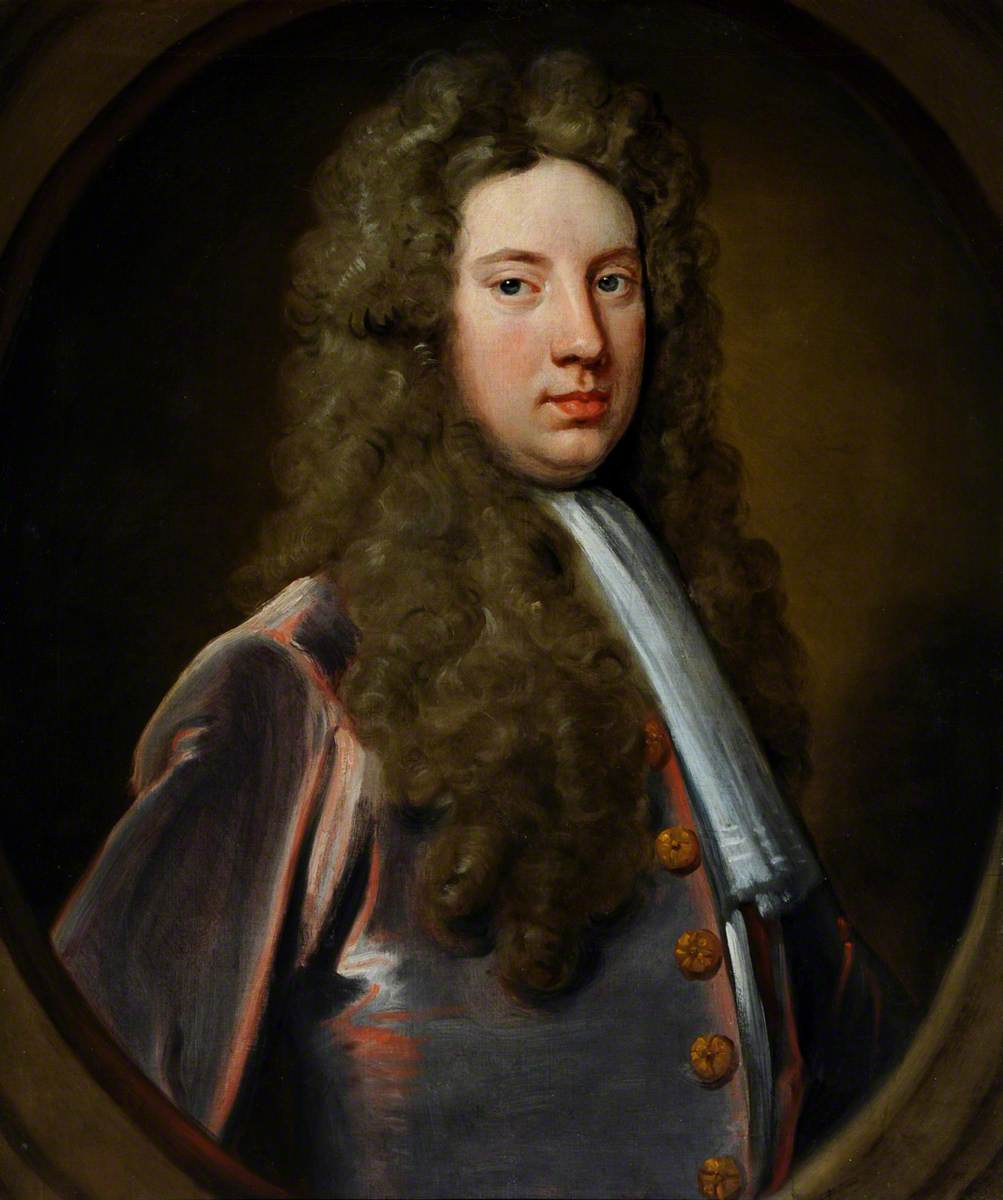
Portrait of Lord James Cavendish, painted by German artist Godfrey Kneller

Lord James Cavendish FRS (bef. 1707 – 14 December 1751) of Staveley Hall, Derbyshire was a British Whig politician who sat in the English House of Commons and the British House of Commons. He was a son of the 1st Duke of Devonshire and a member of the Cavendish family.

== Early life ==
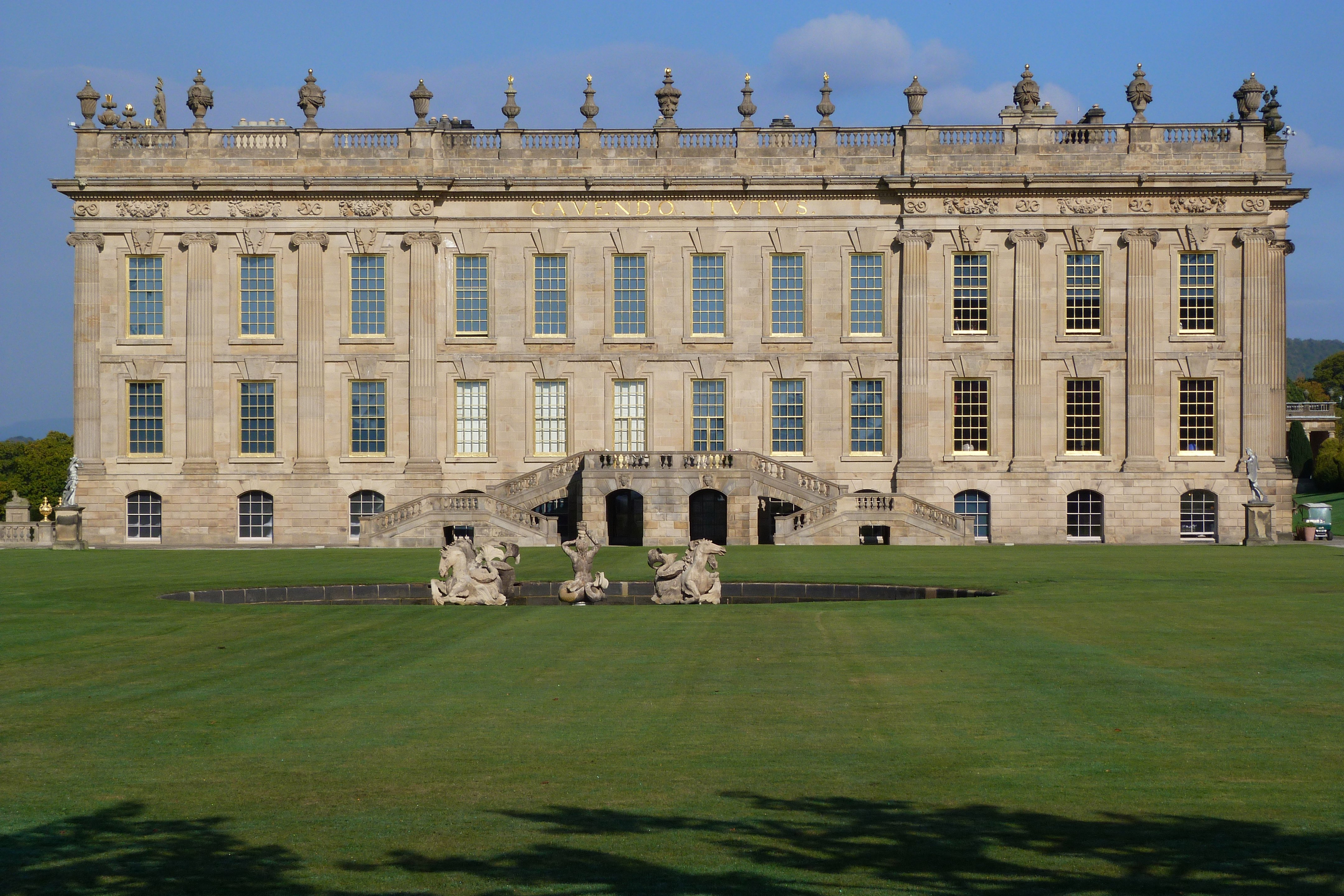
Chatsworth House, childhood home of Lord James, was inherited by his brother the 2nd Duke

Cavendish was the third son of William Cavendish, 1st Duke of Devonshire of Chatsworth House, member of the House of Cavendish, and his wife Lady Mary Butler, daughter of James Butler, 1st Duke of Ormonde of Kilkenny Castle, member of the Butler Dynasty.

James was a grandson of Countess Elizabeth Cecil of Hatfield House, member of the Salisbury's House of Cecil, a great-grandson of Countess Catherine Howard of Audley End House, member of the Ducal House of Howard, and a nephew of John Cecil, 5th Earl of Exeter of Burghley House, member of the Exeter's House of Cecil.

His father was part of the Immortal Seven who brought to power William of Orange as the new King of England, replacing the House of Stuart. At the death of his father, his brother inherited the Dukedom, becoming the 2nd Duke of Devonshire, and was married to Rachel Russell, Lady of the Bedchamber of Queen Anne and granddaughter of the 1st Duke of Bedford of Woburn Abbey. He travelled abroad in France and Italy from 1696 to 1698 and attended Padua University in 1697, in the region of Venetia.

== Career ==
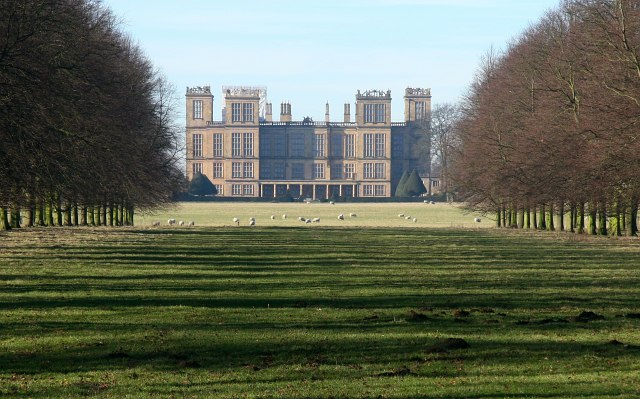
Hardwick Hall, an Elizabethan country house of his father, the 1st Duke of Devonshire

Cavendish was returned as Member of Parliament for Derby in both the general elections of 1701. He did not stand in 1702, but was elected in a contest at the 1705 English general election, defeating the sitting Tories. He voted for the Court Party candidate in the contest for Speaker on 25 October 1705 and supported the Court Party on the regency bill proceedings on 18 February 1706.

He was returned unopposed for Derby at the 1708 general election. He acted as a teller on the petition of defeated Whig candidates at Coventry and later voted for the naturalization bill in 1709 and for the impeachment of Dr Sacheverell in 1710. At the 1710 British general election, he was defeated in a contest for Derby and decided not to stand in 1713.

Cavendish was returned as MP for Derby at the 1715 general election and voted for the septennial bill in 1716 and the repeal of the Occasional Conformity and Schism Acts in 1719. He was returned unopposed at the 1722 and 1727 general elections. In the latter parliament he took an independent line, and voted against the government on the Hessians 1730, the army 1732, and the repeal of the Septennial Act in 1734, but with them on the Civil List 1729, and the Excise Bill 1733.

He was elected in a contest at Derby in 1734 and voted for the place bill 1740. He was returned unopposed at the 1741 general election, but on 8 March 1742 he vacated his seat to take up the post of Auditor of Foreign Accounts or Imposts in Ireland. He did not stand again for Derby at the ensuing by-election.

== Death and legacy ==
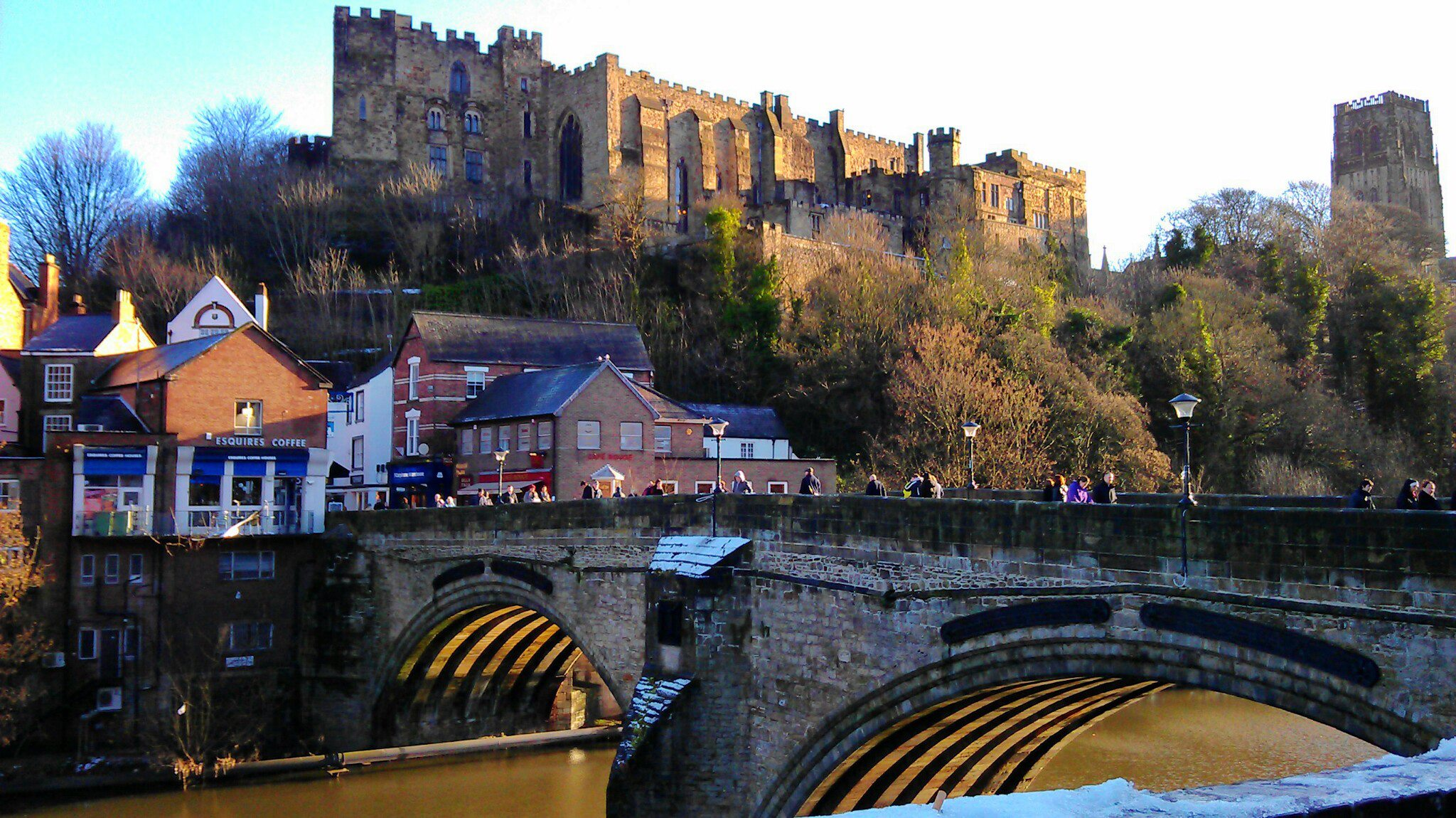
Durham Castle, seat of the Prince Bishop of Durham, his children married into this family

Cavendish married with £8,000 Anne Yale (died 1734), daughter of Governor Elihu Yale on 6 July 1708. Her sister married Dudley North.

They had two children:

- William Cavendish (died July 1751) who married Barbara Chandler, daughter of the Prince-Bishop of Durham, Edward Chandler of Durham Castle. They had no children, and his widow married secondly John Fitzwilliam, son of Richard Fitzwilliam, 5th Viscount Fitzwilliam and brother-in-law of Henry Herbert, 9th Earl of Pembroke
- Elizabeth Cavendish, married Richard Chandler in February 1722, one of the two sons of Edward Chandler

Chandler's Name Act 1751
- Act of Parliament
- Parliament of Great Britain
- Long title: An Act to empower Richard Chandler Esquire and Elizabeth his Wife, and their Issue, to take and use the Surname of Cavendish.
- Citation: 25 Geo. 2. c. 28 Pr.
- Territorial extent: Great Britain

Dates
- Royal assent: 26 March 1752
- Commencement: 14 November 1751 (Note: Start of session.)

Status: Current legislation

As his only son predeceased him by a few months, his heir was his son-in-law Richard Chandler, who subsequently adopted the name of Cavendish by a private act of Parliament, Chandler's Name Act 1751 (25 Geo. 2. c. 28 Pr.).

== Bibliography ==
- Leo van de Pas genealogies

Parliament of England
Preceded by Lord Henry Cavendish; George Vernon	Member of Parliament for Derby; 1701–1702; With: Sir Charles Pye 1701; John Harpur 1701–1702	Succeeded by John Harpur; Thomas Stanhope
Preceded by John Harpur; Thomas Stanhope	Member of Parliament for Derby; 1705–1707; With: Sir Thomas Parker	Succeeded by Parliament of Great Britain
Parliament of Great Britain
Preceded by Parliament of England	Member of Parliament for Derby; 1707–1710; With: Sir Thomas Parker 1707–1710; Richard Pye 1710	Succeeded by Sir Richard Levinge, Bt; John Harpur
Preceded by Edward Mundy; Nathaniel Curzon	Member of Parliament for Derby; 1715–1742; With: William Stanhope 1715–1722, 1727–1730; Thomas Bayley 1722–1727; Charles Stanhope 1730–1736; John Stanhope 1736–1742	Succeeded by John Stanhope; Viscount Duncannon
