= Mary Cavendish =

Mary Cavendish may refer to:

- Mary Talbot, Countess of Shrewsbury (1556–1632), née Mary Cavendish
- Mary Cavendish, Duchess of Devonshire (1895–1988), née Mary Gascoyne-Cecil
- Mary Cavendish, Duchess of Devonshire (1646–1710), née Mary Butler
- Mary Cavendish, the maiden name of the wife of John Fane, 7th Earl of Westmorland
