= William Cecil (died 1715) =

English politician (died 1715)

Member of Parliament for Stamford
- In office 1698–1705

Personal details
- Born: c.1676
- Died: 6 May 1715
- Parents: John Cecil, 5th Earl of Exeter (father); Anne Cecil, Countess of Exeter (mother)

William Cecil (bef. 1682 – 6 May 1715) was an English politician. He sat as MP for Stamford from 1698 till 1705.

== Biography ==
He was the second son of John Cecil, 5th Earl of Exeter and his wife, Anne Cecil, Countess of Exeter, making him the brother of Charles and John Cecil, 6th Earl of Exeter. He was educated privately by Matthew Prior.

Family records give his birth date as 1676.

He usually resided at his father's estate of Snape Castle and so he was sometimes referred to as 'William Cecil of Snape'.

He died unmarried.
