= Mary Campion =

Mary Anne Campion
- Born: 1687
- Died: 19 May 1706 (aged 18–19)
- Occupations: performer and mistress
- Known for: Child singer and dancer
- Partner: William Cavendish, 1st Duke of Devonshire
- Children: Mary Anne Cavendish

Mary Campion or Mary Anne Campion (1687 – 19 May 1706) was a successful English singer and dancer whilst still a child. She gave this up to be the mistress of the elderly William Cavendish, 1st Duke of Devonshire. After she died in 1706 the Duke paid for an extravagant tomb but did not attend the funeral.

== Life ==
Campion was born in 1687, her parents are unknown, but some believe that her father's employer was William Cavendish, 1st Duke of Devonshire's valet. She was a precocious performer and she was a member of Christopher Rich's company and she was singing on stage in 1698 in Phaeton. The range of her talents can be seen from her benefit night in 1703. She was fluent in Italian and she and Visconti played the harpsichord together, she sang songs by John Weldon and a duet by Henry Purcell with Richard Leveridge for an audience that included the Danish envoy.

She is thought to have given her last performance on 14 March 1704. William Cavendish, 1st Duke of Devonshire who was in his sixties installed her as his teenage mistress at a house he gave her in Bolton Street in Westminster despite already having a long term mistress, a number of children with her and of course Lady Mary Butler, his wife. They had a child named Mary Anne Cavendish before Mary Campion died of a fever on 19 May 1706. (Some say it was the childbirth) Cavendish surprised many by having her buried in the family church in an extravagant tomb. He did not attend her funeral and he died, some say in repentance, the following year.

Her memorial in the Latimer church reads "Her lovely form with every grace conjoined, illustrated the virtues of her mind". She left her house and all her goods and jewellery to her baby daughter in a will she wrote shortly before her death. They were to be converted into a fund that she would inherit when she was 21.
