= Catherine Cecil, Countess of Salisbury =

English countess (1590 - 1673)

The Countess of Salisbury
- Born: 1590
- Died: January 1673 (aged 82–83)
- Spouse: William Cecil, 2nd Earl of Salisbury
- Issue: 12, including Elizabeth and Charles
- Father: Thomas Howard, 1st Earl of Suffolk
- Mother: Catherine Howard, Countess of Suffolk

Catherine Cecil, Countess of Salisbury (c.1590 – January 1673), formerly Lady Catherine Howard, was a member of the House of Howard and was the wife of William Cecil, 2nd Earl of Salisbury of Hatfield House.

== Biography ==
She was a daughter of Thomas Howard, 1st Earl of Suffolk of Audley End House, and his second wife, the former Catherine Knyvett.

She married the future Earl of Salisbury on 1 December 1608. As Viscountess of Cranborne, she performed in The Masque of Queens in January 1609. She became countess when he inherited the earldom on his father's death in 1612.

In 1615, the countess was present at Trinity College, Cambridge, for the performance of Aemilia by students, in the presence of King James I of England. In 1617, the countess acted as godmother to James Murray, 2nd Earl of Tullibardine, the eldest son of Patrick Murray, 1st Earl of Tullibardine.

After Salisbury's retirement from public life, they made their home at Hatfield House. The countess's portrait was painted by Sir Peter Lely (some time after his arrival in England in 1641), and is held at Burghley House.

== Family ==
Her children, several of whom died in infancy, were:

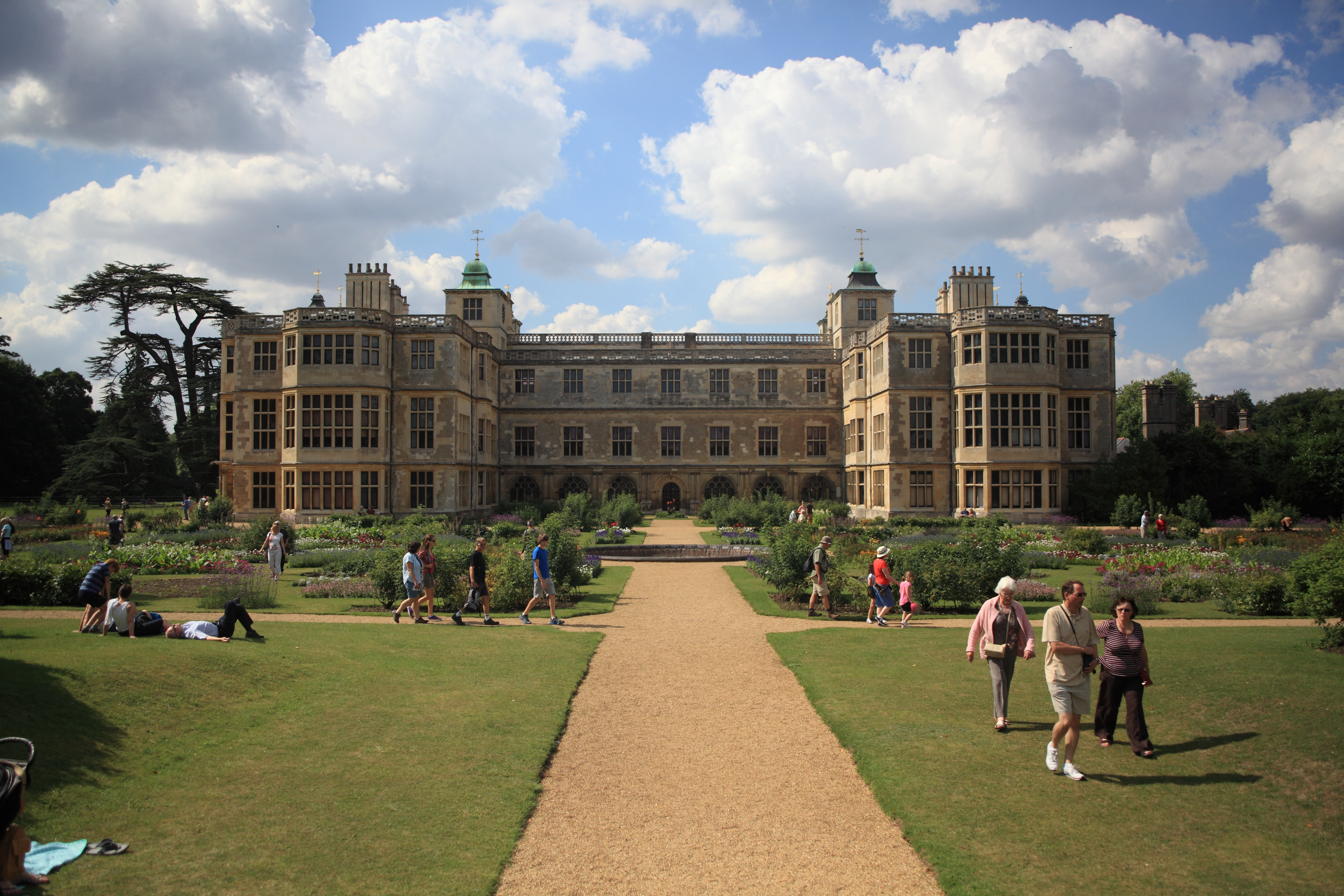
Audley End House

- Hon. Robert Cecil
- Hon. Philip Cecil
- Hon. William Cecil
- Hon. Edward Cecil
- Lady Anne Cecil (1612-1637), who married Algernon Percy, 10th Earl of Northumberland, and had children
- James Cecil, Viscount Cranborne (born and died 1616)
- Lady Elizabeth Cecil (1619-1689), who married William Cavendish, 3rd Earl of Devonshire, and had children
- Charles Cecil, Viscount Cranborne (1619-1660), who married Lady Diana Maxwell; their son became the 3rd Earl.
- Lady Diana Cecil (1622-1633)
- Lady Catherine Cecil (c.1628-1652), who married Philip Sydney, 3rd Earl of Leicester, and had children
- Lady Mary Cecil (c.1631-c.1676), who married William Sandys, 1st/6th Baron Sandys, but had no children
- Hon. Algernon Cecil (died 1676), who married Dorothy Nevile and had children
