= Gregory Hascard =

English priest (d. 1708)

Gregory Hascard DD (died 15 November 1708) was a Canon of Windsor from 1671 to 1684 and then Dean of Windsor from 1684 until 1708, but he was also a noted pluralist. He wrote three books on religious subjects.

== Life ==
Born in Grantham, the son of Thomas Hascard and Alice Hand, Hascard married Rachel Fane on 4 February 1667, at Gray's Inn Chapel, Middlesex (now London WC1).

Hascard was a member of the Order of Little Bedlam, a gentlemen's drinking club, founded in 1684. Portraits held at Burghley House by John Riley and Antonio Verrio painted him as god Bacchus are as a result of being a member.

In 1689 he bought the Baylis estate in the Parish of Stoke Poges and in 1696 had built Baylis House.

He was buried in St Giles's Church, Stoke Poges, where a monument was erected in his memory.

== Career ==
Hascard was educated at Emmanuel College, Cambridge, where he was awarded a BA in 1661, an MA in 1664, and a DD in 1671. Thereafter he held clerical appointments in plurality, as Rector of St Michael Queenhithe (1669–1671), Rector of Brickhill Bow, Buckinghamshire (1669–1671), Prebendary of Salisbury (1671–1708), Chaplain to the King (1677–1708), Rector of St Clement Danes (1678–1708), Rector of Bishops Stoke, and Rector of Great Haseley (1697–1708). He was appointed to the third stall in St George's Chapel, Windsor Castle in 1671, a position he held until 1684 when he was appointed Dean of Windsor.

== Publications ==
Hascard was the author of three published religious works:

- A discourse about the charge of novelty upon the reformed Church of England: made by the papists asking of us the question, where was our religion before Luther? (London: Printed for Robert Horn, and Fincham Gardiner, 1683.)
- A sermon preached before the ... lord mayor ... at the parish-church of St. Botolph, Aldgate (London: Walter Kettilby, 1685)
- A short examination of a discourse concerning edification, by Dr. Hascard, in a letter (London : A. Baldwin, 1700)
