= John Cecil, 7th Earl of Exeter =

English peer

John Cecil, 7th Earl of Exeter (c. 1700–1722) was an English peer and member of the House of Lords, styled Lord Burghley from 1721 to 1722.

He inherited the earldom in 1721. His parents were John Cecil, 6th Earl of Exeter, and Elizabeth Brownlow, daughter of Sir John Brownlow, 3rd Baronet. He was Keeper of the Westhay Walk, Bailiwick of Cliffe, Rockingham Forest. He was succeeded by his brother, Brownlow Cecil, 8th Earl of Exeter.

Peerage of England
| Preceded by John Cecil | Earl of Exeter; 1721–1722 | Succeeded by Brownlow Cecil |
