= William Cecil, 2nd Earl of Salisbury =

English earl (1591–1668)

The Right Honourable The Earl of Salisbury KG, PC, MP
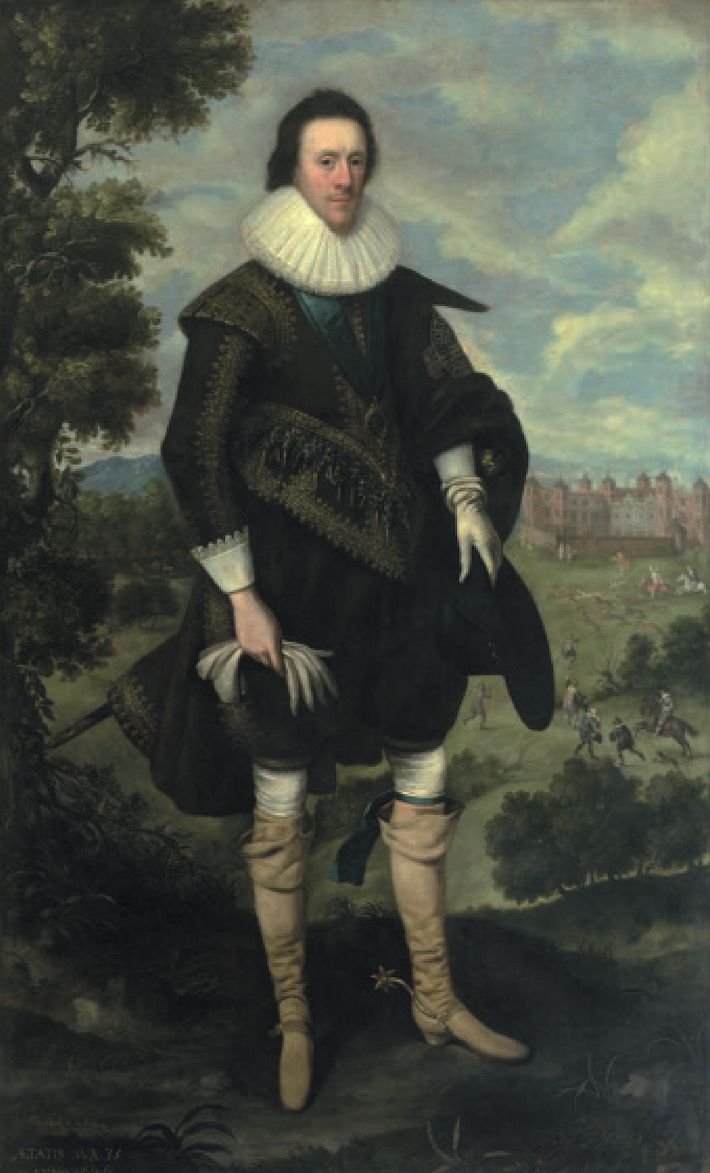
- The 2nd Earl of Salisbury by George Geldorp.
- Born: 28 March 1591
- Died: 3 December 1668 (aged 77); Hatfield House
- Spouse: Lady Catherine Howard
- Children: 12 (including Charles Cecil, Viscount Cranborne and Elizabeth Cavendish, Countess of Devonshire)
- Parent(s): Robert Cecil, 1st Earl of Salisbury; Elizabeth Brooke

William Cecil, 2nd Earl of Salisbury, KG, PC, MP (28 March 1591 – 3 December 1668), known as Viscount Cranborne from 1605 to 1612, was an English peer, nobleman, and politician.

== Early years, 1591–1612 ==
Cecil was the son of Robert Cecil, 1st Earl of Salisbury and Elizabeth (née Brooke), the daughter of William Brooke, 10th Baron Cobham. He was born in Westminster on 28 March 1591 and baptized in St Clement Danes on 11 April. William's mother died when he was six years old, and he was subsequently raised by his aunt, Lady Frances Stourton.

In January 1600 Queen Elizabeth gave him a coat, a girdle and dagger, a hat with a feather, and a jewel to wear on it. He was educated at Sherborne School and at St John's College, Cambridge, where he started his terms in 1602, at age eleven. In 1603 Anne of Denmark held court at Worksop Manor on the king's birthday, 19 June. She tied a jewel in William's ear, and he danced with Princess Elizabeth.

James I raised Cecil's father to the Peerage of England, creating him Baron Cecil in 1603; Viscount Cranborne in 1604; and Earl of Salisbury in 1605. As a result, in 1605, William received the courtesy title of Viscount Cranborne. In 1608, aged 17, Cranborne's father sent him to France, but quickly recalled him to England to marry Catherine, the daughter of Thomas Howard, 1st Earl of Suffolk in December 1608. His father was determined that Cranborne should spend two years living abroad, and instructed him to return to France following his marriage. However, in mid-1610, James I determined to have his son Henry installed as Prince of Wales and Salisbury (who was currently serving as Lord High Treasurer) instructed his son to return for the ceremony: Cranborne subsequently held the king's train for the ceremony. Following this ceremony, Cranborne returned to Europe, this time to Italy, travelling first to Venice, then to Padua. At Padua, he fell ill, and returned to England resolving never to go abroad again.

== Early years as Earl of Salisbury, 1612–1640 ==
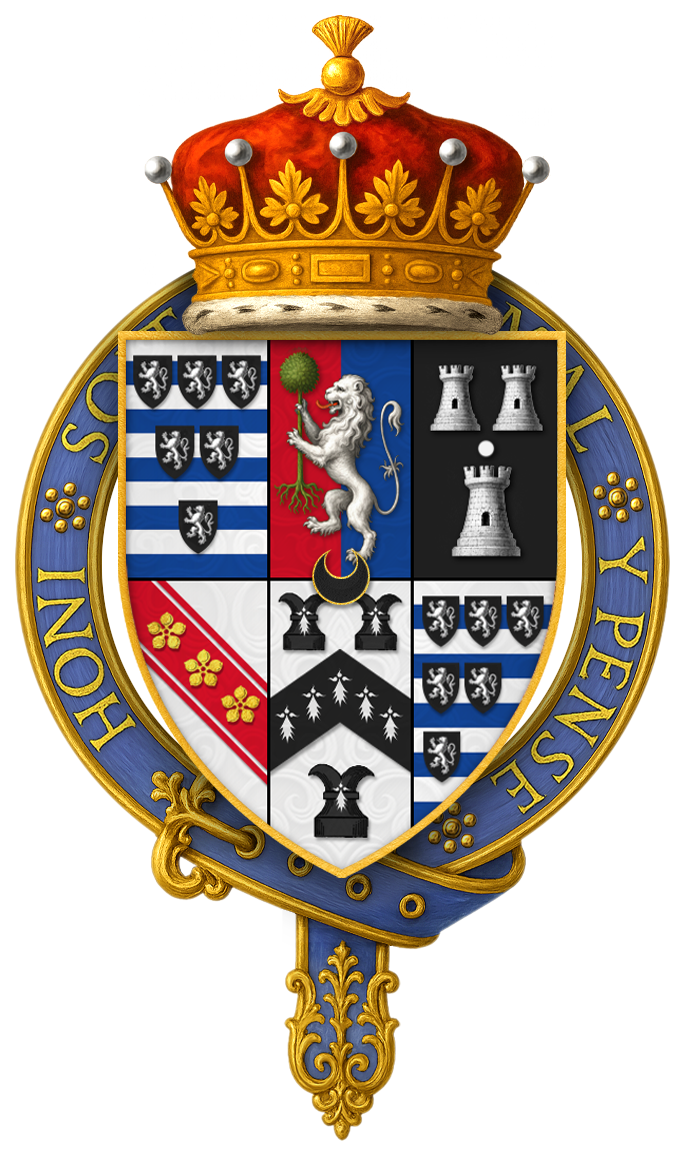
Arms of Sir William Cecil, 2nd Earl of Salisbury, KG

Cranborne's father died in 1612, making him the 2nd Earl of Salisbury. He took part in The Somerset Masque in December 1613. Salisbury was soon named Lord Lieutenant of Hertfordshire, where he gained a reputation for punctilious service to the king. James I made him a Knight of the Garter in 1624.

Salisbury continued to find favour under James' successor, Charles I, who named Salisbury to his privy council in 1626. Salisbury subsequently conformed during the Personal Rule. He was annoyed when he was not named master of the Court of Wards and Liveries, but was more pleased when he was named Captain of the Honourable Band of Gentlemen Pensioners, a post which he held until 1643.

Salisbury spent much of the 1630s in improving his ancestral seat, Hatfield House. He also made Hatfield House a cultural centre, serving as patron for painter Peter Lely, musician Nicholas Lanier, and gardener John Tradescant the elder.

== Role in the English Civil War, 1640–1649 ==
In the wake of the Bishops' Wars, Salisbury leaned towards the moderate party in the House of Lords which supported the House of Commons in its attempt to remove the elements of arbitrary government introduced into England during the Personal Rule. However, Salisbury resisted throwing in his lot with any of the political factions, and thus remained vulnerable. When the First English Civil War broke out in 1642, Salisbury's estates at Cranborne in Dorset suffered depredations.

In 1648, Salisbury served as a member of a deputation charged with negotiating with Charles at the Isle of Wight. These negotiations (Treaty of Newport) resulted in failure. However, Salisbury refused to approve of the regicide of Charles I.

Following the king's execution, Salisbury decided to support the Commonwealth of England, and agreed to take the Engagement. This decision was influenced by several facts: two of his sons had sided with the parliamentarians during the English Civil War; Parliament voted to indemnify Salisbury's friend Philip Herbert, 4th Earl of Pembroke for his losses during the war; and several of his close friends, especially Algernon Percy, 10th Earl of Northumberland (his son-in-law) had sided with Parliament.

== Career during the English Interregnum, 1649–1656 ==
Salisbury was a member of the English Council of State from 1649 to 1651 (serving as its president for a while). He became Member of Parliament for King's Lynn in the Rump Parliament.

Salisbury was, however, excluded from public life under The Protectorate: he was elected in 1656 as MP for Hertfordshire in the Second Protectorate Parliament, but was not allowed to take his seat.

== Later years, 1656–1668 ==
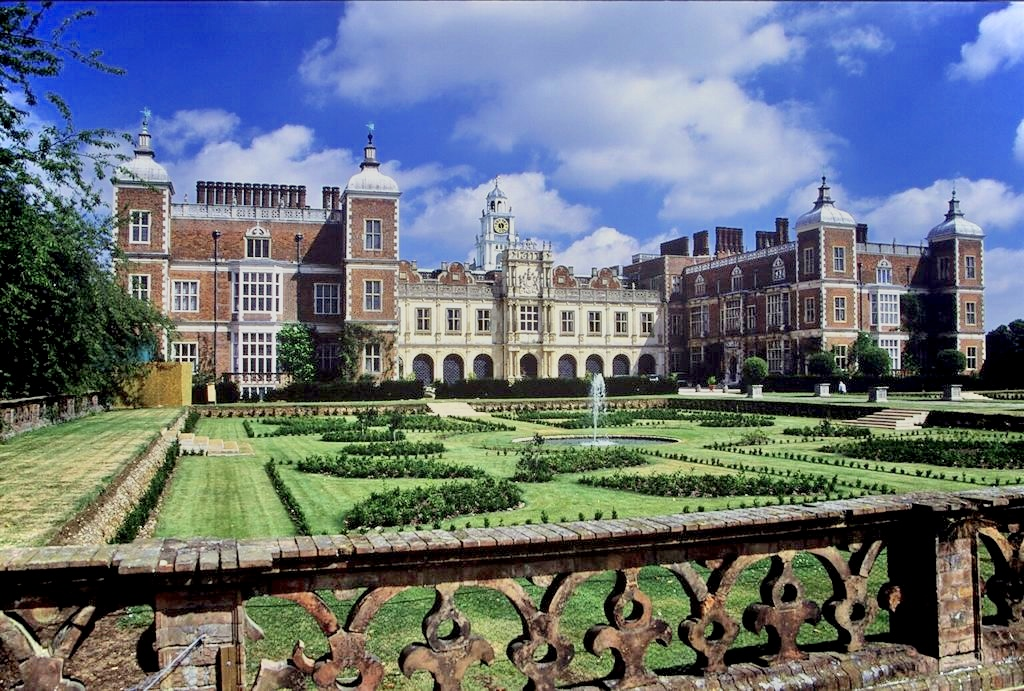
Hatfield House, Hertfordshire

Salisbury subsequently retired to his home at Hatfield House.

Following The Restoration of 1660, Charles II appointed him high steward of St Albans in 1663.

His mental faculties apparently failed in his last years: Samuel Pepys, observing him at church in October 1664, called him "my simple Lord Salisbury". Harsher critics doubted whether he had any faculties to fail in the first place, describing him as a man who never spoke of anything but hunting and hawking.

Salisbury died at Hatfield House on 3 December 1668.

He was succeeded as Earl by his grandson James Cecil, 3rd Earl of Salisbury, as his son Charles (1619–1660) had predeceased him.

== Issue ==
Lord Salisbury married Lady Catherine Howard, a daughter of the 1st Earl of Suffolk, on 1 December 1608. They had twelve children, including:

- James, Viscount Cranborne (born and died 1616)
- Charles Cecil, Viscount Cranborne (1619–1660), father of the 3rd Earl of Salisbury.
- Anne (died 1637), who married the 10th Earl of Northumberland and had issue.
- Diana (1622–1633), died young.
- Catherine (died 1652), who married the 3rd Earl of Leicester and had issue.
- Elizabeth (died 1689), who married the 3rd Earl of Devonshire and had issue.
- Algernon (died 1676)
- Mary, who married Lord William Sandys (died 1668).

== Notes ==
Honorary titles
Preceded by Sir Julius Caesar	Custos Rotulorum of Hertfordshire; 1619–aft. 1636	Succeeded by Sir John Boteler
Preceded by The Earl of Suffolk	Captain of the Gentlemen Pensioners; 1635–1643	Succeeded by The Lord Dunsmore
Preceded by The Lord Cottington	Lord Lieutenant of Dorset; 1641–1646	English Interregnum
Preceded by The Earl of Salisbury	Lord Lieutenant of Hertfordshire jointly with Viscount Cranborne 1640–1646; 1612–1646	
Peerage of England
Preceded by Robert Cecil	Earl of Salisbury; 1612–1668	Succeeded by James Cecil
