= Charles Cecil (died 1726) =

English politician (died 1726)

Charles Cecil (c. 1683 – 14 March 1726) was an English politician. He sat as MP for Stamford from 1705 till 1722.

He was the third son of John Cecil, 5th Earl of Exeter and Lady Anne Cavendish, the daughter of William Cavendish, 3rd Earl of Devonshire and widow of Charles, Lord Rich. He was also the brother of John Cecil, 6th Earl of Exeter and William Cecil. He was educated privately by Matthew Prior and travelled abroad to France and Italy from 1699 till 1700. He was admitted into St. John's College, Cambridge at the age of 13. He entered the Inner Temple in 1701. He died unmarried.
