= William Cartwright (1634–1676) =

English politician

William Cartwright (1634 – 15 April 1676) was an English politician who sat in the House of Commons in 1659.

Cartwright was the son of John Cartwright of Bloxham, Oxfordshire, and was baptised at Aynho on 29 March 1634. He matriculated at Brasenose College, Oxford, on 5 April 1650. In 1659, he was elected Member of Parliament for East Retford.

Cartwright died at the age of 41.

== Family ==
Cartwright married Ursula Fairfax, daughter of Ferdinando Fairfax, 2nd Lord Fairfax of Cameron, and Thomas Cartwright was their son. Their daughter Rhoda married Lord Henry Cavendish.

Parliament of England
Preceded by Not represented in Second Protectorate Parliament	Member of Parliament for East Retford; 1659; With: Clifford Clifton	Succeeded by Edward Neville
