= Elizabeth Cavendish, Countess of Devonshire =

English noblewoman (1619–1689)

The Countess of Devonshire
- Born: 1619
- Died: 19 November 1689 (aged 69–70)
- Spouse: William Cavendish, 3rd Earl of Devonshire
- Issue: 3, William, Charles and Anne
- Father: William Cecil, 2nd Earl of Salisbury
- Mother: Catherine Cecil, Countess of Salisbury

Elizabeth Cavendish, Countess of Devonshire (1619 – 19 November 1689) was the wife of William Cavendish, 3rd Earl of Devonshire.

== Biography ==
She was one of the twelve children of William Cecil, 2nd Earl of Salisbury of Hatfield House, and his wife, the former Lady Catherine Howard of Audley End House, member of the House of Howard.

On 4 March 1639, she married the Earl of Devonshire.

They lived at Chatsworth, then an Elizabethan house. A Royalist, the earl left the country during the English Civil War in order to protect his family, and moved to his mother's house at Latimer, Buckinghamshire, returning to Chatsworth only after the Restoration.

The countess died at the age of about seventy, and is buried at the Henry VII Chapel in Westminster Abbey. A drawing of her by Pierre Lombart is held by the Scottish National Portrait Gallery.

== Family ==
She and her husband had three children:

- William Cavendish, 1st Duke of Devonshire (1641–1707)
- Charles Cavendish, who died unmarried on 3 March 1671.
- Lady Anne Cavendish (c. 1650–1703), who married firstly Charles, Lord Rich, son of Charles Rich, 4th Earl of Warwick, and secondly John Cecil, 5th Earl of Exeter, on 2 May 1670; she had nine children by the latter.
