= Charles Cecil, Viscount Cranborne =

English nobleman and politician

The Right Honourable Viscount Cranborne MP
- Born: 1619
- Died: 1660 (aged 40–41)
- Occupation: Politician
- Spouse: Lady Diana Maxwell
- Children: James Cecil, 3rd Earl of Salisbury
- Parent(s): William Cecil, 2nd Earl of Salisbury; Lady Catherine Howard

Charles Cecil, Viscount Cranborne MP (1619 – December 1660), was an English nobleman and politician who sat in the House of Commons from 1640 to 1648.

Cranborne was the eldest son of William Cecil, 2nd Earl of Salisbury and his wife Lady Catherine Howard, a daughter of the 1st Earl of Suffolk and bore the courtesy title of Viscount Cranborne. He was educated at St John's College, Cambridge.

In April 1640, Cranborne was elected Member of Parliament for Hertford for the Short Parliament and he was re-elected in November 1640 for the Long Parliament. He was Lord Lieutenant of Hertfordshire from 1640 to 1642. Although not specifically excluded under Pride's Purge, he is not recorded as sitting subsequently.

Cranborne predeceased his father at the age of 40 without inheriting the earldom. He had married Lady Diana Maxwell, daughter of James Maxwell, 1st Earl of Dirletoun. Their son James succeeded his grandfather as Earl of Salisbury.

Parliament of England
Vacant Parliament suspended since 1629	Member of Parliament for Hertford; 1640–1648; With: Sir Thomas Fanshawe; William Leman	Succeeded by William Leman
