= Invitation to William =

Letter to William III

Henry Sydney, the author of the letter

The Invitation to William was a letter sent by seven Englishmen (six nobles and a bishop), later referred to as "the Immortal Seven", to stadtholder William III, Prince of Orange, dated 30 June 1688 (Julian calendar, 10 July Gregorian calendar). In England, the heir apparent to the throne, James Francis Edward Stuart, had just been born to the unpopular King James II of England, and baptised a Catholic. The letter asked William, who was a nephew and son-in-law of James II, to use military intervention to force the King to make his eldest daughter, Mary, William's Protestant wife, his heir. The letter alleged that the newborn prince was an impostor.

The letter informed William that if he were to land in England with a small army, the signatories and their allies would rise up and support him. The Invitation briefly rehashed the grievances against King James. It claimed that the King's son was supposititious (fraudulently substituted) and that the English people generally believed him to be so. The present consensus among historians is that he was almost certainly their real son. The letter deplored that William had sent a letter to James congratulating him for the birth of his son, and offered some brief strategy on the logistics of the proposed landing of troops. It was carried to William in The Hague by Rear Admiral Arthur Herbert (the later Lord Torrington) disguised as a common sailor, and identified by a secret code.

The invitation caused William to carry out his existing plans to land with a large Dutch army, culminating in the Glorious Revolution during which James was deposed and replaced by William and Mary as joint rulers. William and Mary had previously asked for such an invitation when William started to assemble an invasion force that April. This request was done through secret correspondence that had been taking place since April 1687, between them and several leading English politicians, regarding how best to counter the pro-Catholic policies of James. William later justified his invasion by the fact that he was invited, which helped to disguise the military, cultural, and political impact that the Dutch regime had on England when his reign was unpopular and he feared a popular uprising.

The signatories were:

- Henry Sydney (who wrote the letter)
- Edward Russell
- Charles Talbot, 12th Earl of Shrewsbury
- William Cavendish, 4th Earl of Devonshire
- Thomas Osborne, 1st Earl of Danby
- Richard Lumley, 2nd Viscount Lumley
- Henry Compton, Bishop of London

Danby and Compton were generally considered to be Tories (the "court party"), the other five to be Whigs (the "country party").

After William's rise to power, Talbot, Cavendish, and Osborne were elevated to dukedoms (as Duke of Shrewsbury, Duke of Devonshire and Duke of Leeds respectively), Lumley elevated to an earldom (as Earl of Scarbrough), and Sydney and Russell were created earls (as Earl of Romney and Earl of Orford respectively). Compton as Bishop of London had his suspension (for refusing to suspend the strongly anti-Catholic John Sharp), running into a third year, lifted; he performed the coronation, granted lands in Maryland to his second cousin, and became a commissioner in revision of the litany.

== Contents ==
The invitation declared:

Wee have great satisfaction to find by 35, and since by Mon. Zulestein, that your Highness is so ready and willing to give us such assistances as they have related to us. Wee have great reason to beleeve that wee shall be every day in a worse condition than we are and lesse able to defend our selves, and therefore wee doe earnestly wish, wee might bee so happy as to find a remedy before it be too late for us to contribute to our owne deliverance; but although these be our wishes yet wee will by no meanes put your Highness into any expectations which may misguide your owne councells in this matter, so that the best advice wee can give is to informe your Highness truely both of the state of things here att this time and of the difficulty's which appear to us. As to the first, the people are so generally dissatisfied with the present conduct of the Gouvernment in relation to their Religion, liberty's, and Property's (all which have been greatly invaded), and they are in such expectation of their prospects being daily worse that your Highness may be assured there are nineteen parts of twenty of the people throughout the Kingdome who are desirous of a change; and who, wee beleeve, would willingly contribute to it, if they had such a protection to countenance their rising, as would secure them from being destroyed.

— Invitation by The Seven.

== Sources ==
- Ashley, Maurice (1966). The Glorious Revolution of 1688. New York: Charles Scribner's Sons. ISBN 0-340-00896-2.
- Dalrymple, John (1790). Memoirs of Great Britain and Ireland; from the Dissolution of the last Parliament of Charles II till the Capture of the French and Spanish Fleets at Vigo. Strahan & Cadell.
- Harris, Tim (2006). Revolution: The Great Crisis of the British Monarchy, 1685–1720. Penguin Books. ISBN 0-7139-9759-1.
- Prall, Stuart (1972). The Bloodless Revolution: England, 1688. Garden City, New York: Anchor Books.
