= Lord Henry Cavendish =

English nobleman and politician

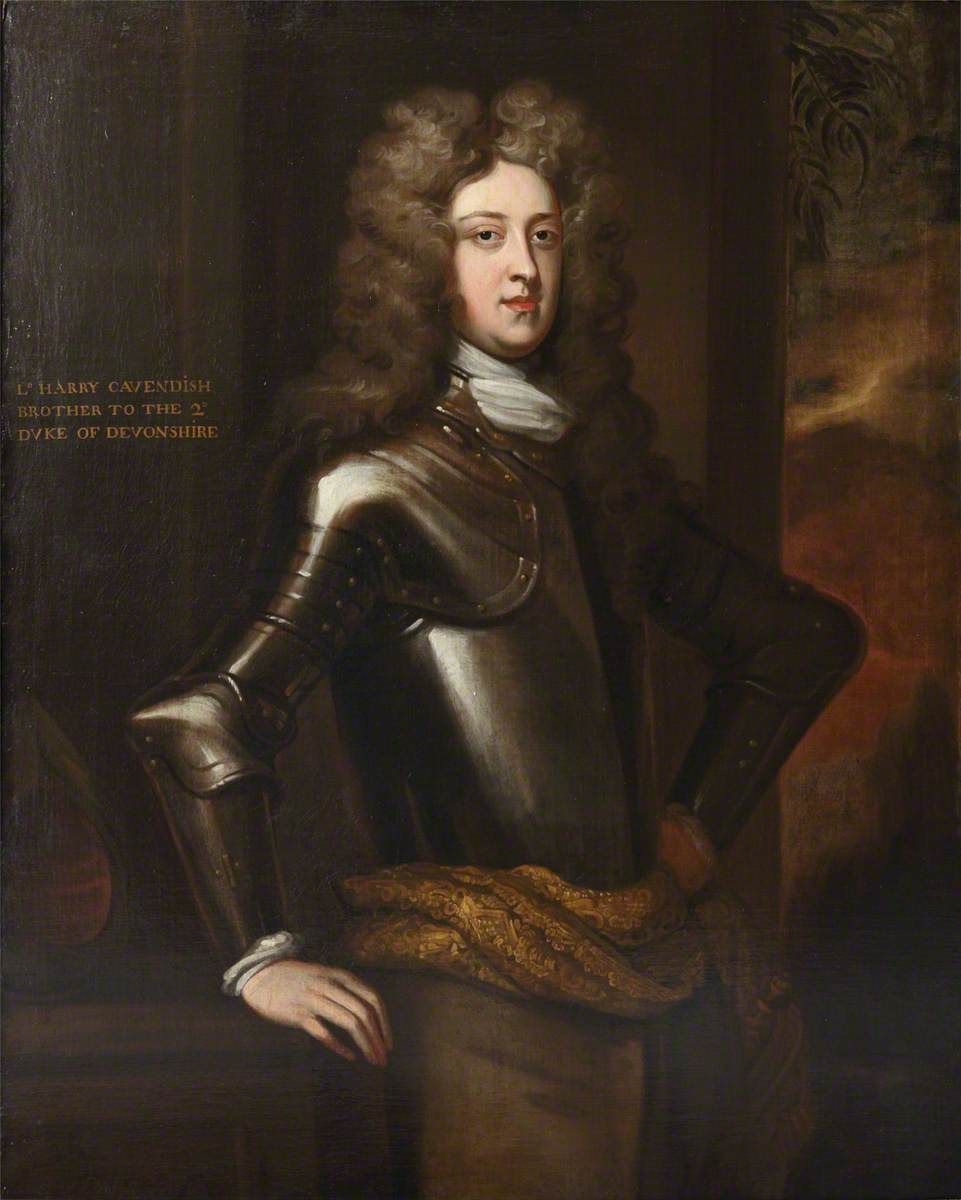

Member of Parliament for Derby
- In office 1695 – 10 May 1700
- Monarch: William III of England

Personal details
- Born: 1673
- Died: 10 May 1700 (aged about 27)
- Spouse: Rhoda Cartwright
- Children: Hon. Mary Cavendish

Lord Henry Cavendish (1673 – 10 May 1700) was an English nobleman and politician, the second surviving son of William Cavendish, 1st Duke of Devonshire.

Cavendish was educated abroad, traveling through Austria, Germany, and the Low Countries, and attending the University of Padua in 1691. He was elected a member of parliament for Derby in 1695

On 3 August 1696, he married Rhoda Cartwright (d. 1730), daughter of William Cartwright, and had one daughter, the Hon. Mary Cavendish (3 January 1700 – 29 July 1778, Hammersmith), who married John Fane, 7th Earl of Westmorland in August 1716.

Cavendish died young on 10 May 1700, as reported by Edward Southwell on 11 May 1700: "My Lord Henry Cavendish, after suffering above a fortnight violently under a dead palsy died yesterday morning."

Cavendish was buried in the family vault at All Saints church Derby (now Derby Cathedral) on 17 May 1700, near his family's estate, Chatsworth. According to one newspaper account of his death, the young Cavendish was "much lamented, he being one of the most accomplished gentlemen in England."

Parliament of England
Preceded by Anchitell Grey; Robert Wilmot	Member of Parliament for Derby; 1695–1700; With: John Bagnold 1695–1698; George Vernon 1698–1700	Succeeded by Sir Charles Pye, Bt; Lord James Cavendish
