= Christian Cavendish, Countess of Devonshire =

Anglo-Scottish landowner and royalist

The Right Honourable The Countess of Devonshire
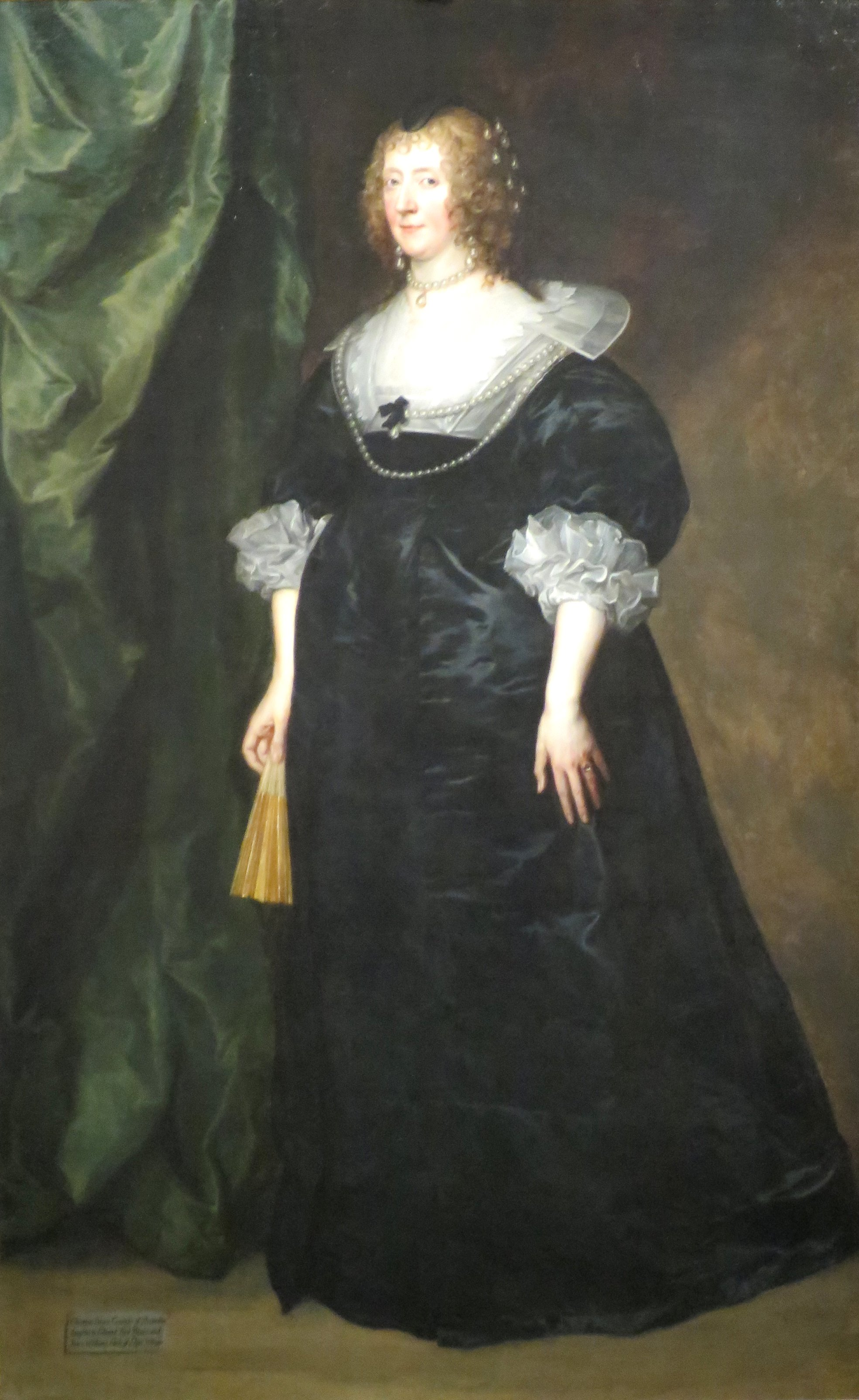
- Christian Bruce, by Anthony van Dyck
- Born: December 1595
- Died: 16 January 1675 (aged 79)
- Spouse: William Cavendish, 2nd Earl of Devonshire (m. 1608; died 1628)
- Children: Anne Rich, Countess of Warwick; William Cavendish, 3rd Earl of Devonshire; Charles Cavendish; Henry Cavendish
- Parents: Edward Bruce, 1st Lord Kinloss; Magdalen Clerk

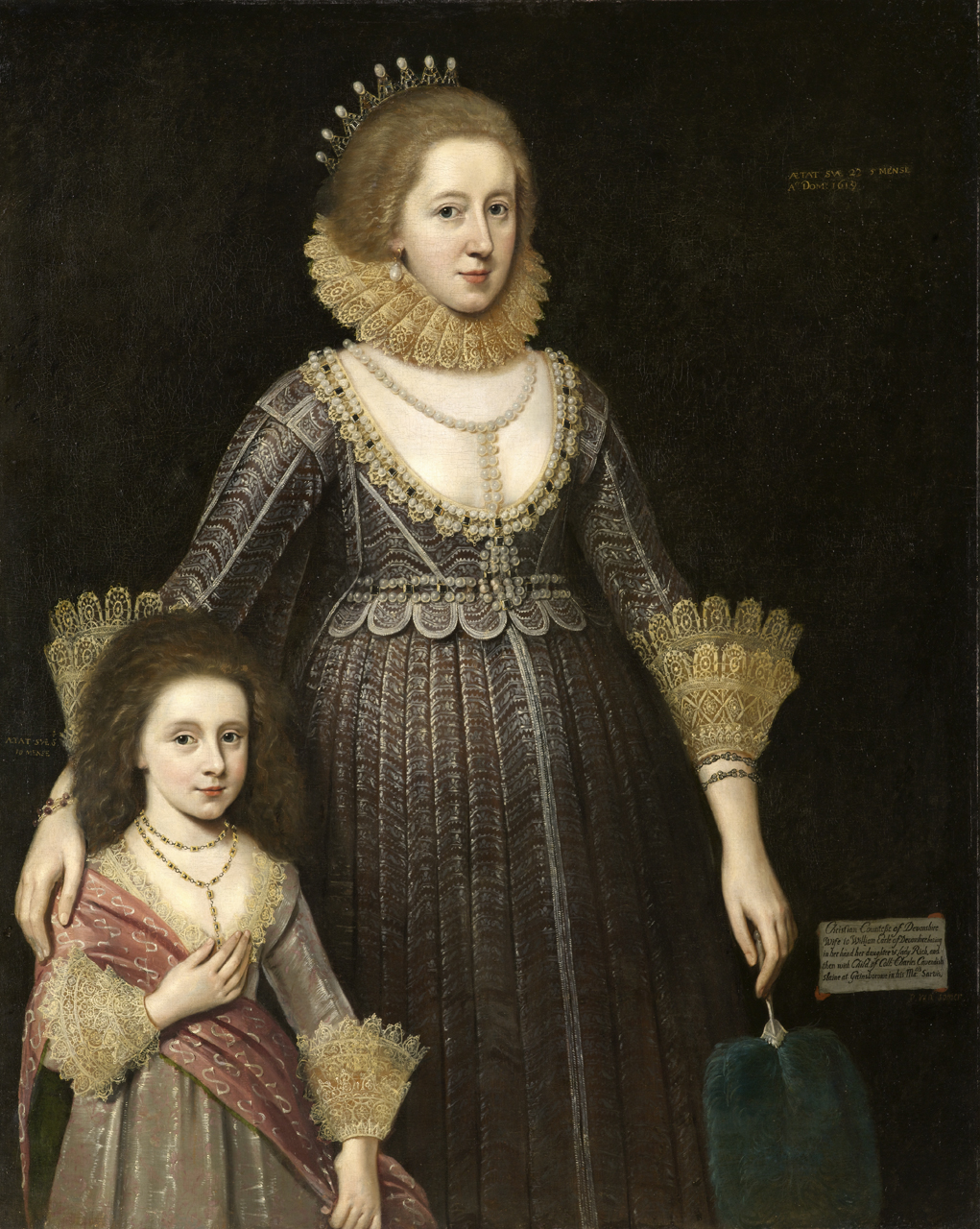
Christian, Lady Cavendish, with her daughter

Christian Cavendish, Countess of Devonshire (née Bruce; 1595–1675) was an influential Scottish landowner and royalist.

== Life ==
Christian Bruce was the daughter of Edward Bruce, 1st Lord Kinloss and Master of the Rolls, and Magdalen Clerk, whose Scottish residence was Culross House in Fife. Her first biographer said she was called "Christian" because she was born on or near Christmas Day. "Christian" was not an unusual name in Scotland. Later writers have called her "Christiana" or "Christina".

According to a memoir of the early life of Princess Elizabeth, the daughter of King James and Anne of Denmark, Christian Bruce was a companion of the Princess at Coombe Abbey from 1604.

She married William Cavendish, 2nd Earl of Devonshire, on 10 April 1608. In token of her father's services to King James I she received a grant of £10,000 upon her marriage. An often-quoted letter from the Earl and Countess of Arundel describes her as a "pretty red-haired wench". Arbella Stuart came to the wedding dinner at Rolls House.

Christian was around twelve or thirteen years old at the time of her marriage. William Cavendish went to France to complete his education in 1610 with his tutor Thomas Hobbes. The legal basis of the marriage was threatened by the family of Margaret Chatterton, a gentlewoman servant to Arbella Stuart who had worked for William's mother, with a claim that William and Margaret had contracted marriage.

Cavendish became Earl of Devonshire in 1618, and Christian signed her letters "C Devonshire". In April 1619, in London, Anne Clifford visited her and her mother, Lady Kinloss in a house at Blackfriars, where the Countess of Somerset had stayed.

She and her husband had four children:

- Anne Cavendish (c. 1611–1638), married Robert Rich, 3rd Earl of Warwick, and had issue.
- William Cavendish, 3rd Earl of Devonshire (1617–1684)
- Charles Cavendish (1620–1643)
- Henry Cavendish (died April 1620)

At Chatsworth she hosted Scottish aristocrats including William Douglas, 7th Earl of Morton, Sir Robert Kerr of Ancram, and Thomas Hamilton, 2nd Earl of Haddington.

After the death of William Cavendish in June 1628, she had the wardship of her 11-year-old son William Cavendish and the care of the estates, the value of which she increased by prudent management. She coped with her husband's debts and thirty lawsuits. In January 1634 she travelled to London with her family, and Thomas Hobbes described her arrival at Stony Stratford and Brickhill. She sent news of the christening of Princess Elizabeth, and a copy of A Letter sent from France by Walter Montague to his father by Walter Montagu to William Cavendish, 1st Duke of Newcastle, hoping he would not be converted by it to Catholicism. She wrote more letters to the Earl of Newcastle, relating her son William's grand tour in France, and the arrival of the Prince Palatine at court. Christmas 1636 was spent at Byfleet.

In 1637 Dorothy Sidney, Countess of Leicester, tried to arrange a marriage between her daughter Dorothy and the Earl of Devonshire; however, she found Christian's letters "full of civility, craft, and coldness", perhaps because Devonshire wanted her son's bride to bring a greater dowry.

At the outbreak of the English Civil War she was one of the most enthusiastic royalists; her second son, Charles was killed at the battle of Gainsborough on 28 July 1643. In 1647 she moved to Ampthill and lived with her brother Thomas Bruce, 1st Earl of Elgin. She kept up correspondence in cipher code with royalists in England and Scotland. In 1650 she bought a house at Roehampton.

She took charge of the king's effects after the Battle of Worcester, and entertained royalists at Roehampton during the Protectorate. She also kept up correspondence with the principal royalists on the Continent, and General Monck sent it to her privately to make her aware of his intention to restore the king. She was also well connected with Oliver Cromwell, whose daughter Frances had married one of her Rich grandchildren, and she was seen at his court. In 1657 she attended the wedding of Frances Cromwell.

After the Restoration Charles II frequently came to Roehampton, and his mother, Henrietta Maria of France, was on terms of intimacy with her.

In old age she was said to be of formidable stature, and at Roehampton she reposed on couch with a suspended canopy and curtains. She died on 16 January 1675, and was buried in Derby on 18 February.

== Letters ==
She entertained wits and men of letters, one of her favourite friends being Edmund Waller, another royalist. Waller dedicated to her his Epistles, which conclude with an Epistle to the Duchess, and he also wrote an epitaph for her son. William Herbert, 3rd Earl of Pembroke wrote a volume of poems in praise of her and Lady Rich, which was published with a dedication to her by John Donne. Her biographer, Thomas Pomfret, also mentions her friendship with Viscount Falkand and Sidney Godolphin.

Several of Lady Devonshire's letters survive. She wrote to the Earl of Haddington (d. 1640), alluding to the Bishops' Wars, "If the calamity be only to terrify not to punish our foul faults, for which I fear we must bleed e'er we can expiate them, I hope there is left a possibility for your Lordship again to see this part of the world." In another letter she advised him against taking sides in the conflict, "You had better be suspected of both sides than a party to either ... If you exclude yourself in reason and religion there's enough to plead for you, even to satisfy the nicest opinions." Some of these letters are dated at "Les", meaning Leicester Abbey a home she used more after her son's marriage in March 1639, until it was destroyed in 1645 following the capture of the town by Prince Rupert.

To William Douglas, Earl of Morton, she wrote news of Charles I and Parliament, and the death of her daughter Anne, Countess of Warwick, in 1638.

Her biographer Thomas Pomfret described her correspondence with royalists in "characters" or cipher code during the years she lived at Ampthill from 1647 to 1650. The work of receiving and opening and making these cipher letters was shared only with her nephew Robert Bruce, 1st Earl of Ailesbury and her chaplain Mr Robert Gale. Her name appears in a surviving copy of cipher key used to encode letters between the Countess of Dysart and the Earl of Inchiquin.

== Notes ==
- Victor Slater, 'Cavendish, née Bruce, Christian, Christiana, countess of Devonshire', ODNB, 23 Sept. 2004.
- Thomas Pomfret, The Life of the Right Honourable and Religious Lady Christian, Late Countess Dowager of Devonshire (London, 1685).

Attribution

This article incorporates text from a publication now in the public domain: "Cavendish, Christiana". Dictionary of National Biography. London: Smith, Elder & Co. 1885–1900.
