= William Cavendish, 1st Duke of Devonshire =

English politician (1640–1707)

His Grace The Duke of Devonshire KG PC FRS
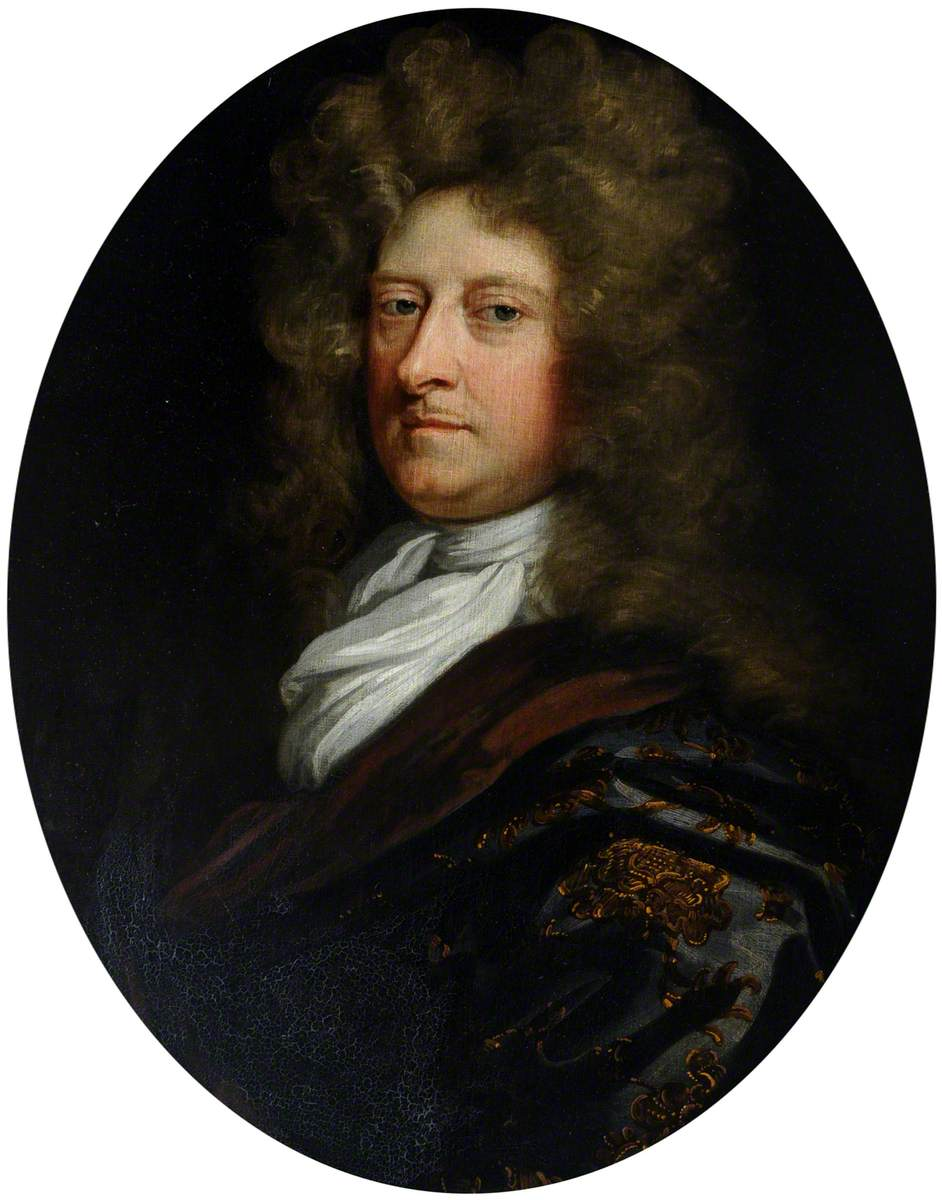
- Portrait by Godfrey Kneller

Lord Steward of the Household
- In office 1689–1707
- Preceded by: The Duke of Ormond
- Succeeded by: William Cavendish, 2nd Duke of Devonshire

Lord High Steward for the Coronation of Queen Anne
- In office 22 April 1702 – 23 April 1702
- Preceded by: The Baron Somers
- Succeeded by: The Duke of Grafton

Personal details
- Born: 25 January 1640
- Died: 18 August 1707 (aged 67)
- Spouse: Lady Mary Butler (m. 1662)
- Children: Lady Elizabeth Cavendish; William Cavendish, 2nd Duke of Devonshire; Lord Henry Cavendish; Lord James Cavendish
- Parent(s): William Cavendish, 3rd Earl of Devonshire; Elizabeth Cavendish, Countess of Devonshire

William Cavendish, 1st Duke of Devonshire (25 January 1640 – 18 August 1707) was an English Whig politician who sat in the House of Commons of England from 1661 until 1684 when he inherited his father's peerage as Earl of Devonshire and took his seat in the House of Lords. Cavendish was part of the "Immortal Seven" which invited William of Orange to depose James II of England as part of the Glorious Revolution, and was rewarded for his efforts by being elevated to the Duke of Devonshire in 1694.

== Life ==
Cavendish was the son of William Cavendish, 3rd Earl of Devonshire, and his wife Lady Elizabeth Cecil. After completing his education he made the customary tour of Europe, and then in 1661, he was elected Member of Parliament for Derbyshire in the Cavalier Parliament. He was a Whig under Charles II of England and James II of England and was leader of the anti-court and anti-Catholic party in the House of Commons, where he served as Lord Cavendish. In 1678 he was one of the committee appointed to draw up articles of impeachment against the Lord Treasurer Lord Danby.

He was re-elected MP for Derbyshire in the two elections of 1679 and in 1681. He was made a privy councillor by Charles II, but he soon withdrew with his friend Lord Russell, when he found that the Roman Catholic interest uniformly prevailed.

In January 1681 he carried up to the House of Lords the articles of impeachment against Lord Chief Justice William Scroggs, for his arbitrary and illegal proceedings in the court of King's bench, and later when the king declared his resolution not to sign the bill for excluding the duke of York (afterwards James II), he moved in the House of Commons that a bill might be brought in for the association of all his majesty's Protestant subjects. He also openly denounced the king's counsellors, and voted for an address to remove them.

He appeared in defence of Lord Russell at his trial for treason, and after the condemnation he gave the utmost possible proof of his attachment by offering to exchange clothes with Lord Russell in the prison, remain in his place, and so allow him to effect his escape.

The famed political philosopher Thomas Hobbes spent the last four or five years of his living at Chatsworth House, owned by the Cavendish family, and died at another Cavendish estate, Hardwick Hall in December 1679. He had been a friend of the family since 1608 when he first tutored an earlier William Cavendish.

In 1684 he succeeded to the peerage as Earl of Devonshire on the death of his father and then sat in the House of Lords. He opposed the arbitrary acts of James II until his enemies found an excuse to neutralize him; after an imagined insult by a Colonel Colepepper, Cavendish struck his opponent and was immediately fined the enormous sum of £30,000. He was unable to pay and was briefly imprisoned until he signed a bond (which was eventually cancelled by King William). The earl went for a time to Chatsworth House, where he occupied himself with the erection of a new mansion, designed by William Talman, with decorations by Antonio Verrio, James Thornhill, and Grinling Gibbons.

Cavendish was a strong supporter of the "Glorious Revolution" of 1688 which brought William III of Orange to the throne, signing as one of the Immortal Seven the invitation to William. On the occasion of the coronation he was awarded the Order of the Garter.

After the revolution, Cavendish was a leading Whig, serving as William's Lord Steward, and was created the Duke of Devonshire (1694) and also Marquess of Hartington in recognition for his services. His last public service was assisting to conclude the union with Scotland, for negotiating which he and his eldest son, the marquis of Hartington, had been appointed among the commissioners by Queen Anne.

Cavendish was given an honorary M.A. by the University of Cambridge in 1705. The year before he had ended the successful career of the singer and dancer Mary Campion. She is thought to have given her last performance on 14 March 1704 (and she may have been the daughter of one of his servants). Cavendish installed her as his mistress at Bolton Street in Westminster despite having several mistresses already, a number of children by them and of course Lady Mary Butler, his wife. They had a child named Mary Anne Cavendish before Mary Campion died of a fever on 19 May 1706. Cavendish surprised many by having her buried in the family church in an extravagant tomb. He did not attend her funeral and he died, some say in repentance, the following year.

== Family ==
Cavendish married Lady Mary Butler (1646–1710), daughter of James Butler, 1st Duke of Ormonde and his wife, Lady Elizabeth Preston, on 26 October 1662. They had four children:

- Lady Elizabeth Cavendish (1670–1741), married Sir John Wentworth, 1st Baronet of North Elmsall, and had issue
- William Cavendish, 2nd Duke of Devonshire (c. 1672 – 4 June 1729)
- Lord Henry Cavendish (1673 – 10 May 1700)
- Lord James Cavendish (died 14 December 1751)

== Gallery ==
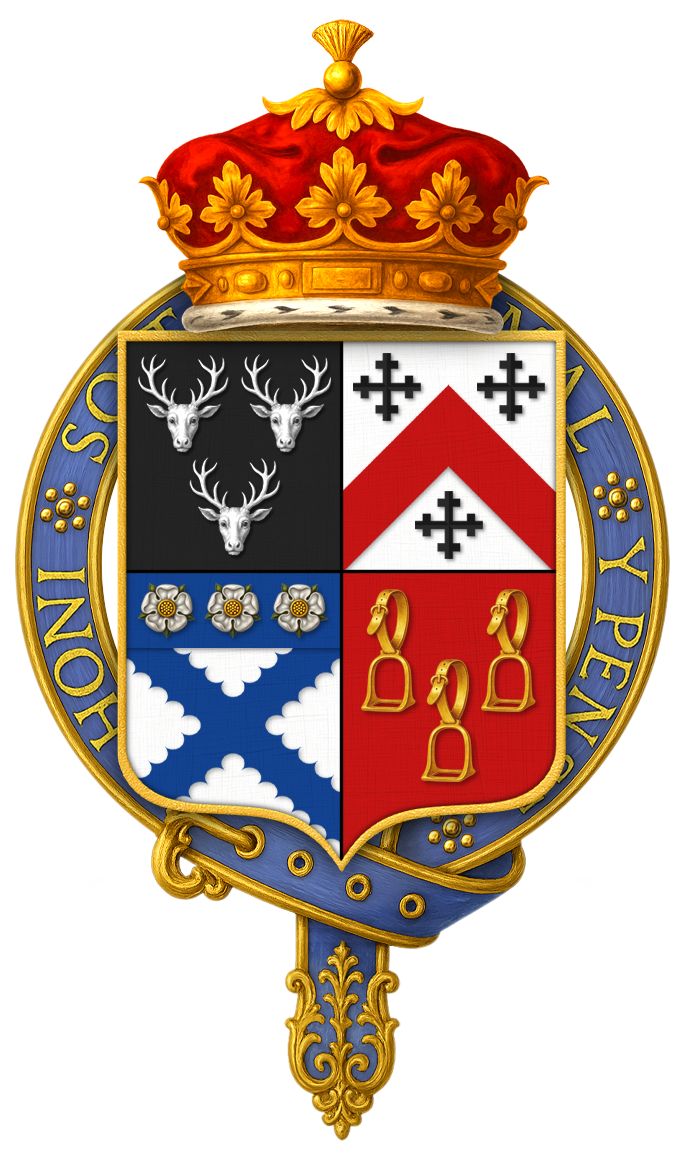
Quartered arms of William Cavendish, 1st Duke of Devonshire, KG, PC, FRS

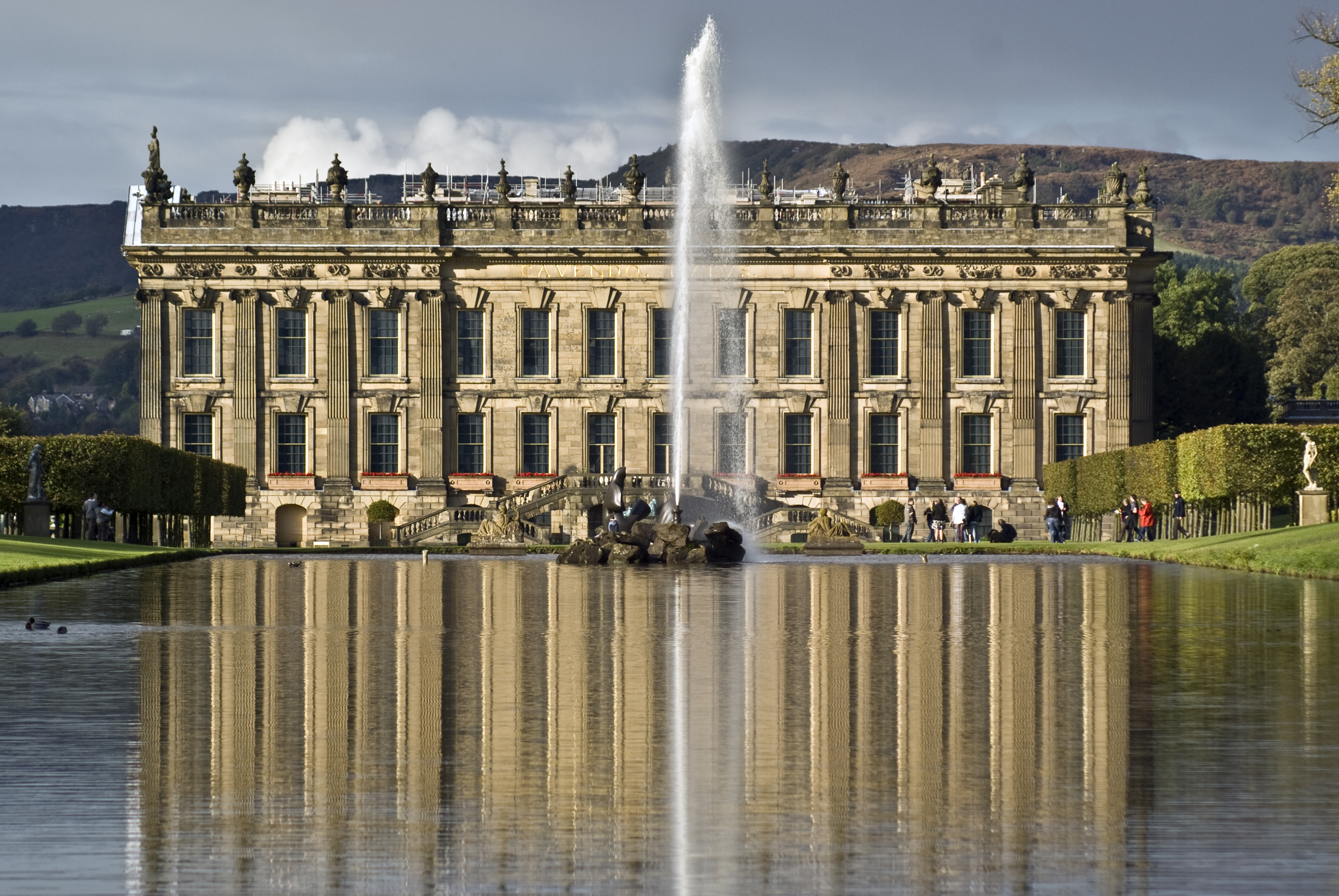
Chatsworth House, seat of the Dukes of Devonshire

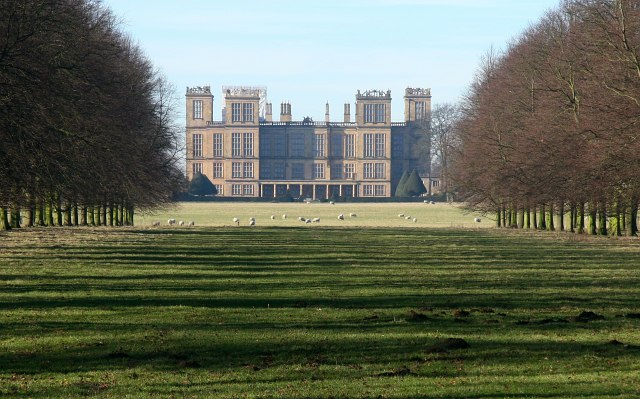
Hardwick Hall, an Elizabethan country house of the Duke in Derbyshire

Parliament of England
Preceded by Viscount Mansfield; John Ferrers	Member of Parliament for Derbyshire; 1661–1684; With: John Frescheville 1661–1665; John Milward 1665–1670; William Sacheverell 1670–1684	Succeeded by Sir Robert Coke, 2nd Baronet; Sir Gilbert Clarke
Political offices
Preceded by The Duke of Ormonde	Lord Steward; 1689–1707	Succeeded by The Duke of Devonshire
Honorary titles
Preceded by The Earl of Huntingdon	Lord Lieutenant of Derbyshire; 1689–1707	Succeeded by The Duke of Devonshire
Preceded by The Duke of Newcastle	Custos Rotulorum of Derbyshire; 1689–1707	Succeeded by The Duke of Devonshire
Preceded by The Viscount Fitzhardinge	Lord Lieutenant of Somerset; 1690–1691; Served alongside: The Marquess of Carmarthen; The Earl of Dorset	Succeeded by The Duke of Ormonde
Vacant Title last held by The Earl of Kingston-upon-Hull	Lord Lieutenant of Nottinghamshire; 1692–1694	Succeeded by The Duke of Newcastle
Legal offices
Preceded by The Earl of Kingston	Justice in Eyre north of the Trent; 1690–1707	Succeeded by The Duke of Devonshire
Peerage of England
New creation	Duke of Devonshire; 1694–1707	Succeeded by William Cavendish
Preceded by William Cavendish	Earl of Devonshire; 1684–1707	Succeeded by William Cavendish
