= John Cecil, 5th Earl of Exeter =

British peer and Member of Parliament

The Earl of Exeter

Member of Parliament for Northamptonshire
- In office 1675–1678

Personal details
- Born: 1648
- Died: 29 August 1700 (aged 51–52)
- Spouse: Anne Cecil, Countess of Exeter
- Children: 9, including John, Charles, William
- Parents: John Cecil, 4th Earl of Exeter (father); Frances Cecil, Countess of Exeter (mother)

John Cecil, 5th Earl of Exeter (c. 1648 – 29 August 1700), known as Lord Burghley until 1678, was an English peer and Member of Parliament. He was also known as the Travelling Earl.

== Life ==
Exeter was the son of John Cecil, Earl of Exeter (1628–1678), and Frances Manners. He was educated at Stamford School and St John's College, Cambridge. He was elected to the House of Commons for Northamptonshire in 1675, a seat he held until 1678 when he succeeded his father in the earldom and entered the House of Lords.

Exeter was a notable Grand Tourist and filled his family home, Burghley House, with treasures purchased on his travels in 1679–81, 1683–4 and 1699–1700 in Italy. He purchased 300 works of art during his 22 years in Burghley and spent on his last visit to Europe £5,000 (c. £535,000 in 2017 currency).

Exeter married Anne, daughter of William Cavendish, Earl of Devonshire, around 1670, and they had nine children. He died in August 1700 and was succeeded in his titles by his son John.

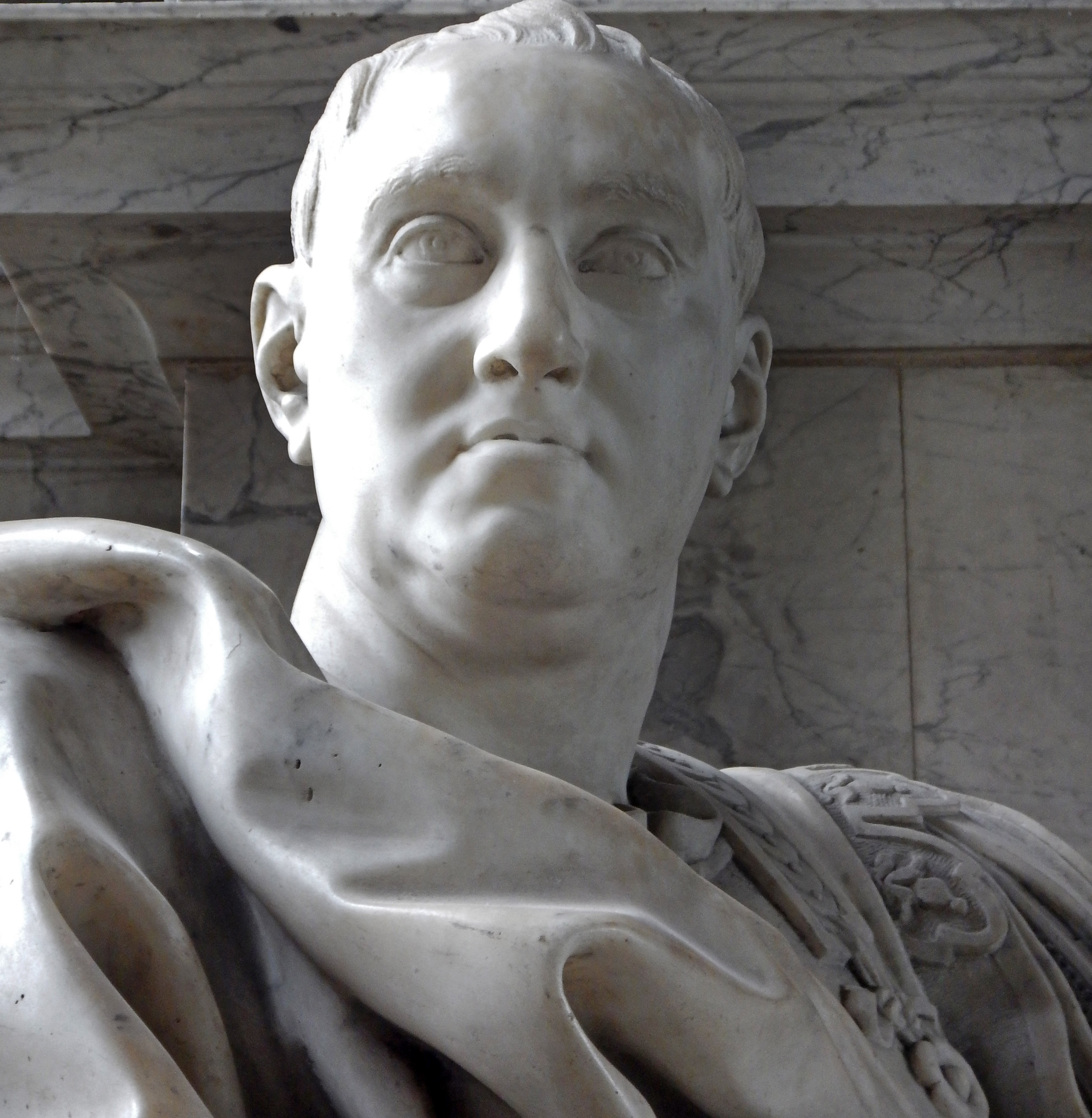
His funerary monument by Pierre-Étienne Monnot in St Martin's Church, Stamford

== Marriage and Issue ==
Eight of his nine children were:

- John Cecil, 6th Earl of Exeter (15 May 1674 – 24 December 1721), known as Lord Burghley from 1678 to 1700. Member of Parliament for Rutland 1695 – 29 August 1700.
- Hon. William Cecil (before 1682 – 6 May 1715), 2nd son He was a member of the Order of Little Bedlam a.k.a. Bedlam Club, a gentlemen's drinking club, founded in 1684 by John Cecil, 5th Earl of Exeter of Burghley House, and lapsing on his death in 1700. In 1705 it was reconvened by his son, John Cecil, 6th Earl of Exeter as grand master 'Lion', his brother William as 'Panther' and brother Charles as 'Bull'. Member of Parliament for Stamford 1698 – 1705.
- Hon. Charles Cecil (c.1683 – 17 March 1726), 3rd son. A member of the Bedlam Club with his brothers. Member of Parliament for Stamford 1705 – 1722.
- Hon. Edward Cecil, 4th son (d. 1723)
- Lady Christian Cecil
- Lady Ann Cecil
- Lady Frances Cecil, died young
- Lady Elizabeth Cecil (1687 – 12 June 1708), fourth daughter. Married Charles Boyle, 4th Earl of Orrery. "By Elizabeth, the beautiful and accomplished daughter of John Cecil, Earl of Exeter, his lordship had only one son, John, fifth Earl of Orrery, his successor. This regretted lady died in the 21st year of her age."

Parliament of England
Preceded by Sir Justinian Isham, Bt; George Clerke	Member of Parliament for Northamptonshire; 1675–1678; With: George Clerke	Succeeded by George Clerke; Miles Fleetwood
Peerage of England
Preceded by John Cecil	Earl of Exeter; 1678–1700	Succeeded by John Cecil
