= John Cecil, 6th Earl of Exeter =

British peer and Member of Parliament

The Earl of Exeter
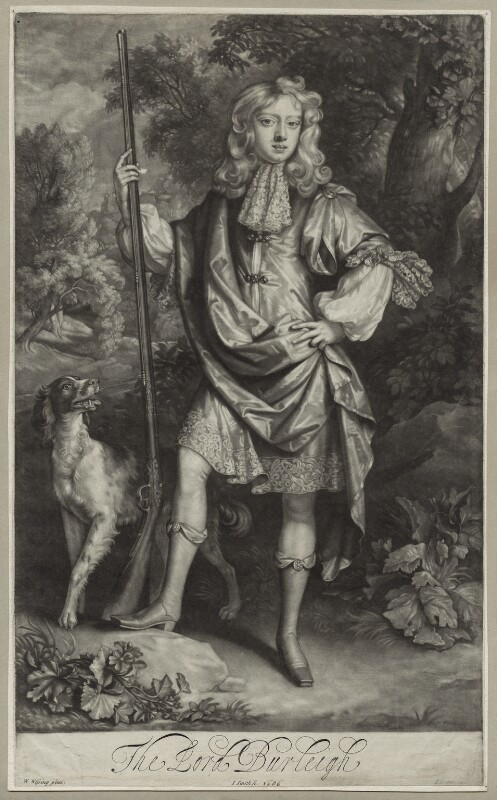

Personal details
- Born: 15 May 1674
- Died: 24 December 1721 (aged 47)
- Spouse: Elizabeth Brownlow
- Children: 6, including John and Brownlow
- Parents: John Cecil, 5th Earl of Exeter (father); Anne Cecil, Countess of Exeter (mother)

John Cecil, 6th Earl of Exeter (15 May 1674 – 24 December 1721), known as Lord Burleigh from 1678 to 1700, was a British peer and Member of Parliament.

== Biography ==
Exeter was the son of John Cecil, Earl of Exeter, and Anne Cavendish. He sat as Member of Parliament for Rutland from 1695 to 1700, when he succeeded his father in the earldom and entered the House of Lords. Between 1712 and 1715 he also served as Lord Lieutenant of Rutland.

Exeter married first Annabella Grey, daughter of Ford Grey, Earl of Tankerville, in 1697. After she died in 1698, his second wife was Elizabeth Brownlow, daughter of John Brownlow, in 1699. He died on Christmas Eve in December 1721 and was succeeded in his titles by his eldest son from his second marriage, John Cecil, 7th Earl of Exeter. His widow died in 1723.

Exeter's second son from his second marriage, Brownlow Cecil, 8th Earl of Exeter, would eventually succeed his brother to the title.

Exeter also had a third son, named William, who was educated with his brother Brownlow "at St. John's College, Cambridge, and gave great hopes that he would maintain the lustre of the family; 'but died too early, to the concern of all who had the happiness of his acquaintance, July 19, 1717.'"

Exeter also had a fourth and a fifth son, Francis and Charles. 'The Hon. Charles Cecil, fifth son of John, sixth earl of Exeter, died young and unmarried, in 1726'.

Exeter also had a daughter, Elizabeth. She was the only daughter of the earl, and wife of William Aislabie of Studley, in Yorkshire, son and heir of John Aislabie, Chancellor of the Exchequer. She died in 1733, aged 26 years, and was buried at Ripon.

== Bibliography ==
- Kidd, Charles, Williamson, David (editors). Debrett's Peerage and Baronetage (1990 edition). New York: St Martin's Press, 1990.

Parliament of Great Britain
Preceded by Bennet Sherard; Sir Thomas Mackworth	Member of Parliament for Rutland; 1695–1700; With: Bennet Sherard 1695–1698; Richard Halford 1698–1700	Succeeded by Richard Halford; Sir Thomas Mackworth
Honorary titles
Preceded by The Lord Sherard	Lord Lieutenant of Rutland; 1712–1715	Succeeded by The Earl of Harborough
Peerage of England
Preceded by John Cecil	Earl of Exeter; 1700–1721	Succeeded by John Cecil
