= William Cavendish, 3rd Earl of Devonshire =

English nobleman and politician

The Right Honourable The Earl of Devonshire KB FRS
- Born: 10 October 1617
- Died: 23 November 1684 (aged 67)
- Spouse: Elizabeth Cavendish, Countess of Devonshire
- Children: William Cavendish, 1st Duke of Devonshire; Charles Cavendish; Lady Anne Cavendish
- Parent(s): William Cavendish, 2nd Earl of Devonshire; Christian Cavendish, Countess of Devonshire

William Cavendish, 3rd Earl of Devonshire, KB, FRS (c. 10 October 1617 – 23 November 1684) was an English nobleman and politician, known as a royalist supporter.

== Life ==
The eldest son of William Cavendish, 2nd Earl of Devonshire and his wife Christian Cavendish, Countess of Devonshire, he was educated by his mother with his father's old tutor Thomas Hobbes. Hobbes's translation of Thucydides is dedicated to Cavendish, and from 1634 to 1637 he travelled abroad with the philosopher.

Cavendish was created a Knight of the Bath at Charles I's coronation in 1625. He was Lord Lieutenant of Derbyshire from 13 November 1638 to 22 March 1642, was high steward of Ampthill 4 February 1640, and joint-commissioner of array for Leicestershire 12 January 1642. As a prominent royalist he opposed Strafford's attainder, was summoned to a private conference with the queen in October 1641, was with Charles I at York in June 1642, absented himself from his place in the parliament, was impeached with eight other peers of high crimes and misdemeanors, refused to appear at the bar of the House of Lords, was expelled on 20 July 1642, and was ordered to stand committed to the Tower of London. He left England, and his estates were sequestrated.

Cavendish returned from the continent in 1645, submitted to the parliament, was pardoned for his former delinquency in 1646, was fined £5,000, and lived in retirement with his mother at Latimer, Buckinghamshire. Charles I stayed a night with him there on 13 October 1645. At the Restoration all his disabilities were removed, he was reappointed lord-lieutenant of Derbyshire (20 August 1660), became steward of Tutbury (8 August), and of the Forest of High Peak (1661).

Cavendish, a virtuoso, was close to John Evelyn, and was one of the original fellows of the Royal Society (20 May 1663), He was a commissioner of trade from 5 March 1668 to 1669, but lived mainly in the country. He died on 23 November 1684, at his house at Roehampton, Surrey, and was buried at Edensor]. His wife Elizabeth died five years later, and was buried in Westminster Abbey.

== Family ==
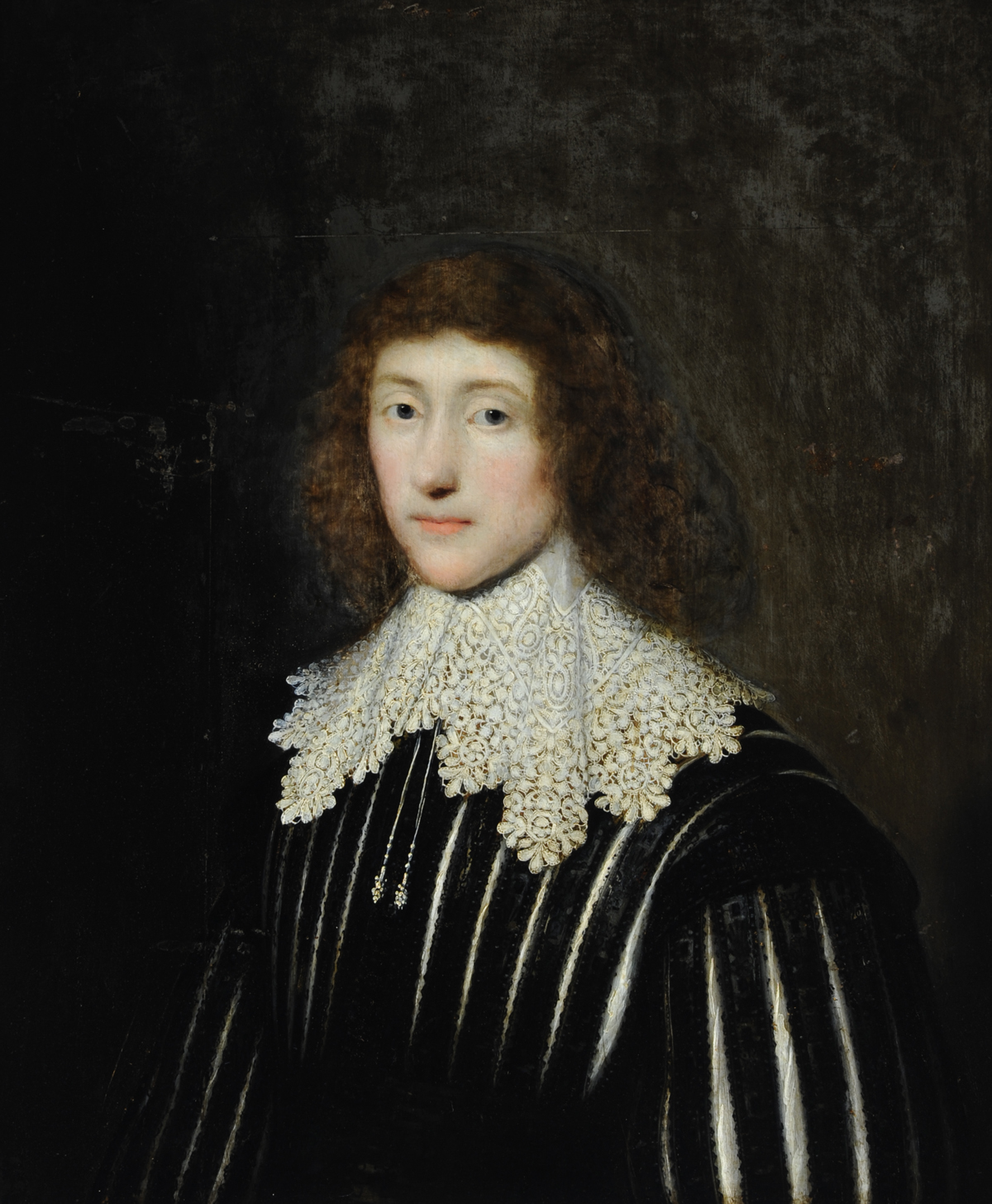
1631 portrait painting of William Cavendish by Cornelis Janssens van Ceulen

The Countess of Leicester was anxious for him to marry Lady Dorothy Sidney, her daughter and Edmund Waller's "Sacharissa"; but the match came to nothing. Elizabeth, second daughter of William Cecil, 2nd Earl of Salisbury, became Cavendish's wife, on 4 March 1639. Their children were:

- William Cavendish, 1st Duke of Devonshire (1640–1707)
- Charles Cavendish, died unmarried on 3 March 1671.
- Lady Anne Cavendish (c.1650–1703), married Charles, Lord Rich, son of the Earl of Warwick; and then John Cecil, 5th Earl of Exeter on 2 May 1670 and had issue.

== Notes ==
Political offices
Preceded by The Earl of Newcastle	Lord Lieutenant of Derbyshire; 1638–1642	English Interregnum
Honorary titles
English Interregnum	Lord Lieutenant of Derbyshire; 1660–1684	Succeeded by The Earl of Scarsdale
Peerage of England
Preceded by William Cavendish	Earl of Devonshire; 1628–1684	Succeeded by William Cavendish
