= London Defence Conference =

Annual conference on international security and defence

- Abbreviation: LDC
- Formation: 2022
- Founder: Iain Martin
- Headquarters: Bush House
- Location: London, United Kingdom
- Director: Iain Martin
- Chairman: Lord Salisbury
- Affiliations: King's College London; School of Security Studies
- Website: londondefenceconference.com

The London Defence Conference (LDC) is an annual defence and security event convening in London since its establishment in 2022. It is hosted by the King's College London School of Security Studies at Bush House.

== History ==
=== 2022 ===
The 2022 conference took place on 9 May at Bush House in London and was organised in response to the Russian invasion of Ukraine. The School of Security Studies at King's College London and Reaction.life, a news website edited by Iain Martin, jointly hosted the conference.

The conference was called the 'Defence of Europe conference' as the LDC had not yet begun organising as an annual event. The members of the organising committee were Lord Salisbury, Professor Wyn Bowen, Professor John Gearson, and Iain Martin. The Ukraine Ambassador to the UK Vadym Prystaiko was the Guest of Honour.

=== 2023 ===
In 2023, the conference took place on 23–24 May. This was technically the inaugural LDC as the previous year's had originally been conceived of as a one-off event in response to the invasion of Ukraine.

The theme of the event was "Stronger security in a fast-changing world". The UK Prime Minister Rishi Sunak and the president of Poland Andrzej Duda spoke at the event.

=== 2024 ===
The 2024 conference took place between 21 and 23 May. The theme of the conference was "Deterrence: Building Capacity to Counter Global Threats." The first day was a "Future Leaders' Day" in which students and young professionals from the UK arrived to discuss geopolitical matters.

Keynote speeches were given by the prime minister of Kosovo Albin Kurti, the UK's Secretary of State for Defence Grant Shapps, the deputy prime minister of the UK Oliver Dowden, and the Polish minister of foreign affairs Radosław Sikorski.

=== 2025 ===
The conference for 2025 took place on 8–10 May and the theme was "Alliances". The first day of the conference coincided with the 80th anniversary of Victory in Europe Day and the prime minister of the United Kingdom Keir Starmer delivered a speech at the event commemorating the day. During the speech, Starmer announced a £563 million contract with Rolls-Royce for the maintenance of 130 Typhoon fighter jets. Also, representatives from Ukraine's Ministry of Defence showcased their latest military technology.

On the second day, Secretary of State for Defence John Healey, Chair of the NATO Innovation Fund Klaus Hommels, and Ambassador of Ukraine to the UK Valerii Zaluzhnyi all spoke at the event. The third and final day of the conference was a Future Leaders' Day in which representatives from 17 UK and European universities and roughly 50 organisations and government departments convened.
