= College Lane =

University campus in England

Coordinates: 51.753°N 0.243°W

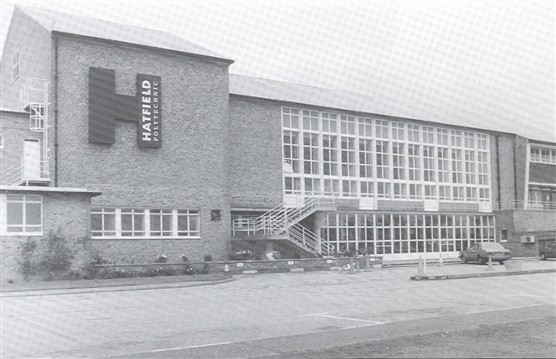
College Lane campus ca 1969

College Lane is the main site of the University of Hertfordshire. It traces its origin to when the de Havilland company was successful enough to donate a site to Hertfordshire County Council for educational use: the site was then developed as Hatfield Technical College (which was renamed as the University of Hertfordshire in 1992), which is now the College Lane campus.

== Facilities ==
It houses a learning resource centre, which is considered to be among the largest in Britain. It is also the location of The Forum, a £38-million Student Union venue built in 2009, with a capacity of up to 2250 over three rooms. Notable among the buildings in this campus is the university's Learning Resource Centre, a combined library and computer centre. There is also a substantial collection of halls of residence and student houses, and the University of Hertfordshire Students' Union is headquartered at College Lane campus. The College Lane campus is also the location of Hertfordshire International College, which is part of the Navitas group, providing a direct pathway for international students to the university. The Hertfordshire Intensive Care & Emergency Simulation Centre is also located at College Lane.

== Future developments ==
Major developments are being done at College Lane including the establishment of a new Science Building, Engineering Building, Senate Building, Teaching Building, Conference Centre and Boulevard.
