= University of Hertfordshire =

Public university in England

Coordinates: 51°45′12″N 0°14′38″W

- Coat of arms
- Motto: Seek knowledge throughout life
- Type: Public
- Established: 1952 – as Hatfield Technical College; 1958 – as Hatfield College of Technology; 1969 – as Hatfield Polytechnic; 1992 – university status
- Affiliations: European University Association; University Alliance; Universities UK
- Endowment: £0.824 million (2022)
- Budget: £317.5 million (2021–22)
- Chancellor: Grace Ononiwu
- Vice-Chancellor: Anthony Woodman
- Undergraduates: 33,575 (2024/25)
- Postgraduates: 20,305 (2024/25)
- Location: Hertfordshire, UK
- Campus: 200 hectares, Urban
- Colours: Black, White and Purple
- Website: herts.ac.uk

The University of Hertfordshire (UH) is a public research university in Hertfordshire, United Kingdom. It is based primarily in Hatfield, Hertfordshire. Its antecedent institution, Hatfield Technical College, was founded in 1948 and was identified as one of 25 Colleges of Technology in the United Kingdom in 1959. In 1992, Hatfield Polytechnic was granted university status by the British government and subsequently renamed the University of Hertfordshire. It is one of the post-1992 universities.

Hertfordshire is mainly based at two campuses: College Lane and de Havilland. The university has six schools: Hertfordshire Business School, Creative Arts, Education, Health, Medicine and Life Sciences, Hertfordshire Law School, and Physics, Engineering and Computer Science.

As of 2024, it has around 34,000 students, including more than 19,000 international students that together represent 110 countries, making the university host the highest proportion of international students (outside of London) in England. The university is one of Hertfordshire's largest employers with over 3,400 staff, 2,045 of whom are academic members of staff. The annual income of the institution for 2021–22 was £317.5 million of which £9 million was from research grants and contracts, with an expenditure of £305.3 million. Hertfordshire is a member of University Alliance, Universities UK and European University Association.

== History ==
=== Origins ===
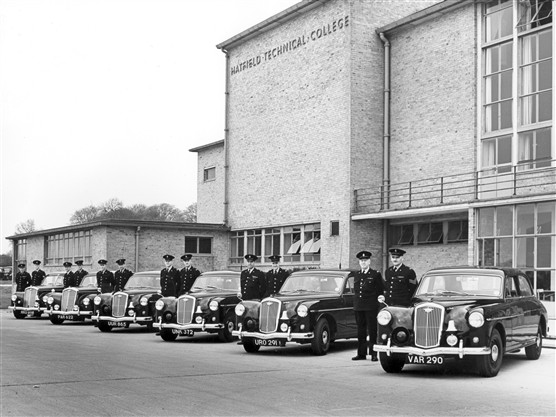
Hatfield Technical College c. 1952

The original campus for the university was at Roe Green in Hatfield, where it was founded as a technical college with a particular focus on training aerospace engineers for the aerospace industry that was then a feature of Hatfield. The Gape family of St Michael's Manor in St Albans owned the land at Roe Green from the late 17th century. In the 1920s they sold it to Hill, a farmer, who then sold it to Alan Butler, chairman of the de Havilland Aircraft Company, who lived at Beech Farm nearby. In 1944 he donated 90 acres (36 hectares) of land at Roe Green to be used for educational purposes. In 1948 building commenced. The first principal, W. A. J. Chapman, began work on 1 January 1949, and in spring 1952 the 33 full-time and 66 part-time teachers were appointed. Hatfield Technical College opened with 1,738 students in September 1952, and in December it was formally opened by Prince Philip, Duke of Edinburgh. It was the first large technical college to be established in England after the war. Students attended the college on part-time or full-time courses.

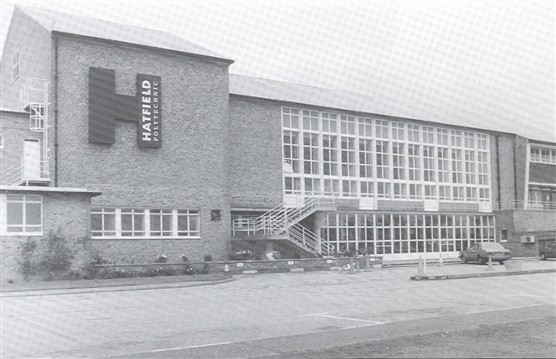
Hatfield Polytechnic c. 1969

In 1958 it was renamed Hatfield College of Technology, and by 1960 it offered four-year sandwich diplomas in technology. In 1961 it was designated a regional college in England and Wales by the Ministry of Education. The governors purchased a digital computer at a cost of £29,201 in 1962 so that a computer science degree could be established. The Council for National Academic Awards was formed in 1965 and Hatfield College was recognised for 13 honours degree courses.

Sir Norman Lindop became the Principal of the College of Technology in 1966. A year later, L.E. Haines was made Chair of Governors, but he died shortly afterwards and was replaced by F. Bramston Austin. A year later, Bayfordbury was acquired for the college.

=== 20th century ===
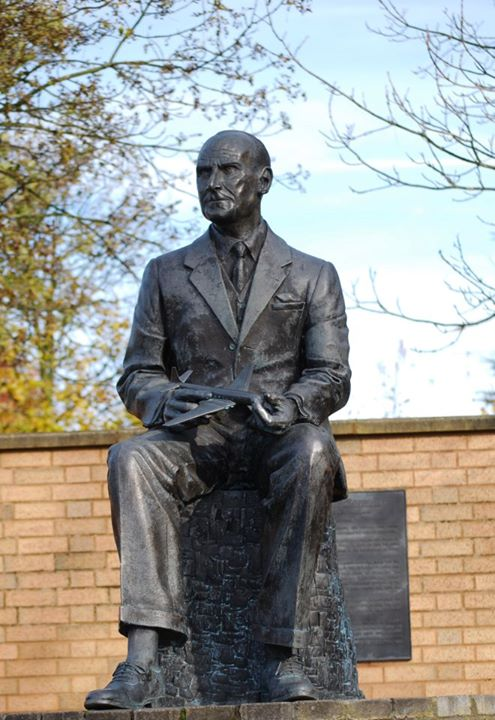
Sir Geoffrey De Havilland with a model of his 'Comet' jet airliner

In 1969 Hatfield College of Technology became Hatfield Polytechnic, offering honours degree courses in engineering and technology. In 1970 an observatory was built on the Bayfordbury Campus. Wall Hall and Balls Park Teacher Training Colleges merged in 1976 to become Hertfordshire College of Higher Education. In the same year, Hatfield Polytechnic took over Balls Park. By 1977 more than ten per cent of the 4000 students came from more than forty different countries. The Students' Union Social Centre opened in 1977.

In 1982, John Illston succeeded Sir Norman Lindop as the director. A sports hall was built on the Hatfield Campus in 1984, and the number of students in that year was more than 5,000. The number of staff, in the same year, had increased to 824.

Neil Buxton became its director in 1987. The following year, Sir Ron Dearing and Buxton signed an agreement that gave the polytechnic accreditation from the Council for National Academic Awards. Hatfield was one of only 21 polytechnics, colleges and Scottish Central institutions to be accredited at the time. Hatfield was also, in that year, one of eight polytechnics accredited for research degrees. In 1989 it was given corporate status.

After John Major announced in 1991 that polytechnics were to be abolished, Hatfield Polytechnic announced its intention to apply for university status. In 1992 it became the University of Hertfordshire and Sir Brian Corby became the first Chancellor. It was the first university to run a bus company by making Uno bus public. The Hertfordshire College of Health Care and Nursing Studies and the Barnet College of Nursing and Midwifery merged with the university in 1993.

In 1992, Hatfield Polytechnic was granted university status by the British government and subsequently renamed the University of Hertfordshire. Its antecedent institution, Hatfield Technical College, was founded in 1948 and was identified as one of 25 Colleges of Technology in the United Kingdom in 1959.

In 1994 the St Albans Cathedral was chosen to hold the university's graduation ceremonies. The same year saw the first publication of league tables and Hertfordshire was named as the top new university. In 1995 its law school moved to St Albans. Sir Ian MacLaurin was appointed chancellor in 1996 and in 1997 the Learning Resource Centre opened.

=== 21st century ===
In 2000, Olivia de Havilland, cousin of Geoffrey de Havilland, visited the university to mark the inauguration of a project to build a new campus named after her cousin. The university's 50th anniversary was celebrated in 2002, by which time it had 21,695 students. In 2003 Tim Wilson succeeded Neil Buxton as vice-chancellor and the de Havilland campus opened.

Hertfordshire Sports Village also opened in 2003. In 2005 the university launched the Bedfordshire and Hertfordshire Postgraduate Medical School and School of Pharmacy to enhance medical education, training and research in the region. In 2006 the university opened its School of Film, Music and Media. The university opened the MacLaurin building in 2007, named in honour of its former chancellor Lord MacLaurin followed by a new law building in 2011. During this period, Hertfordshire became a lead academic sponsor of Elstree University Technical College, a university technical college which opened in September 2013. Hertfordshire is also the academic sponsor of Watford University Technical College

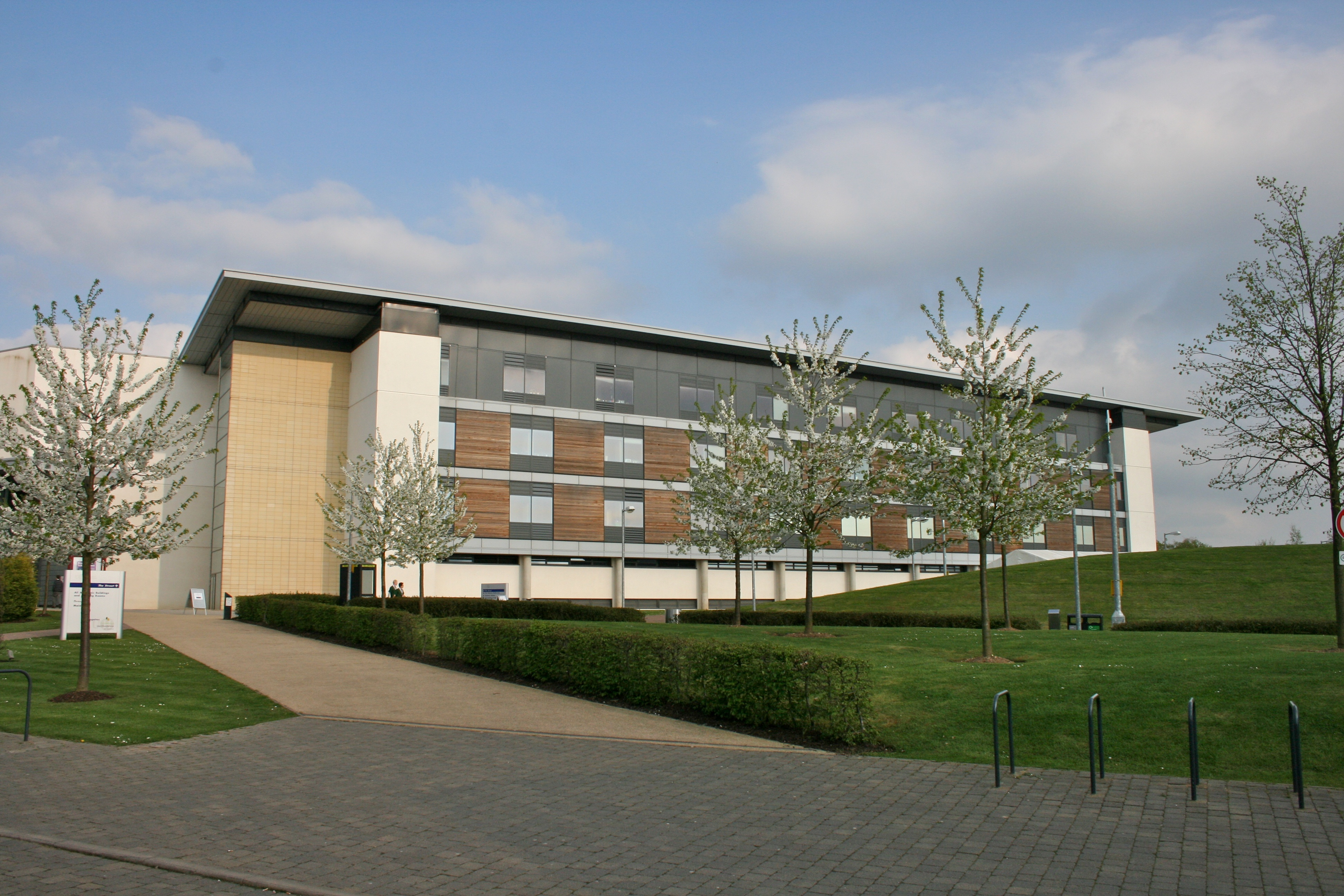
Main Building at de Havilland Campus

In 2010, Tim Wilson announced his intention to retire as vice-chancellor after more than 19 years at the university.

In 2011, Quintin McKellar replaced Tim Wilson as vice-chancellor of the university. Also on the same year, the Hatfield Beacon was restored and repositioned at the new Law School site. In the following year, the Kaspar project received a £180,000 donation from an international grant making foundation, which was used to further the university's research into the use of robotics to support the social development of children with autism.

In 2015, Hertfordshire adopted a policy of naming its buildings after people or organisations with a significant local or regional impact. These include Kate Bellingham, British engineer and television presenter and Alistair Spalding, chief executive and artistic director of Sadler's Wells Theatre. All of the halls are named after influential alumni who the university feels represent the attributes of Hertfordshire graduates. In these two cases, the halls were named in recognition of Bellingham and Spalding's attributes of intellectual depth and adaptability and professionalism, employability and enterprise. In the same year, the University of Hertfordshire was announced as one of the first recipients of the Race Equality Charter which is an initiative that recognises excellence in advancing racial equality in higher education. The charter was launched by the Equality Challenge Unit at the start of the 2015 academic year.

In 2020, the University of Hertfordshire Observatory celebrated its 50th anniversary, and revealed an eight-year-long exposure photograph, breaking the record of longest exposure. The artist, Regina Valkenborgh, was a Master's student in August 2012, when she set the pinhole camera attached to one of the telescope domes in the Observatory. The camera was then forgotten, and rediscovered in September 2020 by the Observatory's Principal Technical officer. The photograph registered the path of the sun over the sky during the 2,953 days it was exposed to it.

In 2024, the University of Hertfordshire hosted the European Maccabi Youth Games from 28 July to 6 August. This marked the first time the event was held in the United Kingdom, bringing together 900 young Jewish athletes from 14 countries, including Great Britain, United States, Netherlands, Germany, Denmark, Switzerland, South Africa, Hungary, Austria, Slovakia, France, Italy, Argentina, and Israel.

In November 2025, following a routine UK Visas and Immigration (UKVI) audit in June, the university was placed on a student visa "action plan" by the Home Office due to identified shortcomings in monitoring international students' immigration status and record-keeping. At least eight other UK higher education institutions have been placed on action plans in 2025. The university remains licensed to sponsor student visas.

== Organisation and administration ==
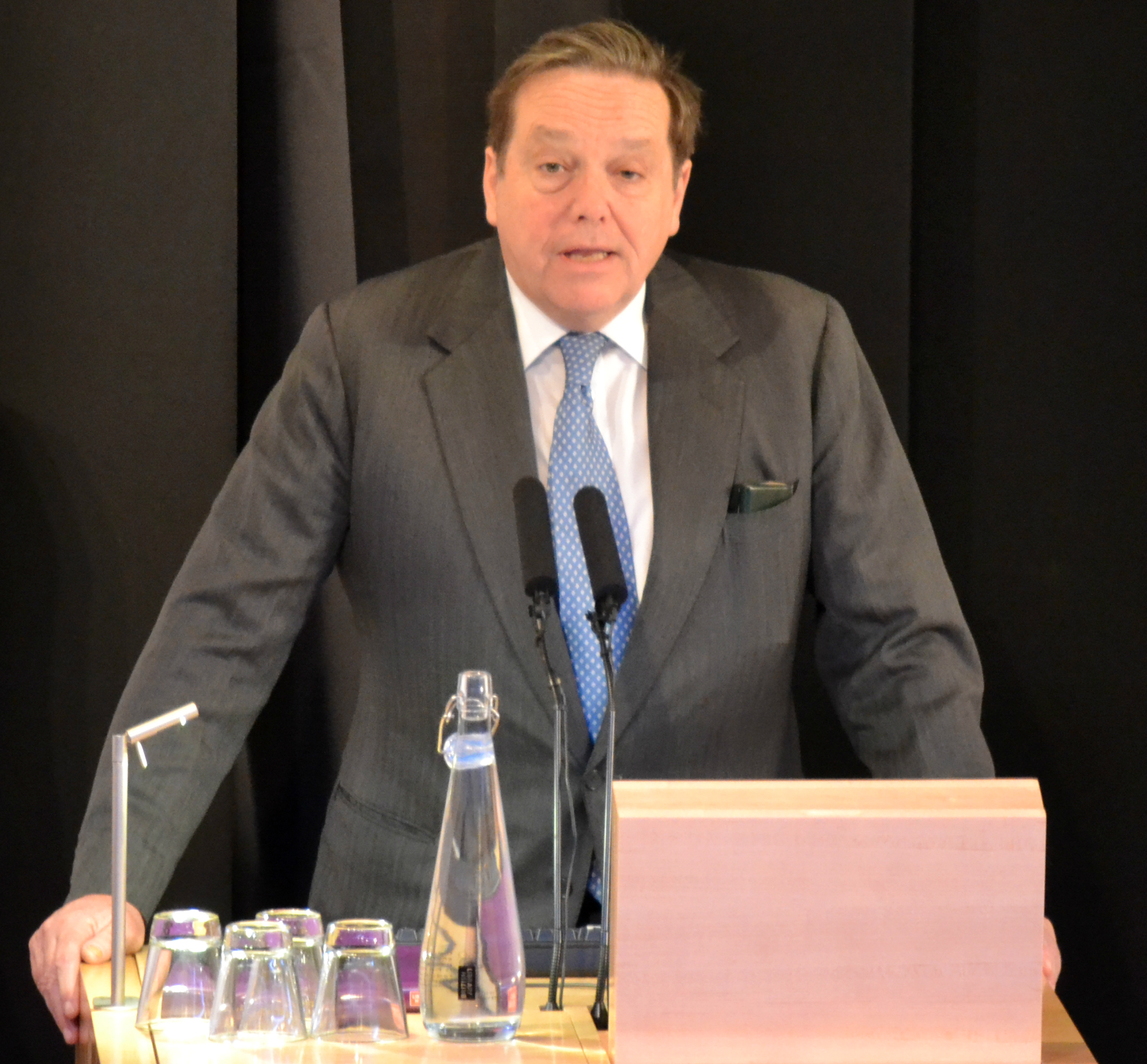
Robert Gascoyne-Cecil, 7th Marquess of Salisbury, former chancellor of the University of Hertfordshire

The university was established as an independent Higher Education Corporation in 1989 under the terms of the Education Reform Act (1989). The institution is an exempt charity. The board of governors has responsibility for running the university, while the academic board is responsible for academic quality and standards, academic policies, research and scholarship. The vice-chancellor oversees its day-to-day running. The current chancellor is Grace Ononiwu and the current vice-chancellor is Anthony Woodman.

The following people have been vice-chancellors of the university:

- Neil Buxton (1987–2003)
- Tim Wilson (2003–2010)
- Quintin McKellar (2011–2025)
- Anthony Woodman (2025–present)

The university runs on a three-term calendar in which the academic year is divided into three terms: Autumn (September–December), Spring (January–April), and Summer(April–May). Full-time undergraduate students take three to four courses every year for approximately eleven weeks before their quarterly academic breaks. The school year typically begins in late September and ends in mid-May.

=== Schools ===
The university offers over 700 degree courses in its six schools of study, within which there are around 50 academic departments and 24 research centres:

- Hertfordshire Business School
- Creative Arts
- Education
- Health, Medicine and Life Sciences
- Hertfordshire Law School
- Physics, Engineering and Computer Science

=== Charity ===
Being a Higher Education Corporation created by the 1988 Education Reform Act as amended by the 1992 Act, the University of Hertfordshire is an exempt charity as defined under the various Charities Acts.

The University of Hertfordshire has due regard to the Charity Commission's guidance on the reporting of public benefit, and particularly its supplementary guidance on the advancement of education, in accordance with the requirements of HEFCE, the Higher Education Funding Council for England, as the principal regulator of English higher education institutions under the Charities Act 2006.

The university has entered an agreement with the Office for Students (OFS) to demonstrate that access to programmes of full-time undergraduate education should not be limited on grounds of individual financial circumstances.

=== Affiliations and memberships ===
Hertfordshire is a member of Association of Commonwealth Universities, which is the representative body of 535 universities from 37 Commonwealth countries. It is the world's first and oldest international university network, established in 1913. It is also a member of University Alliance, a network of British universities, which was formed in 2006, adopting the name in 2007. University Alliance is a group of 'business engaged' universities that claim to drive innovation and enterprise growth through research and teaching. Its MBA programme is affiliated with Association of MBAs, the only global MBA-specific Accreditation and Membership Organisation.

== Campus ==
The university is primarily based on two campuses, College Lane and de Havilland. It previously owned a BioPark facility in Welwyn Garden City, a science park managed by Exemplas on behalf of the university. It also provides 6,000 square metres of laboratory and office space to life science and health technology businesses. As of 2014, there are currently 27 permanent and virtual tenants.

Additionally, a pool and climbing wall are among its sports facilities. It also has the Weston auditorium, for arts events, two art galleries, and owns one of the highly recognised teaching observatories in the United Kingdom.

With over 34,000 students, Hertfordshire has a global alumni of over 165,000.

=== College Lane Campus ===
The main site of the university remains the College Lane campus, which houses the original Hatfield Technical College building. Notable among the buildings in this campus is the university's Learning Resource Centre, a combined library and computer centre. There is also a substantial collection of halls of residence and student houses, and the University of Hertfordshire Students' Union is headquartered at College Lane campus. The College Lane campus is also the location of Hertfordshire International College, which is part of the Navitas group, providing a direct pathway for international students to the university. The Hertfordshire Intensive Care & Emergency Simulation Centre is also located at College Lane. In 2016, the purpose-designed Science Building was opened, primarily offering teaching laboratories, a range of research laboratories and other specialist facilities. This was renamed to 'Nexus' in September 2024 to accompany the grand opening of the Spectra building opposite. Spectra, which cost £100m to construct, is a five-storey facility for the School of Physics, Engineering and Computer Science and contains several computer rooms and research areas, a robotics lab, racing simulator, and large electronics CDIO workshop.

=== de Havilland Campus ===
The £120-million de Havilland campus, which was built by Carillion, opened in September 2003 and is situated within 15 minutes walk of College Lane, and is built on a former British Aerospace site. This campus also houses its own Learning Resource Centre, a combined library and computer centre. Hertfordshire Sports Village which includes a gym, swimming pool, and squash courts is also on this site. The large Weston Auditorium is present on the de Havilland campus, adjacent to the Learn Resource Centre. The auditorium has a capacity of 450 and can host talks both by university lecturers for students and for guest lecturers for guests and students, music and film events, and dance events. The campus also contains 11 halls of residence; named after local towns and villages. Ashwell and Welwyn are examples of the buildings, with the towns being present in Hertfordshire. The campus is mostly themed around law and business, having its business school located on the campus as well as its law school. A full-scale, mock-up courtroom is present, being available for use for students studying a law degree. Along with Northampton University, it provides the 2-year accelerated law degree.

=== Bayfordbury Campus ===
A third 50-hectare site in Bayfordbury houses the university's astronomical and atmospheric physics remote sensing observatory, Regional Science Learning Centre, and field stations for biology and geography programmes.

Situated approximately 6 miles (10 kilometres) from the main campus, it houses one of the largest astronomical teaching observatories in the United Kingdom. The observatory has formed part of the astronomy-related degree programmes since it opened in 1970.

The seven optical telescopes at Bayfordbury campus to observe detailed images of objects in space. Moreover, the five newest telescopes are also able to be operated remotely. The 4.5-metre radio telescope and 3-dish 115-metre baseline interferometer allow a completely different view of the universe. These are connected to 21 cm line receivers to detect the neutral hydrogen in the galaxy and extragalactic radio sources.

=== Meridian House ===
Home to some Schools within the Health and Human Faculty, this building is located on the edge of Hatfield town centre, off College Lane campus. Meridian House is the location of eight clinical skills laboratories for nursing and midwifery programmes of the university. Skills facilities and ambulances for paramedic training are also situated at Meridian House, aside from the counselling programme and staff offices.

=== Facilities ===
==== Art collection ====
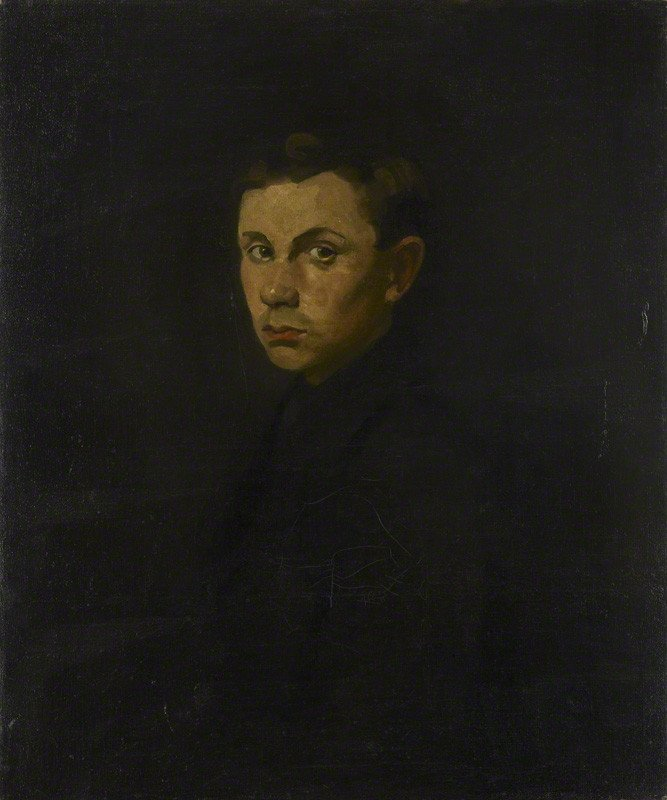
Ben Nicholson, British painter of abstract compositions whose work is included in the University of Hertfordshire art collection

The University of Hertfordshire holds over 500 artworks in its art collection. The ethos of the UH Art Collection is to present modern and contemporary art in places where people study, work and visit. This reflects the University of Hertfordshire's determination to provide not only an attractive education setting but also one which will inform, enlighten and enhance the life of its students, staff and the local community. The UH Art Collection was established in 1952, as part of Hertfordshire Country Council's commitment to the post-war programme. The collection has a diverse portfolio including photography, textiles, ceramics, sculpture, mixed media, and works by Ben Nicholson, Barbara Hepworth, Andy Goldsworthy, Alan Davie, and Diane MacLean.

==== Transportation ====
Hertfordshire operates a regular shuttle bus service, Park and Ride, which connects 800 parking spaces at Angerland Common with its College Lane and de Havilland Campus facilities. The scheme started in 2006, when it was initially provided with the 700-car facility at Angerland Common, off South Way, Hatfield, in a bid to reduce car traffic on the surrounding roads.

Uno (formerly UniversityBus) is a bus service operated by the University of Hertfordshire, serving members of the general public, and also its own students and staff, at a discounted rate. In 1992, the University of Hertfordshire created Uno to provide student transport to the university from local areas; improve east-west travel across the county of Hertfordshire; and create new links between Hertfordshire and North London.

=== Gallery ===
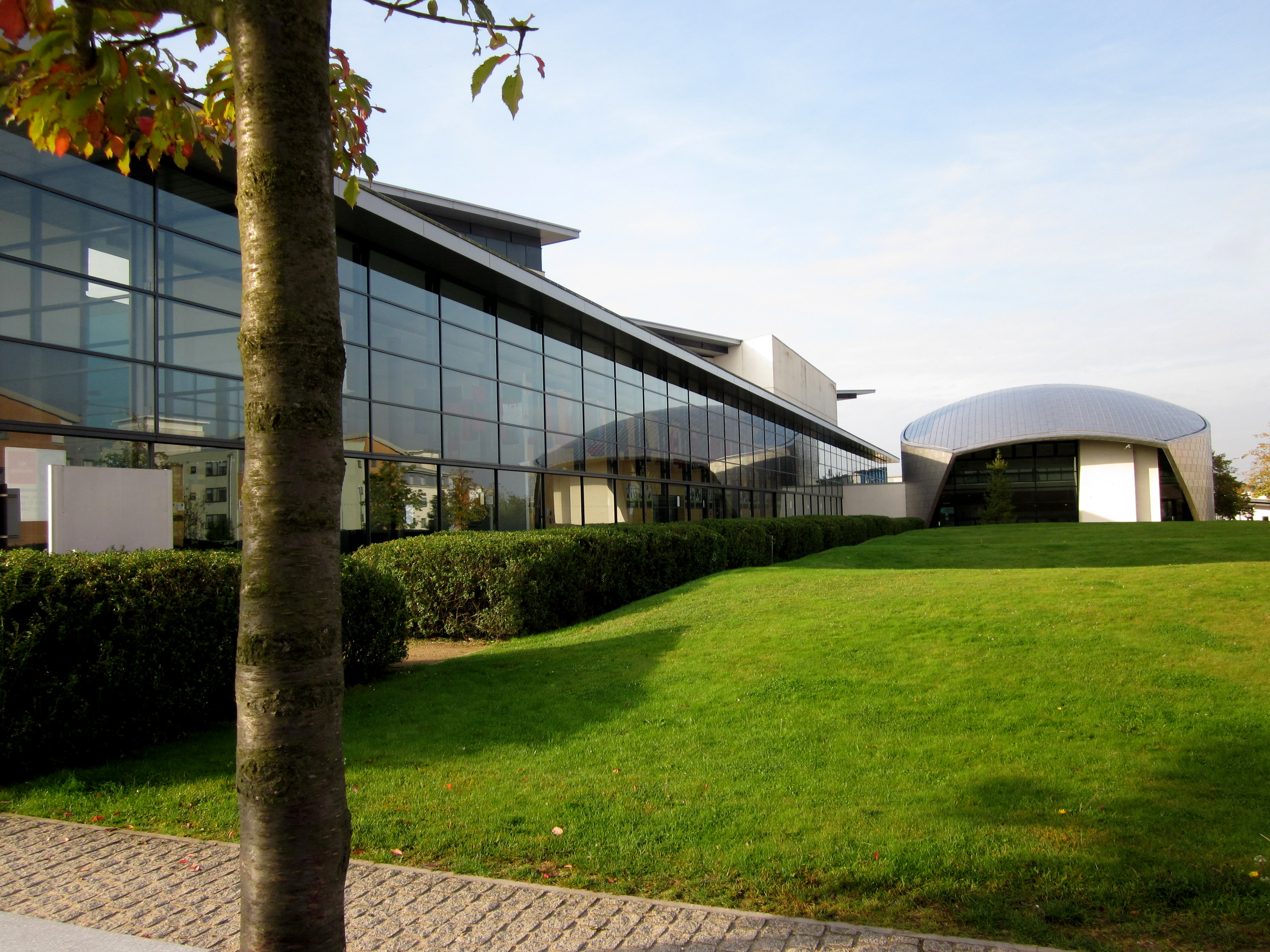
de Havilland Campus

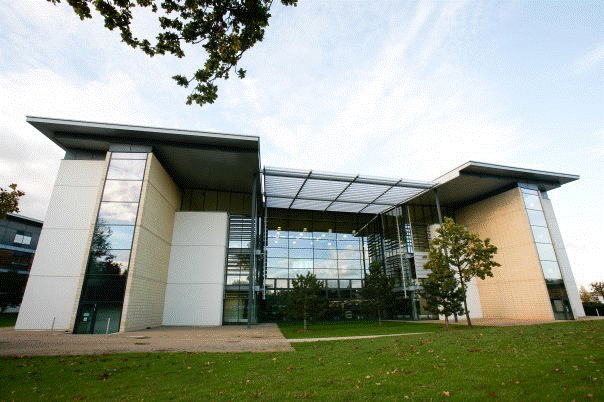
Learning Resource Centre at de Havilland

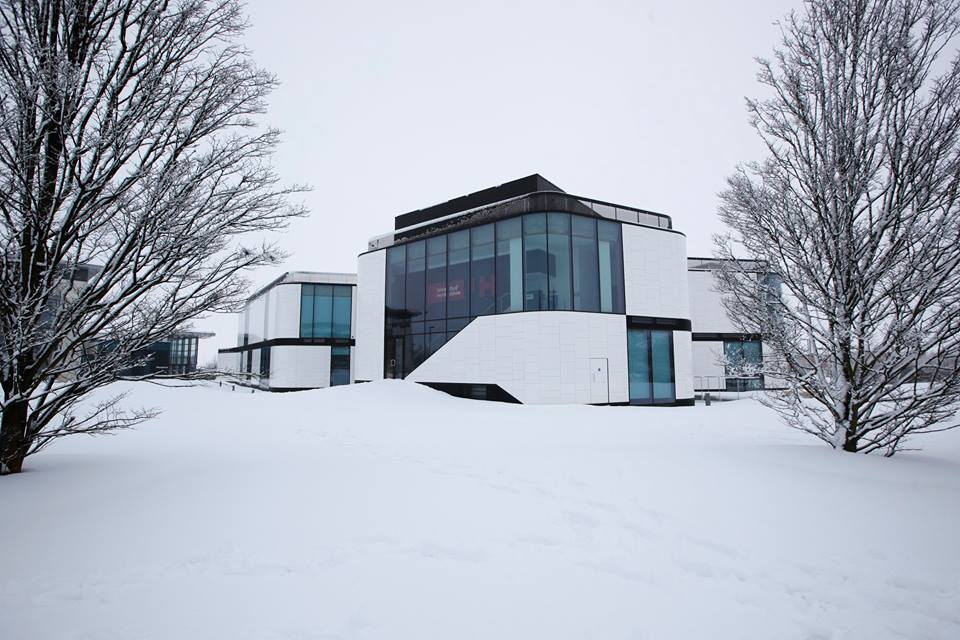
Law Court Building

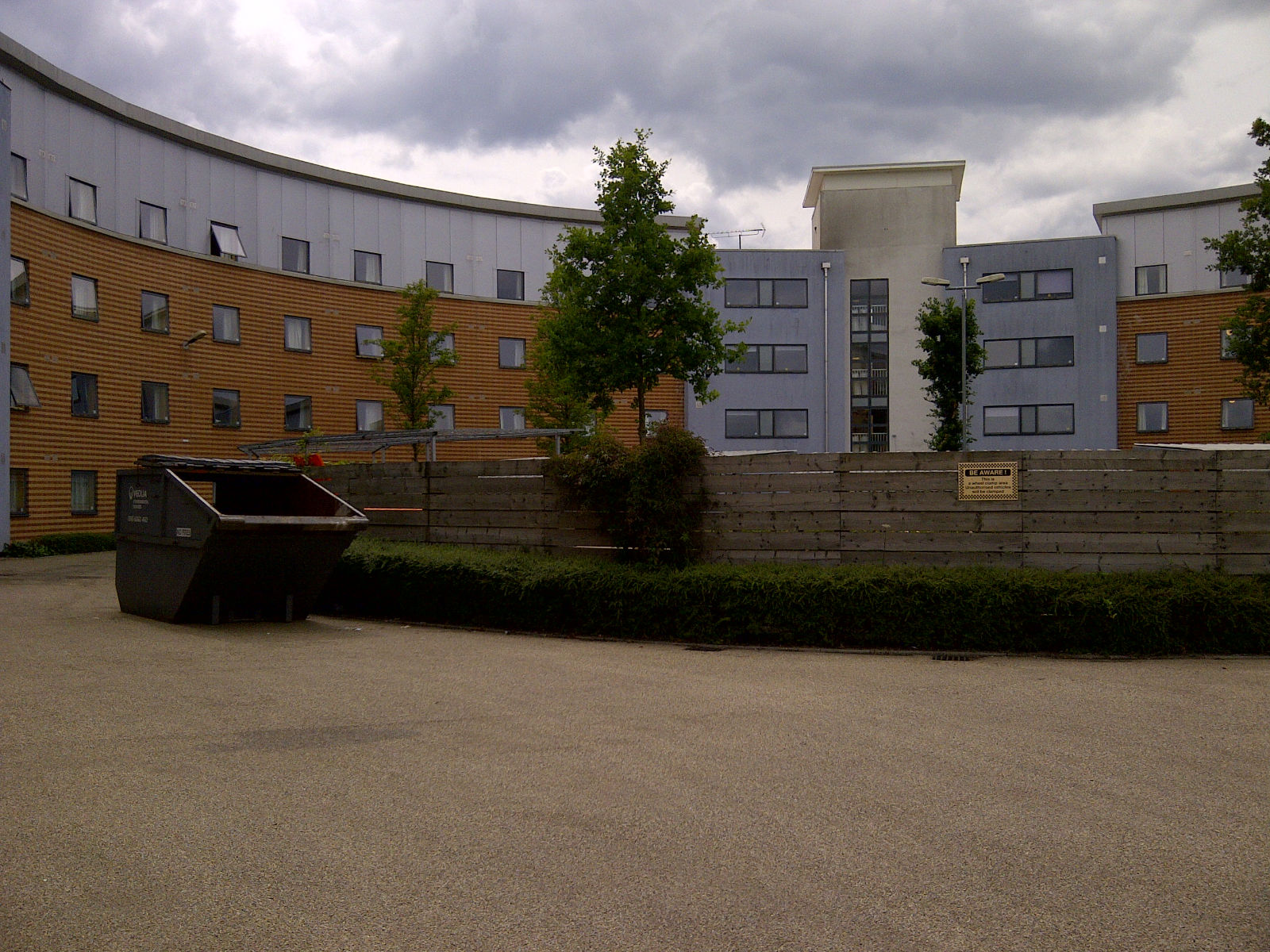
Halls of Residence at de Havilland

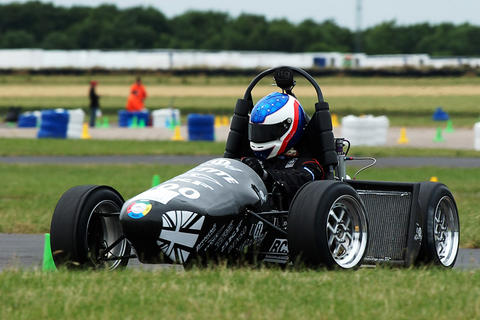
University of Hertfordshire Racing

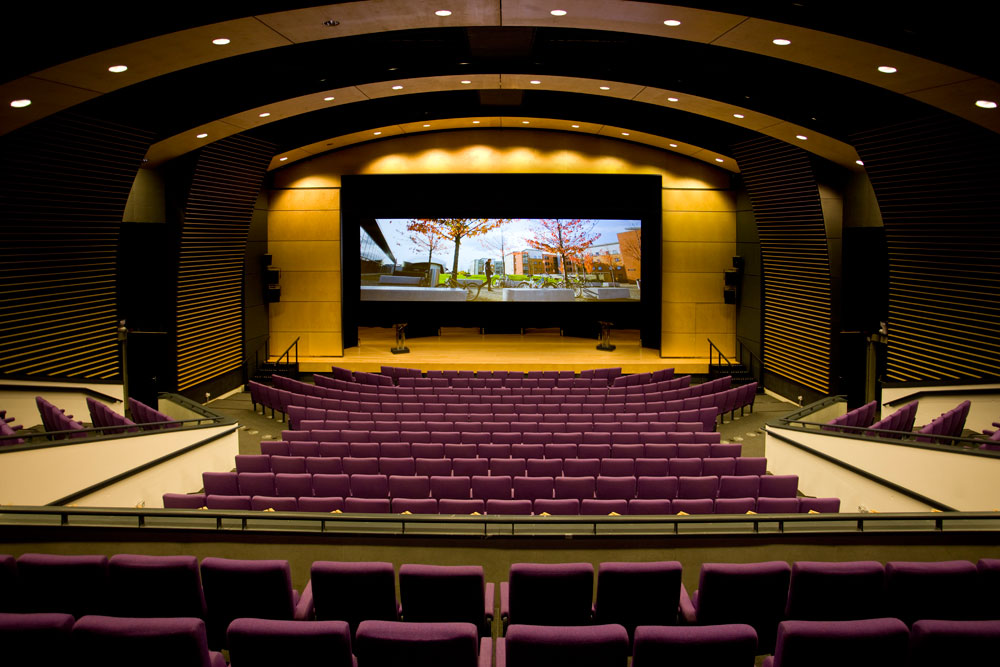
Weston Auditorium

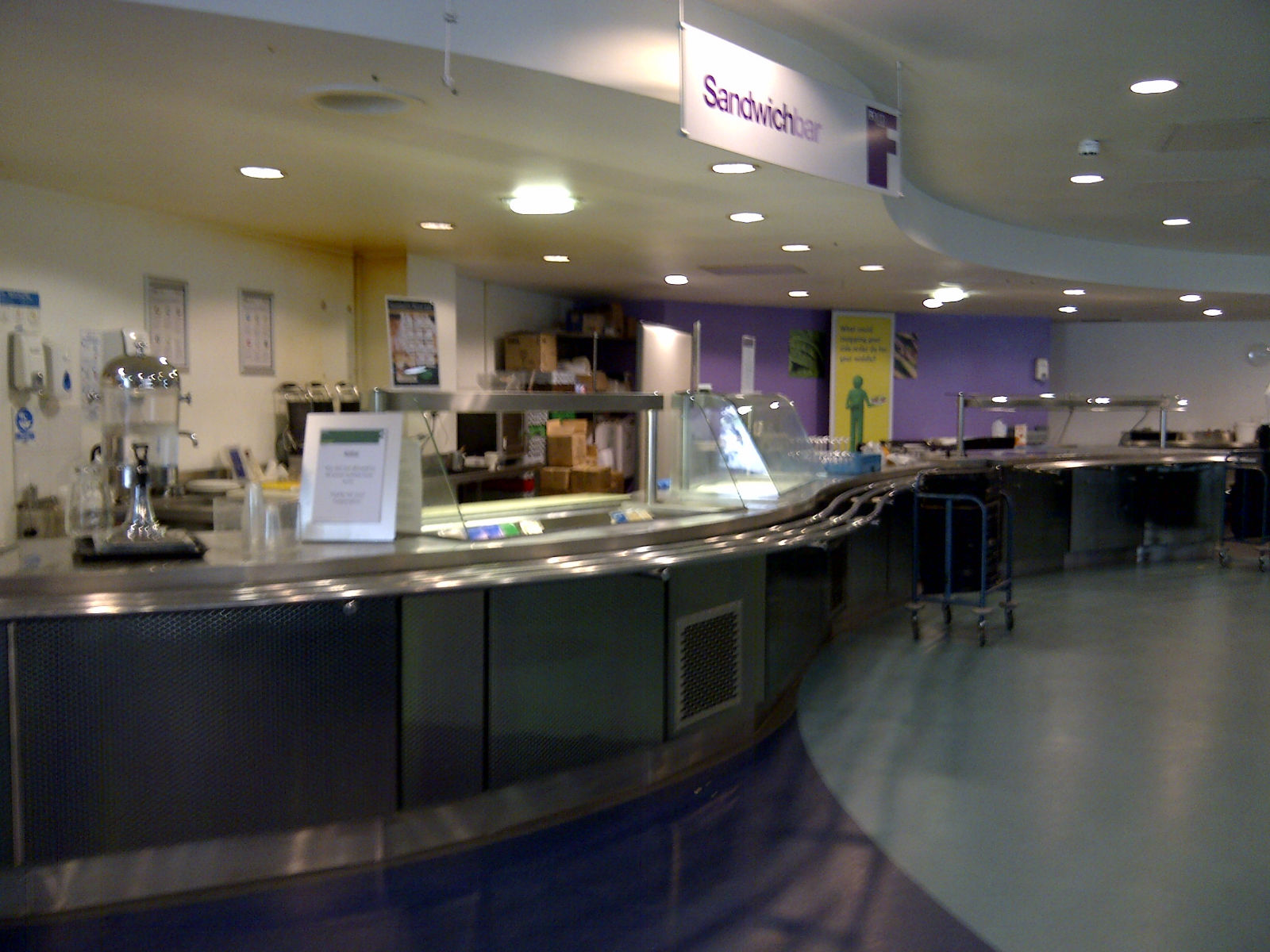
Sandwich Bar

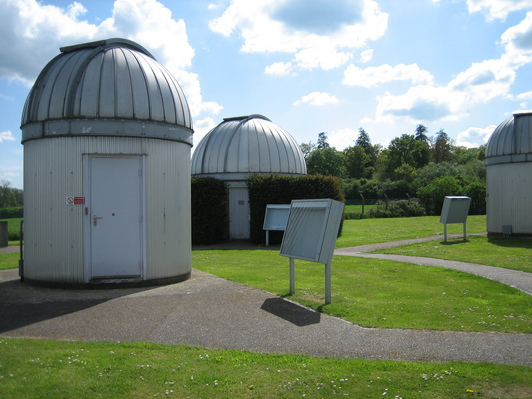
Bayfordbury Observatory

== University symbols ==
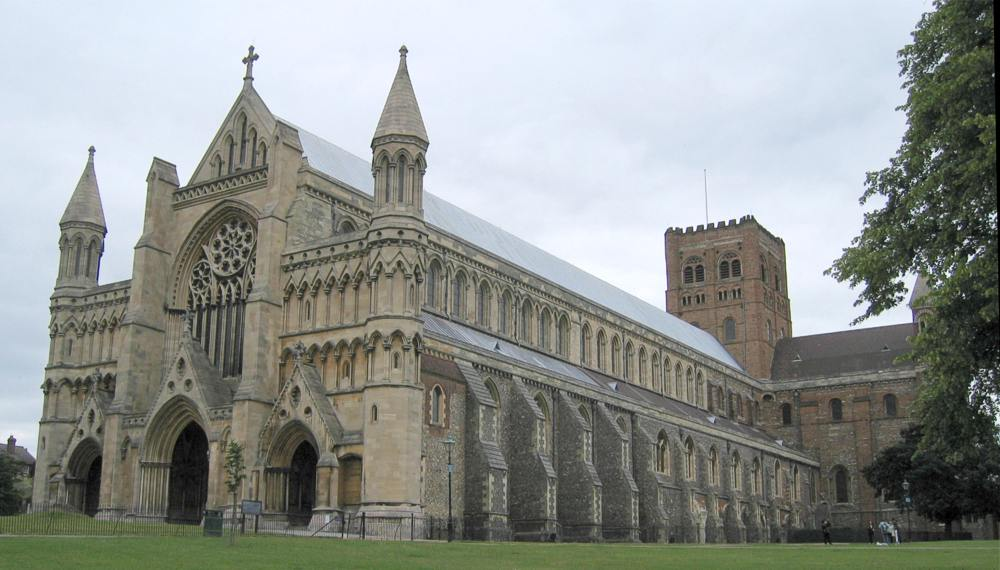
The Cathedral and Abbey Church of St Alban, the location of the university's annual award ceremonies

=== Academic dress ===
The University of Hertfordshire prescribes academic dress for its members. In accordance with tradition, Hertfordshire's academic dress consists of a gown, a cap and a hood. The black gown and square cap familiar to all readers of the Beano had evolved into their present form in England by the end of the Reformation. The hood, which is now the distinctive mark of a university-level qualification, is medieval in origin, and was originally functional.

=== Ceremonial mace ===
The ceremonial mace was produced in 1999 by craftsman Martyn Pugh, a Freeman of the Worshipful Company of Goldsmiths, member of the British Jewellers Association and a Founder Member of the Association of British Designer Silversmiths. Its design symbolises the university's origins, expertise and associations. Its shape is inspired by the shape of an aeroplane wing, symbolising the university's origin in the aviation industry. The head of the mace is engraved with zodiac symbols representing the university's contribution to astronomy and also contains the DNA double helix representing the biological sciences and microprocessor chips representing information and communications technology.

=== Coat of arms ===
The university's coat of arms was granted in 1992. The shield is charged with an oak tree taken from the coat of arms of the former Hatfield Rural District, the constellation Perseus (containing the binary star Algol) and a representation of the letter "H" recalling the emblem of the former Hatfield Polytechnic. The crest, a Phoenix rising from an astral crown, represents the university's evolution from a technical college training apprentices for the aviation industry. The two harts supporting the shield represent the county of Hertfordshire, with the covered cups referring to A.S. Butler, who donated the land upon which the original campus was built. A scroll bears the motto Seek Knowledge Throughout Life.

=== University logo ===
The standard university logo comprises the university name and the UH symbol in a horizontal panel. There is an exclusion zone equivalent to the height of the H in the logo above, below and to the right of the logo. The university has created an endorsed version of the logo to be used where legibility is an issue with the standard logo. It comprises just the university name in a horizontal panel. Although the university brands its logo in various colours, the standard colours are black and white.

== Academic profile ==
=== Rankings and reputation ===
Rankings
National rankings
- Complete (2027): 70
- Guardian (2027): 37
- Times / Sunday Times (2027): 59

Global rankings
- ARWU (2026): 801–900
- QS (2027): 851–900
- THE (2026): 601–800

The University of Hertfordshire is recognised as one of the top twenty universities in the world to study animation.

According to the UK Graduate Outcomes Survey, 84.5% of full-time undergraduate and postgraduate students were in employment or further study 15 months after graduation (2022–23).

University of Hertfordshire ranked 601–800 among world universities in Times Higher Education World University Rankings in 2019.

It was awarded the Entrepreneurial University of the Year by Times Higher Education in 2010. In 2026, it was ranked 82nd by The Complete University Guide among UK universities.

=== QAA and OIA ===
The university underwent a Higher Education Review by the Quality Assurance Agency (QAA) in 2015, which concluded that it met UK expectations for academic standards and quality.

According to the annual statistics from the Office of the Independent Adjudicator, the university issued 44 completion of procedures letters in relation to student complaints in 2024. This is below the median of 126, possibly suggesting greater student satisfaction when compared to universities of a similar size.

== Research ==
The university has three research institutes: Health and Human Sciences Research Institute; Science and Technology Research Institute; Social Sciences, Arts and Humanities Research Institute. It also has an expanding research profile in nursing, psychology, history, philosophy, physics and computer science.

=== HR Excellence in Research ===
In recognition of development activities related to research careers and the position of researchers at the university, the European Commission awarded the University of Hertfordshire the right to use the HR Excellence in Research logo in spring 2010.

=== Research Excellence Framework ===
In the Research Excellence Framework (REF) 2021 assessment, over 78% of the university's research was rated 'world leading' and 'internationally excellent'.

=== Kaspar ===
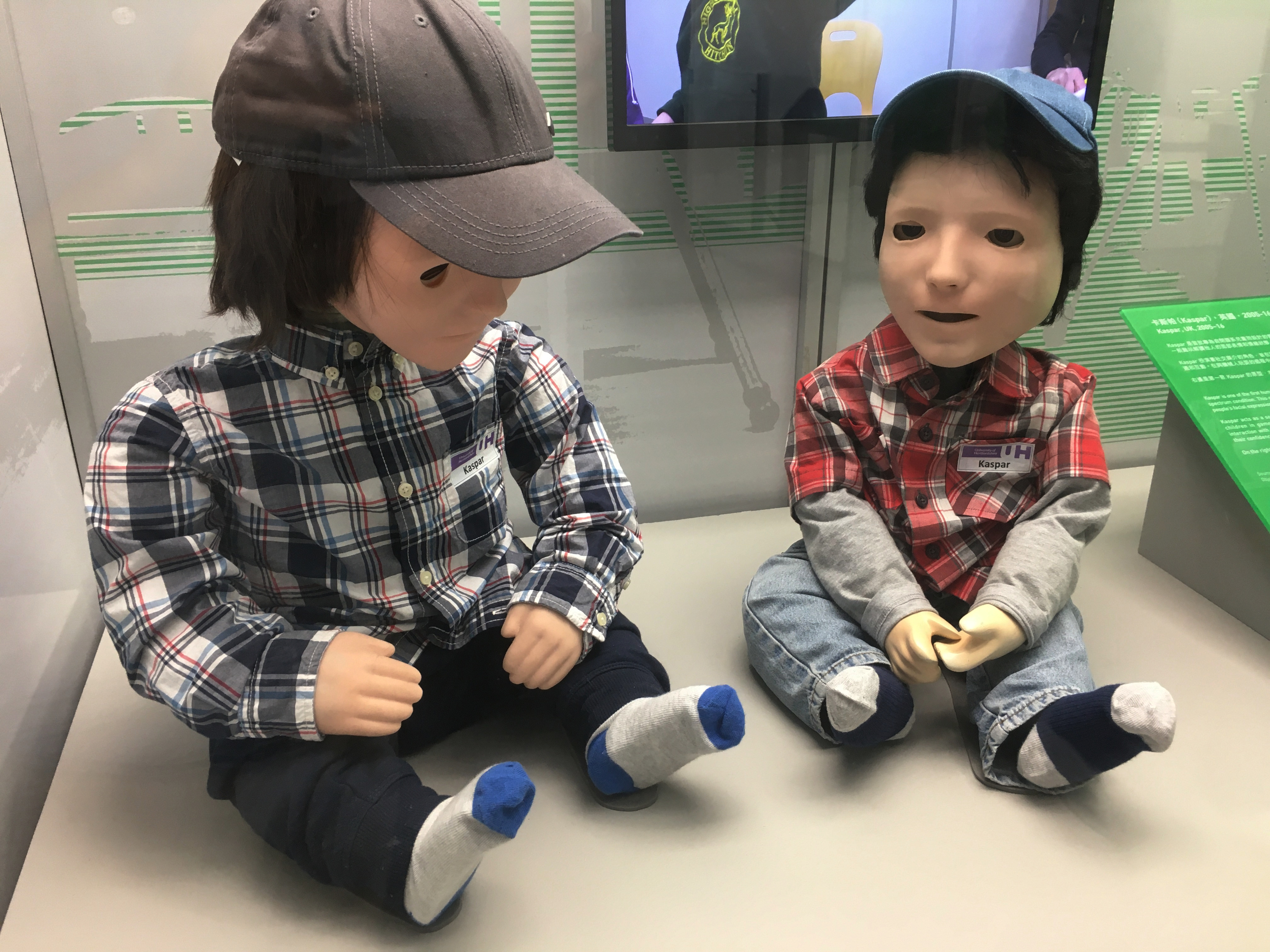
Kaspar

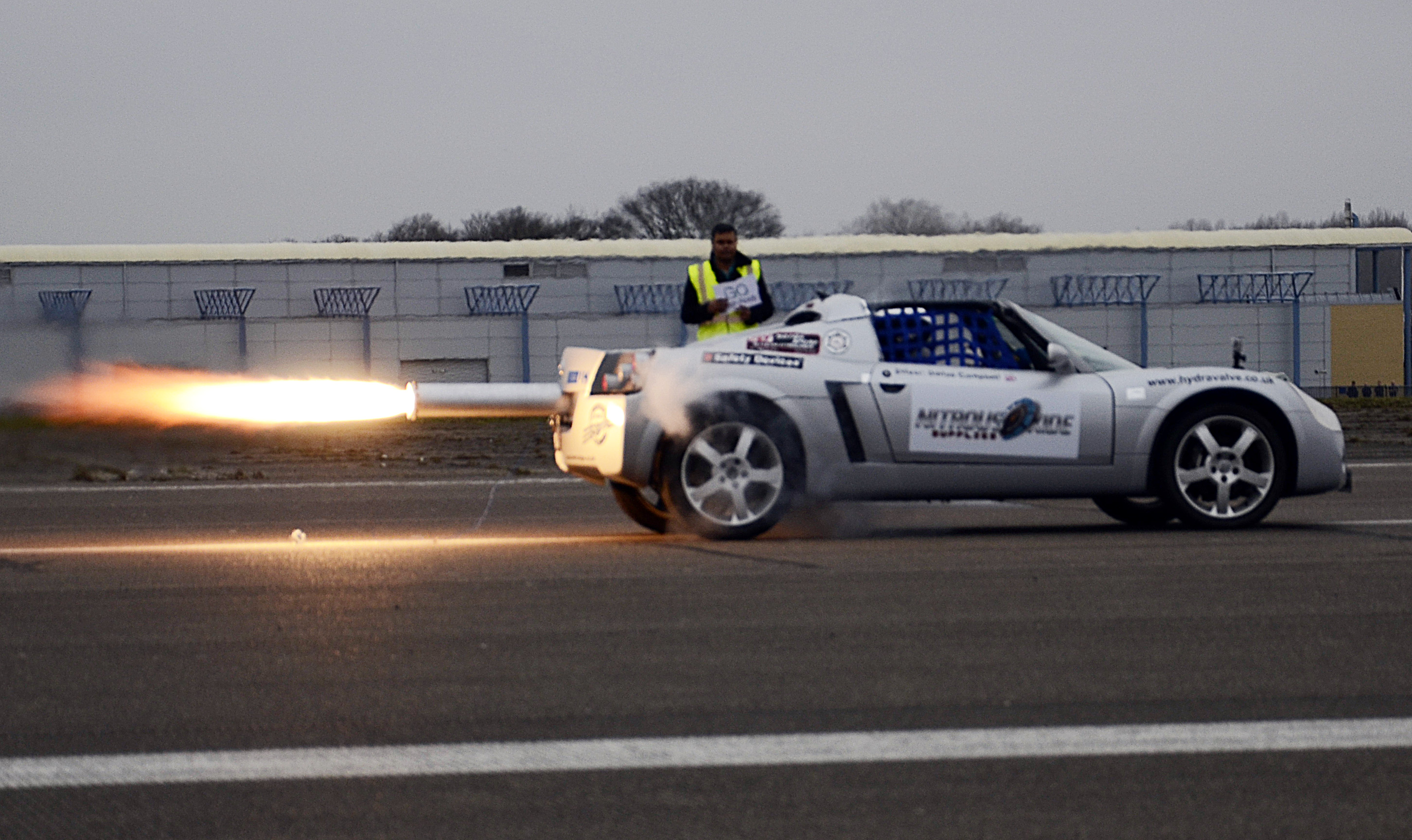
Rocket-powered car designed by the University of Hertfordshire

Kaspar, a social robot, has been designed by the University of Hertfordshire's Adaptive Systems Research Group (ASRG). The Kaspar project began in 2005, drawing upon previous research to develop a social robot for engaging autistic children in a variety of play scenarios. The aim was to research whether interacting and communicating with Kaspar would help children with autism interact and communicate more easily with people. This is important because there is mounting evidence that early intervention for children with autism may change the child's development trajectory. Kaspar is a research tool with programmed responses adapted to be used by an autistic child in a safe, non-judgemental environment. The Kaspar research has shown that robots may provide a safe and predictable tool for children with autism, that enables the children to learn social interaction and communication skills, addressing specific therapeutic and educational objectives (for example, being able to engage in direct eye-contact or shared eye-gaze), in an enjoyable play context.

=== Rocket powered car ===
As part of the final year Aerospace Project, students and staff from the University of Hertfordshire designed, built and tested a full-sized rocket-powered car under the mentorship of Ray Wilkinson, a senior professor from the Department of Aerospace and Mechanical Engineering. With support from BBC Bang Goes the Theory and host Dallas Campbell, the Vauxhall VX220 sports car, was fitted with a large hybrid rocket motor that is designed to produce over half a tonne of thrust was tested in the Duxford Aerodrome. The project got lot of attention for its unprecedented success story and was showcased in local places to build interest in STEM.

== Student life ==
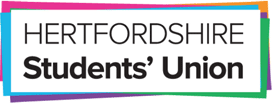
Logo of Hertfordshire Students' Union

The main source of nightlife is the Forum, which houses three entertainment spaces, a restaurant, a café, multiple bars and on-site parking. Hertfordshire Students' Union (HSU) is the Students' Union of the University of Hertfordshire. The Students' Union Social Centre was opened in 1977. The Hatfield Technical College's management encouraged the establishment of a Student Representative Council (SRC) in 1982, to create a sense of unity and expand the social activities of its day students. The SRC was affiliated to the National Union of Students but initially restricted itself largely to social activities. After 1988 it began to campaign on issues such as improvements to the canteen, lifting the ban on religious or political activity within the then Hatfield Polytechnic, and for a formal students' union. The sectarian ban was finally lifted in 1992 and a Union granted in 1995. However, the canteen continued to be an issue throughout the 2000s. The Students' Union at the University of Hertfordshire represents all students in the university by organising campus activities and running different clubs and societies, from sports to entertainment.

=== Sport ===
==== Rowing ====
The University of Hertfordshire Rowing Club is affiliated to British Rowing (boat code UHE) and Dave Bell became a British champion after winning the men's double sculls title at the 2010 British Rowing Championships.

==== American Football ====
The University of Hertfordshire American Football team, The Hurricanes, is affiliated to the British Universities American Football League (BUAFL) Premier League South

== Notable alumni ==
=== Arts, science, and academia ===
- Whitney Adebayo – television personality and businessowner
- Jean Bacon – Professor of Distributed Systems, Computer Laboratory, University of Cambridge
- Tony Banham – founder of the Hong Kong War Diary project
- Raphael J. Chryslar – aerospace engineer, philanthropist and author. Founder and chief designer of the proposed World Technology Center
- Nick Hector – British Canadian documentary filmmaker
- Sean Hedges-Quinn – British sculptor and animator
- Diane Maclean – sculptor and environmental artist
- David Mba – Vice Chancellor, Birmingham City University
- Ben Mosley – expressive artist
- Ciarán O'Keeffe – psychologist specialising in parapsychology and forensic psychology

=== Government, politics, and society ===
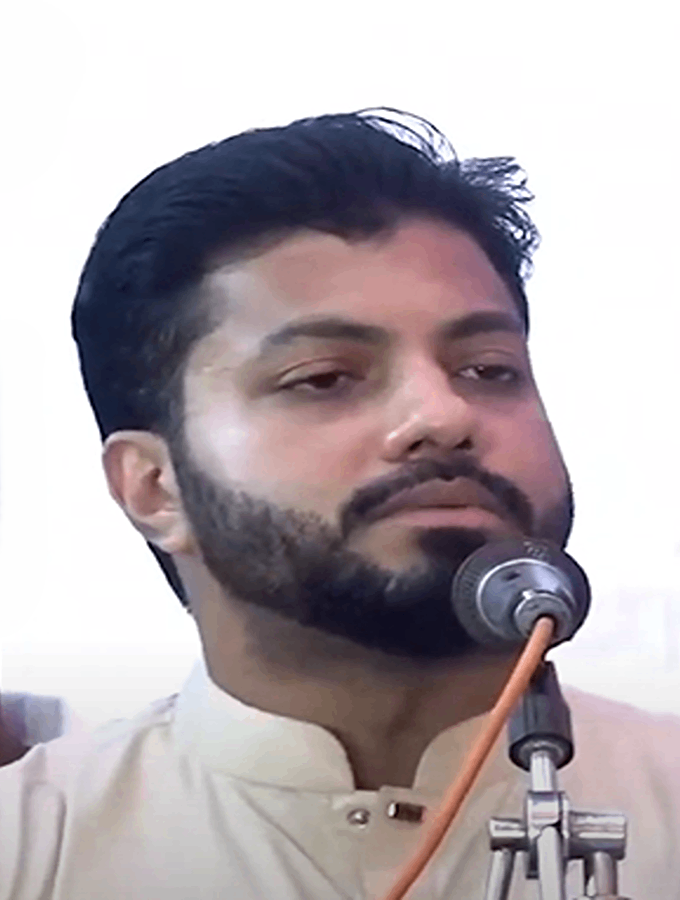
Ishraque Hossain, State Minister of Liberation War Affairs and MP
- Abdulaziz bin Abdullah – Deputy minister of foreign affairs in Saudi Arabia
- John Cryer – English Labour Party politician
- Onn Hafiz Ghazi – 19th Menteri Besar of Johor in Malaysia
- Richard Howitt – member of the European Parliament for the Labour Party for the East of England
- Akif Çağatay Kılıç – current Minister of Youth and Sports of Turkey
- Darell Leiking – former minister of the international trade & industry of Malaysia (MITI) and current MP in Malaysian Parliament
- Gwen O'Mahony – former MLA in the 39th Parliament of British Columbia
- Ishraque Hossain – State Minister of Liberation War Affairs and Bangladeshi MP
- Mark Oaten – British former politician who was a senior member of the Liberal Democrats
- Fiona Onasanya – Labour Member of Parliament
- Mohamad Sarif Pudin – acting Commander of the Royal Brunei Navy (RBN) since 2023
- Lawrie Quinn – Labour politician in England
- Prince Raj – member of Indian Parliament
- Claire Ward – British Labour Party politician
- Sarah West – first woman to be appointed to command a major warship in the Royal Navy

=== Business and finance ===
- Chris Gubbey – auto executive for General Motors (Hatfield Polytechnic)
- Luke Scheybeler – British designer and entrepreneur
- Spindrella Kelly – Nigerian entrepreneur

=== Media and entertainment ===
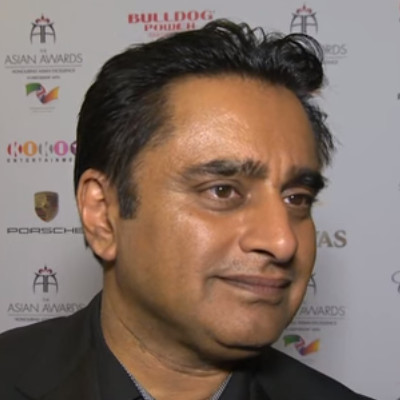
Sanjeev Bhaskar, OBE, comedian and Chancellor of the University of Sussex
- Kate Bellingham – British engineer and BBC presenter
- Yulia Brodskaya – artist and illustrator known for her handmade, elegant, and detailed paper illustrations
- Sanjeev Bhaskar – British comedian, actor and broadcaster
- Matthew Buckley – British actor
- Stevyn Colgan – British writer, artist and speaker
- Sonia Deol – British radio and television presenter, currently at GlobalBC in Vancouver, Canada (previously BBC Asian Network)
- Des de Moor – member of The Irresistible Force with Morris Gould aka Mixmaster Morris; co-organiser of Ambient techno industrial techno evening, Madhouse, at The Fridge, Brixton in 1988
- Guvna B – urban contemporary gospel rap artist and composer
- Bob Johnson – British guitarist formerly in the electric folk band Steeleye Span
- Chris Knowles, member of anarchist punk rock collective Hagar the Womb, also known as industrial techno DJ Chris Liberator
- Lisa Lazarus – British model and actress
- Helen Lederer – comedian, writer and actress who emerged as part of the alternative comedy boom at the beginning of the 1980s
- Upen Patel – British male model and film actor
- Flux Pavilion – British dubstep musician (real name Josh Steele)

=== Sports and athletics ===
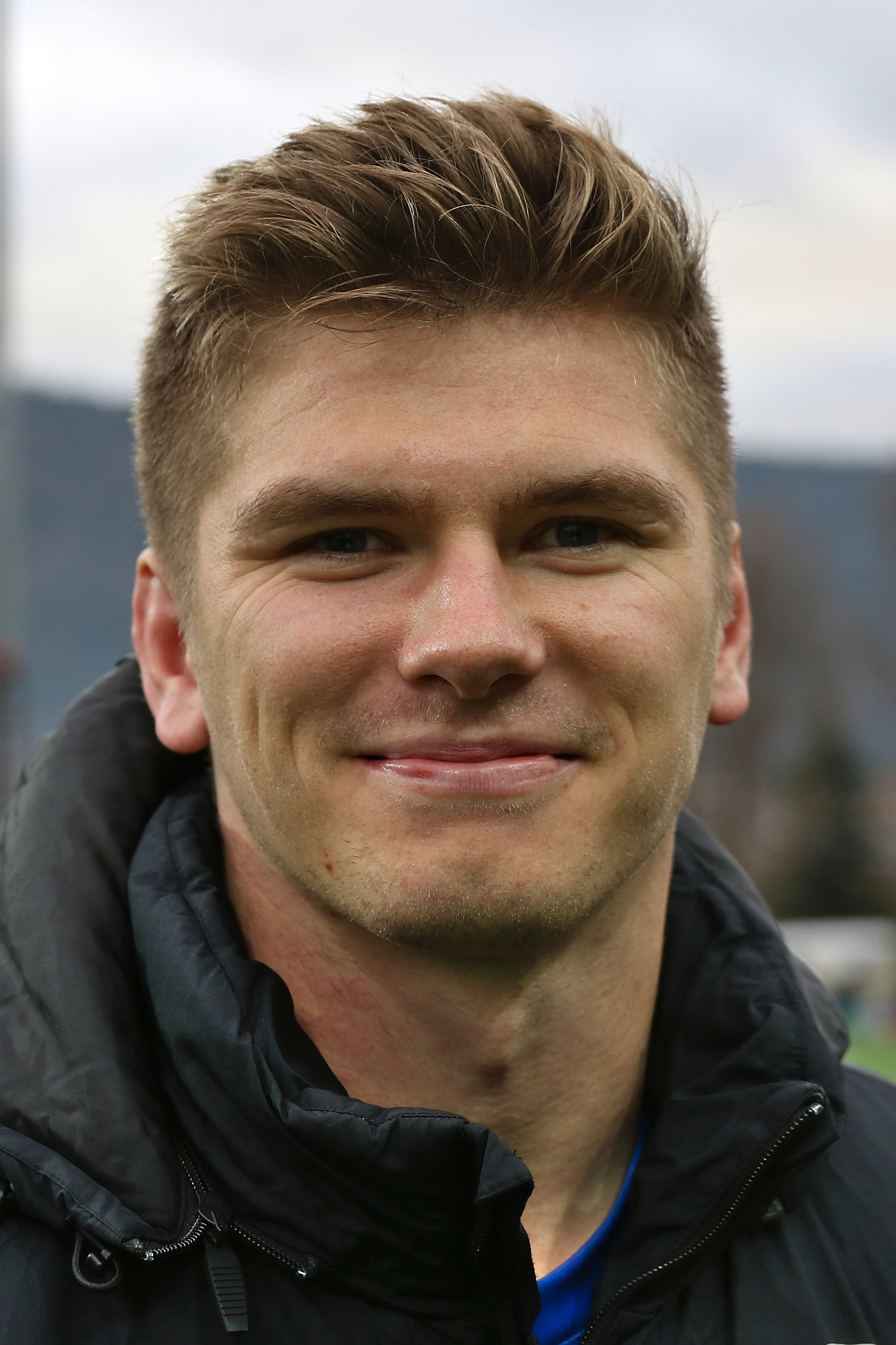
Owen Farrell, English professional rugby union player for Saracens
- Ajaz Akhtar – former British cricketer
- Steve Borthwick – former English rugby union footballer who played lock for Saracens and Bath
- Noah Cato – rugby union player
- Iain Dowie – football manager
- Owen Farrell – England, Saracens rugby union player
- Gavin Fisher – former chief designer of the Williams Formula One team.
- Alex Goode – professional British rugby union player
- Aaron Liffchak – rugby union footballer
- Michael Owen – rugby union player: former Wales and British & Irish Lions captain
- Sachin Patel – former British cricketer
- Tom Ryder – rugby union player
- Alex Skeel – English football coach, domestic violence survivor

== See also ==
- Armorial of UK universities
- Interactive Design Institute
- List of universities in the UK
- Post-1992 universities
