= Robert Gascoyne-Cecil, 7th Marquess of Salisbury =

British politician (born 1946)

The Most Honourable The Marquess of Salisbury KG KCVO PC DL
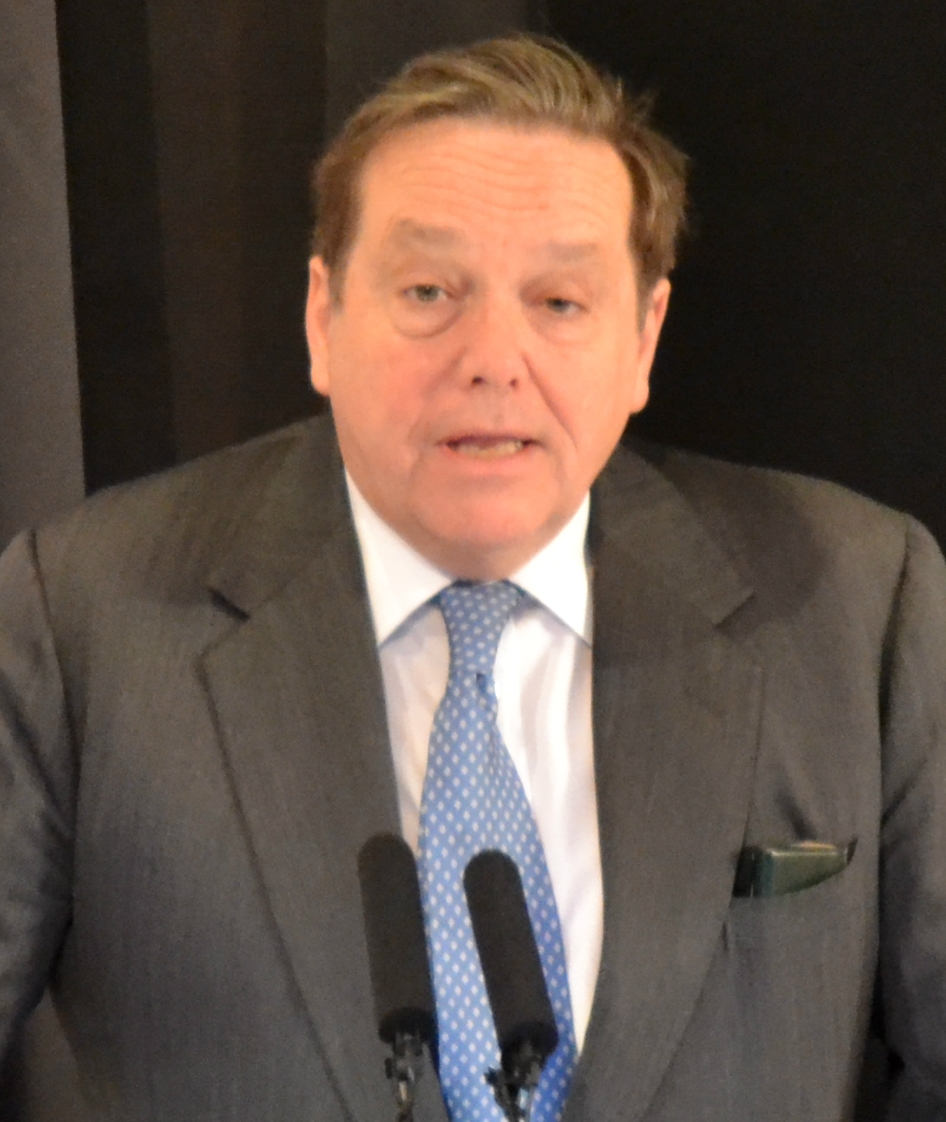
- Lord Salisbury in 2013

Chancellor of the University of Hertfordshire
- In office 7 October 2005 – November 2025
- Preceded by: The Lord MacLaurin of Knebworth
- Succeeded by: Grace Ononiwu

Leader of the Opposition in the Lords Shadow Leader of the House of Lords
- In office 2 May 1997 – 3 December 1998
- Leader: John Major; William Hague
- Preceded by: The Lord Richard
- Succeeded by: The Lord Strathclyde

Leader of the House of Lords Lord Keeper of the Privy Seal
- In office 20 July 1994 – 2 May 1997
- Prime Minister: John Major
- Preceded by: The Lord Wakeham
- Succeeded by: The Lord Richard

Parliamentary Under-Secretary of State for Defence
- In office 22 April 1992 – 20 July 1994
- Prime Minister: John Major
- Preceded by: Kenneth Carlisle & The Earl of Arran
- Succeeded by: The Lord Henley

Member of the House of Lords
- Lord Temporal
- Hereditary peerage 29 April 1992 – 11 November 1999
- Preceded by: The 6th Marquess of Salisbury
- Succeeded by: Seat abolished
- Life peerage 17 November 1999 – 8 June 2017

Member of Parliament for South Dorset
- In office 3 May 1979 – 18 May 1987
- Preceded by: Evelyn King
- Succeeded by: Ian Bruce

Personal details
- Born: 30 September 1946 (age 80)
- Party: Conservative
- Spouse: Hannah Stirling (m. 1970)
- Children: Five
- Parent: Robert Gascoyne-Cecil, 6th Marquess of Salisbury (father)
- Education: Christ Church, Oxford

Robert Michael James Gascoyne-Cecil, 7th Marquess of Salisbury, Baron Gascoyne-Cecil (born 30 September 1946) is a British Conservative politician. From 1979 to 1987 he represented South Dorset in the House of Commons, and in the 1990s he was Leader of the House of Lords under his courtesy title of Viscount Cranborne. Lord Salisbury lives in one of England's largest historic houses, the 17th-century Hatfield House in Hertfordshire, and formerly served as Chancellor of the University of Hertfordshire.

== Early life ==
Robert Michael James Gascoyne-Cecil was born on 30 September 1946, the eldest child and first-born son of Robert Gascoyne-Cecil, 6th Marquess of Salisbury. His younger brother was the journalist Lord Richard Cecil, who was killed covering the conflict in Rhodesia in 1978.

The Marquess of Salisbury attended Eton College and Christ Church, Oxford, and became a merchant banker before going to work on the family estates.

== Political career ==
=== House of Commons ===
Lord Cranborne was selected as the Conservative Party candidate for South Dorset in 1976, where his family owned land, despite there being on the shortlist several former members of parliament who had lost their seats in the two 1974 elections. At the 1978 Conservative Party conference he spoke in opposition to British sanctions against Rhodesia. He won the South Dorset seat at the 1979 general election, becoming the seventh consecutive generation of his family to sit in the House of Commons. In his maiden speech, he urged Ian Smith, prime minister of Rhodesia, to stand aside in favour of Abel Muzorewa.

Cranborne gained a general reputation as a right-winger, especially on matters affecting the Church of England, but confounded this reputation when he co-wrote a pamphlet in 1981 which said that the fight against unemployment ought to be given more priority than the fight against inflation. He took an interest in Northern Ireland, and, when Jim Prior announced his policy of 'Rolling Devolution', resigned an unpaid job as assistant to Douglas Hurd.

Lord Cranborne became known in the early 1980s as an anti-communist, as a supporter of Afghan refugees (from the Soviet invasion of that country) in Pakistan, and for sending food parcels to Poland. Until the early years of the 21st century, a charity shop was run on his Hatfield House estate solely to raise money for these causes, including funds for Polish orphanages. He was involved in efforts to fund the Afghan resistance. His strong opposition to any involvement by the Republic of Ireland in Northern Ireland led him to oppose the Anglo-Irish Agreement and contributed to his decision to retire from the House of Commons in 1987.

=== House of Lords ===
After the 1992 general election, John Major used a writ of acceleration to call Lord Cranborne up to the House of Lords in one of his father's junior titles. Thus, Lord Cranborne was summoned to Parliament as Baron Cecil, of Essendon in the County of Rutland (his father's most junior dignity), although he continued to be known by his courtesy style of Viscount Cranborne. This is the most recent time a writ of acceleration has been issued, and due to the provisions of the House of Lords Act 1999, abolishing the automatic right of hereditary peers to sit in the House of Lords, any future use of the writ of acceleration is highly unlikely.

He served for two years as a junior defence minister before being appointed as Lord Privy Seal and Leader of the House of Lords in 1994. Lord Cranborne was appointed by the Queen as Privy Counsellor (PC) on 21 July 1994. Funding for opposition parties in the House of Lords, known as Cranborne Money, began during his leadership. When Major resigned as Leader of the Conservative Party in an attempt to test his authority as leader in July 1995, Lord Cranborne led his re-election campaign. He was recognised as one of the few members of the Cabinet who were personally loyal to Major, but continued to lead the Conservative Peers after Labour won the 1997 general election.

When the new Prime Minister Tony Blair proposed the removal of the hereditary element in the House of Lords, Lord Cranborne negotiated a pact with the Labour government to retain a small number of hereditary peers (later set at 92) for what was intended to be an interim period. For the sake of form this amendment was formally proposed by Lord Weatherill, Convenor of the Cross-Bench Peers. However, Lord Cranborne gave his party's approval without consulting the party leader, William Hague, who knew nothing and was embarrassed when Blair told him of it in the House of Commons during Prime Minister's Questions. Hague then sacked Lord Cranborne, who accepted his error, saying that he had "rushed in, like an ill-trained spaniel".

All former Leaders of the House of Lords who were hereditary peers accepted life peerages to keep them in the upper house in 1999. Lord Cranborne, who had received the title Baron Gascoyne-Cecil, of Essendon in the County of Rutland, remained active on the backbenches until the House of Lords adopted new rules for declaration of financial interests which he believed were too onerous. He took "Leave of Absence" on 1 November 2001. He was therefore out of the House of Lords when he succeeded his father as the 7th Marquess of Salisbury on 11 July 2003.

In January 2010, Lord Salisbury and Owen Paterson, the Shadow Secretary of State for Northern Ireland, hosted secret talks at Hatfield House, involving the DUP, the UUP and the Conservative Party. These talks prompted speculation that the Conservatives were attempting to create a pan-unionist front to limit Sinn Féin and the Social Democratic and Labour Party at the 2010 general election.

In September 2012, Lord Salisbury, in his role as Chairman of the Thames Diamond Jubilee Foundation, was knighted by Queen Elizabeth II and became a Knight Commander of the Royal Victorian Order (KCVO).

He retired from the House of Lords on 8 June 2017, the date of the snap general election. He was appointed a Knight Companion of the Order of the Garter (KG) on 27 February 2019.

== Other interests ==
Salisbury is a Deputy Lieutenant of Hertfordshire, and the current president of the Friends of the British Library and of the Friends of Friendless Churches.

Lord Salisbury is the chairman of the Constitution Reform Group (CRG), a cross-party pressure group which seeks a new constitutional settlement in the UK by way of a new Act of Union. The group backed the Act of Union Bill 2017–19, introduced as a Private Member's Bill by Lord Lisvane in the House of Lords on 9 October 2018, when it received a formal first reading; its passage through Parliament was terminated by the ending of the parliamentary session in October 2019.

Lord Salisbury writes for The Spectator and the Centre for Policy Studies under the informal name of Robert Salisbury. He is the chairman of Reaction.

In 2020, Lord Salisbury published a book entitled William Simpson and the Crisis in Central Asia, 1884–5. It is a non-fiction book on the Victorian war artist William Simpson, and his involvement with the Afghan Boundary Commission, a surveying project which nearly triggered a war with Tsarist Russia in 1885. The book was privately published as a contribution to the Roxburghe Club, and is illustrated by a set of sketches by Simpson, now owned by Lord Salisbury.

Since 2022, Lord Salisbury is the chairman of the London Defence Conference, held in partnership with King's College London.

== Marriage and children ==
In 1970, aged 23, he married Hannah Anne Stirling, daughter of Bill Stirling of Keir, niece of Colonel Sir David Stirling (a co-founder of the SAS) and a descendant of the Lords Lovat, Scottish Catholic aristocrats. The marriage was initially opposed by his family, chiefly because Stirling was a Catholic.

During the 1970s, Lord and Lady Cranborne had two sons and three daughters (including twins); the two elder daughters are now married. Until recently, they lived at Cranborne Manor, Dorset. The family seat is Hatfield House, once home to Queen Elizabeth I of England, which was given to the family by James I of England in exchange for the Cecil family house Theobalds. The Cecils are landowners in Dorset, Hertfordshire and London, and the 7th Marquess ranked 352nd in the Sunday Times Rich List 2017, with an estimated net worth of £335m (of which the paintings at Hatfield accounted for £150m).

The Marquess of Salisbury's heir apparent is his elder son Robert Edward "Ned" William Gascoyne-Cecil, Viscount Cranborne (born 18 December 1970). He was a page of honour to Queen Elizabeth II from 1983 to 1986. The heir is unmarried, though he does have a daughter born in 2001. The younger son, Lord James, married Alexandra Issa and fathered one son, Thomas Richard James (born 2009).

Cecil family tree, including earls of Exeter and Salisbury (1605) and marquesses of Exeter (1801) and Salisbury

David Cecil c. 1460–c. 1540
Richard Cecil c. 1495–1553
Baron Burghley, 1571
William Cecil; 1520–1598; 1st Baron Burghley | Mildred Cooke; 1526–1589
Earl of Exeter, 1605 | Baron Cecil, 1603; Viscount Cranborne, 1604; Earl of Salisbury (5th creation), 1605
Thomas Cecil; 1542–1623; 1st Earl of Exeter, 2nd Baron Burghley | Robert Cecil; 1563–1612; 1st Earl of Salisbury, etc.
Viscount Wimbledon and Baron Cecil of Putney, 1625
William Cecil; 1566–1600; 2nd Earl of Exeter, 3rd Baron Burghley | Richard Cecil; 1570–1633 | Edward Cecil; 1572–1638; Viscount Wimbledon and Baron Cecil of Putney | Thomas Howard; 1561–1626; 1st Earl of Suffolk
Barony of Cecil of Putney and viscounty of Wimbledon extinct, 1638
David Cecil c. 1600–1643; 3rd Earl of Exeter, 4th Baron Burghley | William Cecil; 1591–1668; 2nd Earl of Salisbury, etc. | Catherine c. 1590–1673
John Cecil; 1628–1678; 4th Earl of Exeter, 5th Baron Burghley | Charles Cecil; 1619–1660 styled Viscount Cranborne | John Manners; 1604–1679; 8th Earl of Rutland
John Cecil c. 1648–1700; 5th Earl of Exeter, 6th Baron Burghley | James Cecil; 1648–1683; 3rd Earl of Salisbury, etc. | Margaret d. c. 1682
John Cecil; 1674–1721; 6th Earl of Exeter, 7th Baron Burghley | James Cecil; 1666–1694; 4th Earl of Salisbury, etc. | Thomas Tufton; 1644–1729; 6th Earl of Thanet
John Cecil c. 1700–1722; 7th Earl of Exeter, 8th Baron Burghley | Brownlow Cecil; 1701–1754; 8th Earl of Exeter, 9th Baron Burghley | James Cecil; 1691–1728; 5th Earl of Salisbury, etc. | Anne; 1693–1757
Brownlow Cecil; 1725–1793; 9th Earl of Exeter, 10th Baron Burghley | James Cecil; 1713–1780; 6th Earl of Salisbury, etc. | Wills Hill; 1718–1793; 1st Marquess of Downshire
Marquess of Exeter (2nd creation), 1801 | Marquess of Salisbury, 1789
Henry Cecil; 1754–1804; 1st Marquess of Exeter, 10th Earl of Exeter, 11th Baron Burghley | James Cecil; 1743–1823; 1st Marquess of Salisbury, 7th Earl of Salisbury, etc. | Emily; 1750–1835
Brownlow Cecil; 1795–1867; 2nd Marquess of Exeter, 11th Earl of Exeter, 12th Baron Burghley | James Brownlow William Gascoyne-Cecil; 1791–1868; 2nd Marquess of Salisbury, 8th Earl of Salisbury, etc.
William Allen Cecil; 1825–1895; 3rd Marquess of Exeter, 12th Earl of Exeter, 13th Baron Burghley | James Emilius William Evelyn Gascoyne-Cecil; 1821–1865 styled Viscount Cranborne | Robert Arthur Talbot Gascoyne-Cecil; 1830–1903; 3rd Marquess of Salisbury, 9th Earl of Salisbury, etc.
Viscount Cecil of Chelwood, 1923
Brownlow Henry George Cecil; 1849–1898; 4th Marquess of Exeter, 13th Earl of Exeter, 14th Baron Burghley | Mary Rothes Margaret Cecil; 1857–1919; 2nd Baroness Amherst of Hackney | William Cecil; 1854–1943 | James Edward Hubert Gascoyne-Cecil; 1861–1947; 4th Marquess of Salisbury, 10th Earl of Salisbury, etc. | Edgar Algernon Robert Gascoyne-Cecil; 1864–1958; Viscount Cecil of Chelwood
Viscounty of Cecil of Chelwood extinct, 1958
William Thomas Brownlow Cecil; 1876–1956; 5th Marquess of Exeter, 14th Earl of Exeter, 15th Baron Burghley | William Amherst Cecil; 1886–1914 | Robert Arthur James Gascoyne-Cecil; 1893–1972; 5th Marquess of Salisbury, 11th Earl of Salisbury, etc.
David George Brownlow Cecil; 1905–1981; 6th Marquess of Exeter, 15th Earl of Exeter, 16th Baron Burghley | William Martin Alleyne Cecil; 1909–1988; 7th Marquess of Exeter, 16th Earl of Exeter, 17th Baron Burghley | William Alexander Evering Cecil; 1912–1980; 3rd Baron Amherst of Hackney | Robert Edward Peter Gascoyne-Cecil; 1916–2003; 6th Marquess of Salisbury, 12th Earl of Salisbury, etc.
William Michael Anthony Cecil b. 1935; 8th Marquess of Exeter, 17th Earl of Exeter, 18th Baron Burghley | William Hugh Amherst Cecil; 1940–2009; 4th Baron Amherst of Hackney | Robert Edward Peter Gascoyne-Cecil b. 1946; 7th Marquess of Salisbury, 13th Earl of Salisbury, etc.
Anthony Cecil b. 1970 styled Lord Burghley; Exeter heir apparent | Hugh William Amherst Cecil b. 1968; 5th Baron Amherst of Hackney; 2nd in line to Exeter | Robert Edward "Ned" William Gascoyne-Cecil b. 1970 styled Viscount Cranborne; Salisbury heir apparent | James Richard Gascoyne-Cecil b. 1976; 2nd in line to Salisbury

== Arms ==
Coat of arms of Robert Gascoyne-Cecil, 7th Marquess of Salisbury
| Coronet Coronet of a Marquess Crest 1st, Six Arrows in saltire Or, barbed and flighted Argent, bound together with a Belt Gules, buckled and garnished Gold, over the arrows a Morion Cap proper (Cecil); 2nd, A Conger's Head erased and erect Or, charged with an Ermine Spot (Gascoyne) Escutcheon Quarterly, 1st and 4th, Barry of ten Argent and Azure, over all six Escutcheons Sable, three two and one each charged with a Lion rampant of the First, a Crescent Gules for difference(Cecil); 2nd and 3rd, Argent, on a Pale Sable, a Conger's Head erased and erect Or, charged with an Ermine Spot (Gascoyne) Supporters On either side a Lion Ermine Motto SERO SED SERIO (Late, but in earnest) Orders Order of the Garter circlet (appointed 27 February 2019), with the motto Honi soit qui mal y pense (Shame on him who thinks evil of it); Royal Victorian Order (appointed KCVO 2012) Banner The banner of arms used as a Garter banner at St George's Chapel |

Parliament of the United Kingdom
| Preceded by Evelyn King | Member of Parliament for South Dorset; 1979–1987 | Succeeded by Ian Bruce |
Peerage of England
| Preceded by Robert Gascoyne-Cecil | Baron Cecil by writ of acceleration 1992–present | Incumbent |
Peerage of Great Britain
| Preceded by Robert Gascoyne-Cecil | Marquess of Salisbury; 2003–present | Incumbent |
Political offices
| Preceded by The Lord Wakeham | Leader of the House of Lords; 1994–1997 | Succeeded by The Lord Richard |
| Preceded by The Lord Wakeham | Lord Privy Seal; 1994–1997 | Succeeded by The Lord Richard |
| Preceded by The Lord Richard | Leader of the Opposition in the House of Lords; 1997–1998 | Succeeded by The Lord Strathclyde |
Party political offices
| Preceded by The Lord Wakeham | Leader of the Conservative Party in the House of Lords; 1994–1998 | Succeeded by The Lord Strathclyde |
Academic offices
| Preceded by The Lord MacLaurin of Knebworth | Chancellor of the University of Hertfordshire; 2005–2025 | Succeeded by Grace Ononiwu |
Orders of precedence in the United Kingdom
| Preceded by The Marquess Townshend | Gentlemen | Succeeded by The Marquess of Bath |
