= Africa Illustrious Award =

African award show

- Awarded for: Recognizing individuals who have excelled in leadership, philanthropy, community development, business, academia, education, agriculture, among others
- Country: Nigeria
- Presented by: My Media Africa
- First award: 2020
- Website: africaillustriousawards.org

Africa Illustrious Award is presented both annually and quarterly to recognize Africans who have excelled in leadership, philanthropy, community development, business, academia, education, agriculture, among others.

== History ==
The first edition of Africa Illustrious Award was held on 16 December 2020 at Radisson Blu Hotel, Victoria Island, Lagos, Nigeria. The award is organized by My Media Africa.

== Awards ==
The award is an annual and quarterly event. The annual event recognizes individuals who have excelled in leadership, philanthropy, community development, arts, culture and business, while the quarterly event recognizes individuals who have made contributions in service industries and academia.

== 2020 recipients ==
The 2020 Africa Illustrious Award took place on 16 December 2020 at Radisson Blu Hotel, Victoria Island, Lagos, Nigeria. It has thirty-five categories.

Category	Recipients
African Peace Ambassador of all Time	Goodluck Jonathan
Children's Right and Child Protection Advocate of the Year	Abiye Tam-George
Media Personality of the Year	Bisi Olatilo
Bank of the Year	Guaranty Trust Bank
Brand of the Year	New Crystal Communication
African Philanthropist of the Year	Allen Onyema
Businesswoman of the Year	Ehi Ogbebor
Nigeria Educationist of all Time	Jibril Aminu
Minister of the Year	Uchechukwu Sampson Ogah
Senator of the Year	Uche Ekwunife
Best Governor of the Year	Babagana Umara Zulum
Industrialist of the Year	Innocent Chukwuma
Female Philanthropist of the Year	Nkoli Imoh
Award for Services to the Nation and Philanthropic Contributions to Humanity	Sani Abdullahi Shinkafi
The Most Vocal Legislator of the Year	Abinye Blessing Pepple
Sports Administrator of the Year	Aisha Falode
Award for an Outstanding Leadership in the Financial Sector	Sam Okojere
Special Recognition for Dedicated service to the Nation	Aderemi Adeoye
Executive Coach and Leadership Development Trainer of the Year	Patricia Omoqui
Legislator of the Year	Aniekan Umanah
Most Innovative Startup of the Year	Twiga Foods Kenya
Role Model Entrepreneur of the Year	Kevin Okyere
Microfinance Bank of the Year	Chevron Employee Microfinance Bank
Award in Education Development for Africa	Prince Abiodun Agbaje
Award on Entrepreneurship and Agricultural Development in Africa	Nnaemeka Obiaraeri
Vocal Patriotic Citizen of the Year	Femi Fani-Kayode
Businessman of the Year	Ernest Azudialu Obiejesi
Outstanding Excellence Award for Services to the Nation and Philanthropic Activities to Humanity for the Year	John Ogu
Young Talent of the Year	Prince Angel Nwabube
Travel Company of the Year	Zidora Travels
Award for International Business and Bilateral Relationship	Eze Ibejiuba
Business Innovation and Philanthropic Contributions	Victor Usunogun Osazuwa
Award for Philanthropic Contributions and Youth Support in Africa	Onyekachi Okonkwo
Award of Excellence and Special Recognition	Ihekwo Arinze Christian
Outstanding Performance Award for Proactive Entertainment and Investment Development in Africa	Benjamin Nwokorie
