= Spindrella Kelly =

Nigerian businesswoman

Spindrella Anaekpeluchi Kelly
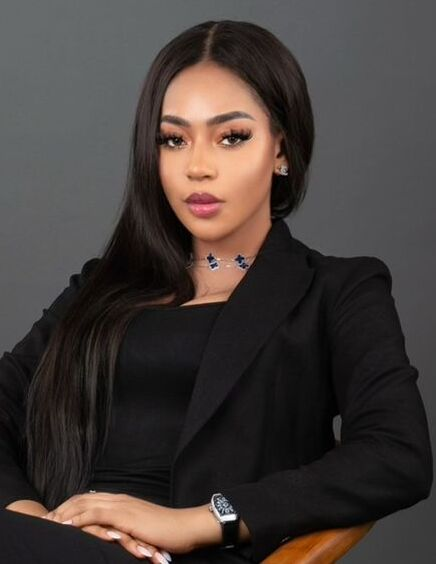
- Born: Spindrella Kelly; February 24, 1996 (age 30); United Kingdom
- Education: University of Hertfordshire, Excelsior University (US), Prowess University (US)
- Occupation: Entrepreneur
- Known for: Entrepreneurship, influencing, acting and activism

Spindrella Anaekpeluchi Kelly (born 24 February 1996) is a Nigerian businesswoman and entrepreneur. She is the founder and CEO of Kardashev Technologies Ltd.

According to Daily Times (Nigeria), she was publicly recognized by former president Olusegun Obasanjo for her community development work commissioned under his leadership. In 2022, she won the Choice Philanthropist of the Year award at the Nigerian Teens Choice Awards. In 2025, she was listed as an awardee of the prestigious Africa Illustrious Award.

== Early life ==
She hails from Igbariam in the Okalakwu, Anambra State, Nigeria. She attended Olsis Primary School and Pine Crest secondary school before proceeding to the University of Hertfordshire in the United Kingdom to pursue her degree course in technology and computers. She has also obtained PhD in Science from Prowess University in Delaware.

== Career ==
Kelly is the founder and CEO of Kardashev Technologies Ltd, the creator of the Shaded Goddess luxury eyewear brand, and the founder of Kard Tech Luxury. She has also been involved in renewable energy projects, modular housing, and fashion consulting. In 2020, she founded Exclusive Styling, a consultancy that styled celebrities for Nigerian television shows, including Big Brother Naija.

She has been named among Africa's 20 New Wealth Creators, and 30 Under 30, nominated for The Future Awards Africa Prize for Young Person of the Year, and listed by Management Today in their 35 Women Under 35 to Watch. The U.S. Embassy in London has also described her as a “global leader”. Kelly advocates for women in technology and STEM and has reported influencing more than 30,000 young Africans through her mentorship programs. She also promotes ethical sourcing and slow fashion in her business ventures.

In 2025, she won the Africa Illustrious Award. She championed the principles of slow fashion and ethical sourcing. In 2020, she founded a consultancy, Exclusive Styling, and they styled celebrities for TV shows including Nigerian Big Brother. In 2025 she was named in the Under 40 CEOs Awards 2025 and the 100 Iconic Personalities of the Year 2025.
