= Iain Martin =

Scottish political commentator, author and public speaker

- Born: Iain James Martin; 2 October 1971 (age 55); Paisley, Renfrewshire, Scotland
- Education: University of Glasgow
- Occupations: Director of the London Defence Conference and Director of Engelsberg Ideas

Iain James Martin (born 2 October 1971) is a British journalist, broadcaster and author who wrote a weekly column for The Times from 2016 to 2025. He is co-founder, editor and publisher of Reaction.life, a news site providing analysis and opinion on politics, economics and culture. He is a former editor of The Scotsman and Scotland on Sunday, and an author of books on the financial crisis and the City of London.

Martin is director of the London Defence Conference, an annual geopolitical gathering held since 2022 at King's College London every May.

Martin founded Engelsberg Ideas, the international publishing arm of the Axel and Margaret Ax:son Johnson Foundation, based in Sweden.

== Life and career ==
Martin was born in Paisley, and is a graduate of Glasgow University. He started in journalism as a reporter for the Sunday Times Scotland (1993–97), before becoming political editor of Scotland on Sunday (1997–2000), political editor of The Scotsman (2000–01), deputy editor of Scotland on Sunday (2001), and editor of The Scotsman (2001–04). He was editor of Scotland on Sunday (2004–06), deputy editor of the Sunday Telegraph (2006), and head of comment for the Telegraph Media Group (2008–09).

From 2009 to 2011 he was Deputy Editor of the Wall Street Journal Europe, for which he wrote a blog on politics. He moved to the Daily Mail newspaper in 2011 for a short time to write a weekly political column. He was a co-founder and editor of CapX, the site launched by the London-based Centre for Policy Studies in 2014.

In 2016 he founded Reaction.life, a site providing coverage of politics, economics and culture, where he publishes his weekly newsletter.

In 2022, in the wake of the Russian full-scale invasion of Ukraine, he founded the London Defence Conference following the Defence of Europe event hosted at King’s College London. In 2023 the inaugural London Defence Conference featured Prime Minister Rishi Sunak. In 2025, the third London Defence Conference was opened by Prime Minister Sir Keir Starmer.

His book Making it Happen: Fred Goodwin, RBS and the Men Who Blew Up the British Economy, on the 2008 financial crisis, was published in 2013 by Simon & Schuster.

Crash, Bang, Wallop: the inside story of London's Big Bang and a financial revolution that changed the world, was published by Sceptre in September 2016.

== Works ==
- Martin, Iain (2013). Making it Happen: Fred Goodwin, RBS and the Men Who Blew Up the British Economy. New York: Simon & Schuster. ISBN 978-1471113543.
- Martin, Iain (2016). Crash Bang Wallop: The Inside Story of London's Big Bang and a Financial Revolution that Changed the World. London: Sceptre. ISBN 978-1473625068.

== Awards and honours ==
- 2013 Financial Times and Goldman Sachs Business Book of the Year Award, shortlisted for Making it Happen
