= Quintin McKellar =

Scottish veterinarian and academic

Vice-Chancellor of the University of Hertfordshire
- Incumbent
- Assumed office 1 January 2011

Personal details
- Education: University of Glasgow
- Salary: £333,000 (2021–22)

Quintin Archibald McKellar CBE FRSE FRSB FRCVS is a British veterinary surgeon and academic. In the 2011 New Year Honours list, he was appointed a CBE for services to science during his tenure as principal of the Royal Veterinary College. Since January 2011 he has been vice-chancellor of the University of Hertfordshire.

== Early life and education ==
McKellar grew up in Renfrewshire, Scotland, and graduated from the University of Glasgow School of Veterinary Medicine in 1981. Upon graduating, he remained at Glasgow so that he could continue to train there as a member of the university's rowing club, and he gained a PhD in veterinary parasitology in 1984.

McKellar represented Scotland as a rower at the 1986 Commonwealth Games, finishing fifth in two events, the eight and the coxless four.

== Career ==
After obtaining his PhD in the study of Ostertagia ostertagi, a parasite of cattle, McKellar remained at Glagow University in the department of pharmacology, researching anthelmintics, and became head of the department in 1988. In 1996, Glasgow awarded McKellar a personal professorship. McKellar remained Professor of Veterinary Parasitology at Glasgow until 1997, when he became Scientific Director and Chief Executive of the Moredun Research Institute, a post which he held until the end of 2003. From 2004 until the end of 2010, he was principal of the Royal Veterinary College of the University of London. In January 2011, McKellar became vice-chancellor of the University of Hertfordshire, succeeding Tim Wilson.

In 2015 he was elected as a board member of Universities UK and is chair of the University Vocational Awards Council.

He is chair of the board of trustees of the Pirbright Institute, and co-chair of the National Centre for Universities and Business (NCUB) Food Economy Task Force. a member of the Hertfordshire Local Enterprise Partnership, and chair of the Hatfield Renewal Project Board. and was a member of the Government Chief Scientist Steering Group on Animal and Plant Health in the UK.

=== Fellowships ===
- 2001 Fellowship of the Institute of Biology
- 2002 Fellowship of the Royal Agricultural Societies
- 2003 Fellowship of the Royal Society of Edinburgh
- 2009 Fellowship of the Royal Society for the Encouragement of Arts, Manufactures and Commerce
- 2016 Fellowship of the Royal College of Veterinary Surgeons

=== Academic awards ===
- Pfizer Academic Award for Animal Health Research 1986
- The Wellcome Trust Medal for Veterinary Research 1993
- British Small Animal Veterinary Association Amoroso Award 1995
- Royal Agricultural Society Bledisloe Award 2000
- Saltire Society Scottish Science Award 2001
- British Veterinary Association Wooldrich Award 2002

== Public lectures ==
- Therapy for Livestock in a Global Community, Elixir or Crutch. Saltire Society Science Award. Royal Society of Edinburgh 2001.
- Pride and Prejudice. The Wooldrich Lecture, British Veterinary Association, Stratford, 2002.
- The Future of Animal Welfare. Royal Philosophical Society of Glasgow, Glasgow 2003.
- How can milk cost less than water? Royal Society of Arts Annual President's Lecture, London 2009.

== Notable publications ==
- McKellar, Quintin A.; Lees, Peter; Gettinby, George (3 March 1994). "Pharmacodynamics of tolfenamic acid in dogs. Evaluation of dose response relationships". European Journal of Pharmacology. 253 (3): 191–200. doi:10.1016/0014-2999(94)90191-0. PMID 8200415.
- Benchaoui, HA; McKellar, QA (July 1996). "Interaction between fenbendazole and piperonyl butoxide: pharmacokinetic and pharmacodynamic implications". Journal of Pharmacy and Pharmacology. 48 (7): 753–9. doi:10.1111/j.2042-7158.1996.tb03965.x. PMID 8866343. S2CID 22599099.
- McKellar, Quintin; Gibson, Ian; Monteiro, Ana; Bregante, Miguel (August 1999). "Pharmacokinetics of enrofloxacin and danofloxacin in plasma, inflammatory exudate, and bronchial secretions of calves following subcutaneous administration". Antimicrobial Agents and Chemotherapy. 43 (8): 1988–1992. doi:10.1128/AAC.43.8.1988. PMC 89402. PMID 10428924.
- Cheng, Zhangrui; Nolan, Andrea; McKellar, Quintin A. (June 2002). "Anti-inflammatory effects of carprofen, carprofen enantiomers, and N^{G}-nitro-L-arginine methyl ester in sheep". American Journal of Veterinary Research. 63 (6): 782–8. doi:10.2460/ajvr.2002.63.782. PMID 12061520.
- McKellar, QA; Gokbulut, C; Muzandu, K; Benchaoui, H (November 2002). "Fenbendazole pharmacokinetics, metabolism, and potentiation in horses". Drug Metabolism and Disposition. 30 (11): 1230–1239. doi:10.1124/dmd.30.11.1230. PMID 12386129. S2CID 6310030.
- Sarasola, Patxi; Lees, Peter; AliAbadi, Fariborz Shojaee; McKellar, Quintin A.; Donachie, William; Marr, Kate A.; Sunderland, Simon J.; Rowan, Tim G. (September 2002). "Pharmacokinetic and pharmacodynamic profiles of danofloxacin administered by two dosing regimens in calves infected with Mannheimia (Pasteurella) haemolytica". Antimicrobial Agents and Chemotherapy. 46 (9): 3013–9. doi:10.1128/AAC.46.9.3013-3019.2002. PMC 127430. PMID 12183261.
- Mitchell, John D.; McKellar, Quintin A.; McKeever, Declan J. (2012). "Pharmacodynamics of antimicrobials against Mycoplasma mycoides mycoides small colony, the causative agent of contagious bovine pleuropneumonia". PLOS One. 7 (8) e44158. Bibcode:2012PLoSO...744158M. doi:10.1371/journal.pone.0044158. PMC 3428318. PMID 22952911.
- Mitchell, John D.; McKellar, Quintin A.; McKeever, Declan J. (January 2013). "Evaluation of antimicrobial activity against Mycoplasma mycoides subsp. mycoides Small Colony using an in vitro dynamic dilution pharmacokinetic/pharmacodynamic model". Journal of Medical Microbiology. 62 (Pt 1): 56–61. doi:10.1099/jmm.0.045971-0. PMID 23002064.
