= CapX =

British online newspaper and news aggregator

- Website type: Online newspaper News aggregator
- Available in: English
- Headquarters: Westminster, London, {{{location_country}}}
- Key people: Robert Colvile (editor-in-chief); Marc Sidwell (editor)
- Parent: Centre for Policy Studies
- Website: capx.co
- Launched: 21 June 2014; 12 years ago
- Current status: Active

CapX is a centre-right British online newspaper and news aggregator. It was founded by the Centre for Policy Studies, and features columnists and contributors such as Tim Montgomerie, Daniel Hannan, and V. S. Naipaul. The site offers original content and aggregated news and blogs, and features opinion on politics, economics, and business issues.

CapX was launched on 21 June 2014 as a commentary outlet to promote "democratic capitalism" and support innovation, competition, free trade, good governance and liberty. It aggregates and selects news from 3.5 million blogs, academic journals and mainstream media. It publishes a spectrum of pro-market authors.

== History ==
CapX was founded by the Centre for Policy Studies (CPS) on 21 June 2014 in collaboration with Signal Media. On 28 January 2015, a new site was launched for CapX. CPS chairman Lord Saatchi commented on its launch, "CapX, the first global digital think tank, has been designed to show how popular capitalism can work to the benefit of all. We hope it will make a difference."

== Contributors ==
In addition to columns by Iain Martin and a group of contributors such as Tim Montgomerie, Daniel Hannan, Philippe Legrain, and Paul Collier, CapX has many authors—from politicians and campaigners to academics and policy experts—who contribute on a wide range of topics. Specialist contributors include Indian economist Deepak Lal, and Islamic economics specialist Benedikt Koehler.

== Political views ==
CapX is broadly on the centre-right of the political spectrum. In 2015, then-editor Iain Martin stated that CapX is "for competition because it drives innovation, creates wealth and increases prosperity." CapX supports innovation, competition, free trade, facilitative government and liberty, and is opposed to cronyism, corporatism and restrictive markets. Conservative Party politician Paul Goodman wrote on the political website ConservativeHome in October 2014, recommending that readers should add CapX to their reading list.

== Funding ==
The Centre for Policy Studies has received funding for the project from the Templeton Religion Trust and the Rising Tide Foundation.
