= John Gearson =

Defence and security academic

John Philip Steven Gearson (born March 1963) is professor of national security studies in the Department of War Studies at King's College London.

Gearson gave evidence for the National Security Strategy and Strategic Defence and Security Review 2015 in Parliament.

== Selected publications ==
- "Deterring conventional terrorism: From punishment to denial and resilience". Contemporary Security Policy. 33, 1, 2012, pp. 171–198.
- The Duty of Care in Insecure Environments: Guidelines for corporate security professionals. Centre for Defence Studies, King's College London, 2011.
- The HERO Review: Harnessing Efficiencies, Rethinking Outcomes: The Future of the Defence Estate. Centre for Defence Studies, King's College London, 2011.
- "Security, Not Defence, Strategic, Not Habit: Restructuring the Political Arrangements for Policy Making on Britain's Role in the World". With J. Gow. Political Quarterly, 81, 3, 2010, pp. 406–419.
- Defence White Paper 2003: Fifth Report of Session 2003-04. 2004.
- Lessons of Iraq. 2004.
- A New Chapter to the Strategic Defence Review. 2003.
- "Terrorist Targeting of Financial Centres: the IRA's CIty of London Campaign". Crime at Work Three. Gill, M. (ed.). Leicester: Perpetuity Press, 2003.
- "Britain and the Berlin Wall Crisis, 1958-62". The Berlin Wall Crisis: Perspectives on Cold War Alliances. Gearson, J. & Schake, K. (eds.). Palgrave Macmillan, 2002, pp. 43–72.
