= Grace Ononiwu =

British solicitor

Dr Grace Ononiwu CBE
- Education: Bachelor of Law and Social Sciences, 1988
- Alma mater: University of Hertfordshire, Guildford College of Law
- Occupations: Solicitor and Chief Prosecutor
- Employer: Crown Prosecution Service
- Honours: Honorary Doctorate from University of Hertfordshire

Grace Chidozie Ononiwu CBE is a solicitor and Director General of Legal Delivery at the Crown Prosecution Service (CPS) in the UK. Since November 2025, she has been Chancellor of the University of Hertfordshire.

== Life ==
Ononiwu was born to Nigerian parents and grew up in East London. She was a teenager when she decided to go into law.

Ononiwu qualified as a solicitor in 1991 and joined the Crown Prosecution Service. She became Chief Crown Prosecutor for Northamptonshire in April 2005 and Legal Director for North Region, CPS London, before becoming Deputy Chief Crown Prosecutor for all the London Districts. She became Chief Crown Prosecutor for the West Midlands in 2014.

She was Chair of the National Black Crown Prosecution Association and was awarded a Black Solicitors Network Lifetime Achievement honor. She was appointed an OBE in 2008 and CBE in 2019 for her services to law and order. She is a visiting professor at the University of Hertfordshire and has been awarded honorary doctorates from Hertfordshire and Birmingham City universities. A building at Hertfordshire University was named in her honour in 2022.

Ononiwu has been featured in the Power list of the UK's most influential men and women of African, African Caribbean and African-American heritage and was one of their Women of the Year 2020.

She was appointed as Director General of Legal Services and took up post on Monday 9 June 2025.
