= Allen Onyema =

Nigerian lawyer and entrepreneur (born 1964)

Allen Ifechukwu Onyema CON
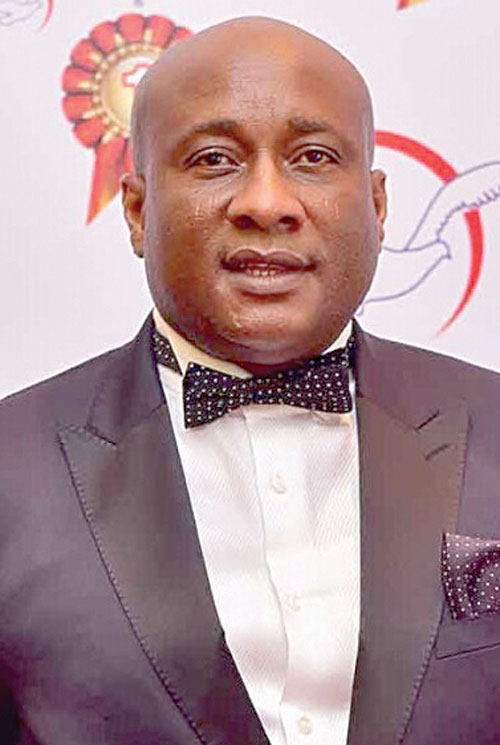
- Born: March 28, 1964 (age 62); Benin City, Edo State, Nigeria
- Other name: Ide Mbosi
- Education: University of Ibadan; Nigerian Law School
- Occupations: Lawyer, entrepreneur
- Years active: 1990–present
- Organization: Air Peace
- Known for: Founding Air Peace in 2014; Peace advocacy in Niger Delta
- Title: Chairman & CEO, Air Peace Limited
- Spouse: Alice Ojochida Onyema née Ejembi
- Children: 4
- Parent(s): Michael Onyema; Helen Onyema
- Awards: Vanguard Personality of the Year 2023; Commander of the Order of the Niger CON; Martin Luther King Jr. Global Award of Excellence

Allen Ifechukwu Onyema (// CON; born 1964) is a Nigerian lawyer and entrepreneur. He is the CEO of Air Peace Limited, which was established in 2014.

== Early life and education ==
He was born in March 1968 in Benin City to Michael and Helen Onyema as the first of nine children. He hails from Mbosi in Ihiala Local Government Area Anambra State, Nigeria.

Allen studied law at the University of Ibadan and graduated in 1987. He attended the Nigerian Law School and was called to Bar in 1989.

== Indictment ==
In 2019, the US Department of Justice issued an indictment against Allen Onyema, on the grounds of money laundering and bank fraud. Onyema was accused of falsifying documents used for the purchase of airplanes for Air Peace and using those to fund purchases of luxury cars and high-end shopping. Onyema denies these allegations.

In October 2022, his alleged co-conspirator pleaded guilty and was sentenced to a fine and 3 years probation. Onyema and the Chief Financial Officer of Air Peace remain charged with 36 counts of criminality.

In October 2024, Onyema was additionally charged with two counts of obstructing justice and conspiracy to obstruct justice, due to his alleged falsification of documents used in his defense against the original charges.

== Personal life ==
Onyema married his wife, Alice Ojochida Onyema (née Ejembi) from the Igala tribe of Kogi State, in 1993, and together they have four children.
