= HICESC =

Hertfordshire Intensive Care & Emergency Simulation Centre (HICESC) is an advanced teaching facility based at the University of Hertfordshire. At its creation in 1998, it was an inter-Faculty practical laboratory hosted by the Department of Electronic, Communication and Electrical Engineering (ECEE) for access by medical engineering students and jointly established by the Department of Nursing and Paramedic Sciences, Faculty of Health and Human Sciences for use by their students.

The development of this centre has heavily been influenced by a project grant received from the British Heart Foundation, which effectively started in 2000 with the appointment of a "BHF project co-ordinator" and finished in 2003. The project conducted was to investigate the effectiveness of scenario-based simulation training with undergraduate nursing students using Objective Structured Clinical Examinations (OSCE).

== Second developmental phase ==
In 2004, due to some programme restructuration with the Department of ECEE, the centre was relocated within another part of the Faculty of Engineering and Information Sciences, which used to be a Department of Computer Science laboratory, with shared access to an adjacent room which could be used as a remote observation room. From that point on, HICESC became a central Faculty of Health & Human Sciences resource without formal link to ECEE. The new setup made the centre more appropriate for high-fidelity scenario-based simulation training and enabled collaboration with the local NHS Trusts for the training of their Foundation Doctors, then called Pre-registration House Officers.

== Third developmental phase ==
End of 2006, HICESC became the centre piece of a new 4-storey building project on the College Lane campus to create the largest UK high-fidelity simulation centre, and one of the largest in Europe. The ground floor of the new Health Research Building now provides a world leading multiprofessional simulation teaching environment. Students who access the facilities for uniprofessional as well as multiprofessional scenario-based simulation training are from a range of disciplines such as various specialties of nursing, midwifery, paramedic sciences, pharmacy, pharmacology, physiotherapy, radiography, and clinical psychology. To that effect the centre has benefitted from several educational research grants such as from the Higher Education Academy Health Sciences and Practice Subject Centre. Other key professional groups include Foundation Doctors from diverse local NHS Trusts, Physician Assistants, Critical Care Practitioners, Emergency Care Practitioners, and Anaesthesia Practitioners.

The new HICESC consists of:

- Adult and Paediatric ITU/Ward Simulation area
- Simulated community / hospital pharmacy with an automated dispensing robot, and counselling cubicle
- Screen-based/Clinical skills lab with patient assessment area as found in a GP surgery
- 3 Observation / seminar rooms
- 2 control rooms
- State-of-the-art adult and paediatric manikins from Laerdal Medical
- State-of-the-art audio visual equipment by Scotia UK Ltd
- Conference facilities

as can be seen on the following floorplan:

== Most recent developments ==
Since its relocation in the purpose built facilities, HICESC has hosted two simulation conferences. The Joint Meeting of the National Association of Medical Simulators (NAMS) and the Clinical Skills Network (CSN) in September 2007 and in June 2008, the 14th Annual Meeting of the Society in Europe for Simulation Applied to Medicine (SESAM).

In September 2009, HICESC merged with the University of Hertfordshire's Postgraduate Medical School, while still keeping its Faculty wide remit to facilitate simulation-based learning to all healthcare students.
