= Kevin Okyere =

Ghanaian entrepreneur

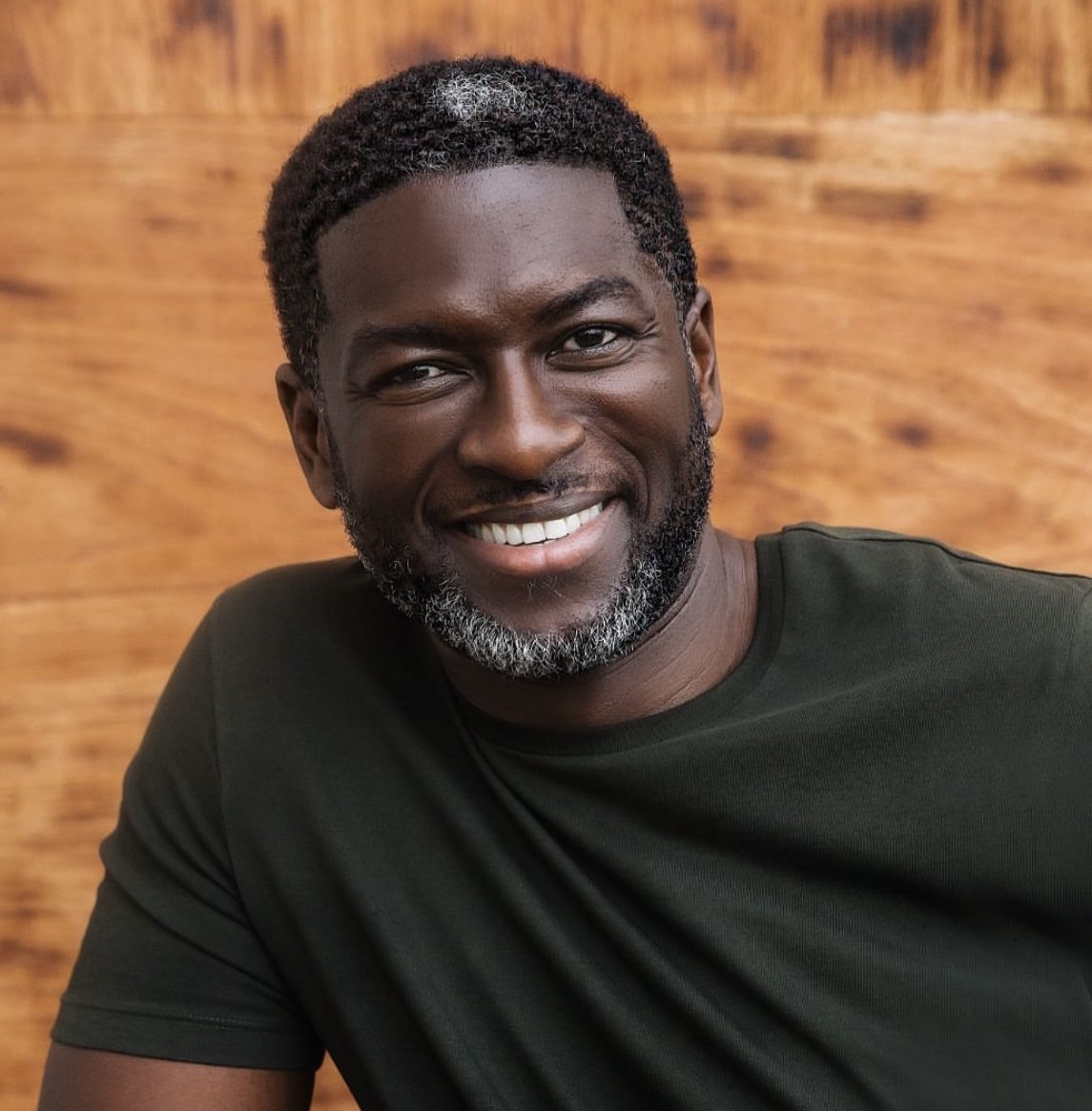
Kevin Okyere is founder of Springfield Energy

Kevin Okyere is a Ghanaian entrepreneur in the oil industry. He serves as the Founder and CEO of Springfield Energy- a billion-dollar oil company. The company was founded in 2008.

== Early life and education ==
He was born in 1980 to an affluent Ashanti family in Ghana. Okyere completed high school in Ghana and went on to study Accounting at the George Mason University in Virginia in the United States.

== Career ==
=== Springfield ===
Kevin's company, Springfield, was given the block, known as West Cape Three Points Block 2, by Ghana's government in 2016 after it was relinquished by Kosmos. Also, the company is the leader in exporting refined products to land-lock neighbouring countries such as Mali and Burkina Faso and Nigerian crude. In 2019, Springfield Exploration and Production Limited (SEP) became the first indigenous Ghanaian company to drill in deep water. The company secured a contract with Stena Unicon Offshore Services Ghana Ltd, a subsidiary of Stena Drilling, to deploy the Stena Forth Mobile Offshore Drilling Unit (MODU) for exploration in West Cape Three Points Block 2 (WCTP Block 2). At the time, Reuters reported that the Ghanaian government has been experiencing setbacks because of difficulties in offshore development in petroleum and, and that the discovery of around 1.5 billion barrels of offshore oil by Okyere's company was a potential game changer. Five years later, drilling commenced at the Oak-1x well and Afina-1x well, marking a significant milestone in Ghana's oil and gas industry.

== Arrest ==
In November 2025, reports from Dubai confirmed that Okyere had been detained in Dubai in connection with a commercial dispute involving a Swiss oil trading company and allegations of financial impropriety linked to oil transactions. According to the reports, Dubai authorities allegedly flagged his passport upon arrival due to an arbitration and criminal enforcement matter.

Okyere obtained a court injunction prohibiting further publication on the dispute while his defamation case was pending. In June 2026, the High Court found that Larry Dogbey, editor of The Herald, had breached the injunction by continuing to publish on the matter, and sentenced him to seven days' imprisonment for contempt of court.

== Philanthropy ==
Okyere is a philanthropist whose foundation, the Kevin Okyere Foundation, works alongside the Springfield Group to support education and healthcare initiatives in Ghana. The foundation works with hospitals to help cover medical expenses for patients unable to afford treatment. It also funds school fees for primary school students and provides scholarships for Ghanaian students to study at universities in North America and Europe.

== Awards and recognition ==
In 2019, Kevin Okyere received two notable awards for his contributions to the oil and gas industry. He was honored with the Entrepreneurship Award (Impact to Business Award) by Face2Face Africa, a New York-based Pan-African organization, at a ceremony held in the United States on July 20. Earlier that year, he was named Man of the Year – Oil and Gas at the Exclusive Men of the Year (EMY) Africa Awards in Accra, recognizing his role in advancing the upstream sector in Ghana and Africa.
