= Reaction.life =

Website

Reaction
- Website type: News/commentary
- Available in: English
- Founded: June, 2016
- Headquarters: Westminster, London, United Kingdom
- Founders: Iain Martin, Susan E. Walton, Sebastian Giraud
- Chairperson: Robert Gascoyne-Cecil, 7th Marquess of Salisbury
- Website: www.reaction.life
- Launched: June 2016
- Current status: Active

Reaction.life is a British news website that features reporting and analysis on politics, economics, culture and ideas.

Reaction is based in London and edited by former Scotsman, Telegraph and Wall Street Journal executive Iain Martin, who is also a columnist for The Times and The Conservative. In July 2016 former conservative MP Robert Gascoyne-Cecil, 7th Marquess of Salisbury joined the board as chairman. Mark Fox is deputy chairman.

== Notable stories ==
On 30 June 2016, Boris Johnson withdrew from the Conservative Party leadership election, Iain Martin published an account of the run up to the unexpected announcement that day describing it as a "cuckoo in the nest" plot by Michael Gove.

During the leadership election, Reaction published an article by a former colleague of Andrea Leadsom, Robert Stephens, alleging that she had misstated the extent of her roles in the financial sector. This was the first of a series of revelations that lead to Leadsom withdrawing from the contest to become leader of the Conservative Party and UK Prime Minister.

== Columnists ==
Regular writers and columnists for Reaction.life include:

- Adam Boulton, Editor-at-large of Sky News
- Alastair Benn, Deputy Editor of Reaction.life
- Alice Crossley, Features Editor of Reaction.life
- Andrew Lilico, The Telegraph columnist
- Anthony Peters, strategy consultant and financial writer
- Caitlin Allen, journalist
- Chris Blackhurst, former Editor of The Independent
- Dominic Frisby, comedian, financial writer and voice actor
- Gabriel Gavin, journalist and writer
- Iain Dale, broadcaster and commentator
- Maggie Pagano, Executive Editor of Reaction.life
- Mattie Brignall, News Editor of Reaction.life
- Mutaz Ahmed, Telegraph reporter
- Oliver Rhodes, Online Editor of Reaction.life
- Olivia Utley, Telegraph Assistant Comment Editor
- Rachel Cunliffe, New Statesman Deputy Online Editor
- Robert Fox, Defence journalist
- Gerald Warner, conservative commentator
