= Learning Resource Centre =

Type of library

Learning Resource Centre (LRC) is a term which is used primarily in the United Kingdom to describe a type of library that exists within an educational setting such as a secondary school or university, distinguishable from a typical school library by an additional focus on multimedia resources and information technology. LRC can also stand for Library Resource Centre and in some cases Learning Resource Centre has been shortened to Learning Centre.

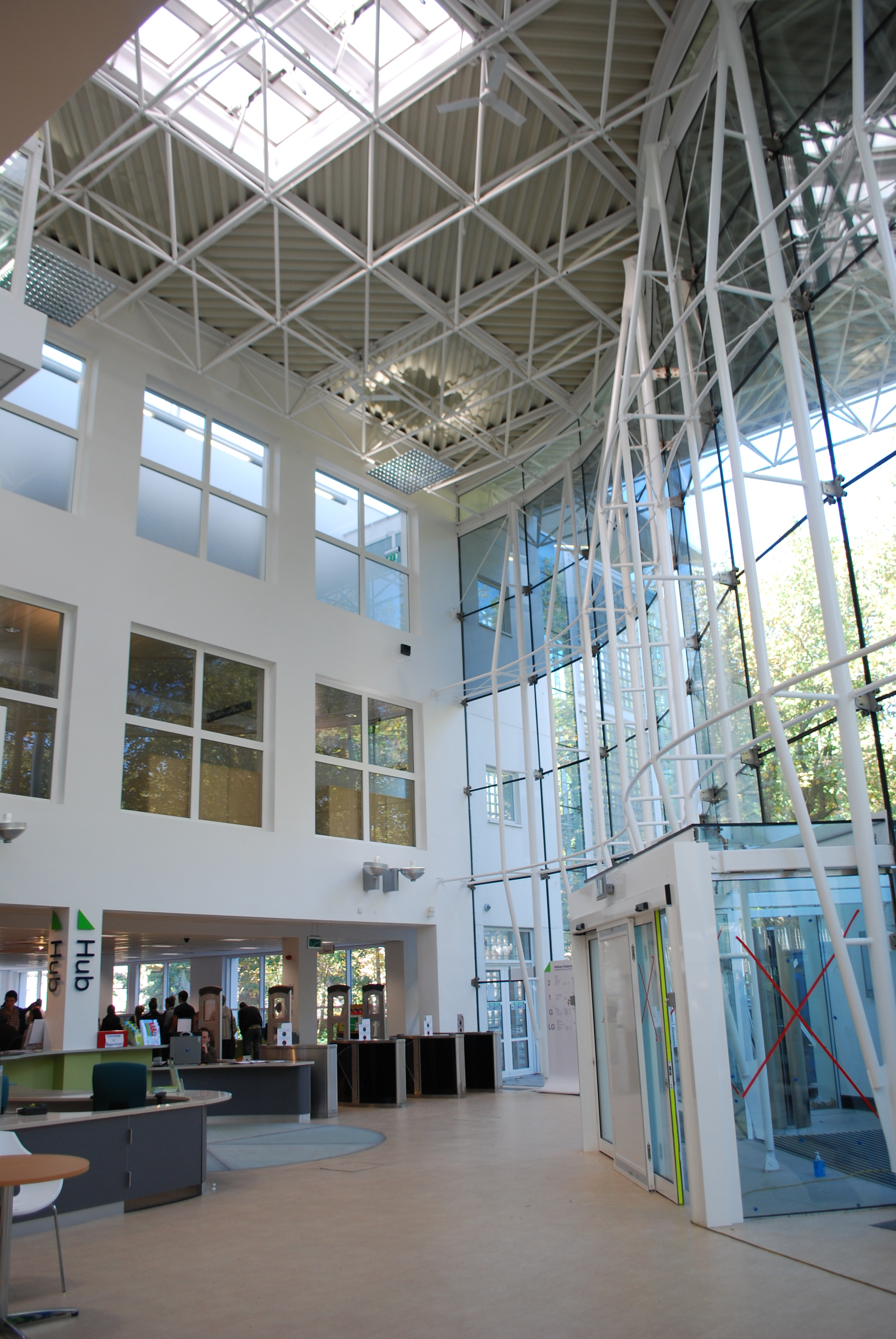
Liverpool John Moores University Aldham Robarts LRC

== Overview ==
These centres contain traditional educational resources such as books, journals, software and audio/visual materials, but they also exist to promote electronic information resources. Examples of these are subscription electronic journals, databases, free websites and other web based resources. The traditional librarian role has been replaced with the LRC Manager who is an information professional with qualifications recognised by the Chartered Institute of Library and Information Professionals. As well as managing the physical environment of the LRC, the LRC Manager is usually involved in editing LRC web pages and making contributions to the virtual learning environment, in order to provide access to quality and timely resources to colleagues and students. A key aspect of a Learning Resource Centre is the application of self study in a variety of different ways. They usually include computers, places to study and often private rooms.

LRCs usually have a responsibility for the teaching of information literacy and/or study skills within the institution they are in. Although this role is firmly established in further and higher education, it has only become a serious responsibility for the Secondary School LRC since the publication of "Key Stage 3 National Strategy" in 2003. The schools inspectorate OfSTED have also made this a key area for school LRCs to evaluate themselves on in their self-evaluation document for LRCs in 2003.

== See also ==
- Hybrid library
- History of libraries
