= Emissaries of Divine Light =

New religious movement

Emissaries of Divine Light is an intentional community initiated by Lloyd Arthur Meeker in 1932. The foundational premise of the network is that human beings' true qualities can only be known as they are expressed in practical daily living.

== History ==
=== Beginnings ===
Lloyd Arthur Meeker was born on February 25, 1907. By 1929 he had already begun to experiment with Attunement. Emissaries of Divine Light dates its origin to Meeker's spiritual awakening on September 16, 1932. On three successive evenings, Meeker had been compelled to write and, as he did so, he was said to have experienced a higher spiritual awareness that flowed through him. He reported that he had been looking for a teacher but realized through his awakening that the teacher he sought was within him.

Meeker lectured, taught, and practiced Attunement in various locations in North America from 1929 to 1945. He wrote under the pen name Uranda, and he was known to his followers by that name. In 1945 Meeker established his headquarters at Sunrise Ranch, which was a dryland farm at the time. From 1952 to 1954 he conducted six-month Servers Training School classes at Sunrise Ranch, teaching Attunement and the spiritual understanding behind the practice, as well as practical spirituality. These classes were attended by people from many backgrounds and included GPC (God-Patient-Chiropractor) chiropractors, led by a former Major League Baseball pitcher, George Shears, and others.

On August 4, 1954, while flying to Reno, Nevada, Meeker crashed his Cessna 180 plane into San Francisco Bay shortly after taking off from Oakland, California. He, his wife Kathy Meeker, his close associate Albert Ackerley, and two children all died in the crash. Shortly after, the Civil Aeronautics Administration found Meeker guilty of two flight violations that both could have resulted him being fined or grounded, though there was no finding or attribution of responsibility as to the cause of the crash. According to the CAA, though he was cleared for takeoff by the Oakland tower operator and proceeded to fly through 1,000 feet of clouds, Meeker did not have an instrument pilot's rating which would have qualified him to fly through clouds. His medical certificate, required by every private flier, had also expired four days prior to the crash. Lord Martin Cecil (1909-1988), who had worked closely with Meeker after being introduced to him by Conrad O'Brien-ffrench, assumed the responsibility for leading Emissaries of Divine Light from 1954 until he died in 1988. Lord Martin succeeded his older brother to become The 7th Marquess of Exeter in October 1981.

=== Development under Lord Martin Cecil's leadership ===
Lord Martin Cecil was the second son of William Cecil, 5th Marquess of Exeter and was descended from William Cecil, 1st Baron Burghley, chief adviser to Queen Elizabeth I. He led a ranching operation on his family's property in the Cariboo country of British Columbia. In 1948, Cecil formed a spiritual community at 100 Mile House, BC. On the death of his brother, David Cecil, 6th Marquess of Exeter, in October 1981, he became The 7th Marquess of Exeter and a member of the House of Lords of the United Kingdom. However, he never spoke in the House.

Under Lord Martin's leadership, the network grew to about 4,000 adherents. Many young people, disenchanted with the Vietnam War and inspired by the idealism of the 1960s and ’70s, were drawn to his message and the network that was growing around him. Twelve centers developed around the world, and numerous other nonprofit organizations were birthed by participants in Emissaries of Divine Light. These included an outdoor adventure educational organization, Educo; an association of spiritually based business people, Renaissance Business Associates; an association of media professionals, Association for Responsible Communication; an association of educators, Renaissance Educational Associates; and Emissary Foundation International.

Bill Bahan became an important leader and teacher for Emissaries of Divine Light in the ’60s, ’70s, and early ’80s, offering classes at Sunrise Ranch; Epping, New Hampshire; and Livingston Manor, New York. He was a nephew of George Shears, D.C., leader of the G-P-C Chiropractic Movement. Bill and his brother, Walter Bahan (also active in the Emissary program), along with three other brothers (all five chiropractors), operated the Bahan and Bahan Chiropractic Clinics in Salem and Derry, New Hampshire, using GPC principles. Bill founded the Whole Health Institute, an association of healthcare professionals promoting wholistic health. They hosted conferences and lectures around the world, and published the journal Healing Currents. In Bill's words, "Health is the unhindered expression of life through the body, truth through the mind, and love through the heart."

=== Accusations of being a cult ===
Since the group's inception, the Emissaries of Divine Light (EDL) have been accused of being a cult by local reporting, former members, and members of the general public alike. In 1990, an investigative article by Mike O’Keeffe was published in Westword featuring interviews with multiple current and former Emissaries. One anonymous former Emissary using the pseudonym of "John" told Westword that “It's like being a rape victim,” referring to his time in and subsequently leaving the group. He said it's like “You've lost years of your life. You're ashamed for having been fooled, and thinking about it, going over it in your head, is very unpleasant.” John also detailed how the Emissaries believe that spiritual resonation through Attunement may be used to cure diseases, which they say are caused by negative emotions. John claimed that, after one Emissary contracted pneumonia, the Attunement he was treated with did not make him better and that his condition significantly worsened until EDL authorities were convinced by someone to take him to a doctor. John further added that “The cost to somebody who pursues their program is high,” and that “You give up your career and educational aspirations, you give up your ability to make your own decisions. They're essentially a little fiefdom whose main purpose is the comfort and self-aggrandizement of a small elite."

Expanding on this, O’Keeffe wrote about how former Sunrise Ranch residents complained that the then-small allowance of $100 a month that each Sunset Ranch resident received for their work essentially trapped the Emissaries on the ranch. "You become a slave. You work all day for nothing, because you're made to feel like you're sacrificing for God," said Renee, another interviewed ex-Emissary who left the group eight years after joining. There was a $10 charge to drive an Emissary vehicle into Loveland, and a $30 charge to use one to go to Denver, claimed Renee. The EDL's education director at the time, Alan Hammond, responded to these claims by saying “I'm not sure how many citizens have housing, food, medicine, vitamins, and supplementary income provided.” He added “Most people don't live as well as the people at Sunrise Ranch," and noted that EDL member stipends had been only scant a few years prior (before 1990) because the EDL was not as affluent at the time.

Some former female Emissaries also claimed that other Emissaries "played sexual power politics", according to O'Keeffe. According to Renee, "As long as a man is in a higher spiritual position than a woman, regardless of whether he is married, he can have sex with her.” Renee further explained that "It's set up to promote spirituality, but ends up justifying for men their desire to have sex with whomever they want to.” To this, Hammond responded “We believe in doing the noble and honorable in all things, and particularly in sex, which is such a core area of living.”

Another former member, David, described the leadership of the Emissaries of Divine Light as "an autocracy", explaining how, after the death of former leader Martin Exeter, there was no discussion from the followers about who should lead the Emissaries before Exeter's son Michael became the new leader. David first got involved with the Emissaries after attending a lecture hosted by Emissary George Emery in Madison, Washington that focused on “holistic living." “He was a Salesman, and a very good one,” said David about the Emissary. After, Emery had invited David to an upcoming weeklong seminar in Indiana, saying that David was lucky as they had just had a cancellation and so had an extra spot available. “I jumped in with both feet first,” said David. However, David claimed that he wasn't made aware of the belief system of the Emissaries at first, and that it took years of classes that got progressively longer and more intensive before he fully understood. To this, Hammond denied the notion that the Emissaries intentionally leave people unaware of EDL beliefs over a long time, and said “We're endeavoring to help them find themselves as soon as possible.”

Nancy Miquelon, a former Emissary who had (before 1990) since joined the Cult Awareness Network, said that the Emissaries of Divine Light are a destructive cult. She also described the strong and seemingly-unconditional acceptance that ex-Emissaries recount receiving when they joined the group as love bombing. Steve Hassan, former Unification Church official turned cult expert, compared the EDL to the “Moonies” and the Hare Krishnas, similarly adding that he'd consider the EDL to be a destructive cult. Additionally, he said that denying negative emotions (emotions which other ex-Emissaries have said that the group claims causes disease) forces people to sacrifice part of their identities.

After Ray Mickelic, another former Emissary and Sunset Ranch resident, confessed to authorities that he'd sexually assaulted children for 10 years, several former Emissaries partially blamed the EDL because of their emphasis on the purity of “creative acts”, claimed John. “There's no question in my mind he used Emissary teachings to provide a justification mechanism,” John continued. Renee agreed, saying “Ray Mickelic found justification for what he did from the Emissaries.” Other ex-Emissaries said that Mickelic may have thought he was part of a chosen group who could do no wrong. To this possibility, Hassan said that “It may weaken a natural human system of checks and balances, a system that keeps deviant behavior in check.” EDL officials, however, said that Mickelic was not deeply involved at Sunrise Ranch. Mickelic was hired to produce calendars for the ranch and was "involved in other Sunrise business transactions." “Everybody acts like they didn't know Ray, but Ray was part of EDL for years," another ex-follower said. Hammond rebuked these claims, saying “Let me say unequivocally that Ray never picked up anything at Emissary meetings that could justify what he's accused of."

Referring to Michael Exeter, “The man running the show now is more concerned about the effects of people's actions on each other than his father,” said Renee. Other observers agreed that the Emissaries had been working to make internal changes since.

In 2014, former Emissary Linda Grindstaff sued the Emissaries of Divine Light and claimed that the EDL made her work without pay. She further claimed that the group tried to sell her home. Additionally, she accused that the group doctrine encouraged "triangles," which consisted of one man and two or more women having sexual encounters, because this would "handle and protect" the man's spiritual expression and spiritually purify the women. Similarly, she claims that her husband would often be assigned to "counsel" other women in the group and share "Attunements" with them, during which he and the women he was "counseling" would have sex.

=== Transition after Lord Exeter's death ===
When Lord Exeter died in January 1988, his son, Michael Cecil, 8th Marquess of Exeter (formerly known as Lord Burghley), became the leader of Emissaries of Divine Light until he left the organization in 1996. In that eight-year period, much of the leadership left the organization, including most of the children of both Lloyd Arthur Meeker and Martin Cecil, 7th Marquess of Exeter, who had been prominent in the network. From 1988 to 1996, more than two-thirds of the participants in Emissaries of Divine Light left as well. Many ex-members became bitter about their experience and launched accusations against the organization. One member, Robert Coates, even began playing football in one of the group's most sacred spaces.

As the 8th Marquess of Exeter resigned from his position in 1996, a group of trustees assumed responsibility for the leadership of the network. They set in place ethical guidelines throughout the network and addressed grievances brought to them by participants. They sought to bring the universal truths taught by Lloyd Arthur Meeker into contemporary language and practice.

=== Recent history ===
In the 1990s, Emissaries of Divine Light developed new programs for spiritual understanding and personal development. Deepening Spiritual Expression and The Opening are week-long residential programs that are still offered by the organization. They also developed Attunement Practitioner certification training, which is available at many Emissary centers.

In August 2004, the trustees of Emissaries of Divine Light named David Karchere as the leader of the global network. In 2008, David Karchere and Jane Anetrini developed and taught a year-long leadership program based on the teachings of Emissaries of Divine Light. A second session of the program was conducted in 2009 and 2010. In 2012 they initiated a new series of seminars under the title Practical Spirituality: An Operator's Guide to Being Human, led by David Karchere.

== Sunrise Ranch ==
The headquarters of Emissaries of Divine Light was established in 1945 at Sunrise Ranch in Loveland, Colorado, now a conference and retreat center staffed by a community of eighty-five people. Sunrise Ranch hosts workshops, seminars and retreats intended to offer the participants fresh thinking and understanding, leading to a direct experience of spiritual renewal. There are seven other major centers around the world for Emissaries of Divine Light, each offering programs with a similar approach.

Sunrise Ranch also offers residential work-study programs in practical spirituality, which it defines as the application of universal spiritual principles to the common issues of human life. These include a program designed for personal spiritual renewal, called Full Self Emergence, and a Permaculture Design Course for people interested in sustainable human systems and sustainable agriculture.

From 2013 to 2019, ARISE Music Festival was held at Sunrise Ranch. However, in 2020, the festival was cancelled, and since 2021 ARISE has no longer been hosted at Sunrise Ranch. During their time hosting the event, one journalist accused the Emissaries of using the festival to recruit people into their "cult".

== Creative Field Project ==
The trustees of Emissaries of Divine Light lead the Creative Field Project. The project is an exploration of the power of human intention to influence the field of energy held by a group of people. The Creative Field Project began in 2009 with a network of small groups around the world that meet monthly by telephone. It included the first Creative Field Conference in 2011 at Sunrise Ranch that featured Lynne McTaggart, who wrote The Field; and American priest and theologian Matthew Fox. In 2012, Emissaries of Divine Light joined with the Novalis Ubuntu Institute in Cape Town, South Africa, to host the Creative Field Conference—South Africa: Your Destiny Is Calling.

== Teaching and practices ==
=== Overview ===
The mission of Emissaries of Divine Light, as cited in its articles of incorporation, is to assist in the spiritual regeneration of humanity under the inspiration of the divine spirit. Meeker saw the work of the Emissaries as an approach to spirituality that transcends physical and mental disciplines, and offers human beings the opportunity to experience their true identity by giving expression to the qualities of spirit that align with their divine nature.

Emissaries of Divine Light teach that the key to creative living is the individual's openness to the source of universal power and intelligence within them, and that human emotions either connect a person to that source or cut them off from it. The educational programs of the Emissaries are designed to assist people to find out what has been emotionally triggering them, so that they can withdraw their emotional attention from the trigger and turn it to the life force within them. The Emissaries believe that behind all emotions is the universal power of love and a universal intelligence that bring spiritual enlightenment. They teach that through deliberate conscious thought a person can let their own emotional current purify, so that they open themselves to the flow of the universal power and intelligence within them.

=== The One Law ===
The central teaching of Emissaries of Divine Light is referred to as The One Law. They describe it as a law of cause and effect. They see the causative factor in spiritual regeneration as the universal power and intelligence within all people, and the effect in human experience as dependent on the response to that internal reality. They describe the creative process in human experience as the working of The One Law in a sequence of five stages: radiation, response, attraction, union and unified radiation. Their seminars claim to assist people to withdraw their energetic response from the circumstances around them and direct it to the power and intelligence within them.

Emissaries of Divine Light describe the process of personal spiritual renewal as Full Self Emergence because they believe that a person is renewed when their own divine selfhood is expressed through their mind, emotions and their body. They use the story of the Seven Days of Creation in Genesis as a symbolic template for the process of spiritual renewal in the life of the individual, and for humankind as a whole.

=== Attunement ===
Attunement is a central practice of Emissaries of Divine Light. The origin of the word Attunement refers to the attuning of the human capacity with the universal animating spirit within all people. Attunement practitioners believe that positive shifts in consciousness release a healing energy through a person's body, mind and emotions.

Emissaries of Divine Light practice Attunement as a form of energy medicine. Attunement practitioners believe that universal life energy is conveyed to the client through the hands of the practitioner. The primary contact points for the client receiving the Attunement are the endocrine glands. Attunement practitioners teach that the endocrine glands are portals for universal life energy that operates through the physical body, and through the mental and emotional function of the individual.

Emissaries of Divine Light also teach Attunement as a personal spiritual practice. They believe it is a central factor in the conscious evolution of humanity.

== Leadership ==
Emissaries of Divine Light is led by David Karchere, who is the spiritual director of the organization, and six other trustees. Karchere lives, writes and teaches at Sunrise Ranch, and travels in North America, Europe, Africa and Australia, offering programs on practical spirituality and Attunement.

The trustees are elected by an International Emissary Congress with representatives from Emissary organizations around the world. Currently, the trustees are Jane Anetrini, Ruth Buckingham, Hugh Duff, David Karchere, Marilyn Manderson, Phil Richardson and Maureen Waller.

== Major centers ==
In addition to their international headquarters at Sunrise Ranch, Emissaries of Divine Light used to operate Glen Ivy in Corona, California, as a conference and retreat center and an Attunement teaching center. Glen Ivy is also a natural mineral springs. The Emissaries leased the mineral springs and the spa property adjacent to their center to Glen Ivy Hot Springs, a popular destination in Southern California. The property was sold in 2016.

These are the major centers for Emissaries of Divine Light around the world:

- Edenvale, Abbotsford, British Columbia, Canada
- Gate House, Constantia, South Africa
- Riverdell, Gawler, South Australia, Australia
- Sunrise Ranch, Loveland, Colorado, USA

== Publications ==
Beginning in the 1930s, Emissaries of Divine Light have continually published their writings and teachings and circulated these to their membership. In 1936, Lloyd A. Meeker published his seven-week meditation guide, Seven Steps to the Temple of Light, as well as his correspondence course, Steps to Mastership. In the 1980s, Martin Cecil published eighteen volumes of his own writing and the writings of Lloyd Meeker under the title The Third Sacred School.

For most of its history, weekly talks and writings of Emissary leadership have been distributed by regular mail. Since 2005, the organization has circulated a weekly e-mail message, The Pulse of Spirit, authored by David Karchere and other current leaders of the network. In 2010 they began to publish the Journal of the Creative Field.

== See also ==
- Divine light
