= Burghley Arms =

Public house in Bourne

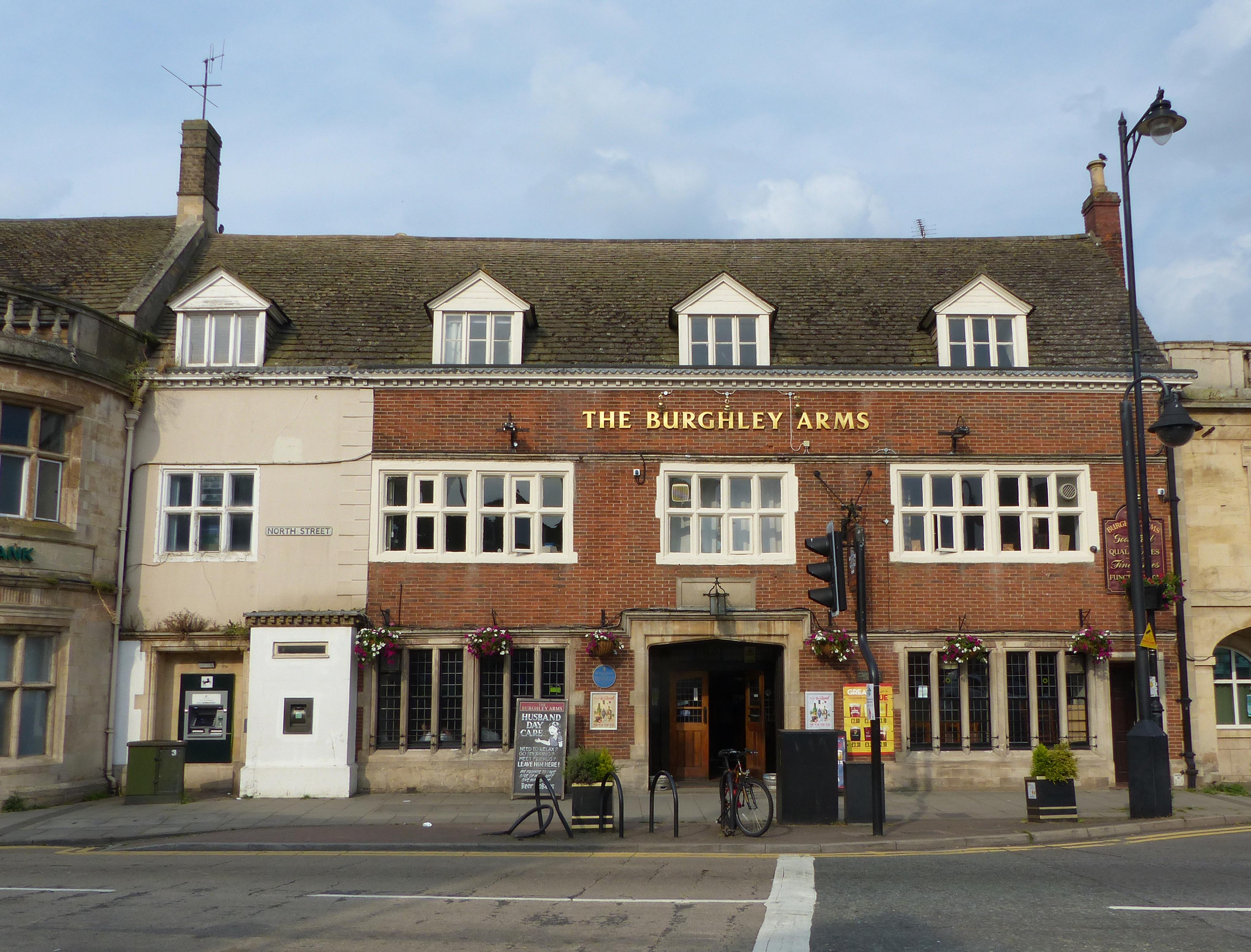
- Burghley Arms façade

- Location within Lincolnshire
- 52.76837°N 0.37697°W
- Location: Bourne, Lincolnshire

History
- Built: before 1520

Site notes
- Owner: Craft Union Pub Company
- Website: https://www.craftunionpubs.com/burghley-arms-inn-bourne

Listed Building – Grade II
- Official name: The Burghley Arms
- Designated: 29 September 1972
- Reference no.: 1241949

The Burghley Arms is a pub in Bourne, Lincolnshire, located at 6 North Street. The statesman William Cecil was born there in 1520.

== History ==
=== Residence ===
Located at the town's marketplace, the building was originally a house, owned by the Hekington family, and was given to William Hekington's daughter, Jane, who married Sir Richard Cecil. In September 1520 it became the birthplace of their first and only son William Cecil, who became the chief adviser to Queen Elizabeth I, and was later elevated to the peerage as Lord Burghley.

=== Public house ===
It ceased to be a residence in 1717, and became a pub, then known as the Bull and Talbot, and by the 19th century was simply known as The Bull Inn. Australian poet and novelist Frederic Manning stayed there for long periods in the interwar years, while writing his 1930 novel Her Privates We, with a blue plaque in his honour being placed on the façade. In October 1955, it was renamed to the Burghley Arms in honour of Lord Burghley, and a plaque was erected on the side of the building by the Bourne Urban District Council. It received Grade II listed status in September 1972.

==== Modern ====
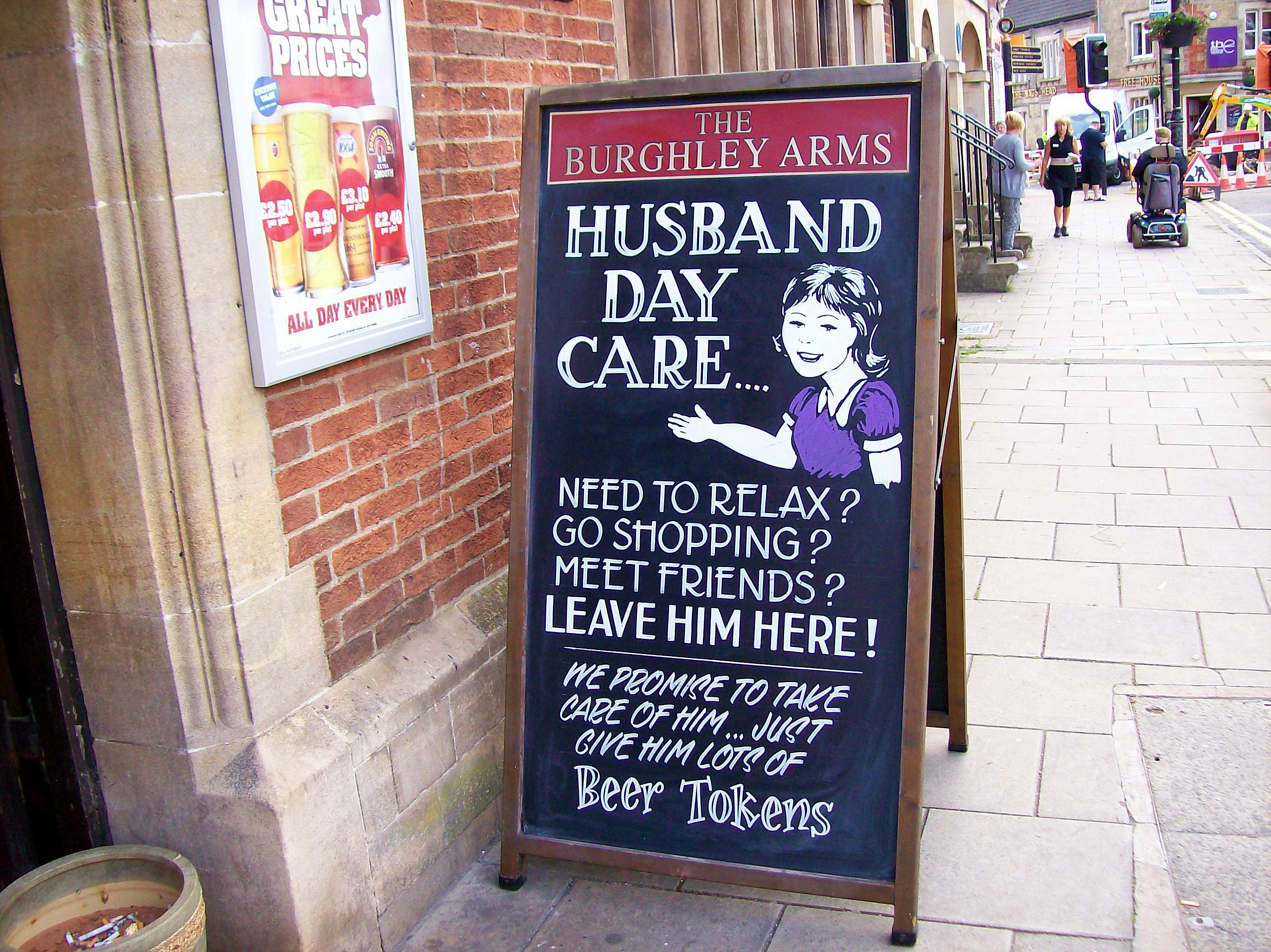

In summer 2015, the pub ran a "husband day care service" for while their wives were out shopping.

A new landlord, Dave Charsley, took over the running of the pub on 15 December 2025.

== Architecture ==
The building has over time been heavily altered, but features a carriage arch, and modern, Tudor-style windows. The roof has three dormers, and an extension to the left built in a matching style forms part of the adjacent bank.
