= Michael Cecil, 8th Marquess of Exeter =

Canadian rancher and businessman (born 1935)

The Most Honourable The Marquess of Exeter
- Born: 1 September 1935 (age 90); Kamloops, British Columbia, Canada
- Education: Eton College
- Spouses: Nancy Meeker (m. 1967; div. 1993) Barbara Anne Magat (m. 1999)
- Children: 2

Member of the House of Lords
- In office 26 April 1989 – 11 November 1999
- Preceded by: 7th Marquess of Exeter
- Succeeded by: Seat abolished

William Michael Anthony Cecil, 8th Marquess of Exeter (born 1 September 1935), is a Canadian rancher, businessman, and peer in the Peerage of the United Kingdom.

Born in Kamloops in British Columbia, he attended schools across rural Canada and, in England, went to Eton College. After leaving school, he returned to Canada to 100 Mile House where he managed a store. In January 1988, Cecil's father, Martin, died, and Cecil succeeded him as the 8th Marquess of Exeter. He also inherited the leadership of the Emissaries of Divine Light, which he ran until his resignation around 1996. After resigning, he moved to Oregon, where he and his wife co-ran The Ashland Institute. As of 2025, he lived in Victoria, British Columbia.

== Life and career ==
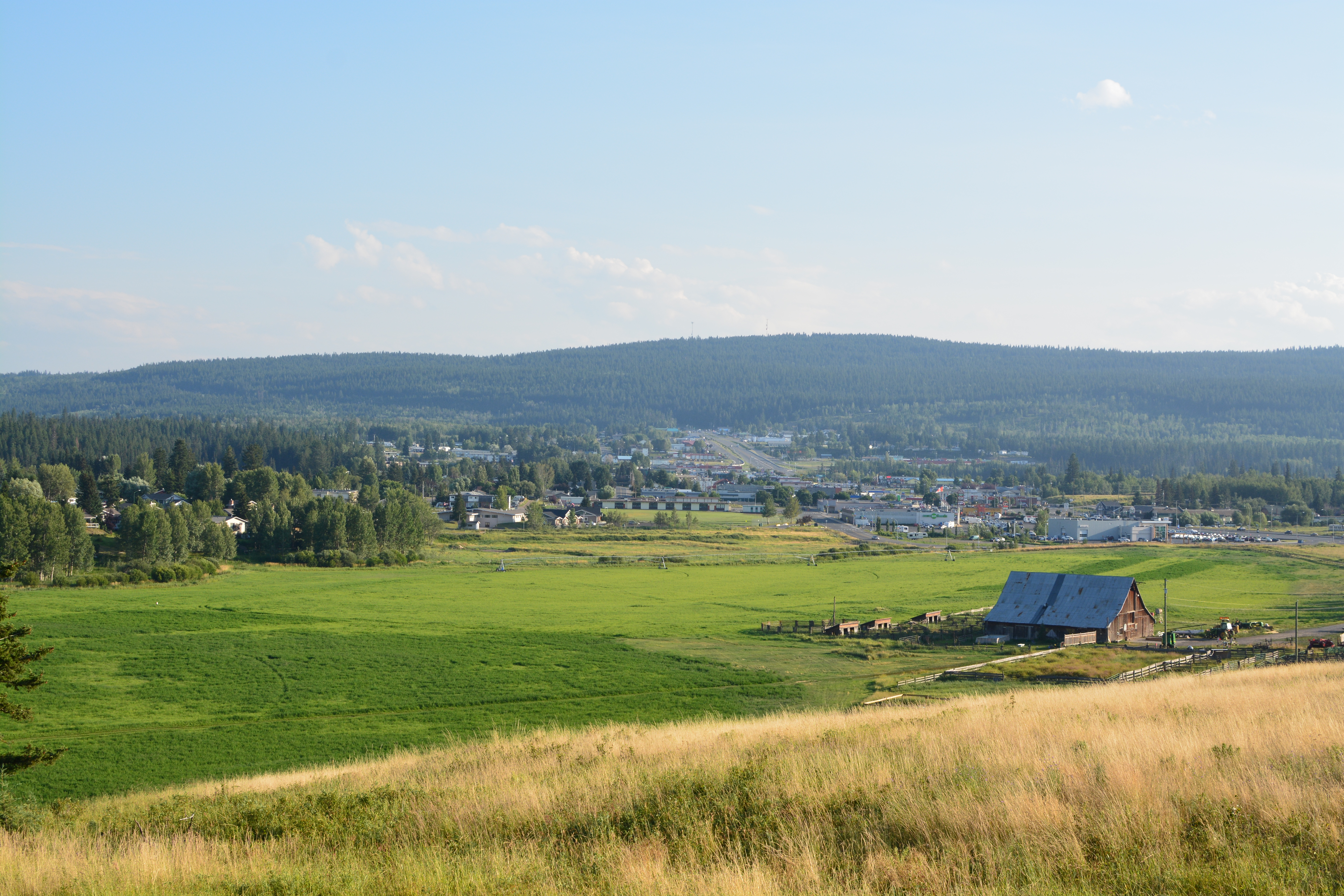
2014 photograph of 100 Mile House, Cecil's hometown.

Cecil was born on 1 September 1935 in Kamloops to William Martin Alleyne Cecil and Edith Csanady de Telegd. Martin had immigrated to Canada in 1930 to manage the family's Bridge Creek Ranch, sized at around 15,000 acres (6,100 ha), which was purchased by Martin's father William Cecil, 5th Marquess of Exeter, in 1912. During that time, it was customary for noblemen to purchase land in the British colonies. Cecil was christened at the ranch in 1935 by the Bishop of Cariboo. He was educated in rural Canada and attended Eton College.

Csanady died on March 30, 1954, after a prolonged illness. Cecil's father remarried in September 1954 to Lillian Johnson, and together they had two daughters: Marina and Janine. Following her death, Cecil returned to Canada to 100 Mile House. He originally intended to visit for just six months; however, he decided to stay in Canada and join the Emissaries of Divine Light, an intentional community which his father ran. Cecil began managing a general store in 100 Mile House, taking over after his father. Two years after he began managing it, Cecil designed and managed another store named the Food Centre, which he ran for four years. Cecil got engaged to Nancy Meeker, daughter of Lloyd Arthur Meeker, founder of the Emissaries of Divine Light, in 1967, marrying later in the year. They had two children: Anthony and Angela. Cecil and Meeker divorced in 1993. Six years later in 1999, Cecil married Barbara Anne Magat. Cecil's uncle—David Cecil, 6th Marquess of Exeter—died in 1981. Because he had no sons to inherit his title, it went to David's brother, Martin, who was also Cecil's father, and he became the 7th marquess. As the heir apparent, Cecil himself became Lord Burghley. As well, ownership of the family's estate in England, Burghley House, was transferred to a charitable trust, with various descendants of the 6th marquess residing at the house.

The title of marquess is still pretty good for getting a decent seat in a restaurant in England. But that's about it.

— Cecil on his title.

In January 1988, Cecil's father died following a short illness. As a result, Cecil inherited his titles and estate, becoming the 8th Marquess of Exeter, which entitled him to a seat in the House of Lords from 26 April 1989 to 11 November 1999, when the House of Lords Act 1999 was passed, excluding all but ninety-two hereditary peers. He made his maiden speech in the House of Lords on 16 May 1990. Before the act was passed, Cecil would travel to England once or twice a year to sit in the House. Due to his infrequent presence, he did not vote in the House, but stated that he had "some wisdom to contribute", and that he was "listed as having things to say on environmental matters".

Cecil also inherited the leadership of the Emissaries of Divine Light. Unlike his father, who had promoted "placing spiritual authority in himself", Cecil decreased the hierarchy within the community and pushed democracy to its members. Beginning in 1993, the Emissaries's leadership switched from a single leader to an international committee of elected trustees. He also largely dismantled the communal system of living within the organisation. Members of the commune credited Cecil with dismantling some hierarchy within the Emissaries of Divine Light, they viewed him as a "reluctant head" and believed that he was not fit for leadership. Cecil resigned as leader and left the commune around 1996.

In 1995, citing differences over "corporate direction", Cecil and his half-sister, Marina Castonguay, agreed to split Bridge Creek Companies, the family business, between the two of them and their respective families. Lilian Cecil, the widow of Cecil's father, divided her interests between the new companies. According to the split, Cecil retained approximately 3,000 acres (1,200 ha) of Bridge Creek Ranch while Castonguay received the remaining 8,000 acres (3,200 ha). Castonguay proceeded to rename her section of the ranch to 100 Mile Ranch. Cecil also held a minority share of Red Coach Inn and several residential lots, while Castonguay received residentially zoned land on 99 Mile Hill and near the local cemetery. Cecil was given the majority of industrial lots on Exeter Road, while Castonguay received some of the lots on the road. Cecil named his company Exeter Lake Holdings, Ltd., and Castonguay named her company 100 Mile Ranch Holdings, Ltd.

After leaving the Emissaries of Divine Light, Cecil proceeded to move to Oregon, where he and his wife co-ran The Ashland Institute in the city of Ashland. In December 2022, Cecil sold Bridge Creek Ranch to the province of British Columbia as part of a treaty process with the province and the Canim Lake Band. As of 2025, he lived in Victoria, British Columbia, with his wife.

== Arms ==
Coat of arms of Michael Cecil, 8th Marquess of Exeter
Crest On a chapeau gules, turned up ermine, a garb or, supported by two Lions, the dexter argent, and the sinister azure. Escutcheon Barry of ten argent and azure over all six escutcheons sable, three, two, and one, each charged with a lion rampant of the first. Supporters On either side a lion ermine. Motto Cor unum via una (One heart, one way).

Peerage of the United Kingdom
Preceded by Martin Cecil	Marquess of Exeter; 1988–present	Incumbent; Heir apparent: Anthony Cecil, Lord Burghley
