= Martin Cecil, 7th Marquess of Exeter =

Anglo-Canadian peer

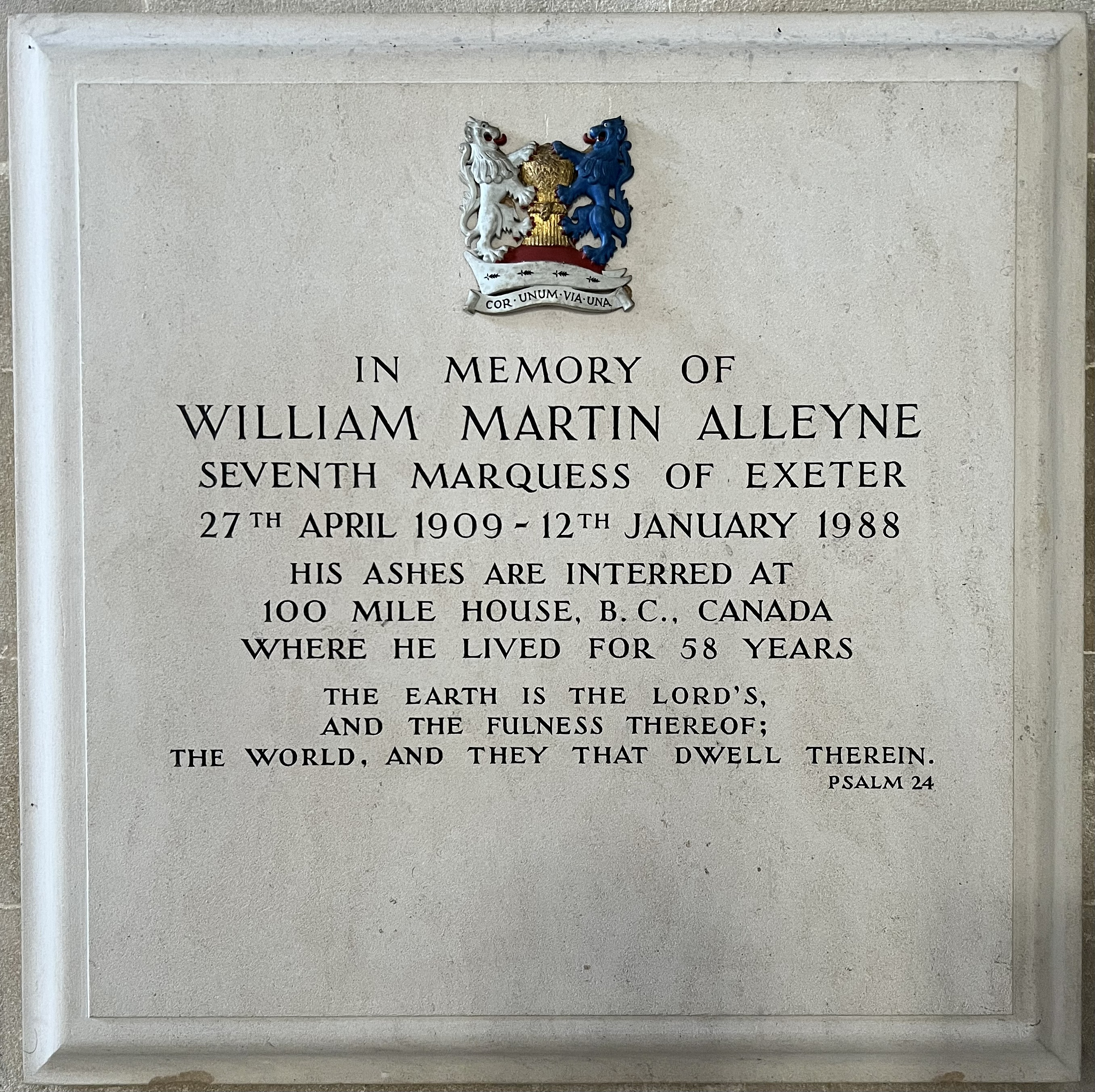
Memorial in St Martin's Church, Stamford

William Martin Alleyne Cecil, 7th Marquess of Exeter (27 April 1909 – 12 January 1988), known until 1981 as Lord Martin Cecil, was an Anglo-Canadian peer.

== Personal ==
Cecil was the second son of William Cecil, 5th Marquess of Exeter and of his wife, the Hon. Myra Orde-Powlett.

He first married Edith Csanady de Telegd on 17 January 1934. They had one child:

- Michael Anthony Cecil, 8th Marquess of Exeter, born on 1 September 1935.

Cecil later married Lillian Johnson on 3 September 1954, with whom he had two children:

- Lady Marina June Brownlow-Cecil (born 16 June 1956)
- Janine Dawn Brownlow-Cecil (12 January 1958 – 3 May 1958).

== Career ==
Cecil was a prominent Canadian cattleman who from 1930 worked the ranch founded by his father at 100 Mile House, British Columbia.

== Peerage ==
In 1981 he succeeded his elder brother David Cecil, 6th Marquess of Exeter in the marquessate. His elder brother did not leave male heirs. William Martin Alleyne Cecil died 12 January 1988, aged 78, and was succeeded in his titles by his only son Michael.

== Emissaries of Divine Light ==
In 1954 Cecil became the head of the Emissaries of Divine Light and established its headquarters at 100 Mile House, British Columbia, spending several months of the year at the group's international headquarters at the Sunrise Ranch, Loveland, Colorado.

== Arms ==
Coat of arms of Martin Cecil, 7th Marquess of Exeter
Crest On a chapeau gules, turned up ermine, a garb or, supported by two Lions, the dexter argent, and the sinister azure. Escutcheon Barry of ten argent and azure over all six escutcheons sable, three, two, and one, each charged with a lion rampant of the first. Supporters On either side a lion ermine. Motto Cor unum via una (One heart, one way).

Peerage of the United Kingdom
Preceded by David George Brownlow Cecil	Marquess of Exeter; 1981–1988	Succeeded by William Michael Anthony Cecil
