= Frederic Manning =

Australian poet and novelist

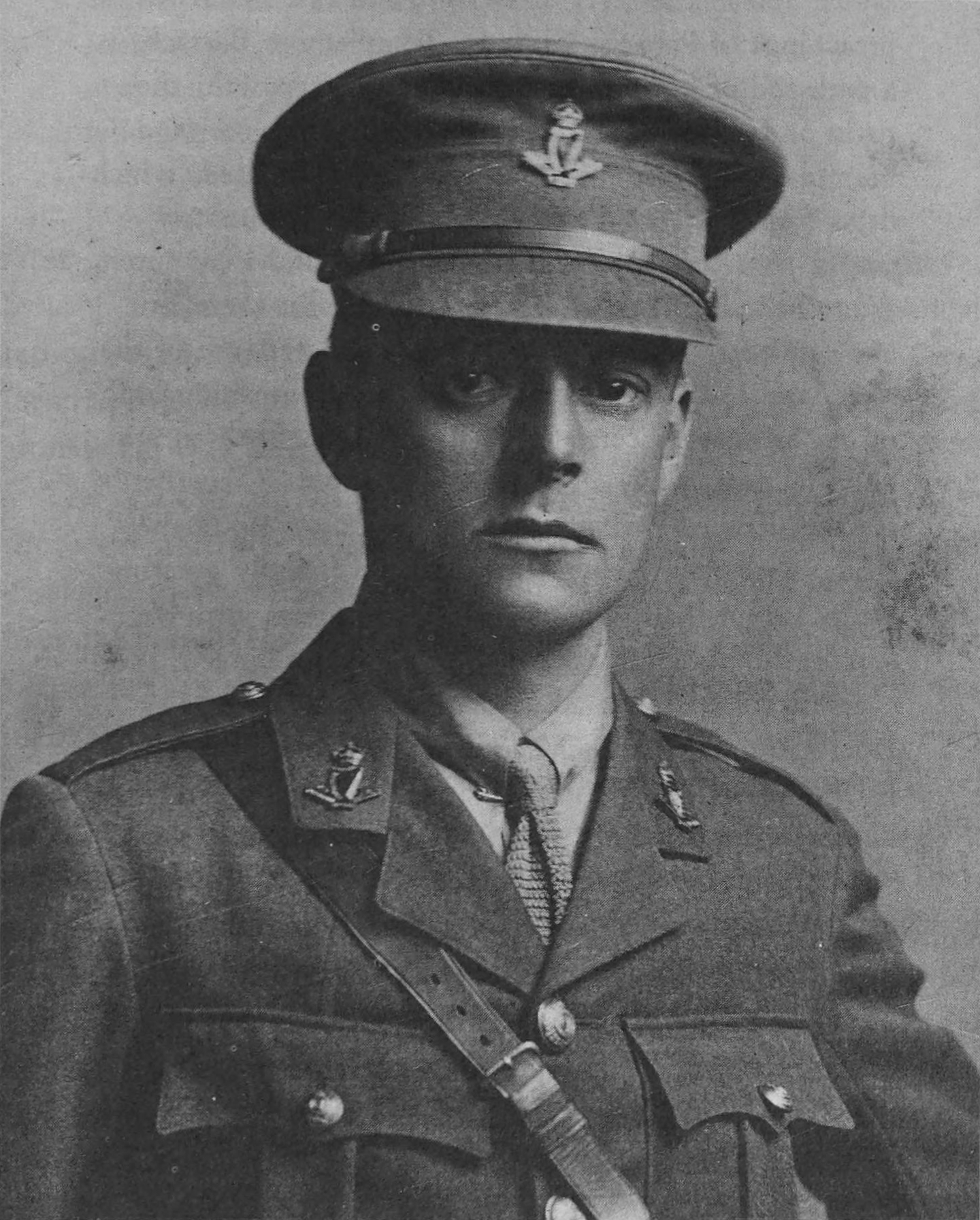
- Born: 22 July 1882; Sydney, New South Wales, Australia
- Died: 22 February 1935 (aged 52); Hampstead, London, England
- Occupations: Poet, Novelist
- Writing career
- Pen name: Private 19022
- Period: 1907–1929
- Genres: Poetry, War Fiction, Biography
- Subject: Sir William White

Frederic Manning (22 July 1882 – 22 February 1935) was an Australian poet and novelist.

== Biography ==
Born in Sydney, Manning was one of eight children of local politician Sir William Patrick Manning. His family were Roman Catholics of Irish origin. A sickly child who suffered from asthma, Manning was educated exclusively at home. As a teenager he formed a close friendship with the Reverend Arthur Galton, a scholarly man who was secretary to the Governor of New South Wales. Galton went home to England in 1898, taking Manning with him. Manning returned to Australia in 1900 but finally settled in the United Kingdom in 1903.

== Early years in England ==
Manning moved in with Galton, who had become vicar of Edenham, a village about three miles north-west of Bourne in south Lincolnshire. He devoted his time to study, reading voraciously, particularly the classics and philosophy, under the domineering influence of Galton. Although he seemingly shared Galton's contempt for Catholicism, Manning never renounced it entirely. He made several unsuccessful attempts to write a historical novel, and in 1907 published his first book, The Vigil of Brunhild, which was a monologue written in verse. Scenes and Portraits followed in 1909, which was a discussion of religious topics written in the form of a series of debates in which those taking part are leading lights from the past, such as Socrates, Francis of Assisi and Thomas Cromwell. These books went down well in literary circles, but did not enjoy a particularly wide circulation. Manning was recognised as an up-and-coming writer, a reputation that the indifferent collection Poems (1910) did not dissipate.

Manning was never very robust, neither was his lifestyle particularly healthy. In the years immediately before World War I, he started to move in London artistic circles, becoming friends with Max Beerbohm and William Rothenstein (there is a collection of letters from Manning to Rothenstein), as well as the influential young poets Ezra Pound and Richard Aldington.

== First World War ==
When war broke out, Manning was keen to enlist, possibly to escape from a stifling environment and to widen his horizons. A man with his fragile constitution and unhealthy lifestyle was not going to be an attractive proposition for the military authorities, but in October 1915 after several attempts, his persistence paid off and he enlisted in the King's Shropshire Light Infantry. He was a private with the service number 19022. He was selected for officer training, but failed the course. Sent to France in 1916, Manning experienced action with the 7th Battalion at the Battle of the Somme, was promoted to lance-corporal and experienced life in the trenches. He was recalled for further training and posted to Ireland in May 1917 with a commission as a second lieutenant in the Royal Irish Regiment. The life of an officer did not agree with him; he seems not to have integrated particularly well and he drank excessively, getting into trouble with his superiors. His inebriation was put down to neurasthenia, but Manning resigned his commission on 28 February 1918.

== Later career ==
Manning continued to write. In 1917 he published a collection of poems under the title Ediola. This was a mixture of verse predominantly in his former style alongside war poems heavily influenced by the imagism of Pound, which deal introspectively with personal aims and ideals tempered in the crucible of battle. He contributed to anthologies, for example, The Monthly Chapbook which appeared in July 1919 edited by Harold Monro, containing twenty-three poems by writers including John Alford, Herbert Read, Walter De La Mare, Osbert Sitwell, Siegfried Sassoon, D. H. Lawrence, Edith Sitwell, Robert Nichols, Rose Macaulay and W. H. Davies alongside Manning and Aldington. He wrote for periodicals, including The Criterion, which was produced by T. S. Eliot.

Poetry did not pay, and so in 1923 Manning took a commission from his publisher John Murray to write The Life of Sir William White, a biography of the man who, as Director of Naval Construction, led the build-up of the Royal Navy in the last years of the nineteenth century. Galton had died in 1921, which not only left Manning effectively homeless, but also lacking a forceful directing influence in his life. He lived for much of the time at the Bull Hotel in Bourne, apart from a short spell when he owned a farmhouse in Surrey. At this time he was friendly with T. E. Lawrence, then serving in the Royal Air Force at RAF Cranwell, some twenty miles (a motorcycle ride) from where Manning was living. In 1926 he contributed the introduction to an edition of Epicurus's Morals: Collected and faithfully Englished by Walter Charleton, originally published in 1656, published in a limited edition by Peter Davies.

== The Middle Parts of Fortune ==
In the 1920s the demand for writing on the war started to grow, the catalyst being the play Journey's End written by R. C. Sherriff which first appeared in 1928. Davies urged Manning to use his undoubted talent to write a novel about his intense wartime experiences. To capture the moment, Manning worked rapidly, with little opportunity for second drafts and revisions. The result was The Middle Parts of Fortune, published anonymously by Peter Davies and the Piazza Press in a numbered limited edition of 520 copies in 1929, which are now collector's items. The book is an account in the vernacular of the lives of ordinary soldiers. The protagonist, Bourne, is the filter through which Manning's experiences are transposed into the lives of a group of men whose qualities interact in response to conflict and comradeship. Bourne is an enigmatic, detached character (a self-portrait of the author) who leaves each of the protagonists alone with their own detachment, privy to their own thoughts.

An expurgated version was published by Davies in 1930 under the title Her Privates We. There is a quotation from Shakespeare at the start of each chapter, and this particular reference occurs in Hamlet. In Act 2, Scene 2, there is a jocular exchange between Prince Hamlet, Rosencrantz and Guildenstern:

Guildenstern: On Fortune's cap we are not the very button.
Hamlet: Nor the soles of her shoe?
Rosencrantz: Neither, my lord.
Hamlet: Then you live about her waist, or in the middle of her favours?
Guildenstern: Faith, her privates we.
Hamlet: In the secret parts of fortune? O, most true; she is a strumpet.

The original publication of this edition credited authorship to "Private 19022", possibly a desire for anonymity or another pun on "private soldier" and "private parts". Manning was first credited with authorship posthumously in 1943 but the original text was published widely only in 1977. Amongst the voices raised in praise were those of Arnold Bennett, Ernest Hemingway, Ezra Pound (who cited Manning as a literary mentor) and T. E. Lawrence, who claimed to have seen through the anonymity and recognised the author of Scenes and Portraits. Be that as it may, Scenes and Portraits was re-published by Peter Davies in 1930 and Manning lived out his life basking in the afterglow of what is widely regarded as one of the finest novels based upon the experiences of warfare. T. E. Lawrence said of The Middle Parts of Fortune that "your book be famous for as long as the war is cared for – and perhaps longer, for there is more than soldiering in it. You have been exactly fair to everyone, of all ranks: and all your people are alive". Ernest Hemingway called it "the finest and noblest novel to come out of World War I".

== Later life ==
Frederic Manning never married. His biographers suggest he eschewed intimacy, and that his long-time host Galton and the hostesses of the literary salons which he visited should be seen as "parent-substitute" figures. Like his hero Bourne, Manning was a private person, who kept his own counsel. Manning died of respiratory diseases at a Hampstead nursing home on 22 February 1935. His obituary appeared in The Times on 26 February 1935. He is interred at Kensal Green Cemetery. The National Portrait Gallery holds a 1921 depiction of Frederic Manning by William Rothenstein (NPG 4417) in sanguine and white chalk.

== Works ==
- Frederic Manning: The Vigil of Brunhild: A Narrative Poem J. Murray London 1907
- Frederic Manning: Scenes and Portraits J. Murray London 1909
- Frederic Manning: Poems J. Murray London 1910
- Frederic Manning: Eidola J. Murray London 1917
- Frederic Manning: The Life of Sir William White. London: John Murray (1923)
- Walter Charleton: Epicurus's Morals: Collected and Faithfully Englished (with an introductory essay by Frederic Manning) Peter Davies London 1926
- Anonymous: The Middle Parts of Fortune: Somme & Ancre, 1916 The Piazza Press, issued to subscribers by Peter Davies London 1929
- Private 19022: Her Privates We Peter Davies London 1930 ISBN 1-85242-717-5
- Frederic Manning: Scenes and Portraits (revised enlarged edition) Peter Davies London 1930
- Manning, Frederic (1977). The Middle Parts of Fortune: Somme & Ancre, 1916 (introduction by Michael Howard). Peter Davies. ISBN 0-432-09081-9.
- Manning, Frederic (1999). Her Privates We (introduction by William Boyd). Serpent's Tail. ISBN 1-85242-717-5.
