= Attunement =

Term adopted by practitioners of energy medicine

Attunement was the early term adopted by practitioners of the pseudoscientific discipline of energy medicine, originally developed by Lloyd Arthur Meeker (1907–1954) and his colleagues. Meeker taught and practiced Attunement as a central feature of his spiritual teaching and ministry, Emissaries of Divine Light. Attunement is taught as a personal spiritual practice and as a healing modality offered through the hands. Emissaries of Divine Light believe that Attunement is a pivotal factor in the conscious evolution of humanity.

Like qigong, reiki, and therapeutic touch, attunement is a putative practice as defined by the United States National Center for Complementary and Integrative Health (NCCIH), lacking published scientific study of its effectiveness. Attunement practitioners and clients rely on personal and anecdotal experience to promote it.

== History ==
=== Beginnings ===
Lloyd Arthur Meeker shared the first Attunement with Rudolph Plagge in Wichita, Kansas, in 1929, and developed the teaching and practice of Attunement with colleagues until his death in 1954. From September 14 to 16, 1932, Meeker had a spiritual awakening experience that he described as a “heavenly ordination.” He marked that experience as the initiation of Emissaries of Divine Light. That same year he instituted a series of energy medicine experiments. Meeker reported that he could stand across the room from the client and the client could feel the intensification of life force. He also reported excellent results when his hands were one to six inches from the client.

Lloyd Arthur Meeker wrote and lectured using the name Uranda, which was how he was known to his followers. From 1935 to 1945, Meeker traveled across the United States and Canada, establishing centers for healing and spiritual teaching for varying periods of time in Atascadero, Oakland, Burbank and Long Beach, California; Buffalo, New York; Grand Forks, Iowa; and Loveland, Colorado. In December 1945 Meeker established his headquarters at Sunrise Ranch in Loveland, where Attunement continues to be taught and practiced.

=== The role of G-P-C chiropractors ===
The G-P-C movement played a significant role in the development of attunement. G-P-C stood for God – Patient – Chiropractor. It was a no-fee system of service that George Shears created in the late 1930s after he, himself, had a severely debilitating ruptured disk, and vowed to offer his services on a donation basis. Shears had been a Major League Baseball pitcher in 1912, and then a graduate of the Palmer School of Chiropractic in 1917. He experimented with "no-force" chiropractic adjustments in which he believed it was the healing energy through his hands that brought positive results, shown through x-rays. The G-P-C movement saw the relationship between the chiropractor and the patient as the base of a triangle with God at the apex. Meeker eventually embraced this model for the healing relationship.

In 1949, Albert Ackerley, a G-P-C chiropractor in Toronto, Ontario, Canada, was introduced to Lloyd Arthur Meeker's writings. In June 1949, when Ackerley was preparing to offer an adjustment to his patient, he saw that the patient's spine had aligned before he had given the adjustment. He believed that this result was a consequence of the flow of subtle energy between himself and the patient, rather than any physical intervention. Ackerley met Meeker in July 1949 and began to practice Attunement under his tutelage. Up to this point, Meeker had referred to Attunements as “treatments.” It was Albert Ackerley who named those treatments “Attunements.” With Lloyd Meeker's urging, Ackerley began to experiment with long-distance Attunements in which the person receiving the Attunement was not in the physical presence of the practitioner. Albert Ackerley and G.P.C. President, Virgil Givens, were both prosecuted legally due to their practice of energy medicine, but continued to practice nonetheless.

In May 1950, Lloyd Arthur Meeker met George Shears. Meeker's meeting with Shears was followed by G-P-C meetings at a Chiropractic Convention in August 1950 in Davenport, Iowa, and then a G-P-C conference in Huntingburg, Indiana, which was attended by Meeker. Following these events, about twenty-five chiropractors attended a G-P-C Convention from September 2 through 8 of that year at Sunrise Ranch.

The prospect of joining with Meeker and Emissaries of Divine Light raised suspicion and concerns among the G-P-C chiropractors. Nonetheless, at the G-P-C Convention in the home of George Shears in Huntingburg, Indiana, on February 24 and 25, 1951, the G-P-C board of directors voted to cooperate with the Emissaries to establish a G-P-C Servers Training School at Sunrise Ranch. Lloyd Arthur Meeker led three six-month G-P-C Servers Training School sessions at Sunrise Ranch from 1952 to 1954. His classes from the 1952 session were transcribed and published as The Divine Design of Man, # 1 and # 2. The audio recordings and the transcripts of Meeker's classes from the 1953 and 1954 sessions are still extant. The sessions included Attunement technique, nutrition, psychology and a broad spectrum of spiritual teachings.

In August 1954, Lloyd Arthur Meeker, his wife, Kathy Meeker, Albert Ackerley and two children died in the crash of Meeker's small plane in San Francisco Bay. A close associate of Meeker's, Martin Cecil, assumed the responsibility for the leadership of Emissaries of Divine Light and for carrying forward Meeker's Attunement work. With assistance from G-P-C chiropractors, James Wellemeyer and Bill Bahan, and from Roger de Winton, Alan Hammond and others, Martin Cecil continued the Servers Training School at Sunrise Ranch and the teaching of Attunement. George Shears eventually moved to Sunrise Ranch in 1968 where he practiced Attunement until he died in 1978.

=== Development ===
As Emissaries of Divine Light grew in the 1960s, '70s and '80s, so did the teaching and practice of Attunement. Martin Cecil emphasized in his teaching of Attunement that the basis of it was a spiritual practice. While many of the early Attunement practitioners were chiropractors, lay people became increasingly active in the practice. Building on the early work of Lloyd Arthur Meeker, Attunement evolved to include groups of people practicing it together. In 1993, a World Blessing time was established for practitioners to share a time of collective Attunement and healing prayer. In the '80s and '90s, the teaching and practice of long-distance Attunement was developed further.

Following Martin Cecil's death in 1988, his son, Michael Cecil, become the Spiritual Leader of the Emissaries. In 1996, Emissaries of Divine Light formed an Attunement Guild, which established standards for the teaching and certification of Attunement practitioners. A group of Attunement practitioners, including Chris Jorgensen and Andrew Shier, formed the International Association of Attunement Practitioners (IAAP) in 1999. IAAP developed and taught the practice of Attunement separate from the organization of Emissaries of Divine Light. Roger de Winton continued his Attunement trainings through Attunement Intensives offered at Sunrise Ranch. He also continued his work of long-distance Attunement until his death in 2001.

In 1996, Michael Cecil left Emissaries of Divine Light to continue his own work, which includes Attunement through The Ashland Institute. A group of trustees assumed the leadership of Emissaries of Divine Light with Michael Cecil's departure. In August 2004, the trustees of Emissaries of Divine Light named David Karchere as the leader of the global network. Since becoming the leader of the Emissaries, Karchere has developed programs, including Life Destiny Immersion and Journey into the Fire, that are designed to assist people to transform the spiritual and emotional factors that block the experience of Attunement. In 2010, with other Attunement practitioners, David Karchere founded the Attunement School at Sunrise Ranch.

== Philosophy ==
Attunement is based on Lloyd Arthur Meeker's vision that the human body is designed to be the temple of God. The foundational principle underlying Attunement is what Meeker named as The One Law, or the Law of Cause and Effect. Emissaries of Divine Light teach that the causative factor in spiritual regeneration is the universal power and intelligence within all people, and that through response and opening to that power and intelligence, people experience healing. Attunement practitioners believe that positive shifts in consciousness release a healing energy through a person's body, mind and emotions. Traditionally, the Attunement practitioner is referred to as a server and the recipient is referred to as a servee.

Attunement servers believe they transmit universal life energy through their hands to the servee. The primary connecting points on the servee are the endocrine glands. Attunement servers teach that the endocrine glands are portals for universal life energy that operates through the physical body, and through the mental and emotional function of the individual, and that the servee has the opportunity to open more fully to the life energy within them through receiving an Attunement.

Emissaries of Divine Light hold that the origin of universal life energy is divine in nature and that the core reality of all people is divine. The goal of Attunement is to increase the energetic flow while removing blockages to that flow so that a person's core reality can emerge.

Lloyd Meeker taught that the human connection to universal life energy relies on pneumaplasm, which was his name for the aura of subtle energy, or etheric body surrounding the physical body. Attunement practitioners believe that pneumaplasm is generated when the universal life energy flows through a person, and that the clarity of the pneumaplasmic body depends on the clarity of that energy flow. Attunement practitioners focus on clarifying and enriching the pneumaplasm associated with the endocrine glands and the anatomical systems of the body.

Practitioners believe that the endocrine glands translate seven aspects of the universal life energy into the human experience. They name these as the Seven Spirits.

Gland	Spirit
Pineal	Love
Pituitary	The Womb
Thyroid	Life
Thymus	Purification
Islets of Langerhans	Blessing
Adrenal gland	Single Eye
Gonads	New Earth

Attunement practitioners relate these Seven Spirits to the Seven Spirits of God referenced in the book of Revelation in the Bible. Some Attunement practitioners correlate the seven endocrine glands with seven chakras.

== Technique ==
At the core of the teaching of the technique is the establishment of an energetic circuit between the practitioner (server) and the client (servee). Practitioners seek to establish that circuit by the radiant extension of life energy through the dominant hand of the practitioner to the gland or organ of the client, and the receiving of life energy through the opposite hand from a corresponding contact point in the body.

Meeker taught that the first step in the Attunement process was the alignment of the cervical vertebrae by the radiation of healing energy through the hands on either side of the neck. Contemporary Attunement practitioners continue to teach attunement technique that begins and ends with an Attunement of the cervical vertebrae. Often, the cervical Attunement is followed by Attunement of the endocrine glands and some of the major organs of the body.

== Spiritual practice ==
As a spiritual practice, Attunement is intended to connect a person more closely to their spiritual source and to open the flow of life current. The practice includes conscious attention to the quality of spirit expressing through the practitioner in the daily living of life, and specific periods of meditation in the beginning and ending of each day, taught as Sanctification in the Evening and the Morning.

A central aspect of Attunement as a spiritual practice is referred to by Emissaries of Divine Light as spiritual centering, which they define as a daily practice of opening thoughts and emotions to the spiritual.
