= David Cecil (courtier) =

Welsh nobleman and politician

Sir Sir David Cecil JP
- Born: c. 1460
- Died: c. 1540
- Occupations: Landowner and courtier
- Title: Sir
- Spouses: Alice Dicons; Jane Roos
- Children: At least three, including Sir Richard Cecil
- Parent: Richard Cecil ap Philip Seisyll

Sir David Cecil, JP (c. 1460 – c. 1540) was a Welsh landowner, courtier, and member of parliament. He is noted as a paternal-line ancestor of the Cecil family which later attained prominence and rose to the peerage, including the extant marquessates of Exeter and Salisbury.

He was born into a Welsh family, the third son of Richard Cecil ap Philip Seisyllt of Alt-yr-Ynys on the border of Herefordshire and Monmouthshire, but settled near Stamford, Lincolnshire.

David Sitsylt of Alltyrynys was one of the many Welsh supporters of Henry Tudor, taking part in the latter's 1485 campaign which resulted in the victory at Bosworth, and Tudor becoming King Henry VII of England.

Cecil was an alderman of Stamford in 1504–1505, 1515–1516 and 1526–1527. He was made a Yeoman of the Chamber by 1506, a position he held for the rest of his life. He was elected as one of the Members of Parliament for Stamford in 1504, 1510, 1512, 1515 and 1523. He was a serjeant-at-arms from 1513 to his death and appointed justice of the peace (J.P.) for Rutland from 1532 and High Sheriff of Northamptonshire from June 1532 to November 1533.

He probably died in September 1540 and was buried in St George's Church, Stamford. He had married twice: firstly Alice, the daughter of John Dicons of Stamford, with whom he had two sons and secondly Jane, the daughter of Thomas Roos of Dowsby, Lincolnshire and widow of Edward Villers of Flore, Northamptonshire, with whom he had a daughter. He was succeeded by his son Richard.

== Sources ==
- "CECIL DAVID, (c.1460-?1540), of Stamford, Lincs". Hist of Parliament Online. Archived from the original on 2 March 2012.
- "The Family of David Seisyll".
