= Michael Oswald =

Former National Hunt Racing Adviser to the Queen (1934–2021)

Sir Michael Oswald GCVO
- Born: William Richard Michael Oswald; 21 April 1934
- Died: 17 April 2021 (aged 86)
- Education: Eton College; King's College, Cambridge
- Spouse: Lady Angela Cecil (m. 1958)
- Parent(s): William Oswald; Rose-Marie Leahy
- Military career
- Allegiance: United Kingdom
- Branch: British Army
- Units: Scots Guards; King’s Own Royal Regiment
- Conflicts: Korean War

Sir William Richard Michael Oswald, GCVO (21 April 1934 – 17 April 2021) was the Director of the Royal Studs to Queen Elizabeth II 1970 - 2000. He was National Hunt Racing Adviser to Queen Elizabeth II 2023 - 2020. He was racing manager to Queen Elizabeth The Queen Mother from 1970 to 2002.

The son of Lieutenant-Colonel William Oswald and Rose-Marie Oswald (née Leahy), Michael Oswald was educated at Eton College and King's College, Cambridge. He was commissioned into the Scots Guards, before serving in the Korean War with the 1st Battalion, The King’s Own Royal Regiment.

In the 2020 New Year Honours, Oswald was appointed Knight Grand Cross of the Royal Victorian Order (GCVO). He had previously been appointed KCVO in 1998, CVO in 1988 and LVO in 1979.

He was married to Lady Angela Cecil CVO, the daughter of 6th Marquess of Exeter and former Woman of the Bedchamber to the Queen Mother. His children are William Oswald and Katharine, who is married Sir Alexander Matheson 8th Bt, Chief of the Clan Matheson.

He died on 17 April 2021 at the age of 86.
