= Marquess of Exeter =

Title in the Peerage of the United Kingdom

Marquessate of Exeter
- Blazon Arms: On a chapeau gules, turned up ermine, a garb or, supported by two Lions, the dexter argent, and the sinister azure. Crest: On a chapeau gules, turned up ermine, a garb or, supported by two Lions, the dexter argent, and the sinister azure. Supporters: On either side a lion ermine.
- Creation date: 4 February 1801
- Creation: Second
- Created by: King George III
- Peerage: Peerage of the United Kingdom
- First holder: Henry Cecil, 10th Earl of Exeter
- Present holder: Michael Cecil, 8th Marquess of Exeter
- Heir apparent: Anthony Cecil, Baron Burghley
- Remainder to: The 1st Marquess's heirs male of the body lawfully begotten
- Subsidiary titles: Earl of Exeter; Baron Burghley
- Seat: Burghley House
- Motto: Cor unum via una (One heart, one way)

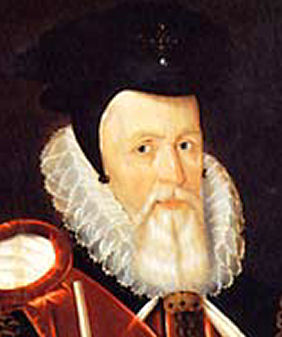
William Cecil, 1st Baron Burghley

Marquess of Exeter is a title that has been created twice, once in the peerage of England and once in the peerage of the United Kingdom. The first creation came in the peerage of England in 1525 for Henry Courtenay, 2nd Earl of Devon. For more information on this creation, which was forfeited in 1538, see Earl of Devon.

== History ==
The title is chiefly associated with the Cecil family, descended from the courtier Sir Richard Cecil of the parish of Stamford Baron St Martin in Northamptonshire. His only son, Sir William Cecil, was a prominent statesman and served as Secretary of State, Lord High Treasurer and Lord Privy Seal. In February 1571, he was created Baron Burghley, in the County of Northampton, in the Peerage of England. His son from his second marriage to Mildred Cooke, Sir Robert Cecil, was created Earl of Salisbury in 1605 and is the ancestor of the Marquesses of Salisbury. Lord Burghley was succeeded by his son from his first marriage to Mary Cheke, Thomas, the second Baron. He represented Stamford, Lincolnshire and Northamptonshire in the House of Commons, served as Lord Lieutenant of Yorkshire and as President of the Council of the North and was also a distinguished soldier. In 1605 Thomas Cecil was created Earl of Exeter in the Peerage of England (on the same day his half-brother was created Earl of Salisbury).

Thomas was succeeded by his eldest son William Cecil, the second Earl. He served as Lord Lieutenant of Northamptonshire. Lord Exeter married as his first wife Elizabeth, 16th Baroness de Ros. Their son William succeeded his mother in the barony at the age of one. However, he died childless during his father's lifetime (when the barony was inherited by his cousin Francis Manners, 6th Earl of Rutland). Lord Exeter had no other sons and was succeeded by his nephew, the third Earl. He was the son of Sir Richard Cecil, second son of the first Earl. He represented Peterborough in the Short Parliament. His son, the fourth Earl, was Lord Lieutenant of Northamptonshire. He was succeeded by his son, the fifth Earl. He sat as member of parliament for Northamptonshire.

His son, the sixth Earl, represented Rutland in Parliament and served as Lord Lieutenant of Rutland. His second son, the eighth Earl (who succeeded his elder brother), briefly represented Stamford in the House of Commons. His eldest son, the ninth Earl, was member of parliament for Rutland and also Lord Lieutenant of that county. He was childless and was succeeded by his nephew, the tenth Earl. He was the son of Thomas Chambers Cecil, second son of the eighth Earl.

=== Creation as Marquess ===
Lord Exeter represented Stamford in Parliament for sixteen years. In 1801 he was created Marquess of Exeter in the Peerage of the United Kingdom.

His son, the second Marquess, was a Tory politician and notably served as Lord Chamberlain of the Household and Lord Steward of the Household. He was succeeded by his son, the third Marquess. He was a Conservative politician and held office as Vice-Chamberlain of the Household and Captain of the Honourable Corps of Gentlemen-at-Arms. His eldest son, the fourth Marquess, represented Northamptonshire North in the House of Commons and served briefly as Vice-Chamberlain of the Household under his kinsman Lord Salisbury. He was succeeded by his son, the fifth Marquess. He was a Colonel in the Royal Field Artillery and served as Lord Lieutenant of Northamptonshire.

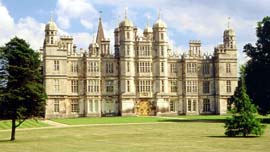
Burghley House, the ancestral seat of the Marquesses of Exeter

His eldest son, the sixth Marquess, was a Conservative politician and prominent athlete and sports official. He won the 400-metre hurdles at the 1928 Summer Olympics and was later President of the International Amateur Athletic Federation and vice-president of the International Olympic Committee. Lord Exeter also represented Peterborough in the House of Commons and served as Governor of Bermuda. He died without surviving male issue and was succeeded by his younger brother, the seventh Marquess. He was proprietor of a cattle ranch at 100 Mile House, British Columbia, in Canada. In 1954 he became head of the Emissaries of Divine Light, an obscure religious group. As of 2013 the titles are held by his only son, the eighth Marquess, who succeeded in 1988. He operates the ranch; from 1988 to 1996 he also headed the Emissaries of Divine Light.

Another member of the Cecil family was the naval commander Edward Cecil, 1st Viscount Wimbledon (a title which became extinct on his death in 1638). He was the third son of the first Earl of Exeter. Also, Lord William Cecil, third son of the third Marquess, married Mary, 2nd Baroness Amherst of Hackney. Their grandson William succeeded in the barony in 1919. Another member of this branch of the family is Vice-Admiral Sir Nigel Cecil. The champion racehorse trainer Sir Henry Cecil was the son of Henry Cecil, a younger brother of the third Baron. Lord John Joicey-Cecil, fourth son of the third Marquess, was Conservative Member of Parliament for Stamford.

The marquessate of Exeter is the senior marquessate in the Peerage of the United Kingdom. The Marquesses also hold the title of hereditary Grand Almoner and Lord Paramount of Peterborough.

The ancestral home of the Marquesses of Exeter is Burghley House, near Stamford, Lincolnshire; it is now run by a trust founded by the family. Former properties include Cecil House in London and Exeter House, Derby. The traditional burial place of the Cecils of Burghley House and the Marquesses of Exeter is the Burghley Chapel in St Martin's Church, Stamford.

== Marquess of Exeter, first creation (1525) ==
Arms of Henry Courtenay, 1st Marquess of Exeter (first creation): Quarterly, 1st: Royal arms of Edward IV, within a bordure counter-changed; 2nd & 3rd: Or, three torteaux gules (Courtenay); 4th: Or, a lion rampant azure (Redvers)

- Henry Courtenay, 1st Marquess of Exeter, 2nd Earl of Devon (attainted 1538, executed 1539); for his family, see Earl of Devon.

== Barons Burghley (1571) ==
- William Cecil, 1st Baron Burghley (1521–1598)
- Thomas Cecil, 2nd Baron Burghley (1542–1623) (created Earl of Exeter in 1605)

== Earls of Exeter (1605) ==
Other titles (1st Earl onwards): Baron Burghley (Eng 1571)

- Thomas Cecil, 1st Earl of Exeter (1542–1623)
- William Cecil, 2nd Earl of Exeter (1566–1640)
- David Cecil, 3rd Earl of Exeter (c. 1600–1643)
- John Cecil, 4th Earl of Exeter (1628–1678)
- John Cecil, 5th Earl of Exeter (c. 1648–1700)
- John Cecil, 6th Earl of Exeter (1674–1721)
- John Cecil, 7th Earl of Exeter (c. 1700–1722)
- Brownlow Cecil, 8th Earl of Exeter (1701–1754)
- Brownlow Cecil, 9th Earl of Exeter (1725–1793)
- Henry Cecil, 10th Earl of Exeter (1754–1804) (created Marquess of Exeter in 1801)

== Marquesses of Exeter, second creation (1801) ==
Other titles (1st Marquess onwards): Baron Burghley (Eng 1571), Earl of Exeter (Eng 1605)

- Henry Cecil, 1st Marquess of Exeter (1754–1804)
- Brownlow Cecil, 2nd Marquess of Exeter (1795–1867)
- William Alleyne Cecil, 3rd Marquess of Exeter (1825–1895)
- Brownlow Henry George Cecil, 4th Marquess of Exeter (1849–1898)
- William Thomas Brownlow Cecil, 5th Marquess of Exeter (1876–1956)
- David George Brownlow Cecil, 6th Marquess of Exeter (1905–1981)
- (William) Martin Alleyne Cecil, 7th Marquess of Exeter (1909–1988)
- (William) Michael Anthony Cecil, 8th Marquess of Exeter (b. 1935)

Notes:

- The heir apparent is the present holder's son Anthony John Cecil, Lord Burghley (b. 1970).
  - The heir apparent's heir presumptive is his fourth cousin (Hugh) William Amherst Cecil, 5th Baron Amherst of Hackney (b. 1968), who is descended from the third son of the third Marquess.
    - His heir is his only son Jack William Cecil (b. 2001)

== Family tree ==
Courtenay Family Tree, including: Earls of Devon (1st–4th creations), Courtenay Barons, Marquess of Exeter (1st creation), Viscount Courtenay, Courtenay Baronets of Powderham Castle

Richard de Redvers (d. 1107)
Earl of Devon (1st creation), probably in early 1141
Baldwin de Redvers (c. 1095–1155); Created 1141; 1st Earl of Devon
Richard de Redvers (d. 1162); 2nd Earl of Devon	William de Redvers (aka de Vernon) (d. 1217); 5th Earl of Devon	Renaud de Courtenay (d. 1194)
Baldwin de Redvers (d. 1188); 3rd Earl of Devon	Richard de Redvers (fl. c. 1066 d. 1234); 4th Earl of Devon	Baldwin de Redvers (d. 1216)	Mary de Vernon	Robert de Courtenay (d. 1242)
Baldwin de Redvers (1217–1245); 6th Earl of Devon	John de Courtenay (d. 1274)
Baldwin de Redvers (1236–1262); 7th Earl of Devon	Isabel de Redvers (1237–1293) suo jure 8th Countess of Devon	Hugh Courtenay (1249–1292)
Baron Courtenay, 1299; Earl of Devon (2nd creation or continuation of 1st creation), 1335
Hugh de Courtenay (1276–1340); 1st Baron Courtenay; 1st/9th Earl of Devon
Hugh de Courtenay (1303–1377); 2nd Baron Courtenay; 2nd/10th Earl of Devon
Hugh Courtenay (1327–1348)	Edward Courtenay of Godlington (c. 1331–1368/1371)	William Courtenay (c. 1342–1396); Archbishop of Canterbury	Philip Courtenay (c. 1355–1406)
Hugh Courtenay (c. 1345–1374); 3rd Baron Courtenay	Edward de Courtenay (1357–1419); 4th Baron Courtenay; 3rd/11th Earl of Devon	Hugh Courtenay	John Courtenay (d. before 1415)
Edward de Courtenay (c. 1385–1418); Styled Lord Courtenay	Hugh de Courtenay (1389–1422); 5th Baron Courtenay; 4th/12th Earl of Devon	Hugh Courtenay (d. 1471)	Philip Courtenay (1404–1463)
Thomas de Courtenay (1414–1458); 6th Baron Courtenay; 5th/13th Earl of Devon	Edward Courtenay (d. 1509); Created 1485; 1st Earl of Devon; Forfeit at his death by his son's attainder 1504	William Courtenay (d. 1485)
Thomas Courtenay (1432–1461); 7th Baron Courtenay; 6th/14th Earl of Devon	John Courtenay (1435–1471); Attaider of 1461 reversed Title restored 1470; 7th/15th Earl of Devon; Title in Abeyance 1471–1485; Attainder of 1461 re-invoked 1485, title forfeit	William Courtenay (d. 1511); Attainted 1504; Restored and Created 1511; 1st Earl of Devon	William Courtenay (d. 1512)
Earldom of Devon and Barony of Courtenay forfeit, 1461	Earldom of Devon forfeit, 1485
Marquess of Exeter, 1525
Henry Courtenay (1498–1538); 2nd Earl of Devon; Created 1525; 1st Marquess of Exeter; Attainted 1538; Titles forfeit	William Courtenay (1477–1535)
Marquessate of Exeter and Earldom of Devon forfeit, 1538
Earl of Devon, (2nd creation) 1553
Edward Courtenay (1527–1556); Created 1553; 1st Earl of Devon; Title granted with remainder to heirs male whatsoever Title Dormant until 1831	George Courtenay
William Courtenay (1529–1557) de jure 2nd Earl of Devon
William Courtenay (1543–1630) de jure 3rd Earl of Devon
William Courtenay (d. 1605)	Francis Courtenay de jure 4th Earl of Devon (c. 1576–1638)
William Courtenay (1628–1702); Created 1644; 1st Baronet of Powderham Castle de jure 5th Earl of Devon
Francis Courtenay (1650–1699)
William Courtenay (1675/6-1735); 2nd Baronet of Powderham Castle de jure 6th Earl of Devon
William Courtenay (1709–1762); 3rd Baronet of Powderham Castle; Created 1762; 1st Viscount Courtenay de jure 7th Earl of Devon	Henry Reginald Courtenay (1714–1763)
William Courtenay (1742–1788); 2nd Viscount Courtenay de jure 8th Earl of Devon	William Courtenay (1738–1783)	Henry Reginald Courtenay (1741–1803); Bishop of Exeter
William Courtenay (1768–1835); 3rd Viscount Courtenay; Claim established 1831 to Earldom; 9th Earl of Devon; Viscountcy Extinct	William Courtenay (1777–1859); 10th Earl of Devon
William Reginald Courtenay (1807–1888); 11th Earl of Devon	Henry Hugh Courtenay (1811–1904); 13th Earl of Devon	Thomas Peregrine Courtenay (1782–1841)
Edward Baldwin Courtenay (1836–1891); 12th Earl of Devon	Henry Reginald Courtenay (1850–1897); Styled Lord Courtenay
Charles Pepys Courtenay (1870–1927); 14th Earl of Devon	Henry Hugh Courtenay (1872–1935); 15th Earl of Devon	Frederick Leslie Courtenay (1875–1935); 16th Earl of Devon
Charles Christopher Courtenay (1916–1998); 17th Earl of Devon
Hugh Rupert Courtenay (1942–2015); 18th Earl of Devon
Charles Peregrine Courtenay (b. 1975); 19th Earl of Devon
Jack Haydon Langer Courtenay (b. 2009); Styled Lord Courtenay; Heir Apparent

Cecil family tree, including earls of Exeter and Salisbury (1605) and marquesses of Exeter (1801) and Salisbury

David Cecil c. 1460–c. 1540
Richard Cecil c. 1495–1553
Baron Burghley, 1571
William Cecil; 1520–1598; 1st Baron Burghley	Mildred Cooke; 1526–1589
Earl of Exeter, 1605	Baron Cecil, 1603; Viscount Cranborne, 1604; Earl of Salisbury (5th creation), 1605
Thomas Cecil; 1542–1623; 1st Earl of Exeter, 2nd Baron Burghley	Robert Cecil; 1563–1612; 1st Earl of Salisbury, etc.
Viscount Wimbledon and Baron Cecil of Putney, 1625
William Cecil; 1566–1600; 2nd Earl of Exeter, 3rd Baron Burghley	Richard Cecil; 1570–1633	Edward Cecil; 1572–1638; Viscount Wimbledon and Baron Cecil of Putney	Thomas Howard; 1561–1626; 1st Earl of Suffolk
Barony of Cecil of Putney and viscounty of Wimbledon extinct, 1638
David Cecil c. 1600–1643; 3rd Earl of Exeter, 4th Baron Burghley	William Cecil; 1591–1668; 2nd Earl of Salisbury, etc.	Catherine c. 1590–1673
John Cecil; 1628–1678; 4th Earl of Exeter, 5th Baron Burghley	Charles Cecil; 1619–1660 styled Viscount Cranborne	John Manners; 1604–1679; 8th Earl of Rutland
John Cecil c. 1648–1700; 5th Earl of Exeter, 6th Baron Burghley	James Cecil; 1648–1683; 3rd Earl of Salisbury, etc.	Margaret d. c. 1682
John Cecil; 1674–1721; 6th Earl of Exeter, 7th Baron Burghley	James Cecil; 1666–1694; 4th Earl of Salisbury, etc.	Thomas Tufton; 1644–1729; 6th Earl of Thanet
John Cecil c. 1700–1722; 7th Earl of Exeter, 8th Baron Burghley	Brownlow Cecil; 1701–1754; 8th Earl of Exeter, 9th Baron Burghley	James Cecil; 1691–1728; 5th Earl of Salisbury, etc.	Anne; 1693–1757
Brownlow Cecil; 1725–1793; 9th Earl of Exeter, 10th Baron Burghley	James Cecil; 1713–1780; 6th Earl of Salisbury, etc.	Wills Hill; 1718–1793; 1st Marquess of Downshire
Marquess of Exeter (2nd creation), 1801	Marquess of Salisbury, 1789
Henry Cecil; 1754–1804; 1st Marquess of Exeter, 10th Earl of Exeter, 11th Baron Burghley	James Cecil; 1743–1823; 1st Marquess of Salisbury, 7th Earl of Salisbury, etc.	Emily; 1750–1835
Brownlow Cecil; 1795–1867; 2nd Marquess of Exeter, 11th Earl of Exeter, 12th Baron Burghley	James Brownlow William Gascoyne-Cecil; 1791–1868; 2nd Marquess of Salisbury, 8th Earl of Salisbury, etc.
William Allen Cecil; 1825–1895; 3rd Marquess of Exeter, 12th Earl of Exeter, 13th Baron Burghley	James Emilius William Evelyn Gascoyne-Cecil; 1821–1865 styled Viscount Cranborne	Robert Arthur Talbot Gascoyne-Cecil; 1830–1903; 3rd Marquess of Salisbury, 9th Earl of Salisbury, etc.
Viscount Cecil of Chelwood, 1923
Brownlow Henry George Cecil; 1849–1898; 4th Marquess of Exeter, 13th Earl of Exeter, 14th Baron Burghley	Mary Rothes Margaret Cecil; 1857–1919; 2nd Baroness Amherst of Hackney	William Cecil; 1854–1943	James Edward Hubert Gascoyne-Cecil; 1861–1947; 4th Marquess of Salisbury, 10th Earl of Salisbury, etc.	Edgar Algernon Robert Gascoyne-Cecil; 1864–1958; Viscount Cecil of Chelwood
Viscounty of Cecil of Chelwood extinct, 1958
William Thomas Brownlow Cecil; 1876–1956; 5th Marquess of Exeter, 14th Earl of Exeter, 15th Baron Burghley	William Amherst Cecil; 1886–1914	Robert Arthur James Gascoyne-Cecil; 1893–1972; 5th Marquess of Salisbury, 11th Earl of Salisbury, etc.
David George Brownlow Cecil; 1905–1981; 6th Marquess of Exeter, 15th Earl of Exeter, 16th Baron Burghley	William Martin Alleyne Cecil; 1909–1988; 7th Marquess of Exeter, 16th Earl of Exeter, 17th Baron Burghley	William Alexander Evering Cecil; 1912–1980; 3rd Baron Amherst of Hackney	Robert Edward Peter Gascoyne-Cecil; 1916–2003; 6th Marquess of Salisbury, 12th Earl of Salisbury, etc.
William Michael Anthony Cecil b. 1935; 8th Marquess of Exeter, 17th Earl of Exeter, 18th Baron Burghley	William Hugh Amherst Cecil; 1940–2009; 4th Baron Amherst of Hackney	Robert Edward Peter Gascoyne-Cecil b. 1946; 7th Marquess of Salisbury, 13th Earl of Salisbury, etc.
Anthony Cecil b. 1970 styled Lord Burghley; Exeter heir apparent	Hugh William Amherst Cecil b. 1968; 5th Baron Amherst of Hackney; 2nd in line to Exeter	Robert Edward "Ned" William Gascoyne-Cecil b. 1970 styled Viscount Cranborne; Salisbury heir apparent	James Richard Gascoyne-Cecil b. 1976; 2nd in line to Salisbury

== Line of succession ==
Line of succession (simplified)
- William Cecil, 3rd Marquess of Exeter (1825–1895)
  - Brownlow Cecil, 4th Marquess of Exeter (1849–1898)
    - William Cecil, 5th Marquess of Exeter (1876–1956)
      - David Cecil, 6th Marquess of Exeter (1905–1981)
      - (William) Martin Cecil, 7th Marquess of Exeter (1909–1988)
        - (William) Michael Cecil, 8th Marquess of Exeter (born 1935)
          - (1). Anthony John Cecil, Lord Burghley (born 1970)
  - Lord William Cecil (1854–1943) m. Mary Cecil, 2nd Baroness Amherst of Hackney (1857–1919)
    - William Amherst Cecil (1886–1914)
      - William Cecil, 3rd Baron Amherst of Hackney (1912–1980)
        - William Cecil, 4th Baron Amherst of Hackney (1940–2009)
          - (2, 1). (Hugh) William Cecil, 5th Baron Amherst of Hackney (born 1968)
            - (3, 2).Jack William Amherst Cecil (born 2001)
        - (4, 3).Anthony Henry Amherst Cecil (born 1947)
          - (5, 4). Henry Edward Amherst Cecil (born 1976)
            - (6, 5). George William Amherst Cecil (born 2009)
          - (7, 6). Thomas Anthony Amherst Cecil (born 1981)
      - Henry Kerr Auchmuty Cecil (1914–1942)
        - male issue and descendants in remainder
          - Alexander James Amherst Burnett of Leys (b. 1973)
            - male issue in remainder
        - Henry Richard Amherst Cecil (1943–2013)
          - male issue and descendants in remainder
        - David Henry Amherst Cecil (1943–2000)
          - male issue and descendants in remainder
    - Thomas James Amherst Cecil (1887–1955)
      - Barclay James Amherst Cecil (1913–1987)
        - male issue and descendants in remainder
    - John Francis Amherst Cecil (1890–1954)
      - George Henry Vanderbilt Cecil (1925–2020)
        - male issue and descendants in remainder
      - William Amherst Vanderbilt Cecil (1928–2017)
        - male issue and descendants in remainder
    - Henry Mitford Amherst Cecil (1893–1962)
      - Sir Oswald Nigel Amherst Cecil (1925–2017)
        - male issue and descendants in remainder
  - Lord John Pakenham Joicey-Cecil (1867–1942)
    - Edward Wilfred George Joicey-Cecil (1912–1985)
      - male issue and descendants in remainder

== See also ==
- Viscount Wimbledon
- Marquess of Salisbury
- Baron de Ros
- Baron Rockley
- Viscount Cecil of Chelwood
- Baron Quickswood
- Baron Amherst of Hackney
