= Richard Cecil (courtier) =

English nobleman, politician and courtier

Sir Richard Cecil
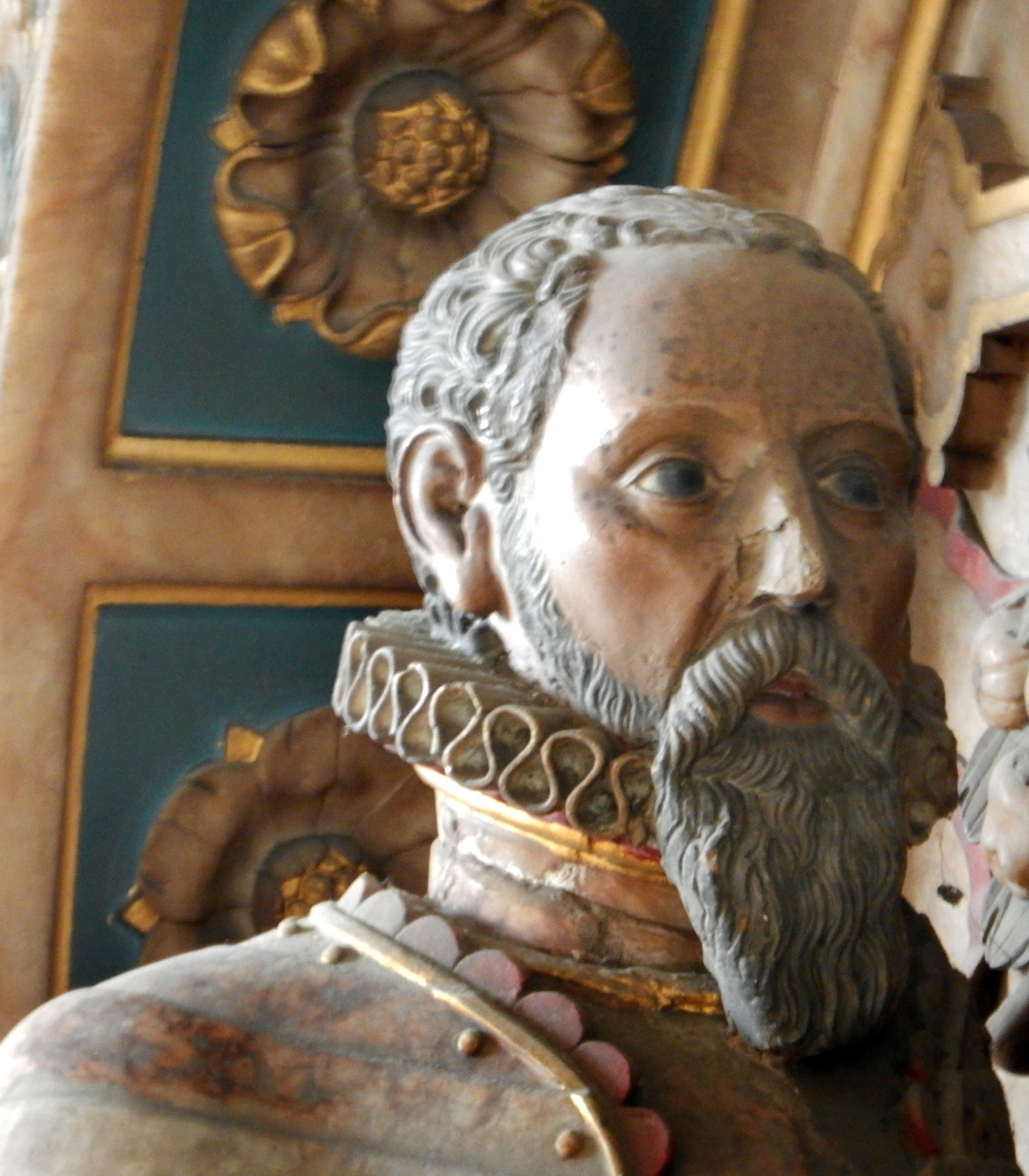
- Funerary effigy of Sir Richard Cecil
- Born: c. 1495
- Died: 19 March 1553
- Occupations: Politician and Courtier
- Spouse: Jane Heckington
- Children: 4 (including William Cecil, Lord Burghley)
- Parent(s): Sir David Cecil; Alice Dicons

Sir Richard Cecil (c. 1495 – 19 March 1553) was an English nobleman, politician, courtier, and Master of Burghley (Burleigh) in the parish of Stamford Baron, Northamptonshire. His father Sir David Cecil, of Welsh ancestry, rose in favour under King Henry VIII of England, becoming High Sheriff of Northamptonshire in 1532 and 1533, and died in 1541.

Richard too was a courtier. In 1517 he was a royal page; in 1520 he was present at the Field of the Cloth of Gold; he rose to be Groom of the Robes and constable of Warwick Castle. He was High Sheriff of Rutland in 1539, and was one of those who received no inconsiderable share of the plunder of the monasteries. He married Jane Heckington, daughter and heiress of William Heckington of Bourne, Lincolnshire. He had one son, William Cecil, Lord Burghley (1520–1598), and three daughters.

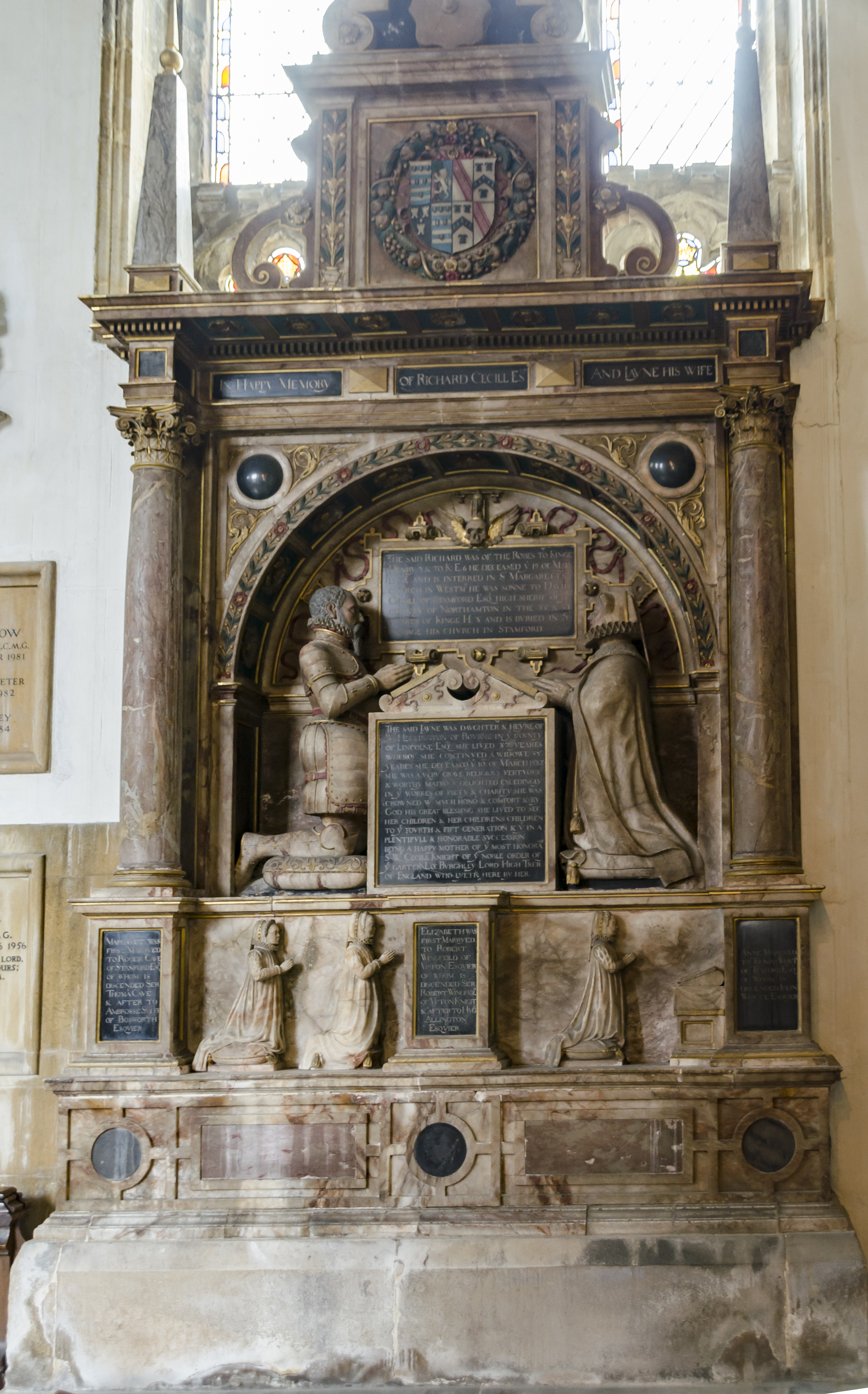
Tomb of Sir Richard Cecil in St Martin's Church, Stamford

When Richard died, he left an ample estate behind him in the counties of Rutland, Northamptonshire and elsewhere. He died at his house in Canon Row and was buried at St Margaret's, Westminster. Jane was a widow for 35 years dying 10 March 1587. Richard and Jane have a joint monument in St Martin's Church, Stamford.

== Family ==
He sent his son William to the grammar schools of Stamford and Grantham, and in 1535 William entered St John's College, Cambridge. Academically a success, William ran foul of his father, when his heart was lost to Mary Cheke, daughter of a local widow, with only a fortune of 40 pounds to recommend her. William was immediately removed before he could take his degree, and was entered as a student at Gray's Inn in 1541. If the motive was to prevent a marriage, it failed. Two months after he came up to London, William married Mary, probably secretly. Thomas, the future Earl of Exeter and only fruit of this union was born at Cambridge on 5 May 1542, therefore presumably at his grandmother's house. The marriage was so distasteful to Richard, that he is said to have altered his will, or at any rate, to have intended to do so. But the young wife did not live long, dying on 22 February 1544.

Of his daughters, Anne (also called Agnes) married Thomas White of Tuxford, Notts.; Margaret married Roger Cave (see Cave-Browne-Cave baronets), nephew of Sir Ambrose Cave, and secondly Ambrose Smythe of Husbands Bosworth, co Leic; and Elizabeth married Robert Wingfield and secondly Hugh Alington.
