= William Cecil, 5th Marquess of Exeter =

British peer

The Most Honourable The Marquess of Exeter KG, CMG, TD
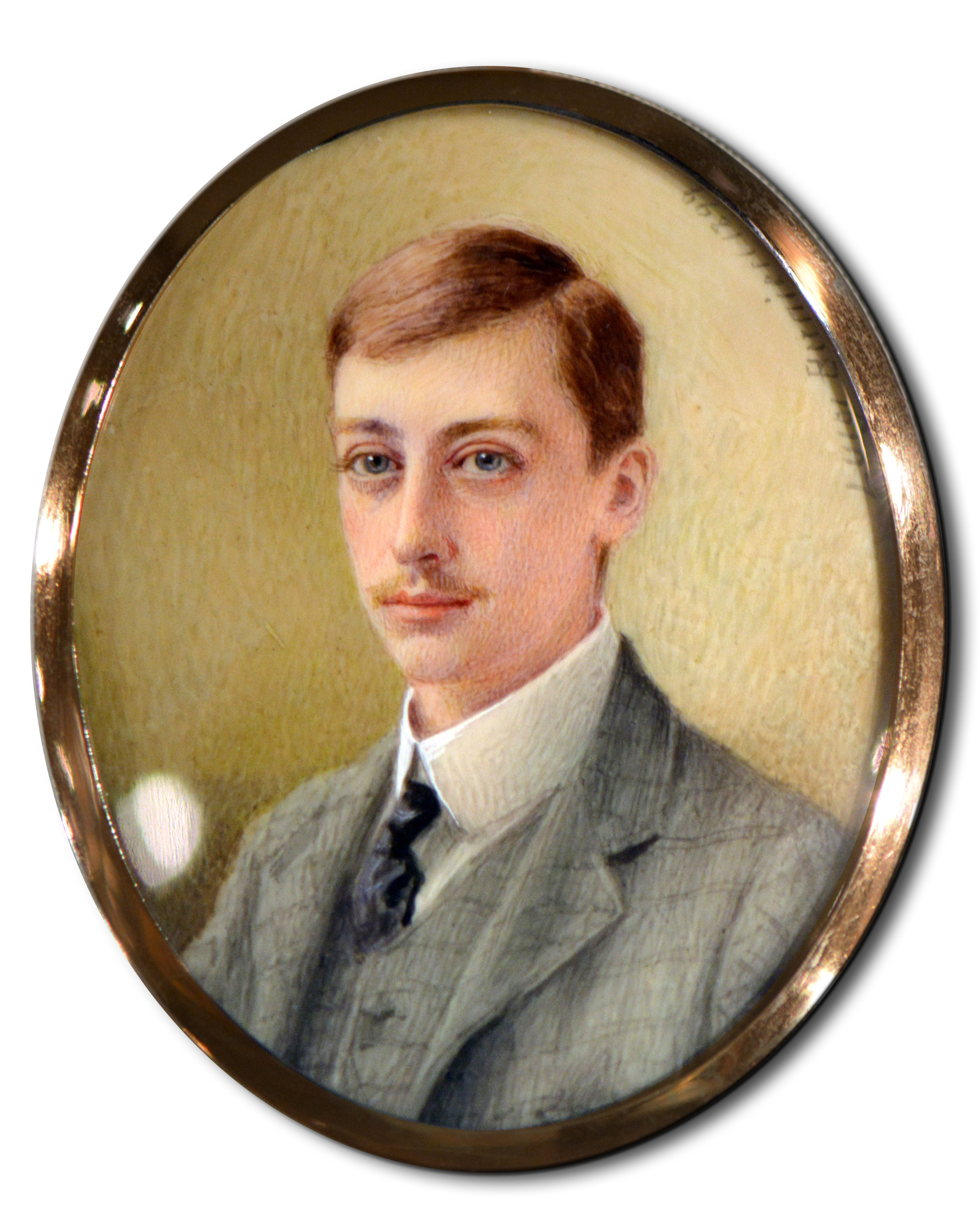
- Monarch: Queen Victoria

Personal details
- Born: 27 October 1876
- Died: 6 August 1956 (aged 79)
- Spouse: Hon. Myra Orde-Powlett (m. 1901)
- Children: Letitia Hotham, Baroness Hotham; David Cecil, 6th Marquess of Exeter; William Cecil, 7th Marquess of Exeter; Lady Romayne Brassey
- Parent(s): Brownlow Cecil, 4th Marquess of Exeter; Isabella Whichcote
- Education: Eton; Magdalene College, Cambridge

William Thomas Brownlow Cecil, 5th Marquess of Exeter (27 October 1876 – 6 August 1956), known as Lord Burghley from 1895 to 1898, was a British peer.

Exeter was the son of Brownlow Cecil, 4th Marquess of Exeter, and his wife, the former Isabella Whichcote. He was educated at Eton and Magdalene College, Cambridge. He succeeded as 5th Marquess on the death of his father on 9 April 1898.

== Military career ==
Lord Burghley joined the part-time 3rd (Northampton and Rutland Militia) Battalion, Northamptonshire Regiment (commanded by his father) as a Lieutenant on 24 July 1895. He was promoted to Captain on 22 March 1899. During the Second Boer War the battalion was embodied for home service on 4 January 1900 and he went with it to Barossa Barracks at Aldershot as a supernumerary captain. While there he acted temporarily as aide-de-camp to Major-General John Edward Boyes, with the 7th Brigade. In March the battalion moved to Verne Citadel, Portland, but Exeter resigned his commission on grounds of ill-health on 29 August 1900.

In May 1910 he was appointed officer commanding of the Northamptonshire Battery, Royal Field Artillery, with the rank of Major. This unit had been formed from the Peterborough companies of the 1st Volunteer Battalion, Northamptonshire Regiment, following the creation of the Territorial Force (TF) in 1908. It formed part of IV East Anglian Brigade, RFA, and Exeter was promoted to Lieutenant-Colonel commanding this brigade on 21 January 1914.

On the outbreak of World War I in August 1914 the brigade was undergoing annual training at Redesdale in Northumberland with the rest of the TF's East Anglian Division (later 54th (East Anglian) Division). They immediately mobilised and served in coast defence until May 1915. When the rest of 54th (EA Division) embarked for the Gallipoli Campaign the artillery remained behind and continued training before going overseas in November. After a brief stay in France, the divisional artillery rejoined 54th (EA) Division in Egypt and went into the Suez Canal defences until January 1917, when they prepared to advance into Sinai.

At this point Lord Exeter was transferred to command XIX Brigade, Royal Horse Artillery, in the Imperial Mounted Division that was being formed. Since a mounted division only had one artillery brigade, he also held the post of Commander, Royal Artillery (CRA) for the division. The Imperial Mounted Division (Australian Mounted Division from June 1917) served through the Palestine Campaign, at the First, Second and Third Battles of Gaza, the defence of Jerusalem after its capture, the Second Trans-Jordan Raid, and the final offensive, including the capture of Damascus. The Marquess of Exeter was twice mentioned in despatches for his services during the war, was promoted to Colonel and awarded a Companionship of the Order of St Michael and St George (CMG).

After the war he remained in the Territorial Army (TA) until he retired in 1933, and served as president of the Northamptonshire TA Association until 1951. He was awarded the Territorial Decoration (TD) and was ADC to King George V 1920–31.

== Civil career ==
The Marquess of Exeter was the Hereditary Grand Almoner of the United Kingdom. He was a Justice of the Peace and served as Mayor of Stamford 1909–10, chairman of the Soke of Peterborough County Council 1910–43 (president of the County Councils Association 1943). He was Lord Lieutenant of Northamptonshire 1922–51. He was made a Knight of the Garter in 1937, and was also a Knight of St John.

== Family ==
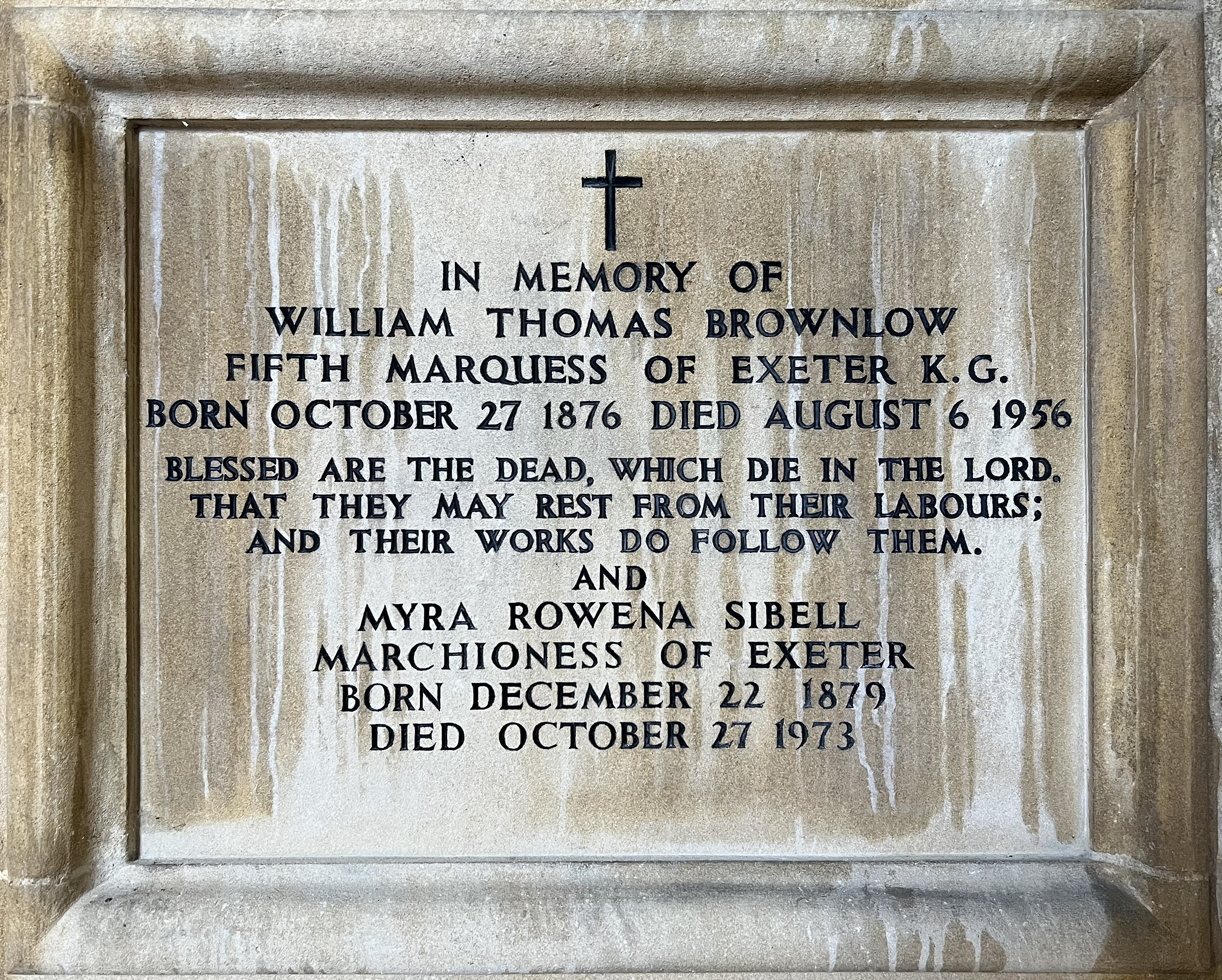
Memorial in St Martin's Church, Stamford

Lord Exeter married Hon. Myra Orde-Powlett, daughter of William Orde-Powlett, 4th Baron Bolton, on 16 April 1901.
They had four children:

- Lady Letitia Sibell Winifred Brownlow-Cecil (b. 20 November 1903- d. 21 July 1992 Dalton Holme, Yorkshire, ENG), married Henry Hotham, 7th Baron Hotham and had issue.
- David George Brownlow Cecil, 6th Marquess of Exeter (1905–1981)
- William Martin Alleyne Brownlowe Cecil, 7th Marquess of Exeter (1909–1988)
- Lady Romayne Elizabeth Algitha Brownlow-Cecil (22 March 1915– d. 27 June 2001 Stamford, Lincolnshire, ENG), married Major Hon. Peter Brassey, son of Henry Brassey, 1st Baron Brassey and had issue.

== Arms ==
Coat of arms of William Cecil, 5th Marquess of Exeter
| Crest On a chapeau gules, turned up ermine, a garb or, supported by two Lions, the dexter argent, and the sinister azure. Escutcheon Barry of ten argent and azure over all six escutcheons sable, three, two, and one, each charged with a lion rampant of the first. Supporters On either side a lion ermine. Motto Cor unum via una (One heart, one way). Orders The Most Noble Order of the Garter - Knight Companion (KG). |

== See also ==
- Burghley House
- Brownlow Cecil, 4th Marquess of Exeter

== Notes ==
Honorary titles
| Preceded by The Earl Spencer | Lord Lieutenant of Northamptonshire; 1922–1952 | Succeeded by The Earl Spencer |
Peerage of the United Kingdom
| Preceded by Brownlow Cecil | Marquess of Exeter; 1898–1956 | Succeeded by David Cecil |
