= David Cecil, 6th Marquess of Exeter =

English athlete and sports official (1905–81)

The Most Honourable The Marquess of Exeter KCMG KStJ
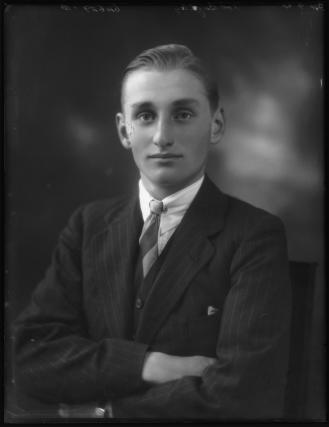
- Burghley in 1924

Personal information
- Full name: David George Brownlow Cecil, 6th Marquess of Exeter
- Nationality: British
- Born: 9 February 1905 Burghley House, England
- Died: 21 October 1981 (aged 76) London, England
- Height: 5 ft 10 in (178 cm)
- Weight: 10 st 10 lb (150 lb; 68 kg)

Sport
- Sport: Athletics
- Event: Hurdles
- Club: University of Cambridge AC; Achilles Club

Achievements and titles
- Personal bests: 110 mH: 14.5 (1930); 400 mH: 52.01 (1932); 400 m: 49.7 (1929)
Medal record
Representing Great Britain
Olympic Games
Gold medal – first place	1928 Amsterdam	400 m hurdles
Silver medal – second place	1932 Los Angeles	4 × 400 m relay
Representing England
British Empire Games
Gold medal – first place	1930 Hamilton	120 yd hurdles
Gold medal – first place	1930 Hamilton	440 yd hurdles
Gold medal – first place	1930 Hamilton	4 × 440 yd relay

David George Brownlow Cecil, 6th Marquess of Exeter, KCMG, KStJ (9 February 1905 – 21 October 1981), styled Lord Burghley from birth until 1956 and also known as David Burghley, was an English athlete, sports official, peer, and Conservative Party politician. He won the gold medal in the 400 m hurdles at the 1928 Summer Olympics.

== Early life ==
Born near Stamford, Lincolnshire, as heir to the 5th Marquess of Exeter, Lord Burghley was educated at Institut Le Rosey in Switzerland, Ludgrove School, Eton College and Magdalene College, Cambridge. At Cambridge, he was president of the Cambridge University Athletics Club and a member of the Pitt Club.

== Athlete ==
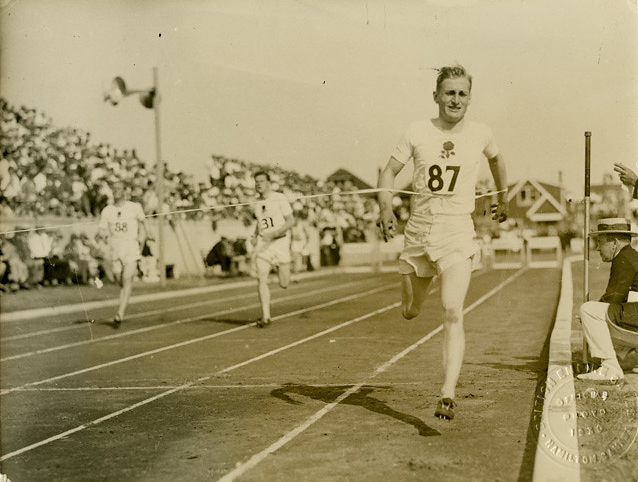
Lord Burghley wins the 440 yards hurdles at the 1930 British Empire Games

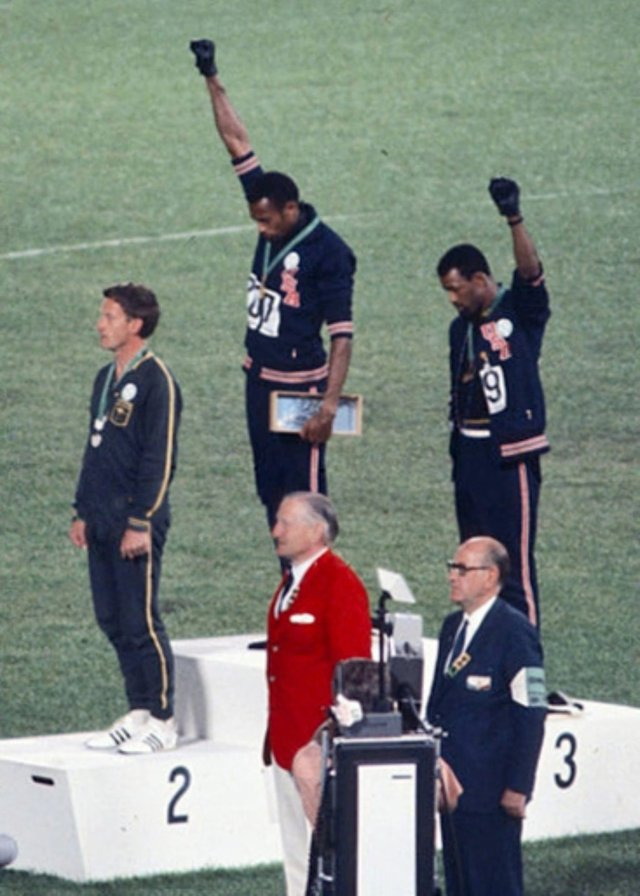
The Marquess of Exeter (in red blazer) in the foreground after presenting the medals for the 200 metres at the 1968 Summer Olympics

A notable runner at school and at Cambridge, he continued with his athletics and won the British AAA championships in 120 yd from 1929 to 1931 and the 440 yd (400 m) hurdles from 1926 to 1928, and again in 1930 and 1932.

Burghley made his Olympic debut in Paris in 1924, when he was eliminated in the first round of the 110 metre hurdles event. At the 1928 Summer Olympics, Burghley was eliminated in the semifinal of the 110 metre hurdles competition, but won the 400 metres hurdles, beating second and third placed Americans Frank Cuhel and Morgan Taylor by 0.2 seconds. At the first Commonwealth Games in 1930, Burghley won both hurdling events and was also a member of the gold medal winning British 4 × 440 yards relay team. In 1927–1930 Burghley also set several British records, one of which, 24.7 s in the 220 yard hurdles, set in 1927, stood until 1950.

In 1931 Burghley was elected as Member of Parliament (MP) for Peterborough. He was granted a leave of absence to compete in the 1932 Summer Olympics, where he placed fourth in the 400 m hurdles event, fifth in the 110 m hurdles competition, and won a silver medal as a member of the British 4 × 400 metres relay team, which set a new European record in the process.

In 1933, Burghley became a member of the International Olympic Committee (IOC). Three years later he was elected President of the Amateur Athletic Association and Chairman of the British Olympic Association. In 1946 he became President of the International Amateur Athletic Federation (IAAF) and later acted as Chairman of the Organizing Committee for the 1948 Summer Olympics. Between 1952 and 1966 he was vice-president of the IOC and was a presidential candidate in 1952 and 1964.

As an IOC member and president of the IAAF, Burghley presented the medals for the 200 m at the Mexico Olympics in 1968 and appeared in some famous images of the Black Power salute given by Tommie Smith and John Carlos. When later asked what he had thought of the gloves, he said: "I thought they had hurt their hand."

== Politician ==
Burghley was a member of the Conservative and Unionist Party and served as MP for Peterborough from 1931 until 1943. He was elected in the 1931 general election, defeating the sitting Labour MP J. F. Horrabin. Burghley was returned to the House of Commons in the 1935 general election. He was for many years Chairman of the Junior Imperial League. Burghley resigned his Commons seat in 1943 to take up appointment as Governor of Bermuda, a post in which he served until 1945.

== Family ==
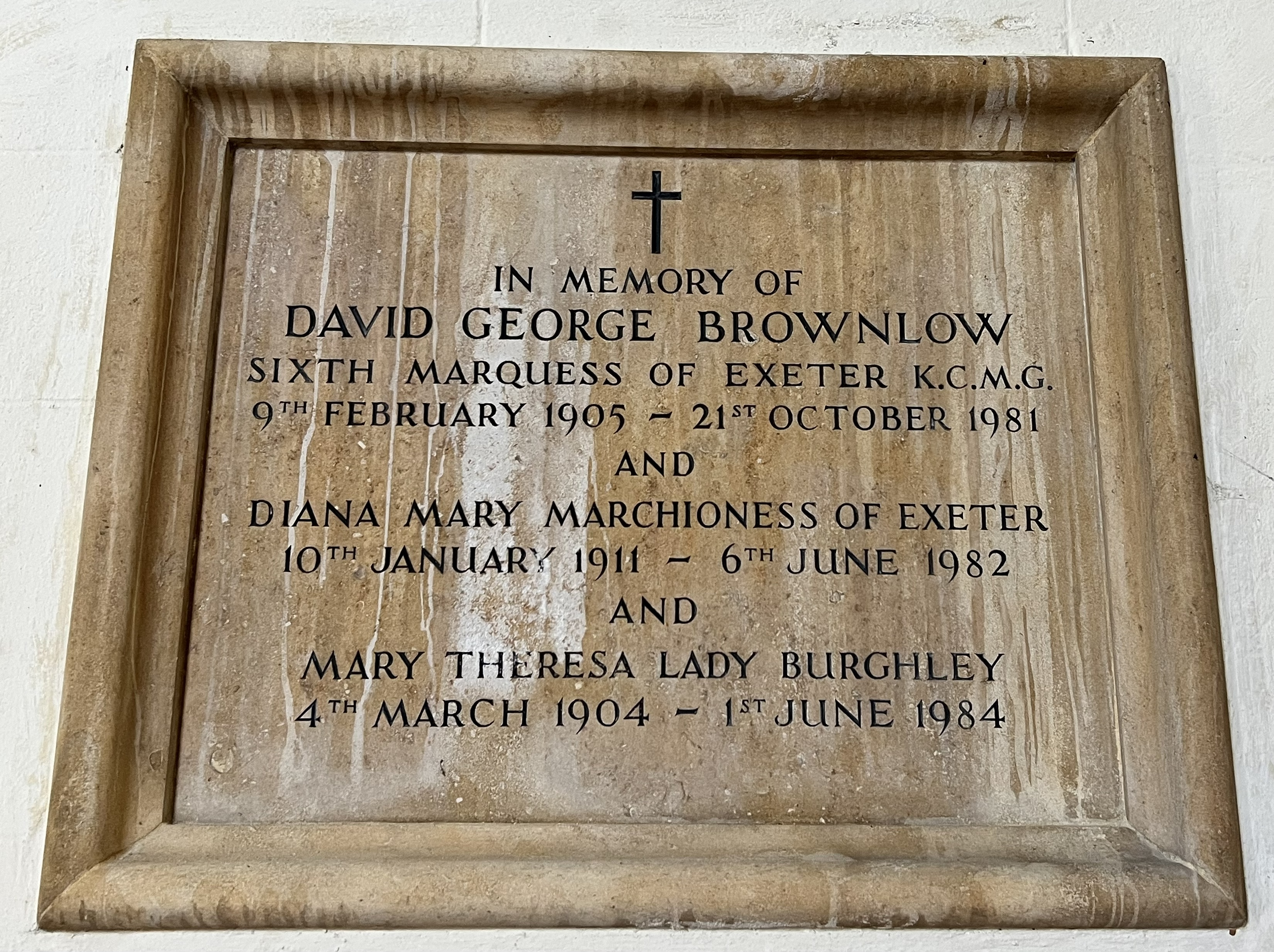
Memorial in St Martin's Church, Stamford

The Marquess of Exeter was a descendant of William Cecil, 1st Baron Burghley, chief minister and, later, treasurer to Queen Elizabeth I. On his death the title passed to his brother, Lord Martin Cecil.

Lord Burghley married firstly on 10 January 1929, his second cousin, Lady Mary Theresa Montagu Douglas Scott (4 March 1904 – 1 June 1984), fourth daughter of John Montagu Douglas Scott, 7th Duke of Buccleuch & 9th Duke of Queensberry, and Lady Margaret Alice Bridgeman. They were cousins through their common descent from Richard Lumley, 9th Earl of Scarbrough. They had four children before divorcing in 1946:

- Lady Davina Mary Cecil (29 June 1931 – 6 September 2018), married John Vane, 11th Baron Barnard on 8 October 1952. They divorced in 1993.
- Hon. John William Edward Cecil (1 June 1933 – 6 Jul 1934).
- Lady Gillian Moyra Katherine Cecil (8 March 1935 - 17 June 2022), married Sir Giles Henry Charles Floyd, 7th Baronet on 23 November 1954. They divorced in 1978.
- Lady Angela Mary Rose Cecil (born 21 May 1938), CVO and former Woman of the Bedchamber to Queen Elizabeth The Queen Mother; married Sir William Richard Michael Oswald on 21 April 1958.

He married secondly on 12 December 1946, Diana Mary Henderson (10 January 1911 – 6 June 1982), granddaughter of Alexander Henderson, 1st Baron Faringdon, and widow of Lt.-Col. David Walter Arthur William Forbes. They had one daughter:

- Lady Victoria Diana Cecil (born 28 June 1947), married Simon Patrick Leatham on 25 April 1967.

== Great Court Run ==
In June 1927, in his final year at Magdalene College, Cambridge, Burghley sprinted around Great Court at Trinity College at midnight in the time it took the college clock to toll 12 o'clock. This inspired the scene in the film Chariots of Fire in which Harold Abrahams accomplishes the same feat. The character Lord Andrew Lindsay in Chariots of Fire, played by Nigel Havers, is based upon Burghley, but he did not allow his name to be used because of the inaccurate historical depiction in the film. There was never a race in which Abrahams beat Burghley in this feat as the film suggests; in fact, Abrahams never attempted the Great Court Run.

Burghley was the first to run the 367 metres (401 yards) around the court in the 43.6 seconds that it takes the clock to strike 12 o'clock. Known as the Great Court Run, students traditionally attempted to complete the circuit on the night of the Matriculation Dinner; in modern times the run is attempted at noon.

== Arms ==
Coat of arms of David Cecil, 6th Marquess of Exeter
Crest On a chapeau gules, turned up ermine, a garb or, supported by two Lions, the dexter argent, and the sinister azure. Escutcheon Barry of ten argent and azure over all six escutcheons sable, three, two, and one, each charged with a lion rampant of the first. Supporters On either side a lion ermine. Motto Cor unum via una (One heart, one way). Orders The Most Distinguished Order of St Michael and St George - Knight Commander (KCMG)

Sporting positions
Preceded by (Sweden) J. Sigfrid Edström	Presidents of the IAAF; 1946–1976	Succeeded by (Netherlands) Adriaan Paulen
Preceded by (Nazi Germany) Joseph Goebbels; Karl Ritter von Halt	President of Organizing Committee for Summer Olympic Games; 1948	Succeeded by (Finland) Ilmari Salminen
Parliament of the United Kingdom
Preceded by James Horrabin	Member of Parliament for Peterborough; 1931–1943	Succeeded by Viscount Suirdale
Government offices
Preceded by Viscount Knollys	Governor of Bermuda; 1943–1945	Succeeded by Admiral Sir Ralph Leatham
Academic offices
Preceded by George Cunningham	Rector of the University of St Andrews; 1949–1952	Succeeded by The Earl of Crawford
Peerage of the United Kingdom
Preceded by William Cecil	Marquess of Exeter; 1956–1981	Succeeded by William Cecil
