= Flitteriss Park =

Ancient deer park in Leicestershire and Rutland, England

Coordinates: 52°39′48″N 0°46′58″W

Flitteriss Park is an ancient deer park in the English Midland counties of Leicestershire and Rutland west of Oakham. It is a modern livestock farm today but has a rich history.

== History ==
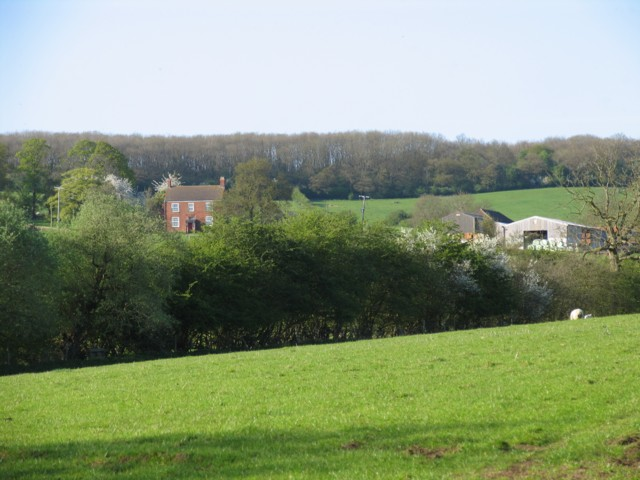
Flitteriss Park Farm

Flitteriss Park was enclosed by royal grant as a Medieval deer park and royal hunting ground in 1250. Henry III granted Richard, 1st Earl of Cornwall the right to enclose the park with a ditch and hedge. This was to be enclosed within the Royal forest of Leighfield. However, an inquest two years later found that "the wood is outside the said forest bordering the county of Leicester" The park remained with the Earl and formed part of his Dower to the family of Isabel Marshal, his wife. Thereafter a succession of absent landlords made illegal hunting a rife practice in the park. In 1372, William Flore was paid to provide a palisade for the park. The same Flore's House still exists today in Oakham. In 1373 the first mention is made of a hunting lodge at Flitteriss. The problem of absentee landlords was in part down to the fact that the park was stated to be held by the castle and manor of Oakham, but since the boundary territory was disputed, little care was taken with the parkland. By the end of the fourteenth century, the park was still maintained as a royal hunting park and the last record of such is in 1459 when Humphrey Stafford, 1st Duke of Buckingham used this and one other nearby park. The park however remained in the ownership of the Marshal family.

The park was passed to the Noel family in the early part of the sixteenth century through marriage. It remained within the Noel line until the last Noel resident, Charles Noel, 2nd Earl of Gainsborough.

The orchard at Flitteriss was established in 1530 according to Squires. There are examples of Quercus petraea and Juglans regia of a great age. There is also an ancient Fagus sylvatica with evidence of carvings.

The hunting lodge remained intact for 550 years until it crumbled in 1920 and today only patchy ruins exist where it once stood. Original farm buildings still stand to the east of the existing farm. The stone used for construction was quarried on site. The remains of the house was used to build a house in the nearby village of Knossington.

Today the Park is permanent pasture farmland and little wooded area remains between the ancient woodlands of Ladywood and Cold Overton Park.

== County high point ==
The highest point in Rutland is within the historic park, southwest of Glebe Farm radio mast, at 197 m (646 ft) above sea level, and topped with a trig point. Grid Reference: SK8271708539

== Notable residents ==
- Richard, 1st Earl of Cornwall
- Isabel Marshal
- Charles Noel, 2nd Earl of Gainsborough

== Other Examples ==
Flitteriss Park lends its name to a pedigree racehorse, winning many UK and US races.
