= List of birds of Leicestershire and Rutland =

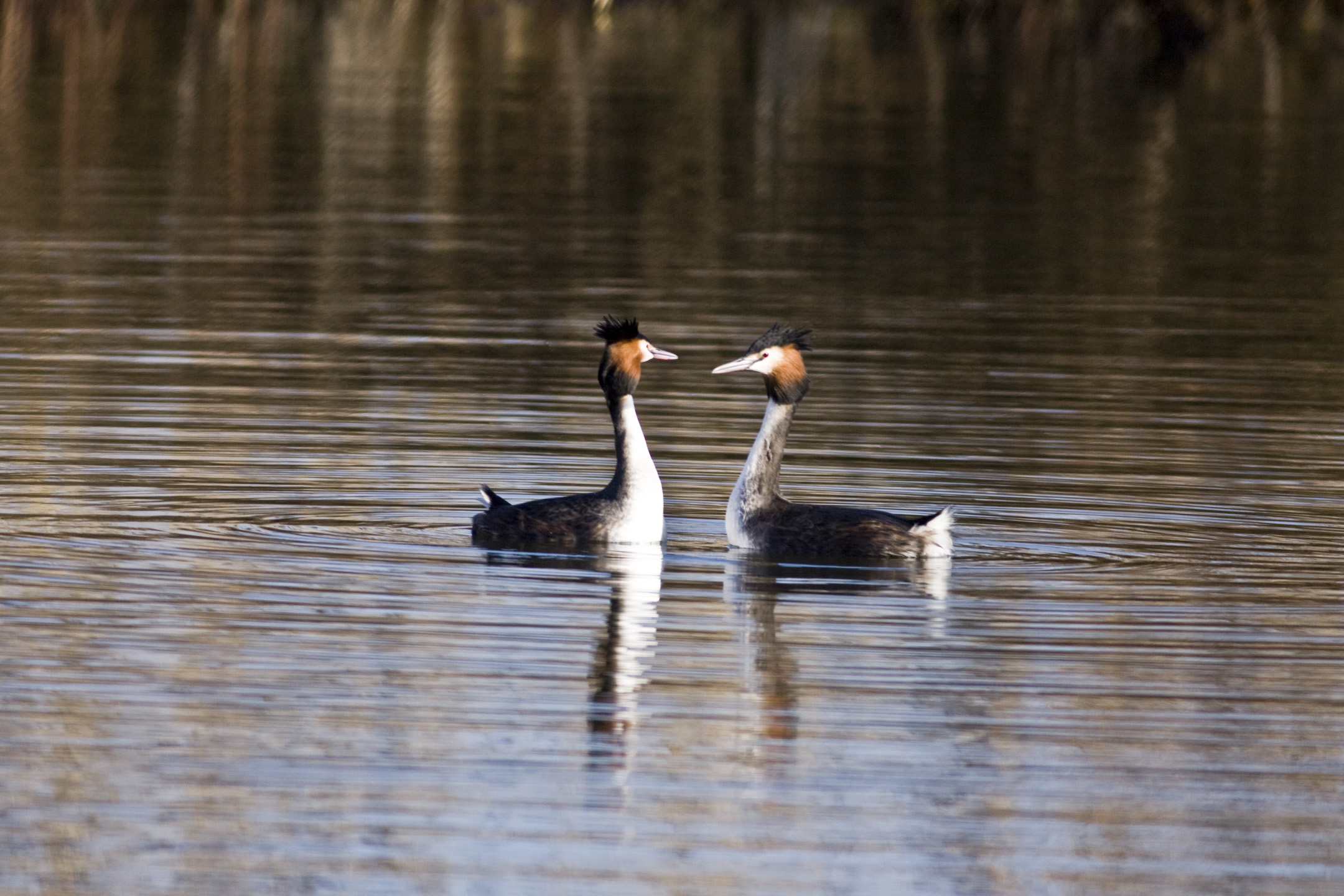
Two great crested grebes swimming on Rutland Water. A great crested grebe is the emblem of the Leicestershire and Rutland Ornithological Society (LROS).

Leicestershire and Rutland are neighbouring counties in the English Midlands. Rutland is the smallest county in England and its administration was amalgamated with its larger neighbour between 1974 and 1997. Since 1941, the two counties have shared a single bird-recording organisation, the Leicestershire and Rutland Ornithological Society (LROS).

Since 1 January 1941, the date of the foundation of the LROS, 290 bird species have been recorded in the counties in an apparently natural wild state at least once. A further nine were documented prior to that date, but have not been recorded subsequently. There are nine introduced species that maintain themselves without necessary recourse to further introduction. The total list for the LROS recording area is therefore 308 species.

Leicestershire and Rutland are landlocked lowland counties and most of the birds are typical of English farmland habitat. Many coastal, oceanic and highland birds are absent or rare, and there are few rare vagrants compared to coastal areas. The construction of two large reservoirs, Eyebrook Reservoir in 1940 and Rutland Water (England's largest reservoir) in 1976, has provided freshwater environments enabling many aquatic birds to thrive.

The list below is based on the LROS checklist, using BOU species names, and the status descriptors in the accounts have the following meanings:

- Very rare: fewer than ten records ever
- Rare: more than ten records ever, but less than annual
- Scarce: fewer than ten birds occurring or pairs breeding annually
- Uncommon: 10–100 birds occurring or pairs breeding annually
- Fairly common: 100–1,000 birds occurring or pairs breeding annually
- Common: 1,000–10,000 birds occurring or pairs breeding annually
- Abundant: more than 10,000 birds occurring or pairs breeding annually

In the list below, "BBRC" means that a full description of nationally rare species is required for acceptance of the record by the British Birds Rarities Committee, and "LROS" indicates that a description of county rarities is required for acceptance of the record by the LROS Records Committee. Photographs of birds illustrating the list are not all taken within the locality.

== Ducks, geese and swans ==
Order: Anseriformes Family: Anatidae

The swans, ducks and geese are medium to large birds that are adapted to an aquatic existence with webbed feet and bills which are flattened to a greater or lesser extent. In many ducks the male is colourful while the female is dull brown. The diet consists of a variety of animals and plants. The family is well represented in the counties, especially in winter when large numbers visit from further north.

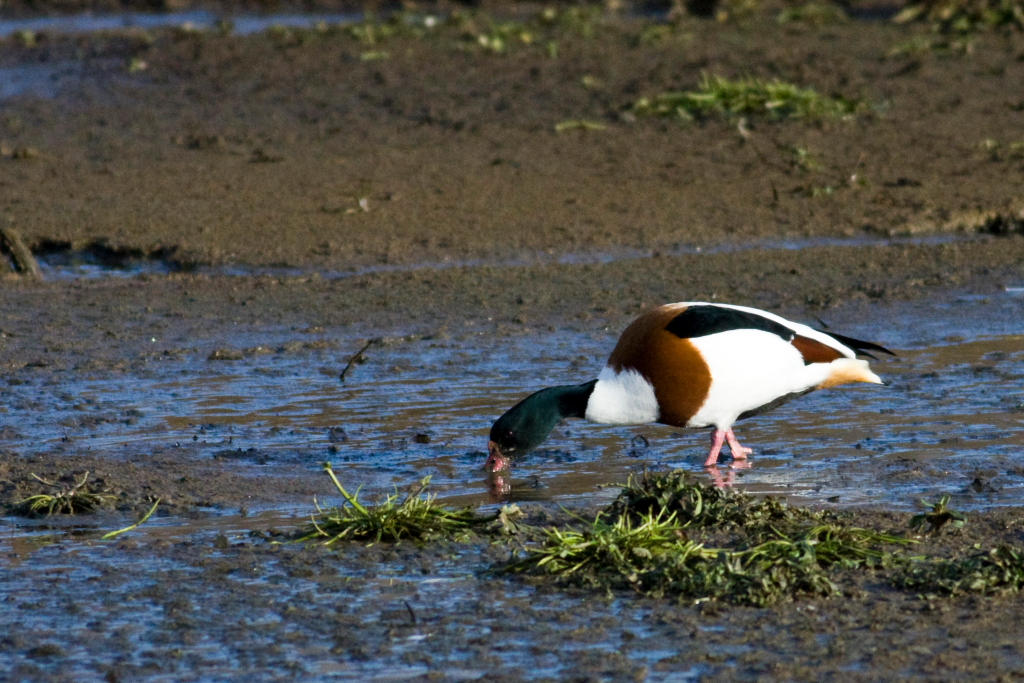
Common shelduck foraging in the mud around frozen-over Rutland Water in winter.

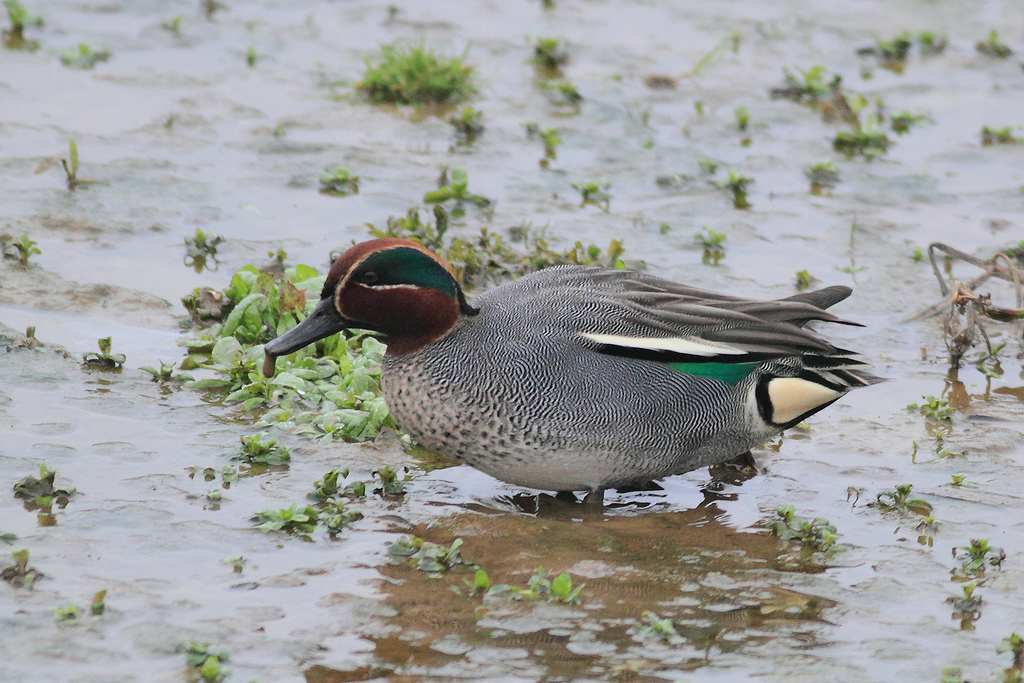
A male Eurasian teal at Rutland Water

Common name	Binomial	Status
Mute swan	Cygnus olor	Fairly common resident; uncommon to fairly common breeding
Bewick's swan	Cygnus columbianus	Uncommon in winter and on passage
Whooper swan	Cygnus cygnus	Scarce in winter and on passage
Bean goose	Anser fabalis	Rare in winter, LROS
Pink-footed goose	Anser brachyrhynchus	Scarce in winter and uncommon on passage
White-fronted goose	Anser albifrons	Scarce to uncommon in winter, mainly escapes
Greylag goose	Anser anser	Fairly common feral resident; uncommon breeding
Canada goose	Branta canadensis	Introduced common resident; fairly common breeding
Barnacle goose	Branta leucopsis	Rare in winter, uncommon feral resident
Brent goose	Branta bernicla	Scarce in winter and uncommon on passage
Egyptian goose	Alopochen aegyptiaca	Introduced. Uncommon resident, scarce breeding
Ruddy shelduck	Tadorna ferruginea	Rare vagrant or escapee
Common shelduck	Tadorna tadorna	Uncommon in winter and on passage, scarce breeding
Mandarin duck	Aix galericulata	Introduced. Uncommon resident, scarce breeding
Eurasian wigeon	Anas penelope	Common in winter and on passage, scarce in summer
American wigeon	Anas americana	Very rare, LROS
Gadwall	Anas strepera	Common in winter and on passage, uncommon breeding
Eurasian teal	Anas crecca	Common in winter and on passage, uncommon breeding
Green-winged teal	Anas carolinensis	Very rare, LROS
Mallard	Anas platyrhynchos	Common in winter and on passage, fairly common breeding
Northern pintail	Anas acuta	Uncommon to fairly common in winter and on passage
Garganey	Anas querquedula	Scarce to uncommon on passage; very rare breeding
Blue-winged teal	Anas discors	Very rare, BBRC
Northern shoveler	Anas clypeata	Fairly common in winter; rare-scarce breeding
Red-crested pochard	Netta rufina	Scarce in winter and on passage
Common pochard	Aythya ferina	Fairly common to common, rare breeding
Redhead	Aythya americana	Very rare, BBRC
Ring-necked duck	Aythya collaris	Very rare, LROS
Ferruginous duck	Aythya nyroca	Rare in winter and on passage, LROS
Tufted duck	Aythya fuligula	Common in winter and on passage, uncommon breeding
Greater scaup	Aythya marila	Uncommon in winter and on passage
Lesser scaup	Aythya affinis	Very rare, BBRC
Common eider	Somateria mollissima	Rare in winter and on passage, LROS
Long-tailed duck	Clangula hyemalis	Rare in winter
Common scoter	Melanitta nigra	Rare in winter and uncommon on passage
Velvet scoter	Melanitta fusca	Rare in winter and on passage, LROS
Surf scoter	Melanitta perspicillata	Very rare vagrant- one record 2016-2017 LROS
Common goldeneye	Bucephala clangula	Fairly common in winter and on passage, uncommon in summer
Smew	Mergellus albellus	Uncommon in winter
Red-breasted merganser	Mergus serrator	Scarce in winter and on passage
Goosander	Mergus merganser	Fairly common in winter and on passage
Ruddy duck	Oxyura jamaicensis	Introduced. Uncommon in winter, scarce breeding

== Grouse ==
Order: Galliformes Family: Tetraonidae

Grouse are sturdy, medium-sized terrestrial birds of the Northern Hemisphere. They have feathered feet and nostrils and short, rounded wings. They feed mainly on plant material and lay their eggs in a simple scrape on the ground. They are gamebirds and large numbers were shot in the past in moorland areas.

Common name	Binomial	Status
Red grouse	Lagopus lagopus	Extinct resident since about 1840
Eurasian black grouse	Tetrao tetrix	Extinct resident since about 1840

== Pheasants, partridges and quail ==
Order: Galliformes Family: Phasianidae

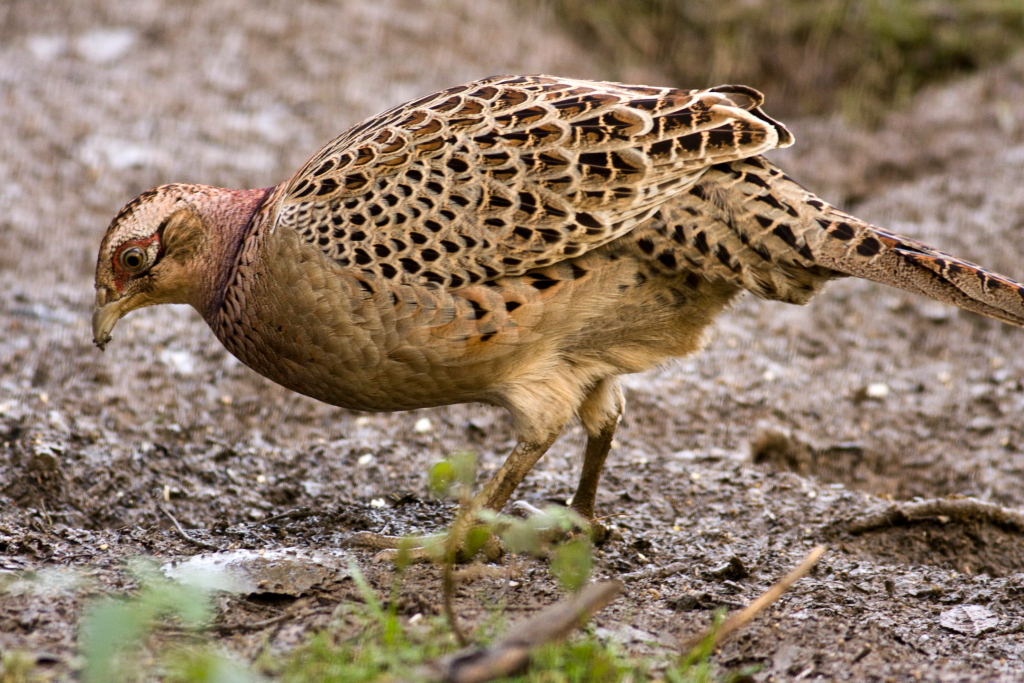
A female common pheasant near Rutland Water

Pheasants and allies are terrestrial species, feeding and nesting on the ground. They are variable in size but generally plump, with broad and relatively short wings.

Common name	Binomial	Status
Red-legged partridge	Alectoris rufa	Common introduced resident breeder
Grey partridge	Perdix perdix	Uncommon resident breeder
Common quail	Coturnix coturnix	Scarce summer visitor, breeds
Common pheasant	Phasianus colchicus	Common introduced resident breeder

== Divers ==
Order: Gaviiformes Family: Gaviidae

Divers are aquatic birds the size of a large duck, to which they are unrelated. They swim well and fly adequately but, because their legs are placed towards the rear of the body, are clumsy on land. They feed on fish and other aquatic animals.

Common name	Binomial	Status
Red-throated diver	Gavia stellata	Rare in winter, LROS
Black-throated diver	Gavia arctica	Rare in winter, LROS
Great northern diver	Gavia immer	Scarce in winter

== Grebes ==
Order: Podicipediformes Family: Podicipedidae

Grebes are small to medium-large diving birds with lobed toes and pointed bills. They are seen mainly on lowland waterbodies and coasts. They feed on aquatic animals and nest on a floating platform of vegetation. There are about 19 species worldwide with five in Leicestershire and Rutland.

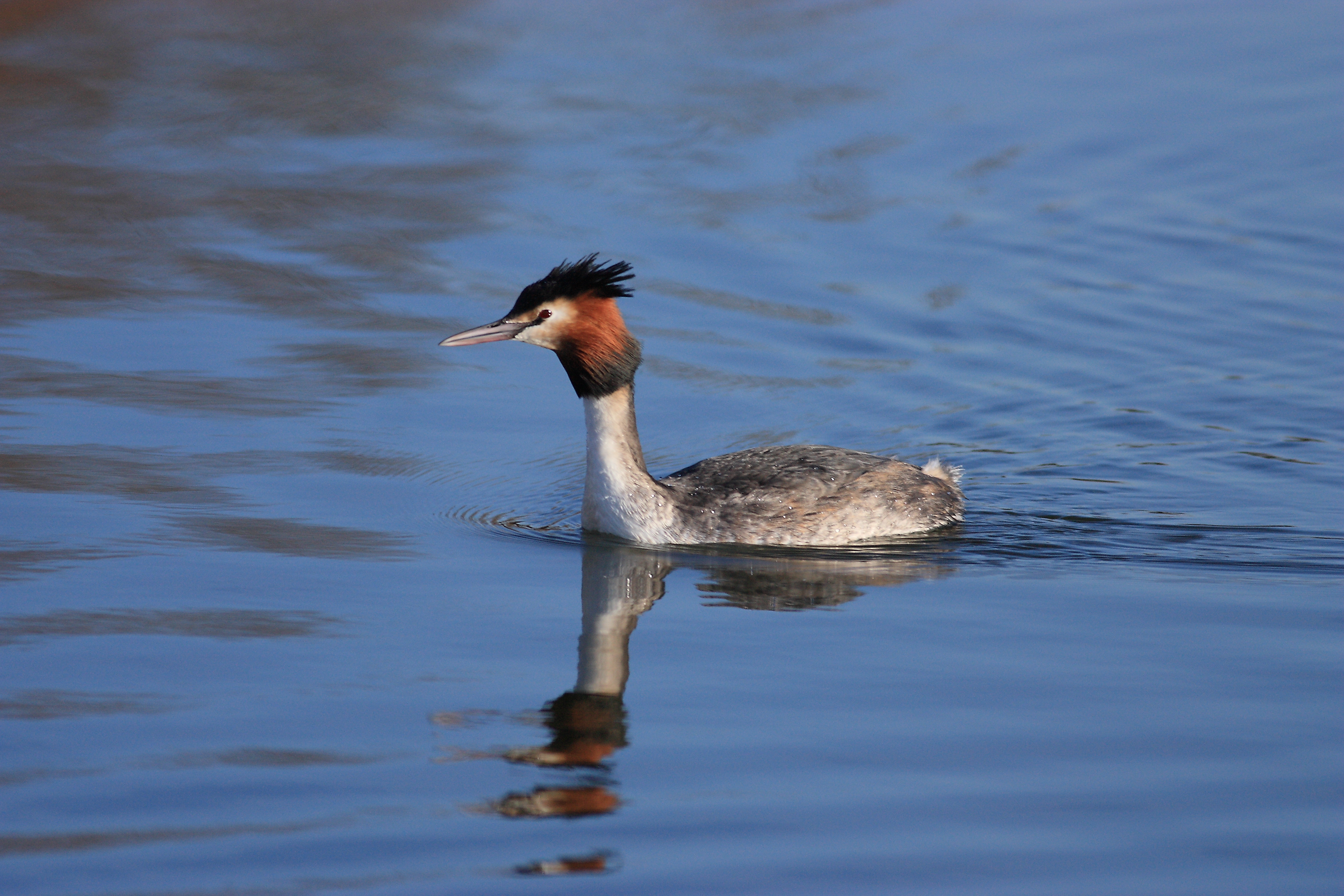
A great crested grebe swimming at Rutland Water

Common name	Binomial	Status
Little grebe	Tachybaptus ruficollis	Uncommon to fairly common breeding
Great crested grebe	Podiceps cristatus	Fairly common in winter and on passage, uncommon breeding
Red-necked grebe	Podiceps grisegena	Scarce in winter and on passage
Slavonian grebe	Podiceps auritus	Scarce in winter and on passage
Black-necked grebe	Podiceps nigricollis	Uncommon in summer and on passage, rare in winter
Pied-billed grebe	Podilymbus podiceps	Very rare

== Shearwaters and petrels ==
Order: Procellariiformes Family: Procellariidae

These are highly pelagic birds with long, narrow wings and tube-shaped nostrils. They feed at sea on fish, squid and other marine life. They come to land to breed in colonies, nesting in burrows or on cliffs. There are about 77 species worldwide, two of which are rare vagrants to Leicestershire and Rutland.

Common name	Binomial	Status
Northern fulmar	Fulmarus glacialis	Very rare, LROS
Manx shearwater	Puffinus puffinus	Very rare, LROS

== Storm petrels ==
Order: Procellariiformes Family: Hydrobatidae

The storm-petrels are the smallest seabirds, feeding on plankton and small fish picked from the surface, typically while hovering. They nest in colonies on the ground, most often in burrows. There are about 20 species worldwide, two of which are rare vagrants to Leicestershire and Rutland.

Common name	Binomial	Status
European storm petrel	Hydrobates pelagicus	Very rare, LROS
Leach's storm petrel	Oceanodroma leucorhea	Very rare, LROS

== Gannets ==
Order: Suliformes Family: Sulidae

Gannets are large seabirds that plunge-dive for fish and nest in large colonies. They have a torpedo-shaped body, long, narrow, pointed wings and a fairly long tail. There are about 10 species worldwide, with one recorded as a rare vagrant to Leicestershire and Rutland.

Common name	Binomial	Status
Northern gannet	Morus bassanus	Very rare, LROS

== Cormorants ==
Order: Suliformes Family: Phalacrocoracidae

Cormorants are medium to large aquatic birds with mainly dark plumage and areas of coloured skin on the face. The bill is long, thin and sharply hooked for catching fish and aquatic invertebrates. They nest in colonies, usually by the sea. There are about 39 species worldwide, with two recorded in Leicestershire and Rutland.

Common name	Binomial	Status
Great cormorant	Phalacrocorax carbo	Fairly common all year, common breeding
Common shag	Gulosus aristotelis	Scarce in winter and on passage

== Bitterns, herons and egrets ==
Order: Pelecaniformes Family: Ardeidae

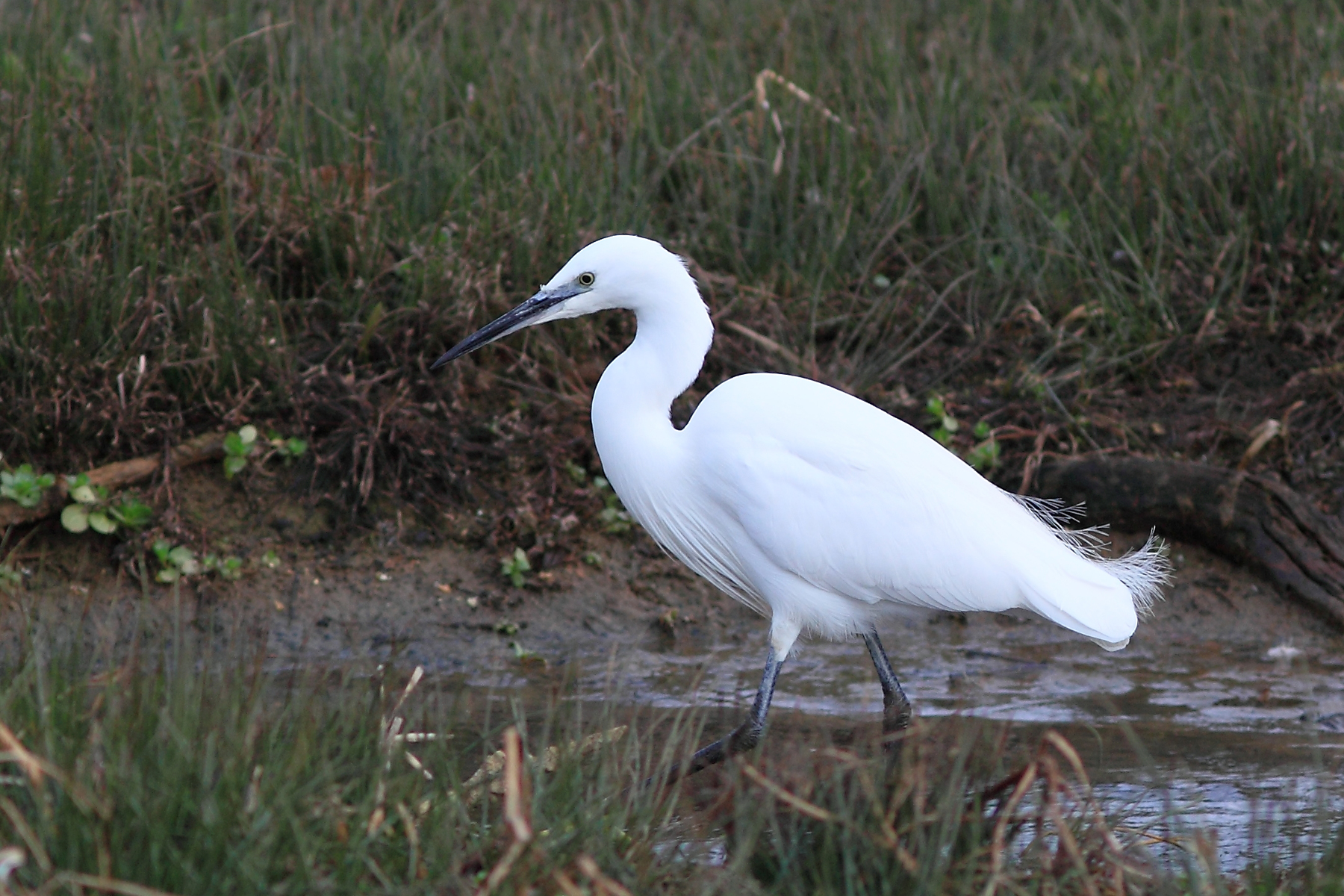
A little egret in Rutland Water, an uncommon visitor

Herons and egrets are medium to large wading birds with long necks and legs. Bitterns tend to be shorter-necked and more secretive. They all fly with their necks retracted. The sharp bill is used to catch fish, amphibians and other animals. Many species nest in colonies, often in trees.

Common name	Binomial	Status
Great bittern	Botaurus stellata	Scarce in winter
Little bittern	Ixobrychus minutus	Very rare, BBRC
Black-crowned night heron	Nycticorax nycticorax	Very rare, LROS
Squacco heron	Ardeola ralloides	Very rare, BBRC
Cattle egret	Bubulcus ibis	Very rare, BBRC
Little egret	Egretta garzetta	Uncommon in summer and on passage
Great egret	Ardea alba	Very rare, LROS
Grey heron	Ardea cinerea	Fairly common, breeds
Purple heron	Ardea purpurea	Very rare, LROS

== Ibises and spoonbills ==
Order: Pelecaniformes Family: Threskiornithidae

A family of long-legged, long-necked wading birds. Ibises have long, curved bills. Spoonbills have a flattened bill, wider at the tip.

Common name	Binomial	Status
Common spoonbill	Platalea leucorodia	Rare

== Storks ==
Order: Ciconiiformes Family: Ciconiidae

Storks are large, heavy, long-legged, long-necked wading birds with long stout bills and wide wingspans. They fly with the neck extended.

Common name	Binomial	Status
Black stork	Ciconia nigra	Very rare, BBRC
White stork	Ciconia ciconia	Very rare, LROS

== Osprey ==
Order: Accipitriformes Family: Pandionidae

A large migratory fish-eating bird of prey in a family of its own. It is mainly brown above and white below with long, angled wings.

Common name	Binomial	Status
Osprey	Pandion haliaetus	Scarce on passage, scarce introduced breeder

== Buzzards, kites and allies ==
Order: Accipitriformes Family: Accipitridae

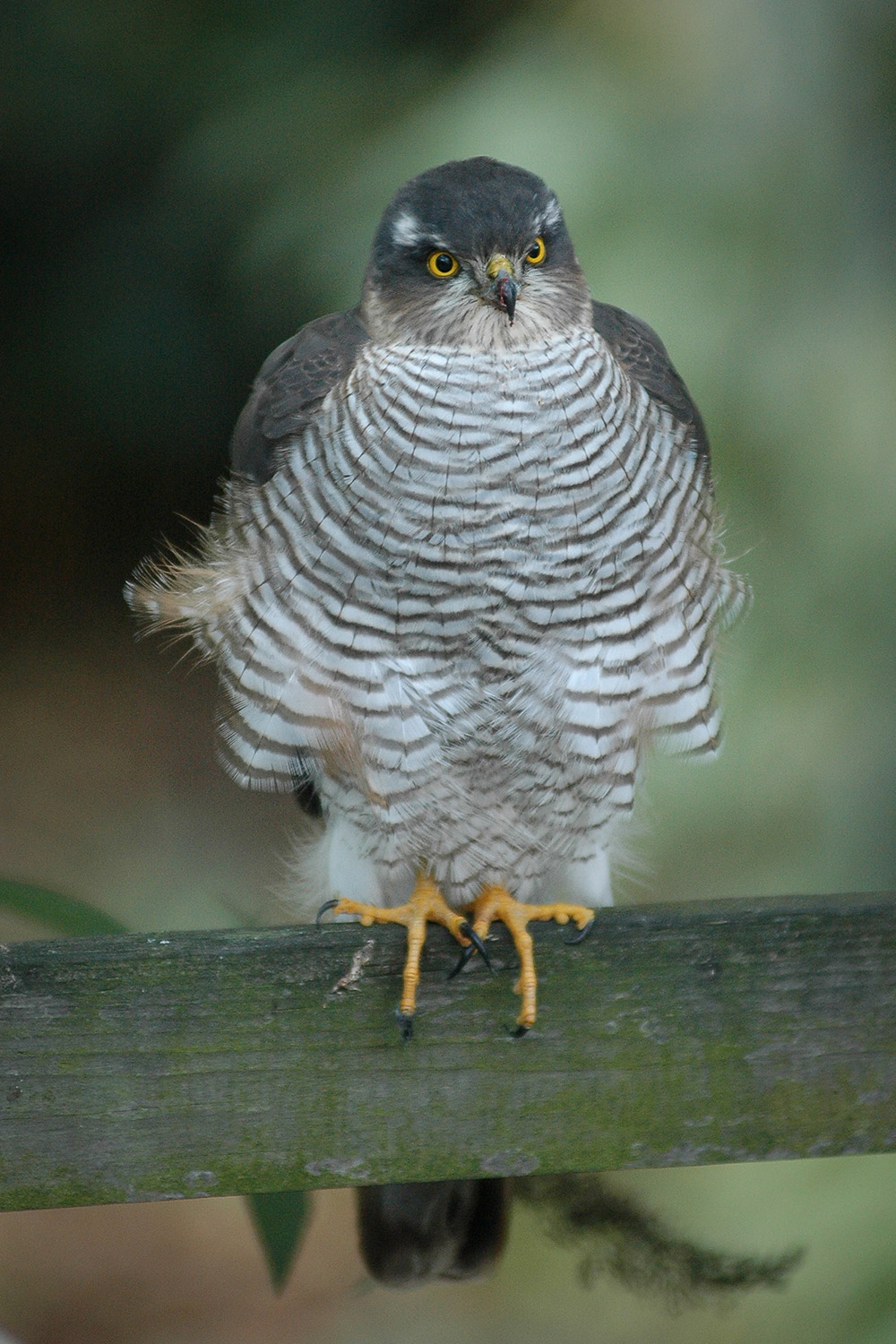
Eurasian sparrowhawk

A family of birds of prey which includes hawks, buzzards, eagles, kites and harriers. These birds have very large powerful hooked beaks for tearing flesh from their prey, strong legs, powerful talons and keen eyesight.

Common name	Binomial	Status
European honey buzzard	Pernis apivorus	Rare, LROS
Red kite	Milvus milvus	Rare on passage, very rare breeder (spread from re-introduction in Northamptonshire)
White-tailed eagle	Haliaeetus albicilla	Very rare, LROS
Marsh harrier	Circus aeruginosus	Uncommon on passage
Hen harrier	Circus cyaneus	Scarce, LROS
Pallid harrier	Circus macrourus	Very rare, BBRC
Montagu's harrier	Circus pygargus	Very rare, LROS
Northern goshawk	Accipiter gentilis	Rare to scarce, LROS
Eurasian sparrowhawk	Accipiter nisus	Fairly common resident
Common buzzard	Buteo buteo	Uncommon to fairly common resident and on passage
Rough-legged buzzard	Buteo lagopus	Rare in winter and on passage, LROS
Golden eagle	Aquila chrysaetos	Very rare, one record 1895 LROS

== Falcons ==
Order: Falconiformes Family: Falconidae

A family of small to medium-sized, diurnal birds of prey with pointed wings. They do not build their own nests and mainly catch prey in the air.

Common name	Binomial	Status
Common kestrel	Falco tinnunculus	Fairly common breeding resident
Red-footed falcon	Falco vespertinus	Very rare, LROS
Merlin	Falco columbarius	Scarce in winter and on passage, LROS
Eurasian hobby	Falco subbuteo	Scarce to uncommon breeding summer visitor
Peregrine falcon	Falco peregrinus	Uncommon in winter and on passage, scarce breeding

== Rails, crakes and coots ==
Order: Gruiformes Family: Rallidae

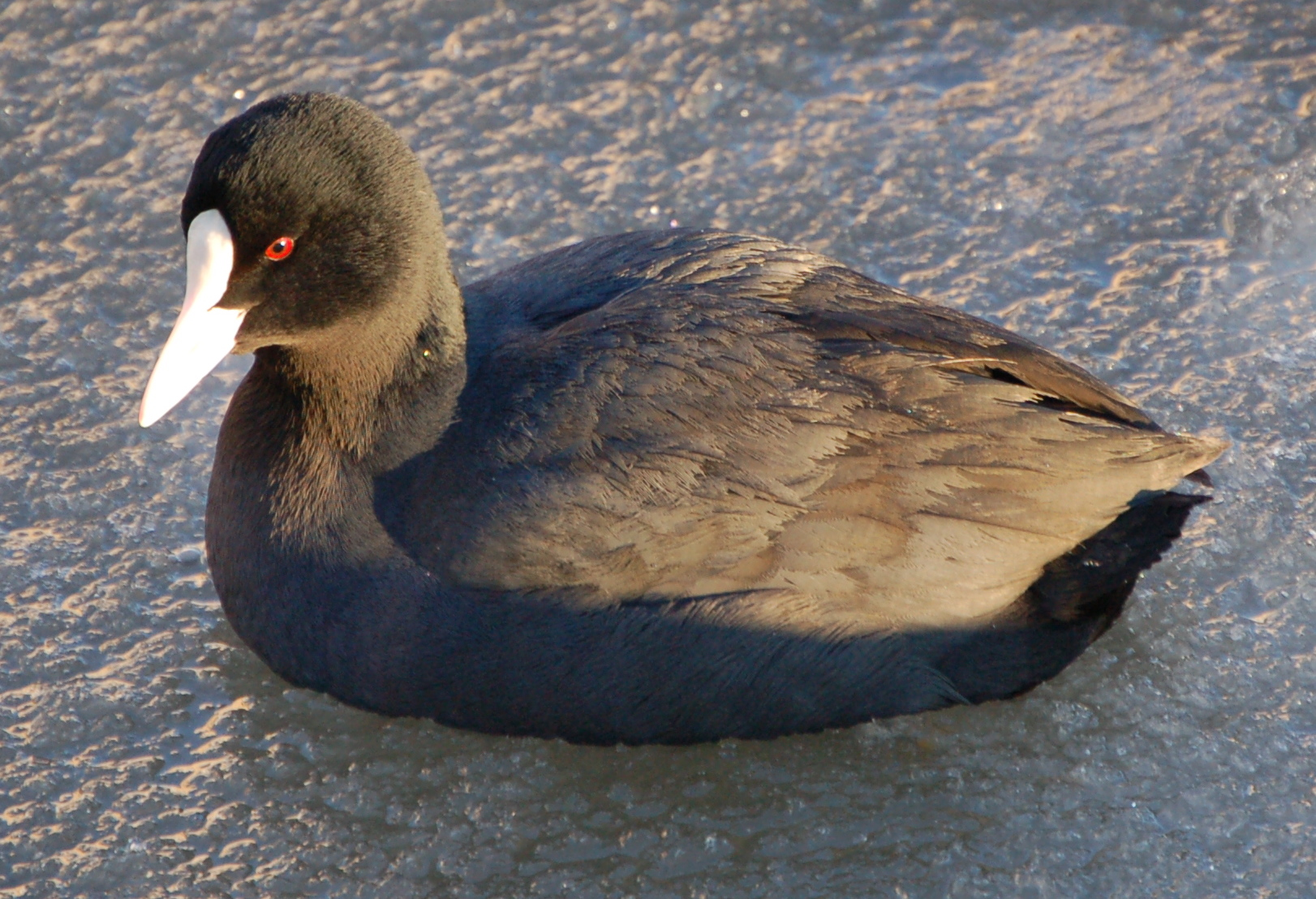
Eurasian coot

Rails and allies mainly occupy dense vegetation in damp environments near lakes, marshes or rivers. Many are shy and secretive birds, making them difficult to observe. Most species have strong legs and long toes which are well adapted to soft uneven surfaces.

Common name	Binomial	Status
Water rail	Rallus aquaticus	Uncommon in winter and on passage, rare breeding
Spotted crake	Porzana porzana	Rare on passage, bred in nineteenth century, LROS
Little crake	Porzana parva	Very rare, one old record from 1841, BBRC
Baillon's crake	Porzana pusilla	Very rare, BBRC
Corn crake	Crex crex	Very rare, bred to about 1960, LROS
Common moorhen	Gallinula chloropus	Common resident breeder
Eurasian coot	Fulica atra	Common in winter, fairly common breeding

== Cranes ==
Order: Gruiformes Family: Gruidae

Cranes are large, long-legged and long-necked birds. Unlike the similar-looking but unrelated herons, cranes fly with necks outstretched, not pulled back. Most have elaborate and noisy courting displays or "dances".

Common name	Binomial	Status
Common crane	Grus grus	Very rare, LROS

== Oystercatchers ==
Order: Charadriiformes Family: Haematopodidae

The oystercatchers are large, obvious and noisy wading birds with strong bills used for smashing or prising open molluscs. There are about 11 species worldwide with one recorded in Leicestershire and Rutland.

Common name	Binomial	Status
Pied oystercatcher	Haematopus ostralegus	Uncommon on passage, scarce breeding

== Avocets and stilts ==
Order: Charadriiformes Family: Recurvirostridae

A family of fairly large wading birds. The avocets have long legs and long up-curved bills. The stilts have extremely long legs and long, thin, straight bills. There are about 10 species worldwide, with two recorded in Leicestershire and Rutland.

Common name	Binomial	Status
Black-winged stilt	Himantopus himantopus	Very rare, LROS
Pied avocet	Recurvirostra avosetta	Rare to scarce on passage, rare breeding

== Thick-knees ==
Order: Charadriiformes Family: Burhinidae

A small family of medium to large waders with strong black bills, large yellow eyes and cryptic plumage. There are 9 species worldwide, with one recorded in Leicestershire and Rutland.

Common name	Binomial	Status
Stone-curlew	Burhinus oedicnemus	Very rare, bred to about 1880, LROS

== Pratincoles and coursers ==
Order: Charadriiformes Family: Glareolidae

A family of slender, long-winged wading birds. There are 17 species worldwide, three of which have occurred as vagrants in Leicestershire and Rutland.

Common name	Binomial	Status
Cream-coloured courser	Cursorius cursor	Very rare, one 1827 record, BBRC
Collared pratincole	Glareola pratincola	Very rare, BBRC
Black-winged pratincole	Glareola nordmanni	Very rare, BBRC

== Plovers and lapwings ==
Order: Charadriiformes Family: Charadriidae

Small to medium-sized wading birds with compact bodies, short, thick necks and long, usually pointed, wings. There are about 66 species worldwide, nine of which have been recorded in Leicestershire and Rutland.

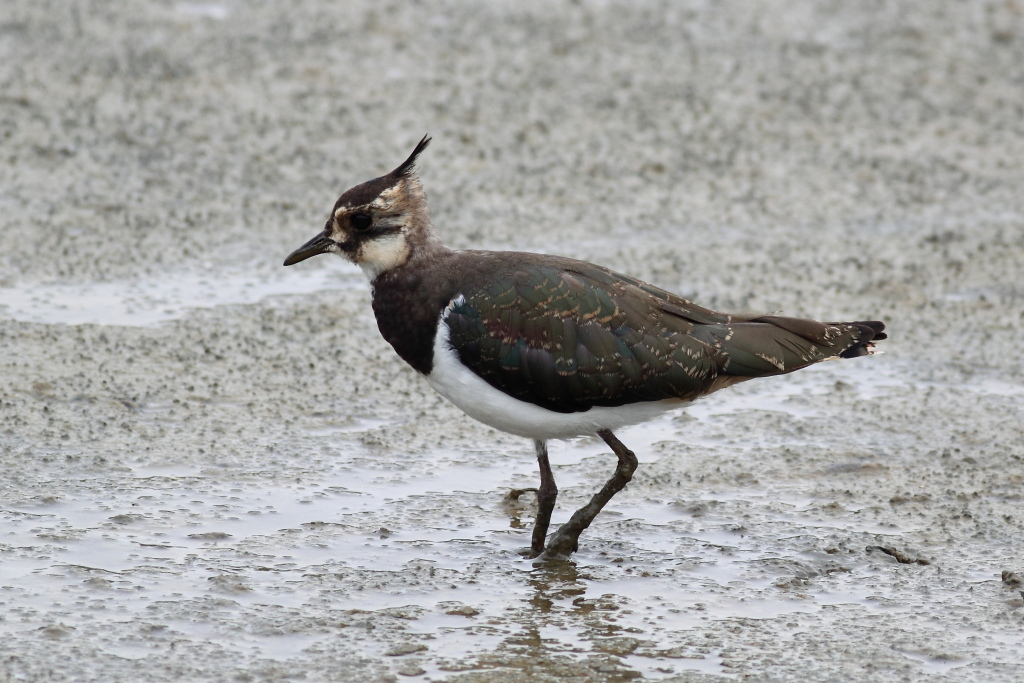
A northern lapwing wading through mud at Rutland Water

Common name	Binomial	Status
Little ringed plover	Charadrius dubius	Uncommon on passage and breeding
Ringed plover	Charadrius hiaticula	Fairly common on passage, scarce breeding
Killdeer	Charadrius vociferus	Very rare, BBRC
Kentish plover	Charadrius alexandrinus	Very rare, LROS
Eurasian dotterel	Charadrius morinellus	Rare on passage, LROS
American golden plover	Pluvialis dominica	Very rare, LROS
European golden plover	Pluvialis apricaria	Common in winter and on passage
Grey plover	Pluvialis squatarola	Scarce in winter and on passage
Northern lapwing	Vanellus vanellus	Abundant in winter; fairly common breeding

== Sandpipers and allies ==
Order: Charadriiformes Family: Scolopacidae

A large, diverse family of wading birds. Different lengths of legs and bills enable multiple species to feed in the same habitat, particularly on the coast, without direct competition for food. There are about 89 species worldwide, 32 of which have been recorded in Leicestershire and Rutland.

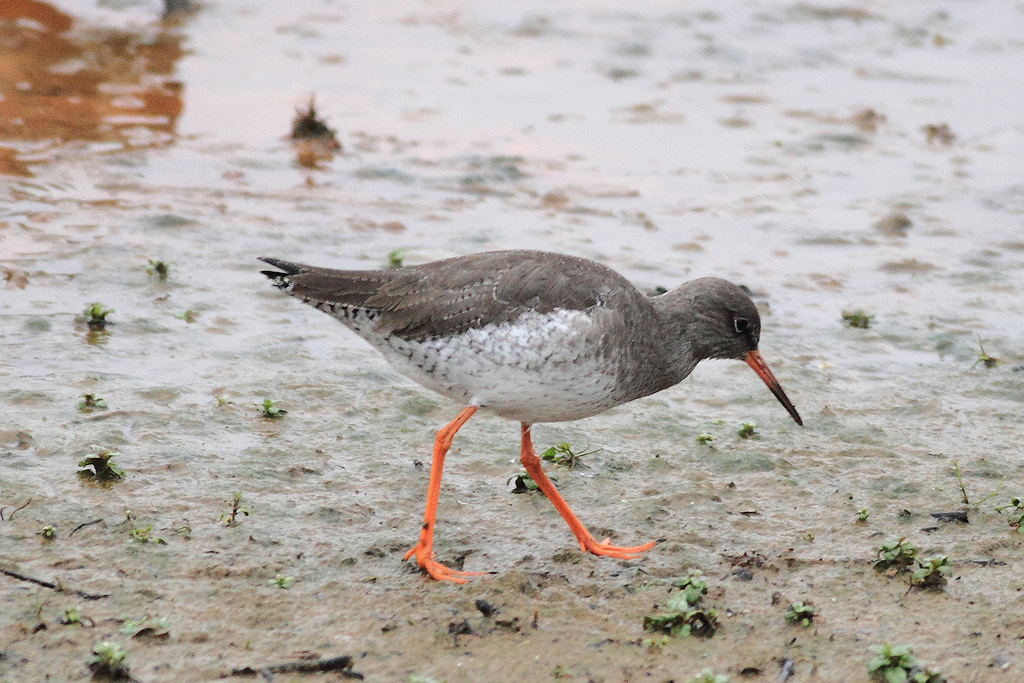
A common redshank in winter plumage at Rutland Water

Common name	Binomial	Status
Red knot	Calidris canutus	Scarce on passage, rare in winter
Sanderling	Calidris alba	Scarce to uncommon on passage
Little stint	Calidris minuta	Uncommon on passage, rare in winter
Temminck's stint	Calidris temminckii	Rare, LROS
White-rumped sandpiper	Calidris fuscicollis	Very rare, LROS
Baird's sandpiper	Calidris bairdii	Very rare, BBRC
Pectoral sandpiper	Calidris melanotos	Rare, LROS
Curlew sandpiper	Calidris ferruginea	Uncommon on passage
Purple sandpiper	Calidris maritima	Very rare, LROS
Dunlin	Calidris alpina	Uncommon to fairly common in winter and on passage
Ruff	Philomachus pugnax	Uncommon in winter and on passage
Jack snipe	Lymnocryptes minimus	Uncommon in winter and on passage
Common snipe	Gallinago gallinago	Fairly common in winter and on passage, rare breeding
Great snipe	Gallinago media	Very rare, 14 records in nineteenth century, none since, BBRC
Long-billed dowitcher	Limnodromus scolopaceus	Very rare, BBRC
Eurasian woodcock	Scolopax rusticola	Uncommon to fairly common in winter and on passage, rare breeding
Black-tailed godwit	Limosa limosa	Fairly common on passage, rare in winter
Bar-tailed godwit	Limosa lapponica	Scarce to uncommon on passage, rare in winter
Whimbrel	Numenius phaeopus	Uncommon on passage
Eurasian curlew	Numenius arquata	Uncommon on passage; scarce in winter; rare-scarce breeding
Spotted redshank	Tringa erythropus	Scarce to uncommon on passage
Common redshank	Tringa totanus	Fairly common on passage; uncommon in winter; scarce breeding
Common greenshank	Tringa nebularia	Uncommon on passage
Lesser yellowlegs	Tringa flavipes	Very rare, BBRC
Green sandpiper	Tringa ochropus	Fairly common on passage; uncommon in winter;
Wood sandpiper	Tringa glareola	Scarce on passage
Common sandpiper	Actitis hypoleucos	Scarce to uncommon on passage, rare in winter, bred to 1908
Spotted sandpiper	Actitis macularius	Very rare, BBRC
Ruddy turnstone	Arenaria interpres	Uncommon on passage
Wilson's phalarope	Phalaropus tricolor	Very rare, BBRC
Red-necked phalarope	Phalaropus lobatus	Rare, LROS
Grey phalarope	Phalaropus fulicaria	Rare, LROS

== Skuas ==
Order: Charadriiformes Family: Stercorariidae

Medium to large seabirds with mainly grey or brown plumage, sharp claws and a hooked tip to the bill. They chase other seabirds to force them to drop their catches. There are about seven species worldwide, with four recorded in Leicestershire and Rutland.

Common name	Binomial	Status
Pomarine skua	Stercorarius pomarinus	Very rare, LROS
Arctic skua	Stercorarius parasiticus	Rare, LROS
Long-tailed skua	Stercorarius longicaudus	Very rare, LROS
Great skua	Stercorarius skua	Rare, LROS

== Gulls ==
Order: Charadriiformes Family: Laridae

Medium to large seabirds with grey, white and black plumage, webbed feet and strong bills. Many are opportunistic and adaptable feeders. There are about 56 species worldwide, 16 of which have been recorded in Leicestershire and Rutland.

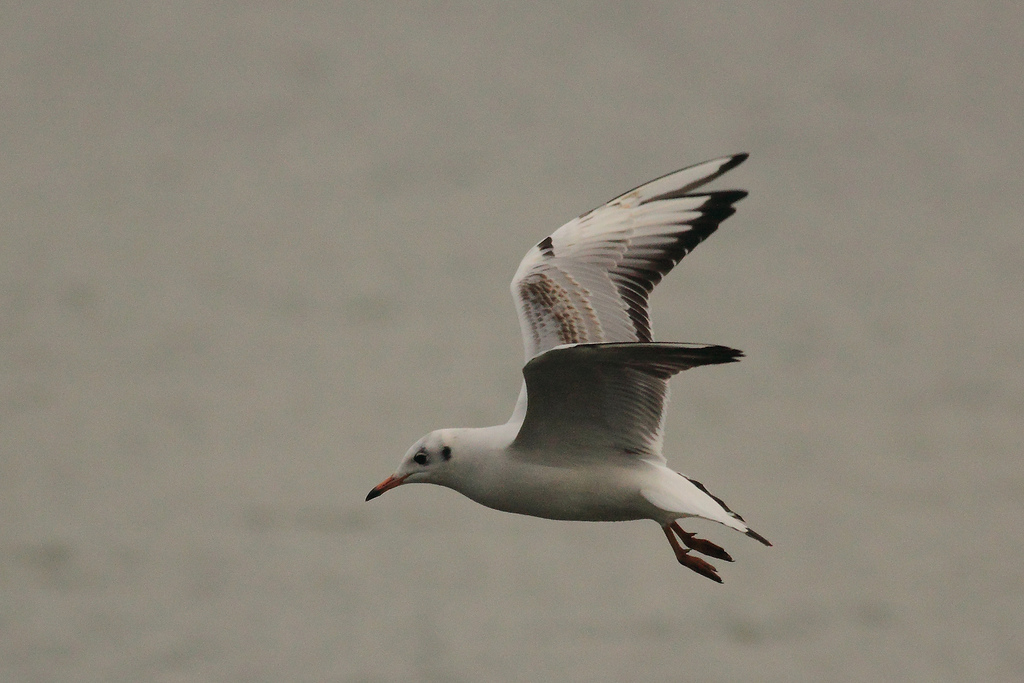
A black-headed gull in winter plumage flying at Rutland Water

Common name	Binomial	Status
Mediterranean gull	Ichthyaetus melanocephalus	Uncommon in winter and on passage
Laughing gull	Leucophaeus atricilla	Very rare, BBRC
Franklin's gull	Leucophaeus pipixcan	Very rare, BBRC
Little gull	Hydrocoloeus minutus	Uncommon on passage; rare to scarce in winter;
Sabine's gull	Xema sabini	Very rare, LROS
Black-headed gull	Chroicocephalus ridibundus	Abundant in winter, uncommon breeding
Ring-billed gull	Larus delawarensis	Very rare, LROS
Common gull	Larus canus	Abundant in winter, fairly common to common on passage
Lesser black-backed gull	Larus fuscus	Common in winter and on passage
Yellow-legged gull	Larus michahellis	Uncommon in winter and on passage
Herring gull	Larus argentatus	Common in winter, scarce to uncommon on passage
Caspian gull	Larus cachinnans	Uncommon in winter and on passage
Iceland gull	Larus glaucoides	Rare to scarce in winter, LROS
Glaucous gull	Larus hyperboreus	Rare to scarce in winter, LROS
Great black-backed gull	Larus marinus	Fairly common in winter, scarce to uncommon on passage
Black-legged kittiwake	Rissa tridactyla	Scarce on passage

== Terns ==
Order: Charadriiformes Family: Sternidae

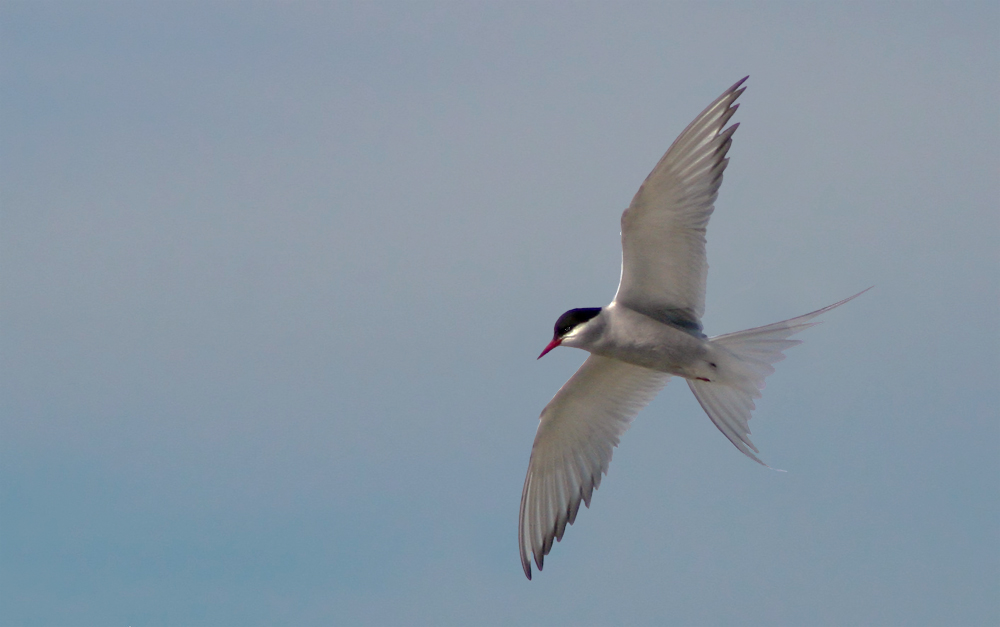
Arctic tern

Terns are slender seabirds with long, pointed wings, a pointed bill and a tail which is usually forked. There are about 44 species worldwide, 10 recorded in Leicestershire and Rutland.

Common name	Binomial	Status
Caspian tern	Hydroprogne caspia	Very rare, BBRC
Sandwich tern	Sterna sandvicensis	Scarce on passage
Roseate tern	Sterna dougallii	Very rare, LROS
Common tern	Sterna hirundo	Uncommon to fairly common on passage, uncommon breeding
Arctic tern	Sterna paradisaea	Uncommon to fairly common on passage
Bridled tern	Onychoprion anaethetus	Very rare, BBRC
Little tern	Sternula albifrons	Scarce on passage
Whiskered tern	Chlidonias hybridus	Very rare, BBRC
Black tern	Chlidonias niger	Uncommon on passage
White-winged tern	Chlidonias leucopterus	Very rare, LROS

== Auks ==
Order: Charadriiformes Family: Alcidae

Auks are seabirds which are superficially similar to penguins with their black-and-white colours, their upright posture and some of their habits, but the living species are able to fly. There are about 23 species worldwide, four of which are rare vagrants in Leicestershire and Rutland.

Common name	Binomial	Status
Common guillemot	Uria aalge	Very rare, LROS
Razorbill	Alca torda	Very rare, LROS
Little auk	Alle alle	Rare, LROS
Atlantic puffin	Fratercula arctica	Very rare, LROS

== Sandgrouse ==
Order: Pterocliformes Family: Pteroclidae

Sturdy, medium-sized birds with a small head and long, pointed wings. There are 16 species worldwide, one of which has occurred as a vagrant in Leicestershire and Rutland.

Common name	Binomial	Status
Pallas's sandgrouse	Syrrhaptes paradoxus	Very rare, except at least 45 birds in an 1888 population peak and temporary range expansion, BBRC

== Pigeons and doves ==
Order: Columbiformes Family: Columbidae

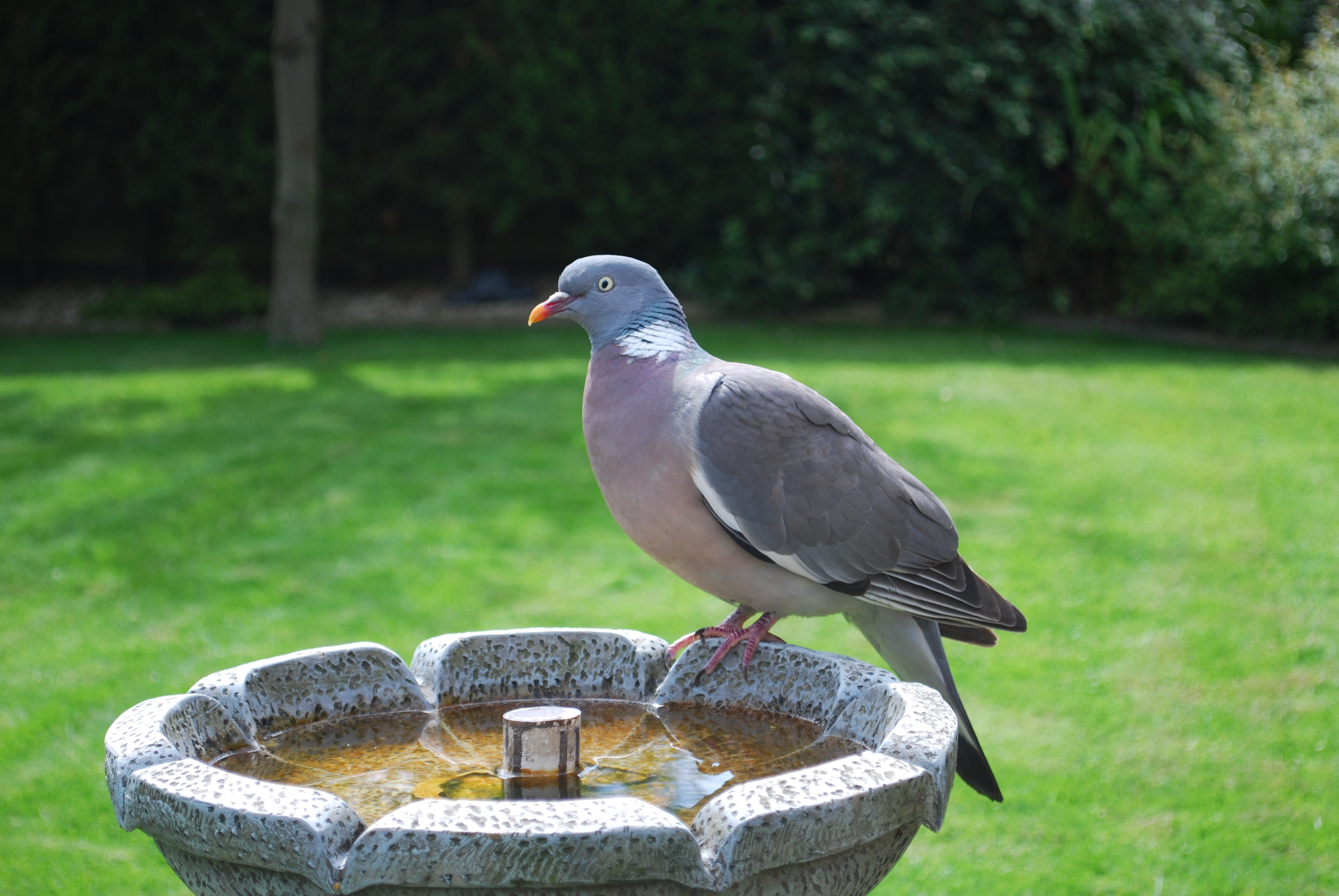
Common wood pigeon

Pigeons and doves are stout-bodied birds with short necks and short slender bills with a fleshy cere. There are about 308 species worldwide, five of which occur in Leicestershire and Rutland.

Common name	Binomial	Status
Feral pigeon	Columba livia	Common feral resident
Stock dove	Columba oenas	Common resident breeding
Common wood pigeon	Columba palumbus	Abundant resident breeding
Eurasian collared dove	Streptopelia decaocto	Common resident breeding
Turtle dove	Streptopelia turtur	Uncommon breeding summer visitor

== Cuckoos ==
Order: Cuculiformes Family: Cuculidae

Birds of variable size with slender bodies and long tails. Some species are lay their eggs in the nests of other birds. There are about 141 species worldwide, one of which breeds in Leicestershire and Rutland.

Common name	Binomial	Status
Common cuckoo	Cuculus canorus	Fairly common breeding summer visitor

== Barn owls ==
Order: Strigiformes Family: Tytonidae

Barn owls are medium-sized to large owls with large heads and characteristic heart-shaped faces. They have long strong legs with powerful talons. There are about 16 species worldwide, with one in Leicestershire and Rutland.

Common name	Binomial	Status
Barn owl	Tyto alba	Uncommon breeding resident

== Typical owls ==
Order: Strigiformes Family: Strigidae

Typical owls are small to large solitary nocturnal birds of prey. They have large forward-facing eyes and ears, a hawk-like beak and a conspicuous circle of feathers around each eye called a facial disc. There are about 199 species worldwide, with four recorded in Leicestershire and Rutland.

Common name	Binomial	Status
Little owl	Athene noctua	Introduced. Fairly common resident breeding
Tawny owl	Strix aluco	Fairly common resident breeding
Long-eared owl	Asio otus	Scarce in winter, rare breeding
Short-eared owl	Asio flammeus	Uncommon in winter

== Nightjars ==
Order: Caprimulgiformes Family: Caprimulgidae

Nightjars are medium-sized nocturnal birds that usually nest on the ground. They have long wings, short legs and very short bills. Their soft plumage is cryptically coloured to resemble bark or leaves. There are about 91 species worldwide, one of which occurs in Leicestershire and Rutland.

Common name	Binomial	Status
European nightjar	Caprimulgus europaeus	Rare to scarce in summer and on passage

== Swifts ==
Order: Apodiformes Family: Apodidae

The swifts are small birds which spend the majority of their lives flying. These birds have very short legs and never settle voluntarily on the ground, perching instead only on vertical surfaces. There are about 100 species worldwide, two of which have been recorded in Leicestershire and Rutland.

Common name	Binomial	Status
Common swift	Apus apus	Common summer breeding visitor
Alpine swift	Apus melba	Very rare, LROS

== Kingfishers ==
Order: Coraciiformes Family: Alcedinidae

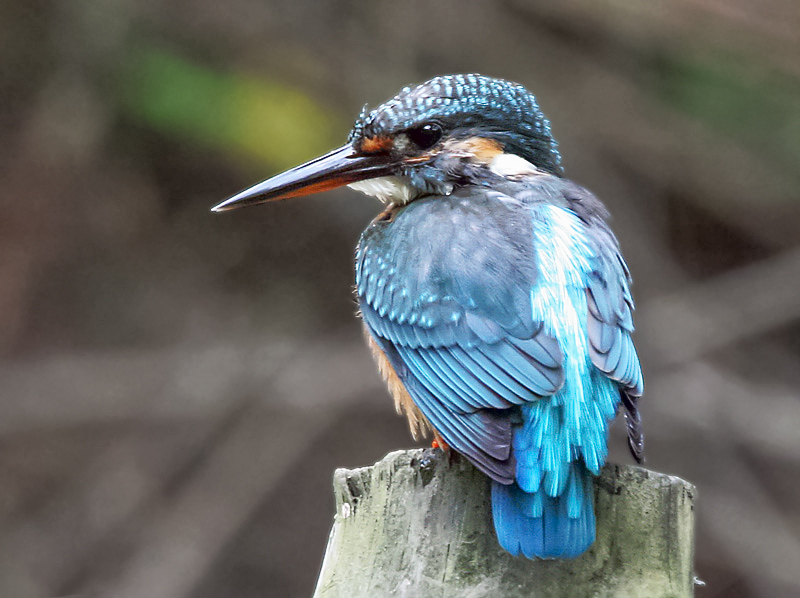
Common kingfisher

Kingfishers are medium-sized birds with large heads, long pointed bills, short legs and stubby tails. There are about 93 species worldwide, one of which breeds in Leicestershire and Rutland.

Common name	Binomial	Status
Common kingfisher	Alcedo atthis	Uncommon breeding resident

== Bee-eaters ==
Order: Coraciiformes Family: Meropidae

A group of near-passerine birds characterised by richly coloured plumage, slender bodies and usually elongated central tail feathers. There are about 26 species worldwide, one of which has occurred in Leicestershire and Rutland.

Common name	Binomial	Status
European bee-eater	Merops apiaster	Very rare, LROS

== Rollers ==
Order: Coraciiformes Family: Coraciidae

A small family of colourful, medium-sized birds with a crow-like shape that feed mainly on insects. There are about 12 species worldwide, one of which has occurred in Leicestershire and Rutland.

Common name	Binomial	Status
European roller	Coracias garrulus	Very rare, BBRC

== Hoopoe ==
Order: Coraciiformes Family: Upupidae

A distinctive bird in its own family with a long curved bill, a crest and black-and-white striped wings and tail.

Common name	Binomial	Status
Hoopoe	Upupa epops	Very rare, LROS

== Woodpeckers ==
Order: Piciformes Family: Picidae

Woodpeckers are small to medium-sized birds with chisel-like beaks, short legs, stiff tails and long tongues used for capturing insects. Many woodpeckers have the habit of tapping noisily on tree trunks with their beaks. There are about 219 species worldwide, four recorded in Leicestershire and Rutland.

Common name	Binomial	Status
Eurasian wryneck	Jynx torquilla	Very rare, bred to 1903, LROS
European green woodpecker	Picus viridis	Fairly common breeding resident
Great spotted woodpecker	Dendrocopos major	Fairly common breeding resident
Lesser spotted woodpecker	Dryobates minor	Uncommon breeding resident

== Larks ==
Order: Passeriformes Family: Alaudidae

Larks are small terrestrial birds with often extravagant songs and display flights. Most larks are fairly dull in appearance. Their food is insects and seeds. There are about 96 species worldwide, three of which have been recorded in Leicestershire and Rutland.

Common name	Binomial	Status
Wood lark	Lullula arborea	Rare, bred to about 1840, LROS
Skylark	Alauda arvensis	Common breeding, wintering and on passage
Shore lark	Eremophila alpestris	Very rare, LROS

== Swallows and martins ==
Order: Passeriformes Family: Hirundinidae

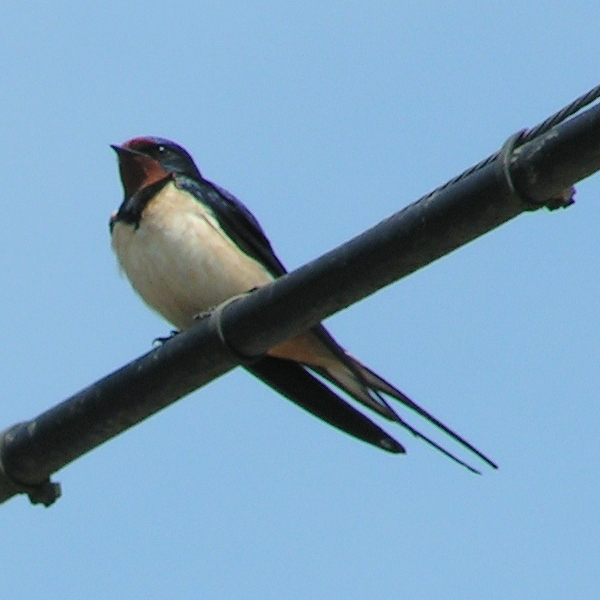
Barn swallow

This is adapted to aerial feeding. They have a slender streamlined body, long pointed wings and a short bill with a wide gape. There are about 83 species worldwide, five of which have been recorded in Leicestershire and Rutland.

Common name	Binomial	Status
Sand martin	Riparia riparia	Fairly common summer breeding visitor
Crag martin	Ptyonoprogne rupestris	Very rare, BBRC
Barn swallow	Hirundo rustica	Common summer breeding visitor
Red-rumped swallow	Hirundo daurica	Very rare, LROS
Common house martin	Delichon urbicum	Common summer breeding visitor

== Wagtails and pipits ==
Order: Passeriformes Family: Motacillidae

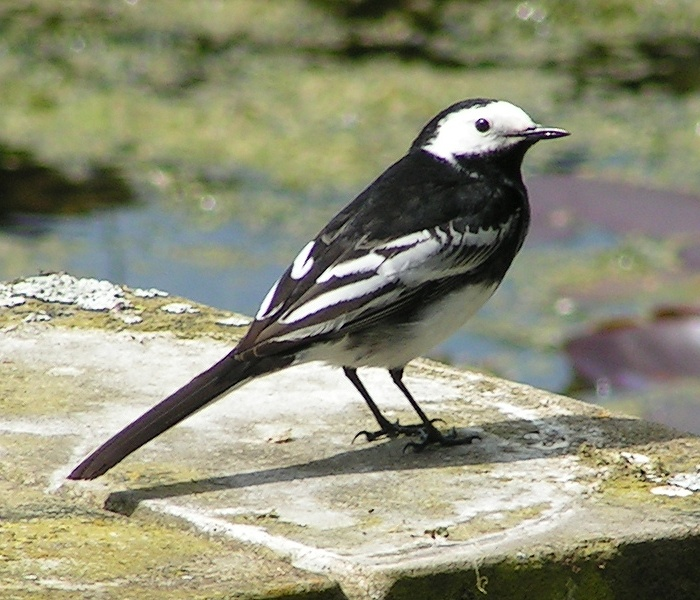
Pied wagtail, British race Motacilla alba yarelli

Motacillidae is a family of small passerine birds with medium to long tails. They are slender, ground-feeding insectivores of open country. There are about 66 species worldwide, 10 of which have been recorded in Leicestershire and Rutland.

Common name	Binomial	Status
Citrine wagtail	Motacilla citreola	Very rare, BBRC
Pied wagtail	Motacilla alba	Common resident breeding
Grey wagtail	Motacilla cinerea	Uncommon resident breeding
Yellow wagtail	Motacilla flava	Uncommon summer breeding visitor, fairly common on passage
Richard's pipit	Anthus richardi	Very rare, LROS
Tree pipit	Anthus trivialis	Uncommon summer breeding visitor
Meadow pipit	Anthus pratensis	common on passage, fairly common in winter, uncommon breeding
Red-throated pipit	Anthus cervinus	Very rare, LROS
Water pipit	Anthus spinoletta	Very rare, LROS
Rock pipit	Anthus petrosus	Scarce in winter and on passage

== Waxwings ==
Order: Passeriformes Family: Bombycillidae

The waxwings are a group of passerine birds characterised by soft, silky plumage and unique red tips to some of the wing feathers. There are three species worldwide, one of which has been recorded in Leicestershire and Rutland.

Common name	Binomial	Status
Bohemian waxwing	Bombycilla garrulus	Rare to scarce in winter

== Dippers ==
Order: Passeriformes Family: Cinclidae

Dark, dumpy, aquatic birds that are able to forage for food on the beds of rivers. There are five species worldwide, with one recorded in Leicestershire and Rutland.

Common name	Binomial	Status
White-throated dipper	Cinclus cinclus	Very rare, bred to about 1840, LROS

== Wrens ==
Order: Passeriformes Family: Troglodytidae

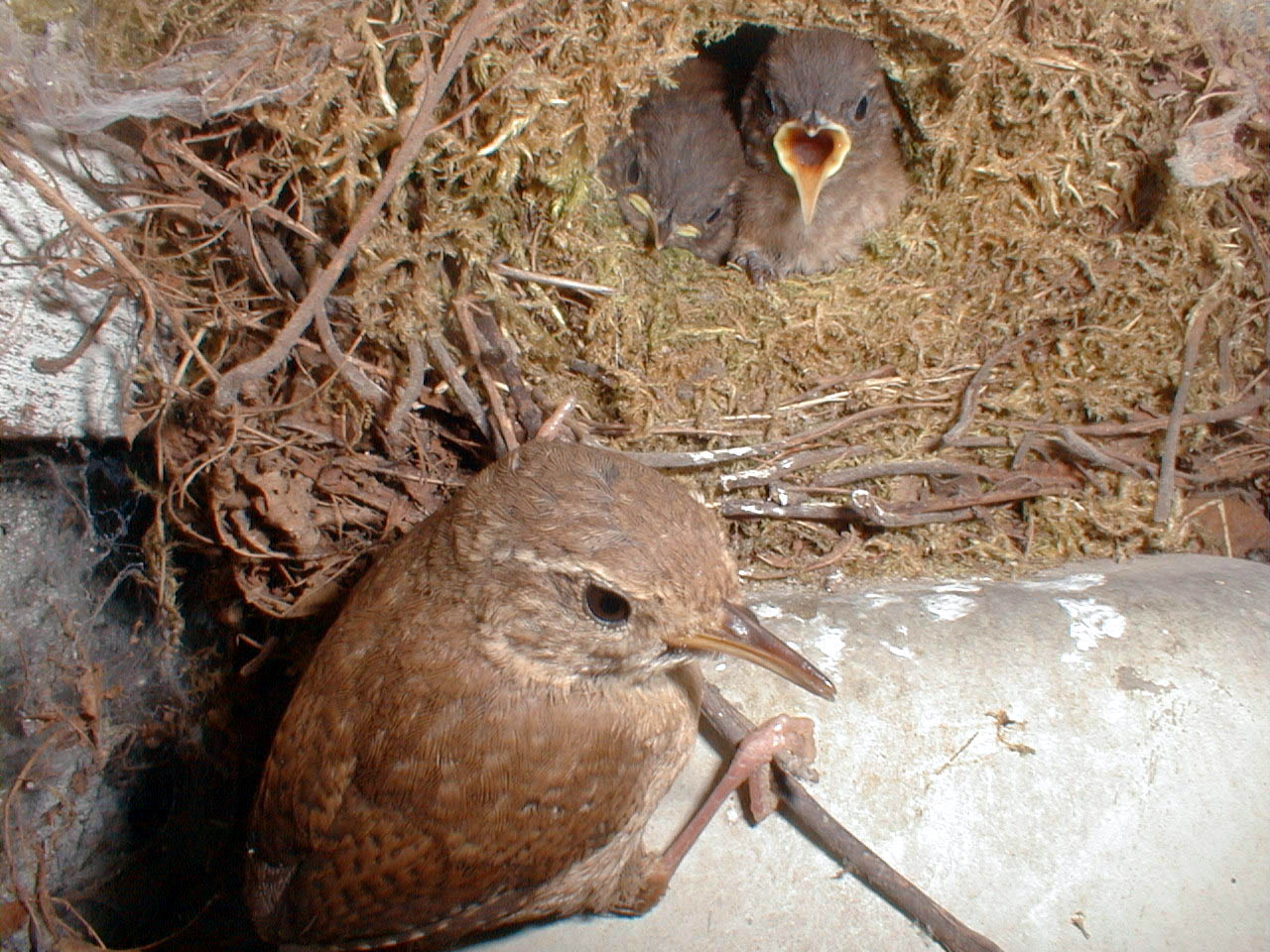
Wren at the nest

Wrens are small and inconspicuous birds, except for their loud songs. They have short wings and thin down-turned bills. There are about 80 species worldwide, with one breeding in Leicestershire and Rutland.

Common name	Binomial	Status
Wren	Troglodytes troglodytes	Abundant resident breeding

== Accentors ==
Order: Passeriformes Family: Prunellidae

A small family of drab, unobtrusive, insectivorous birds with thin, pointed bills. There are 13 species worldwide, with one in Leicestershire and Rutland.

Common name	Binomial	Status
Dunnock	Prunella modularis	Abundant resident breeding

== Thrushes ==
Order: Passeriformes Family: Turdidae

The thrushes are plump, soft-plumaged, small to medium-sized insectivores or sometimes omnivores, often feeding on the ground. Many have attractive songs. There are about 90 species worldwide, six in Leicestershire and Rutland.

Common name	Binomial	Status
Common blackbird	Turdus merula	Abundant resident breeding
Ring ouzel	Turdus torquatus	Scarce to uncommon on passage, formerly bred in the 19th century, LROS
Fieldfare	Turdus pilaris	Common in winter, rare in summer
Redwing	Turdus iliacus	Common in winter
Song thrush	Turdus philomelos	Common resident breeding
Mistle thrush	Turdus viscivorus	Common resident breeding

== Cettid warblers ==
Order: Passeriformes Family: Cettiidae

Common name	Binomial	Status
Cetti's warbler	Cettia cetti	Rare in winter and on passage

== Locustellid warblers ==
Order: Passeriformes Family: Locustellidae

Common name	Binomial	Status
Common grasshopper warbler	Locustella naevia	Uncommon breeding summer visitor
Savi's warbler	Locustella luscinioides	Very rare, LROS

== Acrocephalid warblers ==
Order: Passeriformes Family: Acrocephalidae

Common name	Binomial	Status
Aquatic warbler	Acrocephalus paludicola	Very rare, one occurrence in 1864, LROS
Sedge warbler	Acrocephalus schoenobaenus	Common breeding summer visitor
Eurasian reed warbler	Acrocephalus scirpaceus	Fairly common breeding summer visitor
Marsh warbler	Acrocephalus palustris	Very rare, LROS
Great reed warbler	Acrocephalus arundinaceus	Very rare, BBRC

== Phylloscopid warblers ==
Order: Passeriformes Family: Phylloscopidae

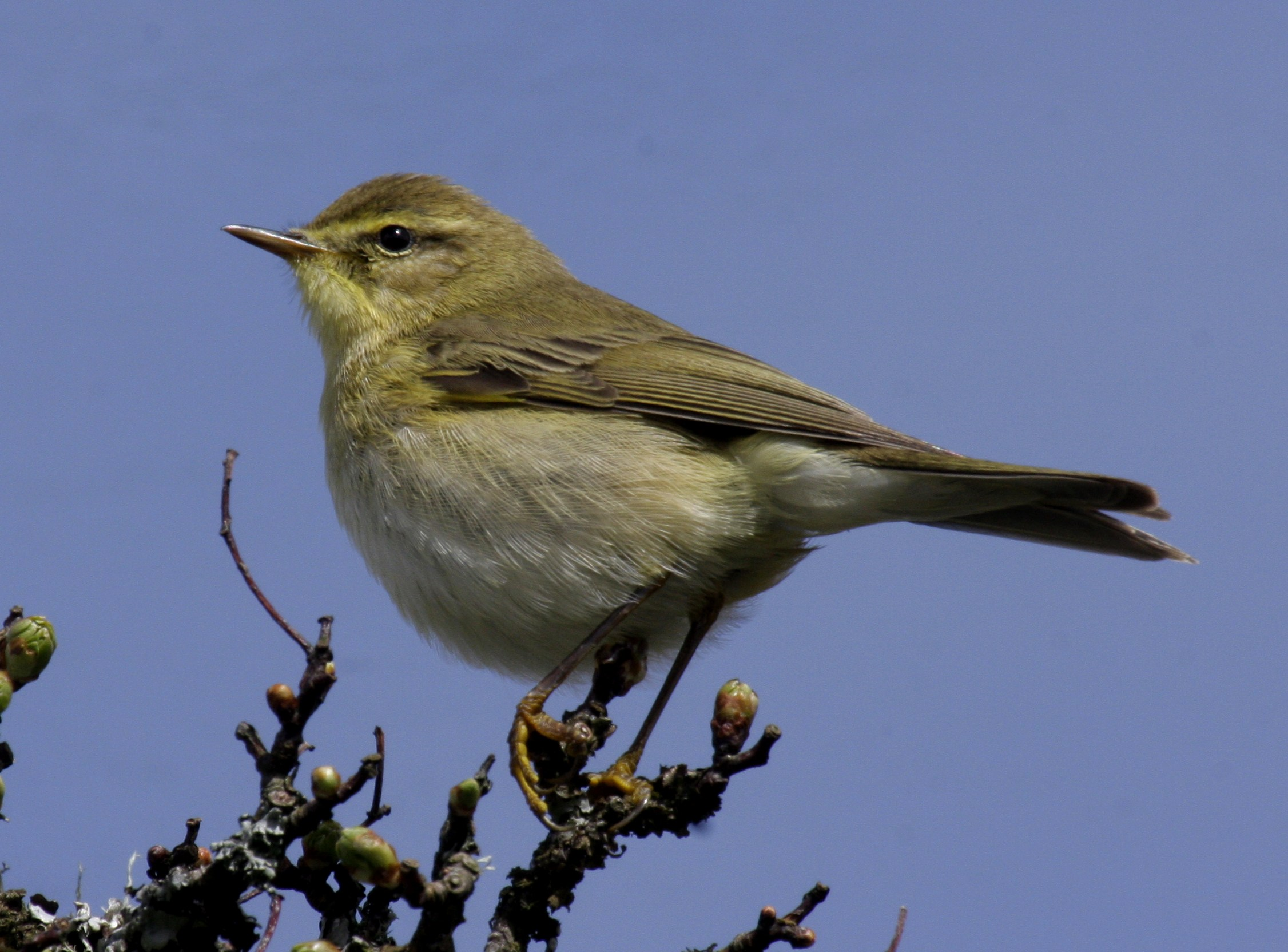
Willow warbler

Common name	Binomial	Status
Willow warbler	Phylloscopus trochilus	Abundant breeding summer visitor
Common chiffchaff	Phylloscopus collybita	Common breeding summer visitor, scarce to uncommon in winter
Western Bonelli's warbler	Phylloscopus bonelli	Very rare, BBRC
Wood warbler	Phylloscopus sibilatrix	Scarce on passage, rare breeding
Yellow-browed warbler	Phylloscopus inornatus	Very rare, LROS
Greenish warbler	Phylloscopus trochiloides	Very rare, LROS

== Old World warblers ==
Order: Passeriformes Family: Sylviidae A group of small, insectivorous passerine birds. Most are of generally undistinguished appearance, but many have distinctive songs.

Common name	Binomial	Status
Eurasian blackcap	Sylvia atricapilla	Common breeding summer visitor, uncommon in winter
Barred warbler	Sylvia nisoria	Very rare vagrant. One record in 2018 LROS
Garden warbler	Sylvia borin	Fairly common breeding summer visitor
Whitethroat	Sylvia communis	Common breeding summer visitor
Lesser whitethroat	Sylvia curruca	Fairly common breeding summer visitor

== Kinglets ==
Order: Passeriformes Family: Regulidae

A family of very small birds. There are seven species worldwide, with two in Leicestershire and Rutland.

Common name	Binomial	Status
Goldcrest	Regulus regulus	Fairly common to common breeding summer visitor
Common firecrest	Regulus ignicapillus	Rare in winter and on passage

== Old World flycatchers ==
Order: Passeriformes Family: Muscicapidae

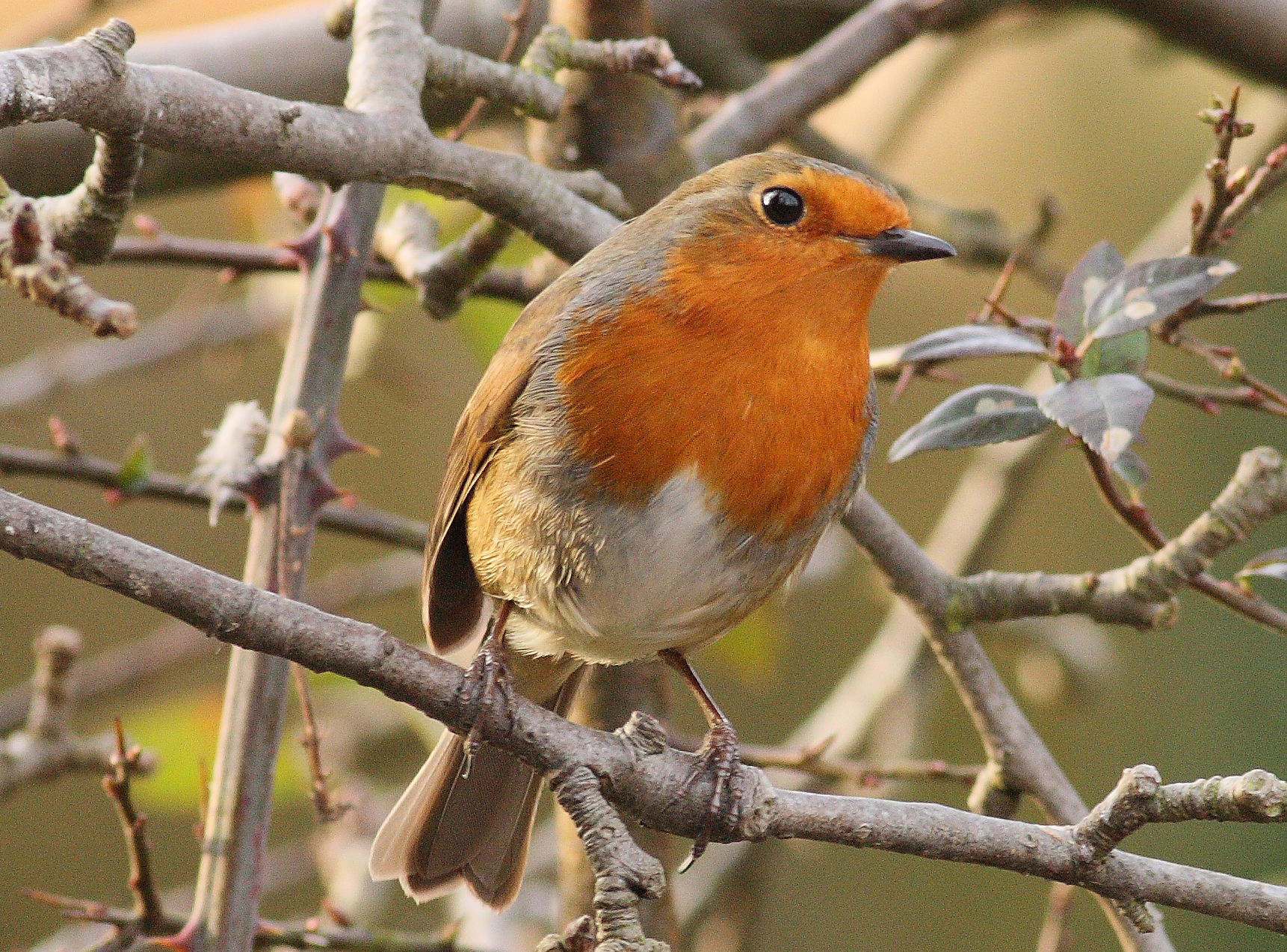
A European robin in a Leicestershire garden, British subspecies Erithacus rubecula melophilus

The flycatchers are small birds that fly out from a perch to catch insects in the air or from the ground. There are about 120 species worldwide, 11 of which have been recorded in Leicestershire and Rutland.

Common name	Binomial	Status
Spotted flycatcher	Muscicapa striata	Uncommon breeding summer visitor
European pied flycatcher	Ficedula hypoleuca	Rare to scarce on passage, very rare breeding
Bluethroat	Luscinia svecica	Very rare, LROS
Nightingale	Luscinia megarhynchos	Uncommon breeding summer visitor
Red-flanked bluetail	Tarsiger cyanurus	Very rare, BBRC
European robin	Erithacus rubecula	Abundant resident breeding
European stonechat	Saxicola rubicola	Uncommon in winter and on passage
Whinchat	Saxicola rubetra	Uncommon on passage, rare breeding
Northern wheatear	Oenanthe oenanthe	Uncommon on passage, very rare breeding
Black redstart	Phoenicurus ochruros	Scarce in winter and on passage, rare breeding
Common redstart	Phoenicurus phoenicurus	Uncommon in summer and on passage, rare breeding

== Bearded reedling ==
Order: Passeriformes Family: Panuridae

Common name	Binomial	Status
Bearded reedling	Panurus biarmicus	Rare in winter and on passage

== Long-tailed tits ==
Order: Passeriformes Family: Aegithalidae

Small, long-tailed birds that typically live in flocks for much of the year. There are eight species worldwide, with one breeding in Leicestershire and Rutland.

Common name	Binomial	Status
Long-tailed tit	Aegithalos longicaudus	Common breeding resident

== Tits ==
Order: Passeriformes Family: Paridae

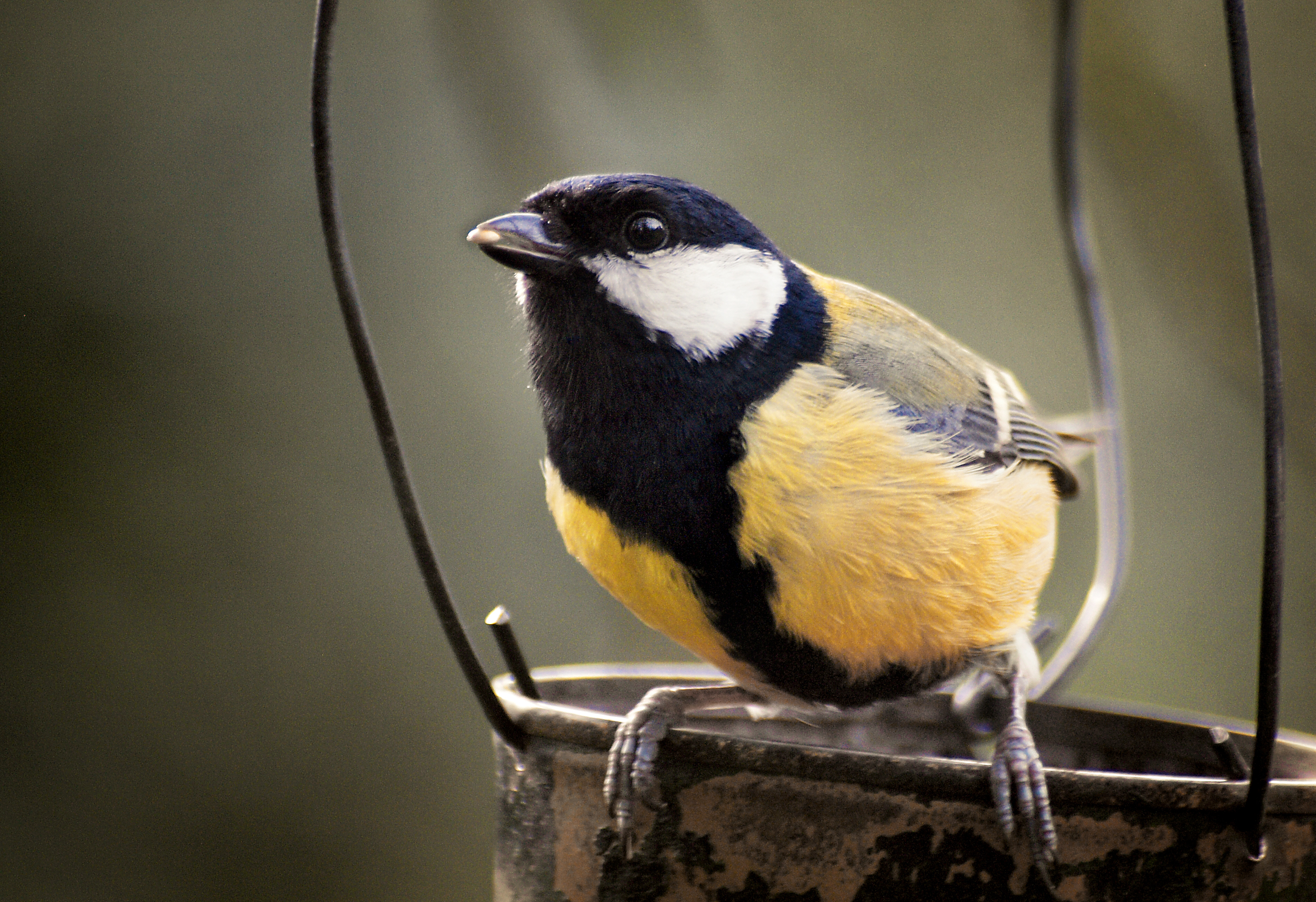
Great tit

Tits are mainly small, stocky, woodland species with short stout bills. They are adaptable birds, with a mixed diet including seeds and insects. There are about 59 species worldwide, five breeding in Leicestershire and Rutland.

Common name	Binomial	Status
Marsh tit	Parus palustris	Fairly common resident breeding
Willow tit	Parus montana	Common but declining resident breeding
Coal tit	Parus ater	Common resident breeding
Great tit	Parus major	Abundant resident breeding
Blue tit	Parus caeruleus	Abundant resident breeding

== Nuthatches ==
Order: Passeriformes Family: Sittidae

Nuthatches are small woodland birds with the unusual ability to climb down trees head-first, unlike other birds which can only go upwards. There are about 24 species worldwide, one breeding in Leicestershire and Rutland.

Common name	Binomial	Status
Eurasian nuthatch	Sitta europaea	Fairly common resident breeding

== Treecreepers ==
Order: Passeriformes Family: Certhiidae

Treecreepers are small woodland birds, brown above and white below. They have thin, pointed, down-curved bills, which they use to extricate insects from bark. There are seven species worldwide, one breeding in Leicestershire and Rutland.

Common name	Binomial	Status
Common treecreeper	Certhia familiaris	Common resident breeding

== Old World orioles ==
Order: Passeriformes Family: Oriolidae

The orioles are medium-sized passerines, mostly with bright and showy plumage, the females often duller plumage than the males The beak is long, slightly curved and hooked. Orioles are arboreal and tend to feed in the canopy. There are 27 species worldwide, one of which has been recorded in Leicestershire and Rutland.

Common name	Binomial	Status
Eurasian golden oriole	Oriolus oriolus	Rare in summer and on passage, LROS

== Shrikes ==
Order: Passeriformes Family: Laniidae

Shrikes are passerine birds with a habit of catching other birds and small animals and impaling the uneaten portions of their bodies on thorns. A typical shrike's beak is hooked, like that of a bird of prey. There are about 30 species worldwide, three of which have been recorded in Leicestershire and Rutland.

Common name	Binomial	Status
Great grey shrike	Lanius excubitor	Rare, LROS
Red-backed shrike	Lanius collurio	Very rare, bred to 1944, LROS
Woodchat shrike	Lanius senator	Very rare, LROS

== Crows and allies ==
Order: Passeriformes Family: Corvidae

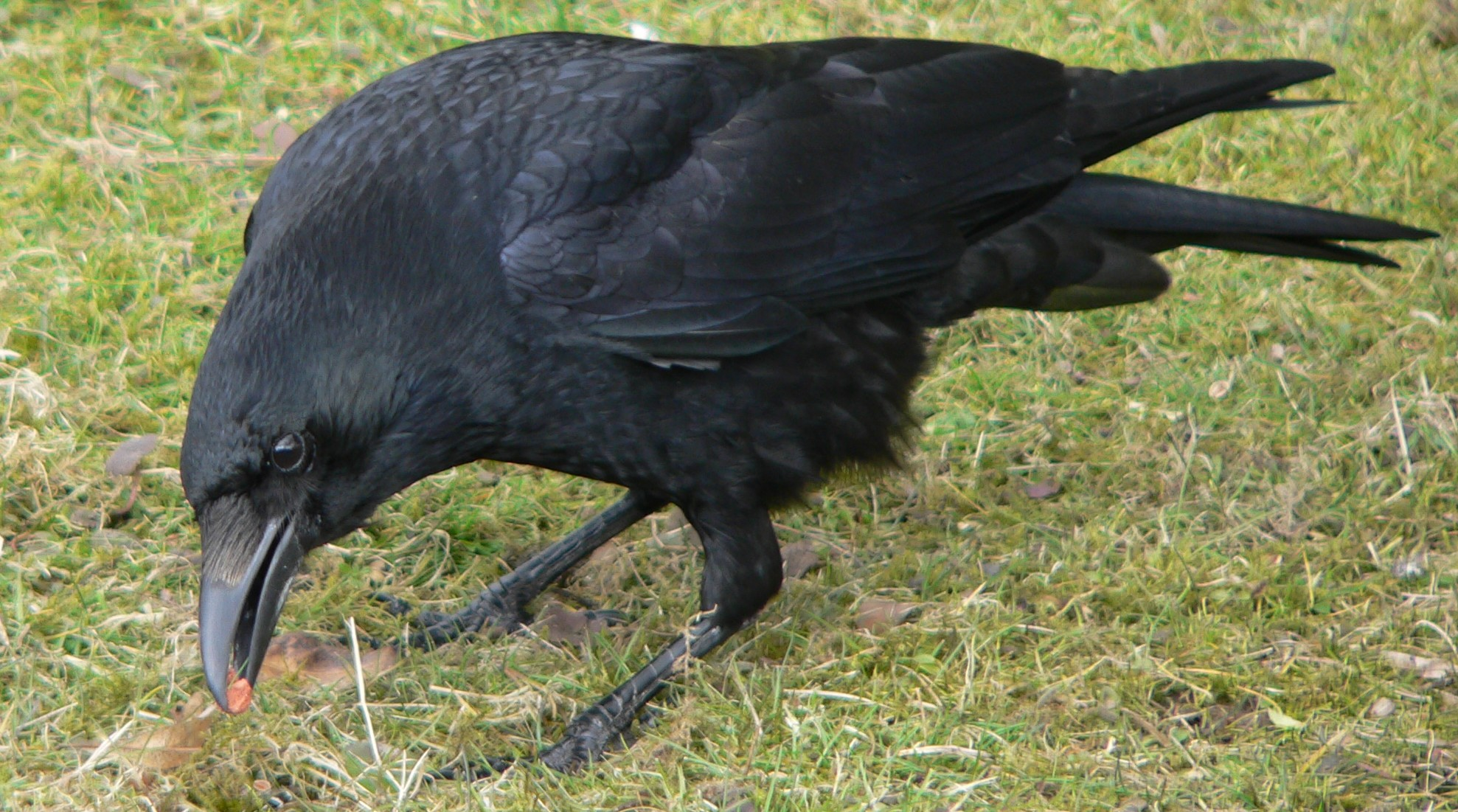
Carrion crow

The crows and their relatives are fairly large birds with strong bills and are usually intelligent and adaptable. There are about 119 species worldwide, eight of which have been recorded in Leicestershire and Rutland.

Common name	Binomial	Status
Carrion crow	Corvus corone	Common resident breeding
Common raven	Corvus corax	Scarce in winter and on passage, rare resident breeding
Hooded crow	Corvus cornix	Very rare, LROS
Eurasian jackdaw	Corvus monedula	Common resident breeding
Rook	Corvus frugilegus	Abundant resident breeding
Eurasian jay	Garrulus glandarius	Fairly common resident breeding
European magpie	Pica pica	Common resident breeding
Spotted nutcracker	Nucifraga caryocatactes	Very rare, BBRC

== Starlings ==
Order: Passeriformes Family: Sturnidae

Starlings are small to medium-sized passerine birds with strong feet. Their flight is strong and direct and most are very gregarious. There are about 114 species worldwide, two of which have been recorded in Leicestershire and Rutland.

Common name	Binomial	Status
Rosy starling	Pastor roseus	Very rare, LROS
Common starling	Sturnus vulgaris	Abundant breeding, in winter and on passage

== Sparrows ==
Order: Passeriformes Family: Passeridae

Sparrows tend to be small, plump, brownish or greyish birds with short tails and short, powerful beaks. They are seed-eaters and they also consume small insects. There are about 38 species worldwide, two of which have been recorded in Leicestershire and Rutland.

Common name	Binomial	Status
House sparrow	Passer domesticus	Common resident breeding
Eurasian tree sparrow	Passer montanus	Fairly common resident breeding

== Finches ==
Order: Passeriformes Family: Fringillidae

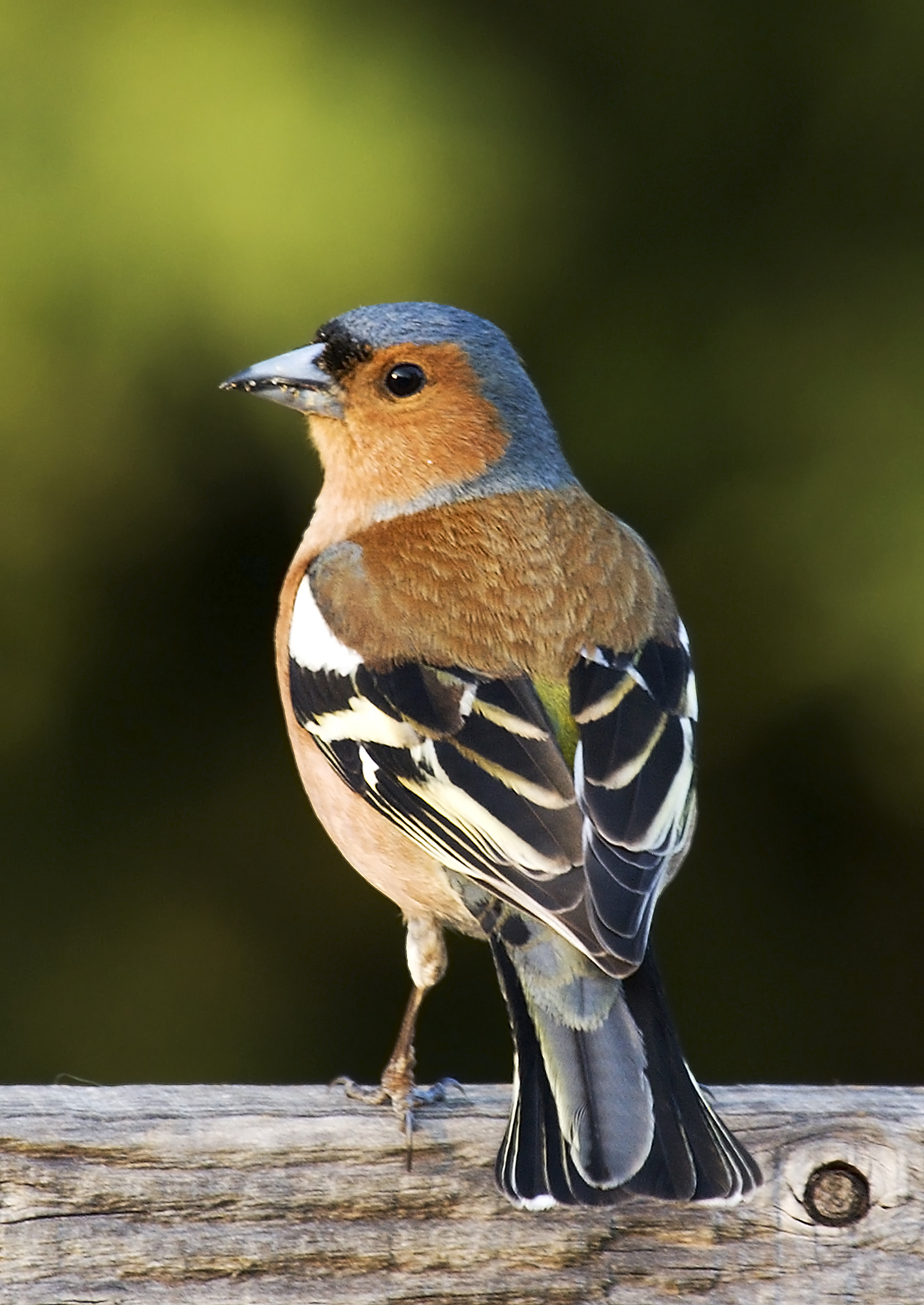
Male common chaffinch

Seed-eating passerine birds that are small to moderately large and have a strong beak, usually conical and in some species very large. There are about 176 species worldwide, 13 of which have been recorded in Leicestershire and Rutland.

Common name	Binomial	Status
Common chaffinch	Fringilla coelebs	Abundant resident breeding
Brambling	Fringilla montifringilla	Uncommon to fairly common in winter and on passage
Common crossbill	Loxia curvirostra	Rare to scarce in winter, very rare breeding, LROS
European greenfinch	Chloris chloris	Common to abundant resident breeding
Common redpoll	Acanthis flammea	Rare in winter and on passage, LROS
Lesser redpoll	Acanthis cabaret	Fairly common in winter and on passage, rare breeding
Arctic redpoll	Acanthis hornemanni	Very rare, LROS
Eurasian siskin	Spinus spinus	Fairly common to commonin winter, very rarebreeding
European goldfinch	Carduelis carduelis	Common resident breeding
Twite	Linaria flavirostris	Rare in winter and on passage, LROS
Common linnet	Linaria cannabina	Fairly common in winter, common breeding
Eurasian bullfinch	Pyrrhula pyrrhula	Common resident breeding
Hawfinch	Coccothraustes coccothraustes	Scarce on passage, rare breeding

== Longspurs and arctic buntings ==
Order: Passeriformes Family: Calcariidae

Common name	Binomial	Status
Snow bunting	Plectrophenax nivalis	Rare in winter and on passage, LROS
Lapland bunting	Calcarius lapponicus	Very rare in winter and on passage, LROS

== Buntings ==
Order: Passeriformes Family: Emberizidae

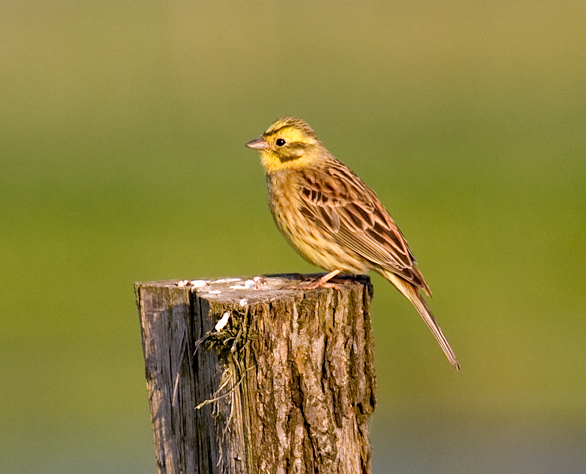
Female yellowhammer

The Emberizidae are a large family of seed-eating passerine birds with distinctively shaped bills. There are about 372 species worldwide, eight of which have been recorded in Leicestershire and Rutland.

Common name	Binomial	Status
Yellowhammer	Emberiza citrinella	Common resident breeding
Cirl bunting	Emberiza cirlus	Very rare, bred to 1920, LROS
Black-headed bunting	Emberiza melanocephala	Very rare, BBRC
Reed bunting	Emberiza schoeniclus	Common resident breeding
Corn bunting	Miliaria calandra	Uncommon resident breeding

== Cited text ==
- Fray, Rob; Davies, Roger; Gamble, Dave; Harrop, Andrew; Lister, Steve (2009). The Birds of Leicestershire and Rutland. Christopher Helm. ISBN 978-0-7136-7233-6.
