= Rutland =

County in England

- Ceremonial county
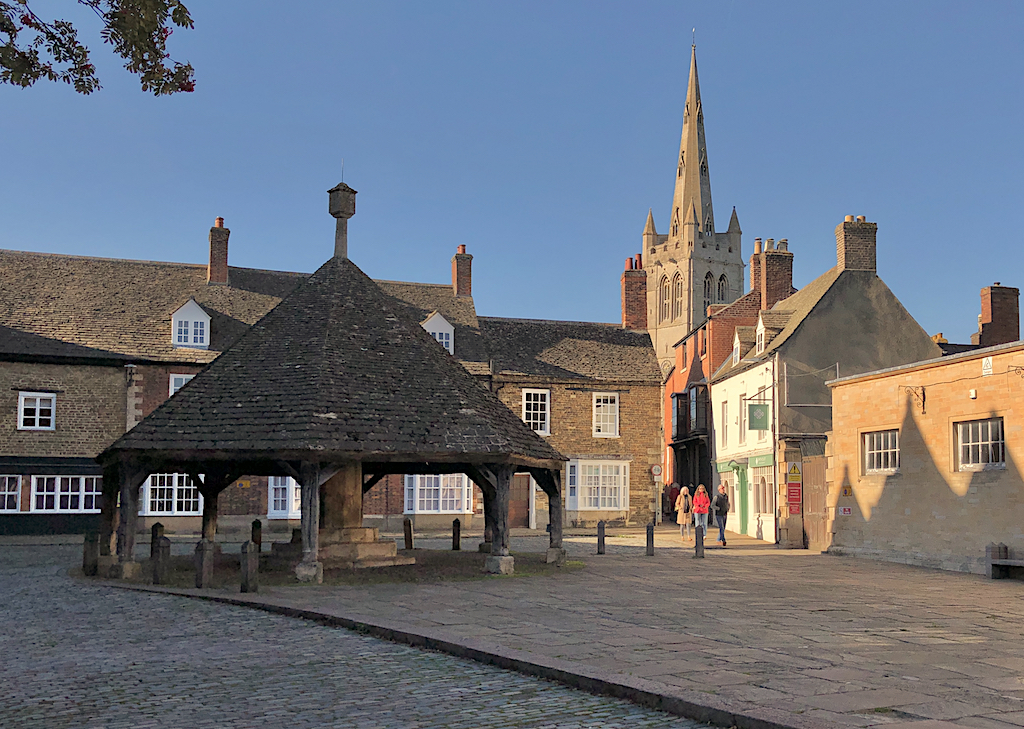
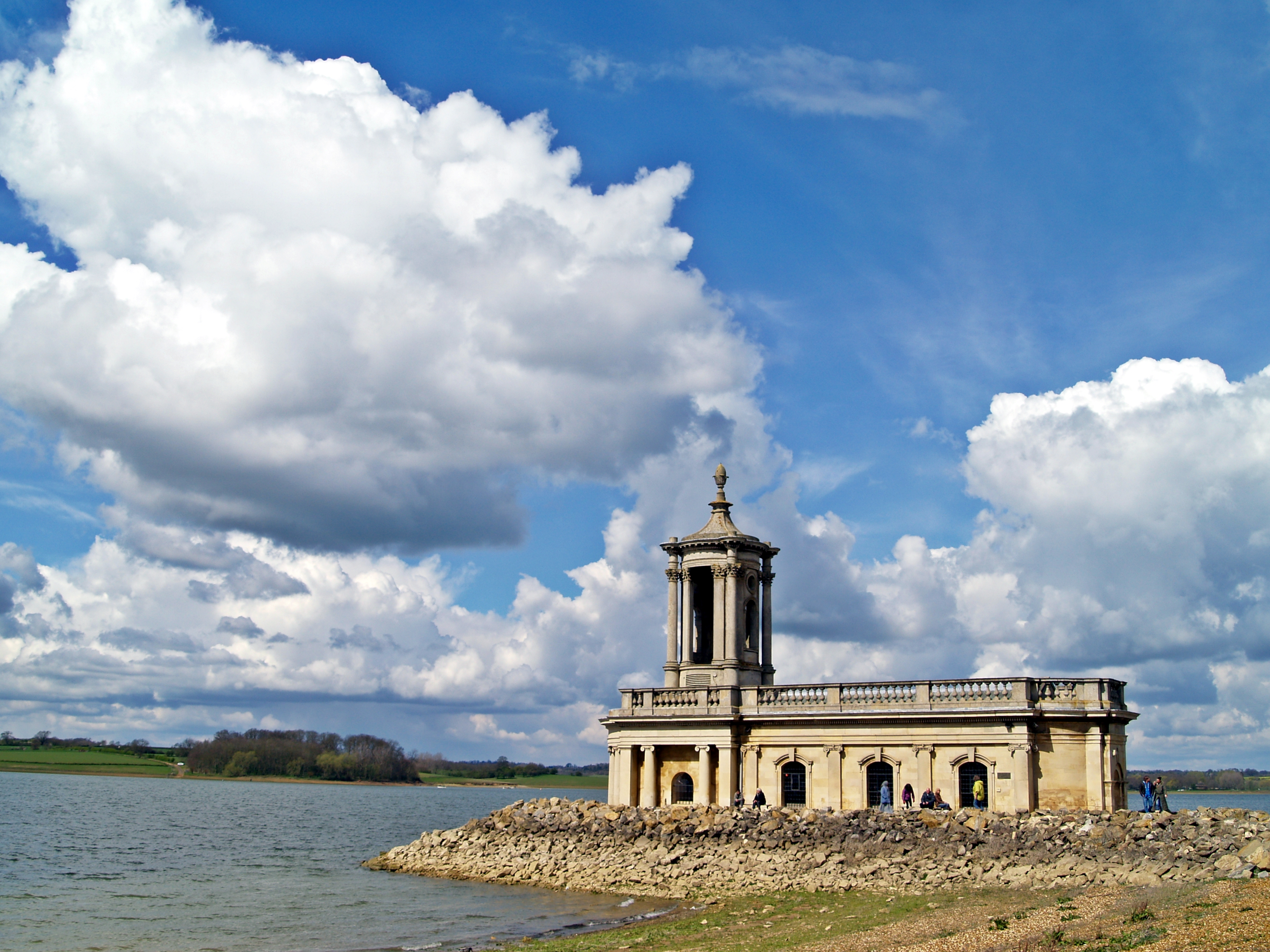
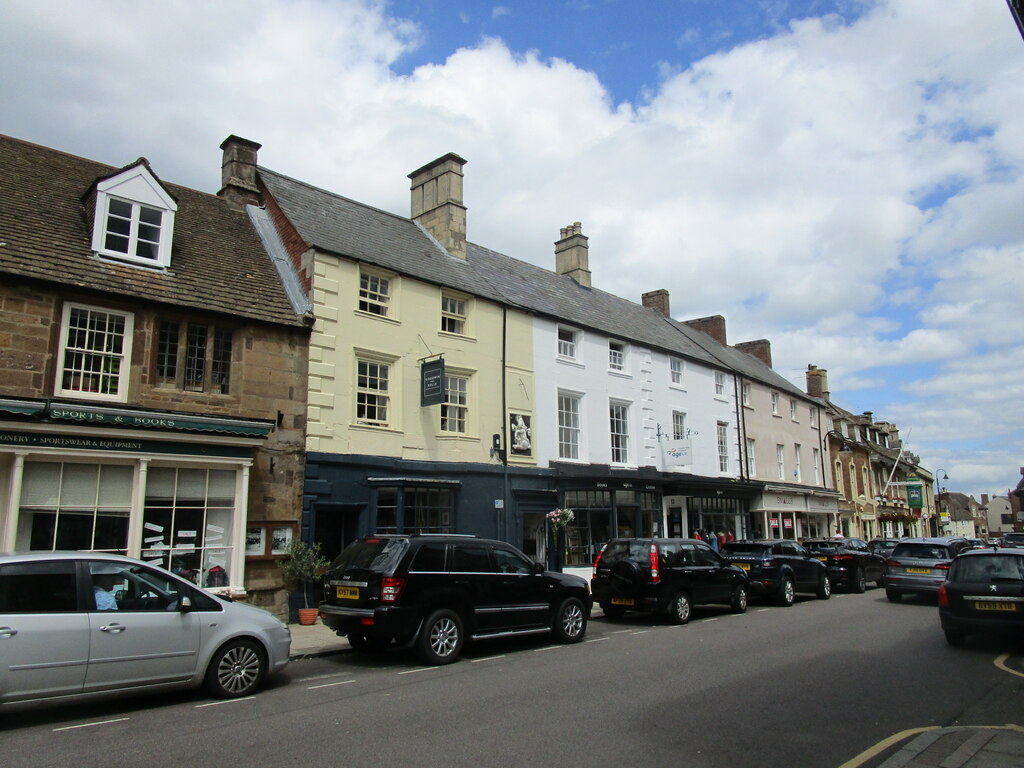
- Oakham Buttercross; Rutland Water and Normanton Church; Uppingham High Street East.

- Rutland within England
- Sovereign state: United Kingdom
- Constituent country: England
- Region: East Midlands
- Established: 1 April 1997
- Established by: Local Government Commission for England
- Origin: Ancient
- Time zone: UTC+0 (GMT)
  - Summer (DST): UTC+1 (BST)
- UK Parliament: Alicia Kearns (C)
- Police: Leicestershire Police
- Ceremonial county
- Lord Lieutenant: Sarah Furness
- High Sheriff: Susannah Kate Constance Fish
- Area: 382 km^{2} (147 sq mi)
  - Rank: 45th of 48
- Population (2024): 41,443
  - Rank: 47th of 48
  - Density: 109/km^{2} (280/sq mi)
- Unitary authority
- Council: Rutland County Council
- Control: No overall control
- Admin HQ: Oakham
- Area: 382 km^{2} (147 sq mi)
  - Rank: 89th of 296
- Population (2025): 41,629
  - Rank: 294th of 296
  - Density: 109/km^{2} (280/sq mi)
- ISO 3166-2: GB-RUT
- GSS code: E06000017
- ITL: UKF22
- Website: www.rutland.gov.uk

Rutland (Note: The county was sometimes archaically called Rutlandshire.) is a ceremonial county in the East Midlands of England. It borders Leicestershire to the north and west, Lincolnshire to the north-east, and Northamptonshire to the south-west.

Rutland has an area of 382 km^{2} (147 sq mi) and had an estimated population of 41,443 in 2024, the second-smallest ceremonial county population after the City of London. The county is rural, and the only towns are Oakham in the west and Uppingham in the south; its villages include Cottesmore in the north and Ketton in the east. For local government purposes Rutland is a unitary authority area. The county was the smallest of the historic counties of England.

The geography of Rutland is characterised by low, rolling hills, the highest of which is a 197 m (646 ft) point in Cold Overton Park. Rutland Water was created in the centre of the county in the 1970s; the reservoir is a nature reserve that serves as an overwintering site for wildfowl and a breeding site for ospreys.

There is little evidence of prehistoric settlement in Rutland; however, a Roman mosaic and probable farming complex is located west of the village of Ketton. The area was settled by the Angles from the 5th century and later formed part of the kingdom of Mercia. Rutland was first mentioned as a distinct county in 1179, and during the High Middle Ages much of it was forested and used as hunting grounds. The wool trade was important during the 16th century. The older buildings in the county are built from local limestone or ironstone, and many have roofs of Collyweston stone slate or thatch. Rutland's main industry is agriculture, and there is a limestone quarry near Ketton.

== History ==
=== Etymology ===
Rutland is referred to as Roteland in the Domesday Book (completed in 1086). The name means "land belonging to Rōta", with Rōta being an Old English personal name that meant 'the pleasant or cheerful one'.

=== Early history – 1974 ===
Earl of Rutland and Duke of Rutland are titles in the peerage of England held in the Manners family, derived from the historic county of Rutland. The Earl of Rutland was elevated to the status of Duke in 1703 and the titles were merged. The family seat is Belvoir Castle, Leicestershire.

The office of High Sheriff of Rutland was instituted in 1129, and there has been a Lord Lieutenant of Rutland since at least 1559. Oakham Castle was built c. 1180–1190 and is "one of the nation’s best-preserved Norman buildings" and is a Grade I listed building. By the 19th century it had been divided into the hundreds of Alstoe, East Rutland, Martinsley, Oakham and Wrandike.

Rutland covered parts of three poor law unions and rural sanitary districts (RSDs): those of Oakham, Uppingham and Stamford. The registration county of Rutland contained the entirety of Oakham and Uppingham RSDs, which included several parishes in Leicestershire and Northamptonshire – the eastern part in Stamford RSD was included in the Lincolnshire registration county. Under the Poor Laws, Oakham Union workhouse was built in 1836–37 at a site to the north-east of the town, with room for 100 paupers. The building later operated as the Catmose Vale Hospital, and now forms part of the Oakham School.

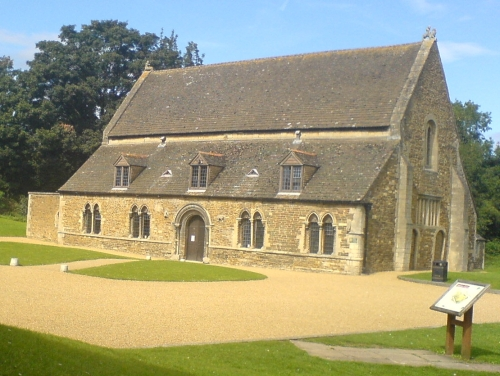
Oakham Castle

In 1894, under the Local Government Act 1894, the rural sanitary districts were partitioned along county boundaries to form three rural districts. The part of Oakham and Uppingham RSDs in Rutland formed the Oakham Rural District and Uppingham Rural District, with the two parishes from Oakham RSD in Leicestershire becoming part of the Melton Mowbray Rural District, the nine parishes of Uppingham RSD in Leicestershire becoming the Hallaton Rural District, and the six parishes of Uppingham RSD in Northamptonshire becoming Gretton Rural District. Meanwhile, that part of Stamford RSD in Rutland became the Ketton Rural District.

Oakham Urban District was created from Oakham Rural District in 1911. It was subsequently abolished in 1974.

==== Plans for reorganisation ====
Rutland was included in the "East Midlands General Review Area" of the 1958–67 Local Government Commission for England. Draft recommendations would have seen Rutland split, with Ketton Rural District going along with Stamford to a new administrative county of Cambridgeshire, and the western part added to Leicestershire. The final proposals were less radical and instead proposed that Rutland become a single rural district within the administrative county of Leicestershire. There was fierce local opposition to the plans, with even the local Conservative Party branch campaigning against it; the campaign included successful publicity stunts such as mounting a pretend battleship called HMS Rutland on a lorry and shooting fireworks at the offices of Leicestershire County Council, where the commissioners were based.

On 1 August 1963 the Minister of Housing and Local Government, Sir Keith Joseph, announced that the proposed merger with Leicestershire would not be implemented, citing Rutland's case as "unique", while the opposition alleged that cancelling the merger was a purely political consideration seeking to appease Tory voters in Rutland who did not want to see their county lose its status. The historian Alexander Hutton suggests that the 1962 by-elections in Orpington (where the Liberal Party successfully campaigned as a protest vote against local government reorganisation) and Leicester North East (where Conservative activists from Rutland and Leicestershire refused to campaign, instead endorsing the Liberals) caused the Conservative government to reverse their decision regarding Rutland.

=== District of Leicestershire (1974–1997) ===
Rutland became a non-metropolitan district of Leicestershire under the Local Government Act 1972, which took effect on 1 April 1974. The original proposal was for Rutland to be merged with what is now the Melton borough, as Rutland did not meet the requirement of having a population of at least 40,000. The revised and implemented proposals allowed Rutland to be exempt from this.

=== Unitary authority (1997–present) ===
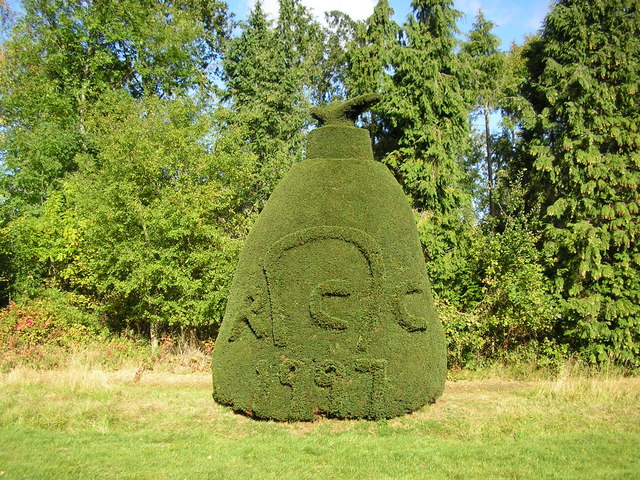
Topiary with date at Clipsham Yew Tree Avenue, marking Rutland's re-establishment in 1997

In 1994 the Local Government Commission for England, which was conducting a structural review of English local government, recommended that Rutland become a unitary authority. This was implemented on 1 April 1997, when Rutland County Council became responsible for almost all local services in Rutland, with the exception of the Leicestershire Fire and Rescue Service and Leicestershire Police, which are run by joint boards with Leicestershire County Council and Leicester City Council. Rutland regained a separate lieutenancy and shrievalty, and thus also regained status as a ceremonial county.

Rutland was a postal county until Royal Mail integrated it into the Leicestershire postal county in 1974. After a lengthy campaign, and despite counties no longer being required for postal purposes, Royal Mail agreed to re-create a postal county of Rutland in 2007. This was achieved in January 2008 by amending the former postal county for all of the Oakham (LE15) post town and a small part of the Market Harborough (LE16) post town.

== Geography ==
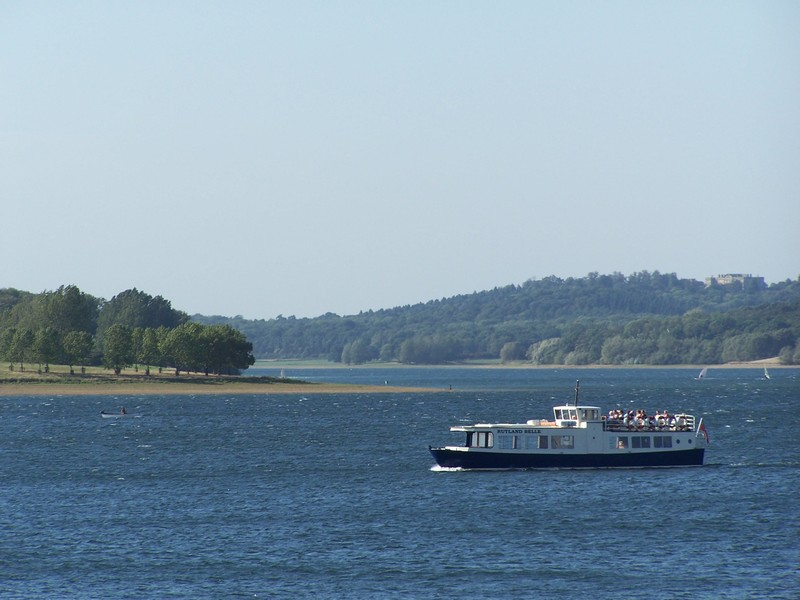
Rutland Water

The particular geology of the area has given its name to the Rutland Formation, which was formed from muds and sand carried down by rivers and occurring as bands of different colours, each with many fossil shells at the bottom. The formation has also preserved a well-preserved specimen of the sauropod dinosaur Cetiosaurus oxienensis at Great Casterton, currently on display at Leicester Museum & Art Gallery. At the bottom of the Rutland Formation is a bed of dirty white sandy silt. Under the Rutland Formation is a formation called the Lincolnshire limestone. The best exposure of this limestone (and also the Rutland Formation) is at the Ketton Cement Works quarry just outside Ketton.

Rutland is dominated by Rutland Water, a large artificial lake formerly known as Empingham Reservoir, in the middle of the county, which is almost bisected by the Hambleton Peninsula. The west part is in the Vale of Catmose. Rutland Water, when construction started in 1971, became the largest man-made lake in Europe; construction was completed in 1975, and filling the lake took a further four years. This has been voted Rutland's favourite tourist attraction.

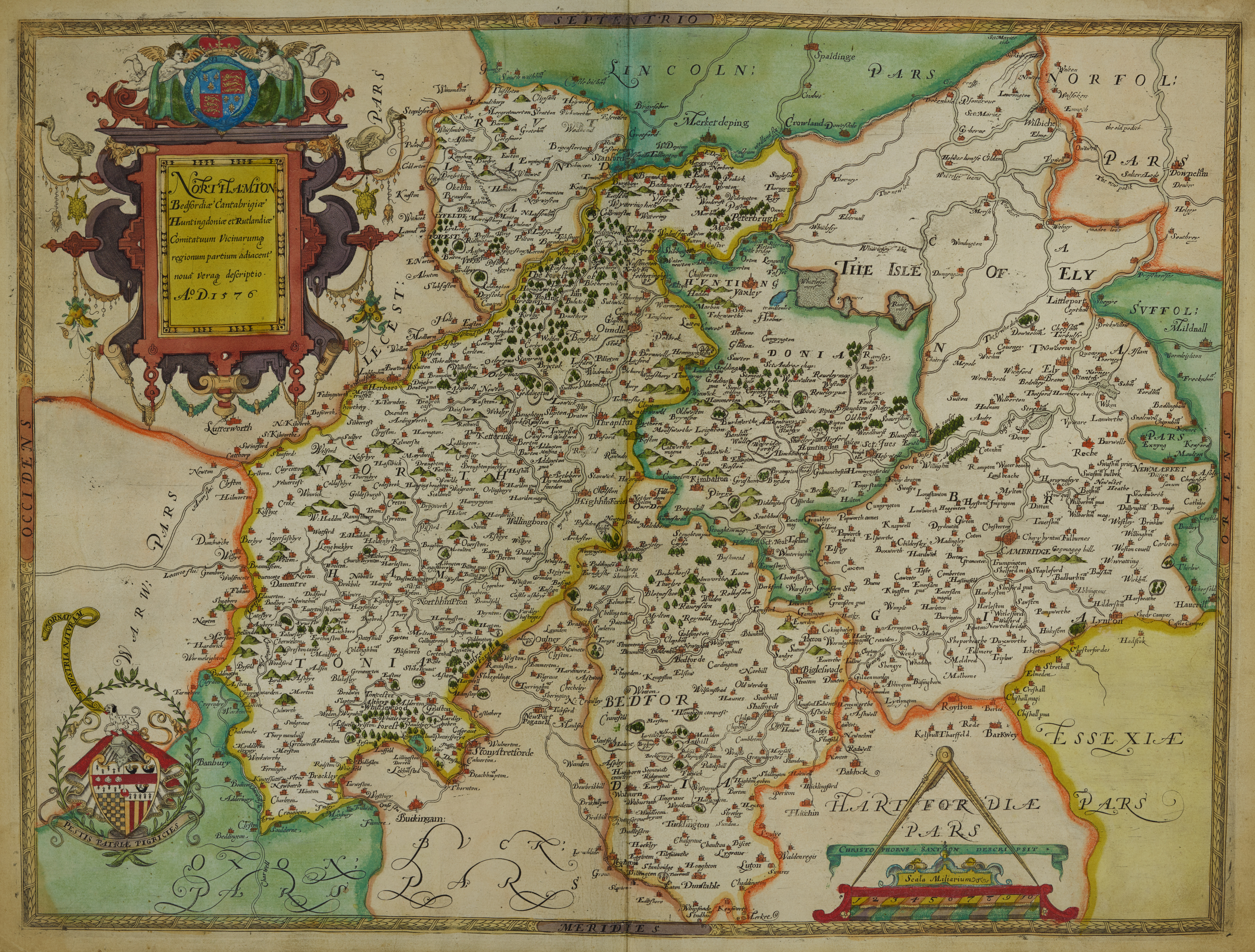
Hand-drawn map of Northamptonshire, Bedfordshire, Cambridgeshire, Huntingdonshire and Rutland by Christopher Saxton, 1576

The highest point of the county is at Cold Overton Park (historically part of Flitteriss Park) at 197 m (646 ft) above sea level close to the west border (OS Grid reference: SK8271708539). The lowest point is close to the east border, in secluded farmland at North Lodge Farm, northeast of Belmesthorpe, at just 17 m (56 feet) above sea level (OS Grid reference: TF056611122); this corner of the county is on the edge of The Fens and is drained by the West Glen.

=== Rivers ===
- River Chater
- Eye Brook
- River Gwash
- River Welland

== Economy ==
There are 17,000 people of working age in Rutland, of which the highest percentage (30.8%) work in Public Administration, Education and Health, closely followed by 29.7% in Distribution, Hotels and Restaurants and 16.7% in Manufacturing industries. Significant employers include Lands' End in Oakham and the Ketton Cement Works. Other employers in Rutland include two Ministry of Defence bases – Kendrew Barracks (formerly RAF Cottesmore) and St George's Barracks (previously RAF North Luffenham), two public schools – Oakham and Uppingham – and HM Prison Stocken. HM Prison Ashwell closed at the end of March 2011 after a riot and government review but, having been purchased by Rutland County Council, has now been turned into Oakham Enterprise Park. The county used to supply iron ore to Corby steel works but these quarries closed in the 1960s and early 1970s resulting in the famous walk of "Sundew" (the Exton quarries' large walking dragline) from Exton to Corby, which even featured on the children's television series Blue Peter. Agriculture thrives with much wheat farming on the rich soil. Tourism continues to grow.

The Ruddles Brewery was Langham's biggest industry until it was closed in 1997. Rutland bitter is one of only three UK beers to have achieved Protected Geographical Indication status; this followed an application by Ruddles. When Greene King, the owners of Ruddles, closed the Langham brewery it was unable to take advantage of the registration. However, in 2010 a Rutland Bitter was launched by Oakham's Grainstore Brewery.

It is 348th out of 354 on the Indices of Deprivation for England, showing it to be one of the least economically deprived areas in the country.

In March 2007 Rutland became only the fourth Fairtrade county.

This is a chart of trend of regional gross value added of the non-metropolitan county of Leicestershire and Rutland at current basic prices with figures in millions of pounds sterling.

Year	Regional gross value added	Agriculture	Industry	Services
1995	6,666	145	2,763	3,758
2000	7,813	112	2,861	4,840
2003	9,509	142	3,045	6,321

includes hunting and forestry

includes energy and construction

includes financial intermediation services indirectly measured

Components may not sum to totals due to rounding.

As far as the National Health Service is concerned Rutland is generally treated as part of Leicestershire.

== Politics and subdivisions ==
The coat of arms of Rutland County Council. The council's banner of arms is used as an unofficial flag of Rutland

=== Rutland County Council ===
Rutland County Council is a unitary authority and is responsible for almost all local services in Rutland, with the exception of the Leicestershire Fire and Rescue Service and Leicestershire Police, which are run by joint boards with Leicestershire County Council and Leicester City Council.

Following the 2023 council elections, the Liberal Democrats emerged as the largest group and subsequently formed a cabinet led by Gale Waller.

==== Future ====
In July 2026, the UK Government announced that it intended to reorganise local government in Rutland by April 2028. The county would become part of a new unitary authority area, called Leicestershire and Rutland, which would also include the majority of Leicestershire. A shadow election to the new unitary authority was to be held in May 2027 and come into full existence on April 2028. In September 2026 the government announced that the proposals were being placed on hold for a review of the process; local elections in May 2027 will take place for the existing local authorities. In October 2026, plans to create Leicestershire and Rutland were withdrawn. The previous decision was threatened with judicial review by five of the Leicestershire district councils.

=== Wards ===
As of the May 2019 elections, there are 27 councillors representing 15 wards on Rutland County Council. They represent a mixture of one-, two- and three-person wards.

Parliamentary constituency	Ward	Councillor	Party	Term of office
Rutland and Melton constituency	Barleythorpe	David Blanksby	Independent	2019–23
Rutland and Melton constituency	Barleythorpe	Sue Webb	Independent	2019-23
Rutland and Melton constituency	Braunston & Martinsthorpe	Edward Baines	Conservative	2019–23
Rutland and Melton constituency	Braunston & Martinsthorpe	William Cross	Conservative	2019-23
Rutland and Melton constituency	Cottesmore	Samantha Harvey	Conservative	2019-23
Rutland and Melton constituency	Cottesmore	Abigail McCartney	Liberal Democrats	2019–23
Rutland and Melton constituency	Exton	June Fox	Conservative	2016–23
Rutland and Melton constituency	Greetham	Nick Begy	Conservative	2019-23
Rutland and Melton constituency	Ketton	Gordon Brown	Conservative	2019-23
Rutland and Melton constituency	Ketton	Karen Payne	Conservative	2019–23
Rutland and Melton constituency	Langham	Oliver Hemsley	Conservative	2019-23
Rutland and Melton constituency	Lyddington	Andrew Brown	Independent	2019-23
Rutland and Melton constituency	Normanton	Kenneth Bool	Conservative	2019-23
Rutland and Melton constituency	Normanton	Gale Waller	Liberal Democrats	2019-23
Rutland and Melton constituency	Oakham North East	Jeff Dale	Independent	2019–23
Rutland and Melton constituency	Oakham North East	Alan Walters	Independent	2019-23
Rutland and Melton constituency	Oakham North West	Paul Ainsley	Conservative	2019–23
Rutland and Melton constituency	Oakham North West	Leah Toseland	Labour	2021-23
Rutland and Melton constituency	Oakham South	Joanna Burrows	Liberal Democrats	2019–23
Rutland and Melton constituency	Oakham South	Paul Browne	Liberal Democrats	2022-23
Rutland and Melton constituency	Oakham South	Ray Payne	Liberal Democrats	2022-23
Rutland and Melton constituency	Ryhall and Casterton	Richard Coleman	Conservative	2019-23
Rutland and Melton constituency	Ryhall and Casterton	David Wilby	Conservative	2019-23
Rutland and Melton constituency	Uppingham	Stephen Lambert	Liberal Democrats	2022-23
Rutland and Melton constituency	Uppingham	Marc Oxley	Independent	2019-23
Rutland and Melton constituency	Uppingham	Lucy Stephenson	Conservative	2019–23
Rutland and Melton constituency	Whissendine	Rosemary Powell	Independent	2019-23

=== Parliamentary constituency ===
Rutland formed a Parliamentary constituency on its own until 1918, when it became part of the Rutland and Stamford constituency, along with Stamford in Lincolnshire. From 1983 to 2024 it formed part of the Rutland and Melton constituency along with Melton borough and part of Harborough district from Leicestershire. Following the 2023 Periodic Review of Westminster constituencies, Rutland and Stamford was re-established for the 2024 general election.

As at the 2024 general election, Alicia Kearns of the Conservative Party is the member of Parliament for Rutland and Stamford, having received 43.7% of the vote.

=== Civil parishes ===
The county comprises 57 civil parishes, which range considerably in size and population, from Martinsthorpe (nil population) to Oakham (10,922 residents at the 2011 census).

== Demographics ==
The population at the 2011 census was 37,369, a rise of 8% on the 2001 total of 34,563. The population saw a nearly 10% increase in the population at the 2021 census with a recorded population of 41,049.

Year	Population
1831	19,380
1861	21,861
1871	22,073
1881	21,434
1891	20,659
1901	19,709
1991	33,228
2001	34,560
2011	37,400
2021	41,049

At the 2021 census the demographics for the county were recorded as follow:

Rutland had a recorded population of 41,049 at the 2021 census, an increase from the previous population recorded of 37,369 at the 2011 census and 34,563 at the 2001 census. At the 2021 census there was an estimated 21,072 men and 19,977 women living in Rutland.

The county had an ethnicity makeup at the 2021 census of:

- 94.8% White - 38,909
- 1.5% Asian - 647
- 1.3% Black - 552
- 1.8% mixed - 744
- 0.5% other - 198

The county's religious makeup at the 2021 census was:

- 55.4% Christianity - 22,728
- 37.1% no religion - 15,239
- 0.6% Islam - 258
- 0.2% Sikhism - 67
- 0.3% Hinduism - 125
- 0.4% Buddhism - 150
- 0.1% Judaism - 53
- 0.5% other - 201
- 5.4% not stated - ???

In 2006 it was reported that Rutland has the highest fertility rate of any English county – the average woman having 2.81 children, compared with only 1.67 in Tyne and Wear.

In December 2006 Sport England published a survey which revealed that residents of Rutland were the 6th most active in England in sports and other fitness activities. 27.4% of the population participate at least 3 times a week for 30 minutes.

In 2012 the well-being report by the Office for National Statistics found Rutland to be the "happiest county" in the mainland UK.

== Transport ==
A small part of the East Coast Main Line passes through Rutland's north-east corner, near Essendine. It was on this stretch that a train pulled by the locomotive Mallard set the world speed record for steam locomotives on 3 July 1938, with a speed of 125.55 mph (202.05 km/h).

Rutland was the last county in England without a direct rail service to London (apart from the Isle of Wight and several administrative counties which are unitary authorities). East Midlands Trains started running a single service from Oakham railway station to London St Pancras via Corby on 27 April 2009.

Through the Rutland Electric Car Project, Rutland was the first county to offer a county-wide public electric-vehicle charging network.

== In popular culture ==
Rutland's small size has led to a number of humorous references such as Rutland Weekend Television, a television comedy sketch series hosted by Eric Idle, a member of the comedy group Monty Python. The county is the supposed home of the parody rock band the Rutles, who first appeared on Rutland Weekend Television.

The events in several of Peter F. Hamilton's novels (including Misspent Youth and Mindstar Rising) are situated in Rutland, where the author lives. Adam Croft is writing the Rutland crime series, beginning with What Lies Beneath (2020).

Rutland was the last English county without a branch of the American fast-food chain McDonald's. However, in January 2020 a planning application for a McDonald's restaurant on the outskirts of Oakham was approved by the County Council, and it opened on 4 November 2020.

== Traditions ==
Rutland's traditions include:

- Letting of the Banks (Whissendine): The Banks are pasture land and the letting traditionally occurs in the third week of March
- Rush Bearing and Rush Strewing (Barrowden): Reeds are gathered in the church meadow on the eve of St Peter's Day and placed on the church floor (late June, early July)
- Uppingham Market was granted by Charter in 1281 by Edward I.
- Any royalty or peers passing through Oakham must present a horseshoe to the Lord of the Manor of Oakham. The horseshoe has been Rutland's emblem for hundreds of years.

== Education ==
Rutland is home to many state and independent schools.

State schools include Catmose College, Uppingham Community College and Casterton College for secondary education and Harington School for sixth form.

Independent, fee-paying schools include Uppingham School and Oakham School, offering both secondary education and sixth form.

== Media ==
Rutland’s local news and television programmes are provided by BBC East Midlands and ITV Central. Television signals are received from the Waltham TV transmitter.

Rutland's local radio stations are BBC Radio Leicester on 104.9 FM, Smooth East Midlands on 106.6 FM, Hits Radio East Midlands on 106.0 FM, Greatest Hits Radio Midlands (which used to be Rutland Radio) on 107.2 FM, Sabras Radio on 91.0 FM and Rutland and Stamford Sound, a community based radio station which broadcast on DAB and online to the county and Stamford in Lincolnshire.

The Rutland Mercury and Rutland Times are the local newspapers that serve the area.

== Places of interest ==
- Barnsdale Gardens
- Lyddington Bede House
- Oakham Castle
- Rutland County Museum, Oakham
- Rutland Railway Museum, Ashwell
- Rutland Water
- Tolethorpe Hall
- The Viking Way
- Rutland Water Nature Reserve

== See also ==
- Flag of Rutland
- High Sheriff of Rutland
- List of birds of Leicestershire and Rutland
- List of English and Welsh endowed schools (19th century)#Rutland
- Lord Lieutenant of Rutland
- Rutland Roman villa
- Kesteven
- Parts of Holland
- Soke of Peterborough

== Bibliography ==
- Phillips, George (1912). Cambridge County Geography of Rutland. University Press. ASIN B00085ZZ5M.
- Rycroft, Simon; Roscoe, Barbara; Rycroft, Simon (1996). "Landscape and Identity at Ladybower Reservoir and Rutland Water". Transactions of the Institute of British Geographers. 21 (3). Blackwell Publishing: 534–551. Bibcode:1996TrIBG..21..534C. doi:10.2307/622595. JSTOR 622595.
- Galitzine, Prince Yuri (1986). Domesday book in Rutland: The Dramatis personae (PDF). Rutland Record Society. Archived from the original (PDF) on 27 January 2012.
