= Cold Overton Park =

Park in Rutland, England

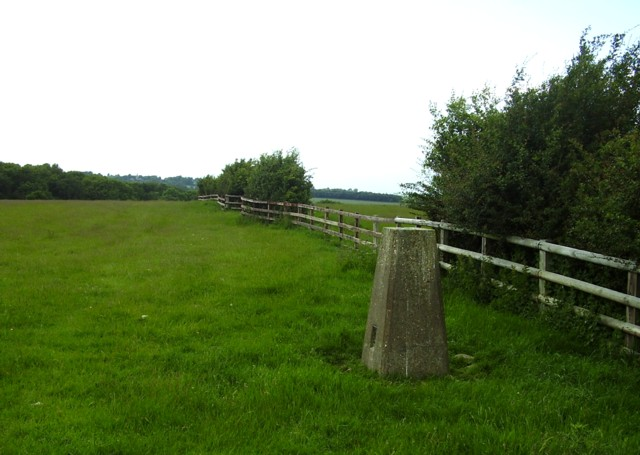
- Cold Overton Park - triangulation pillar

Highest point
- Elevation: 197 m (646 ft)
- Listing: County Top
- Coordinates: 52°40′05″N 0°46′34″W

Geography
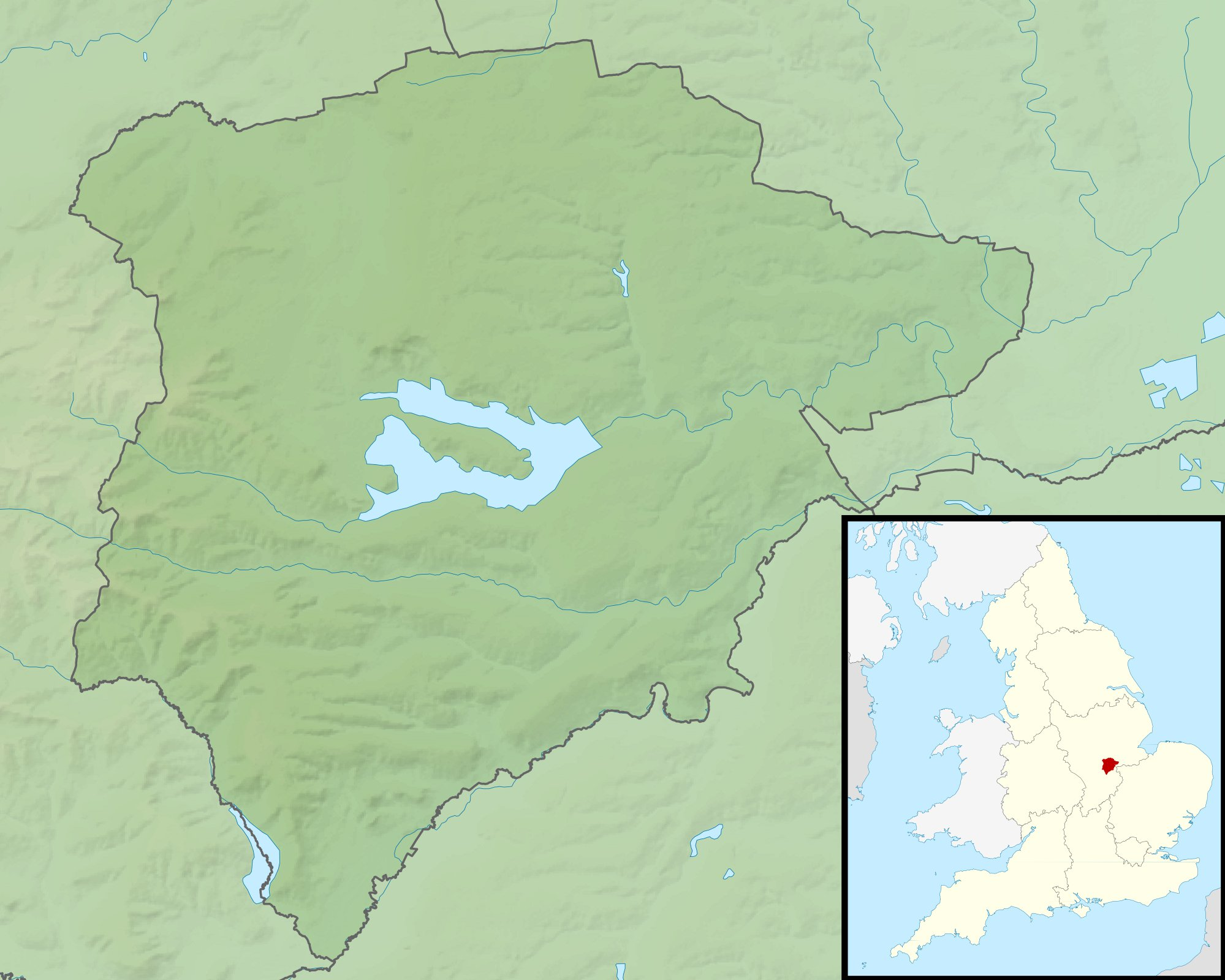
- Location within Rutland
- Location: West of Oakham, England
- OS grid: SK 827 085
- Topo map: OS Landranger 141

A hill with a trig point pillar to the east of Cold Overton Park Wood is, at 197 m (646 ft), the highest point in the county of Rutland, England. The summit is southwest of the Glebe Farm radio relay mast on the road between Oakham and Knossington, and adjacent to the county boundary with Leicestershire. From the peak, there are views of Rutland Water.

It falls within the historic parkland of Flitteriss Park.
