= List of churches in Rutland =

The following is a list of churches in Rutland.

There are no active churches in the civil parishes of Ayston, Barleythorpe, Barrow, Beaumont Chase, Burley, Gunthorpe, Leighfield, Martinsthorpe, Normanton, Thorpe by Water and Wardley. The Church of England parish churches of Ayston, Burley, Normanton and Wardley survive but are redundant. The Churches Conservation Trust maintains Ayston, Burley, Tickencote and Wardley.

The county has an estimated 57 active churches for 38,600 inhabitants, a ratio of one church for every 677 people.

Name	Civil parish	Web	Dedication	Founded	Denomination	Benefice	Notes
St Andrew, Whissendine	Whissendine		Andrew	Medieval	Church of England	Oakham Team	
Holy Trinity, Teigh	Teigh		Trinity	Medieval	Church of England	Oakham Team	
SS Peter & Paul, Market Overton	Market Overton		Peter & Paul	Medieval	Church of England	Oakham Team	
Market Overton Free Church	Market Overton			1994	FIEC		
St Mary, Ashwell	Ashwell		Mary	Medieval	Church of England	Oakham Team	
SS Peter & Paul, Langham	Langham		Peter & Paul	Medieval	Church of England	Oakham Team	
Langham Baptist Church	Langham				Baptist Union		
All Saints, Oakham	Oakham		All Saints	Medieval	Church of England	Oakham Team	
St Joseph, Oakham	Oakham		Joseph	1882	Roman Catholic	Rutland Parish	New church 1975
Oakham Baptist Church	Oakham			pre-1769	Baptist Union		First building 1769
Oakham Methodist Church	Oakham			1811	Methodist	Stamford & Rutland Circuit	New church 1865, 1998
Oakham Congregational Church	Oakham			c. 1662			Current church 1861
St Edmund, Egleton	Egleton		Edmund the Martyr	Medieval	Church of England	Oakham Team	
St Andrew, Hambleton	Hambleton		Andrew	Medieval	Church of England	Oakham Team	
All Saints', Braunston in Rutland	Braunston-in-Rutland		All Saints	Medieval	Church of England	Oakham Team	
St Peter, Brooke	Brooke		Peter	Medieval	Church of England	Oakham Team	
St Nicholas, Cottesmore	Cottesmore		Nicholas	Medieval	Church of England	North Rutland Churches	
St Nicholas, Thistleton	Thistleton		Nicholas	Medieval	Church of England	North Rutland Churches	
St Mary the Virgin, Greetham	Greetham		Mary	Medieval	Church of England	North Rutland Churches	
SS Peter & Paul, Exton	Exton and Horn		Peter & Paul	Medieval	Church of England	North Rutland Churches	
St Thomas of Canterbury Chapel, Exton Hall	Exton and Horn		Thomas Becket		Roman Catholic	Rutland Parish	Private chapel to Exton Hall. Weekly masses
St Nicholas, Stretton	Stretton		Nicholas	Medieval	Church of England	North Rutland Churches	
St Mary, Clipsham	Clipsham		Mary	Medieval	Church of England	North Rutland Churches	
All Saints, Pickworth	Pickworth		All Saints	1816	Church of England	Casterton, Pickworth, Tickencote	
St Peter, Tickencote	Tickencote		Peter	Medieval	Church of England	Casterton, Pickworth, Tickencote	
SS Peter & Paul, Great Casterton	Great Casterton		Peter & Paul	Medieval	Church of England	Casterton, Pickworth, Tickencote	
All Saints, Little Casterton	Little Casterton		All Saints	Medieval	Church of England	Casterton, Pickworth, Tickencote	
St John the Evangelist, Ryhall	Ryhall		John the Evangelist	Medieval	Church of England	Ryhall, Essendine, Carlby	Benefice includes one church in Lincolnshire
Ryhall Methodist Church	Ryhall			1810	Methodist	Stamford & Rutland Circuit	New church 1878
St Mary Magdalene, Essendine	Essendine		Mary Magdalene	Medieval	Church of England	Ryhall, Essendine, Carlby	
St Michael & All Angels, Whitwell	Whitwell		Michael & Angels	Medieval	Church of England	Rutland Water Benefice	
St Peter, Empingham	Empingham		Peter	Medieval	Church of England	Rutland Water Benefice	
Empingham Methodist Church	Empingham			1818	Methodist	Stamford & Rutland Circuit	Current church 1900
St Mary the Virgin, Edith Weston	Edith Weston		Mary	Medieval	Church of England	Rutland Water Benefice	
St John the Baptist, North Luffenham	North Luffenham		John the Baptist		Church of England	Rutland Water Benefice	
St Martin of Tours, Lyndon	Lyndon		Martin of Tours	Medieval	Church of England	Rutland Water Benefice	
St Nicholas, Pilton	Pilton		Nicholas	Medieval	Church of England	Rutland Water Benefice	
St Mary, Manton	Manton		Mary	Medieval	Church of England	Rutland Water Benefice	
SS Peter & Paul, Wing	Wing		Peter & Paul	Medieval	Church of England	Rutland Water Benefice	
SS Peter & Paul, Preston	Preston		Peter & Paul	Medieval	Church of England	Rutland Water Benefice	
SS Mary Magdalene & Andrew, Ridlington	Ridlington		Mary Magdalene & Andrew	Medieval	Church of England	Rutland Water Benefice	
All Saints, Tinwell	Tinwell		All Saints		Church of England	Ketton, Collyweston, Easton, Tinwell	Benefice includes 2 churches in Northamptonshire
St Mary the Virgin, Ketton	Ketton		Mary		Church of England	Ketton, Collyweston, Easton, Tinwell	
Ketton Methodist Church	Ketton			1834	Methodist	Stamford & Rutland Circuit	New church 1864
St Mary the Virgin, South Luffenham	South Luffenham		Mary		Church of England	Welland Fosse Benefice	Benefice includes one church in Northamptonshire
St Luke, Tixover	Tixover		Luke		Church of England	Welland Fosse Benefice	
St Peter, Barrowden	Barrowden		Peter	Medieval	Church of England	Welland Fosse Benefice	
St Mary the Virgin, Morcott	Morcott		Mary	Medieval	Church of England	Welland Fosse Benefice	
St Peter, Belton with Wardley	Belton-in-Rutland		Peter	Medieval	Church of England	Uppingham Benefice	
SS Peter & Paul, Uppingham with Ayston	Uppingham		Peter & Paul	Medieval	Church of England	Uppingham Benefice	
Uppingham Methodist Church	Uppingham			1817	Methodist	Stamford & Rutland Circuit	
St Andrew, Glaston	Glaston		Andrew	Medieval	Church of England	Lyddington etc	Benefice includes one church in Northamptonshire
St John the Baptist, Bisbrooke	Bisbrooke		John the Baptist		Church of England	Lyddington etc	
All Hallows, Seaton	Seaton		All Saints		Church of England	Lyddington etc	
St Andrew, Stoke Dry	Stoke Dry		Andrew	Medieval	Church of England	Lyddington etc	
St Andrew, Lyddington	Lyddington		Andrew	Medieval	Church of England	Lyddington etc	
St John the Evangelist, Caldecott	Caldecott		John the Evangelist	Medieval	Church of England	Lyddington etc	

== Defunct churches ==
Name	Civil parish	Dedication	Founded	Redundant	Denomination	Notes
St Mary the Virgin, Ayston	Ayston	Mary	Medieval	2012	Church of England	Churches Conservation Trust 2014
Holy Cross, Burley	Burley	Holy Cross	Medieval	1984	Church of England	Churches Conservation Trust 1988
St Matthew, Normanton	Normanton	Matthew	1826-1829	1970	Church of England	de-consecrated in 1970
St Botolph, Wardley	Wardley	Botwulf of Thorney	Medieval	2010	Church of England	Churches Conservation Trust 2016
All Saints', Horn	Exton and Horn	All Saints' Day			Church of England	destroyed by 1539
