= List of civil parishes in Rutland =

This is a list of civil parishes in the ceremonial county of Rutland, England.

As of 2019 there are 57 parishes in the county, the whole county is parished. The most recent change to their number was in 2016, with the merger of Exton and Horn.

Population figures are unavailable for some of the smallest parishes.

Civil Parish	Created	Population (2011)	Area (km^{2}) 2011	Pre-1974 District
Ashwell	Ancient	269	7.42	Oakham Rural District
Ayston	Ancient			Uppingham Rural District
Barleythorpe	1866 (prev. chapelry to Oakham)	207	4.02	Oakham Rural District
Barrow	1866 (prev. chapelry to Cottesmore)		9.09	Oakham Rural District
Barrowden	Ancient	506	7.32	Uppingham Rural District
Beaumont Chase	1858 (prev. extra-parochial)			Uppingham Rural District
Belton in Rutland	Medieval (prev. chapelry to Wardley)	348	4.14	Uppingham Rural District
Bisbrooke	Ancient	204	4.62	Uppingham Rural District
Braunston in Rutland	Medieval (prev. chapel to Hambleton)	502	21.73	Oakham Rural District
Brooke	Medieval (prev. chapelry to Oakham)			Oakham Rural District
Burley	Ancient	325	15.74	Oakham Rural District
Caldecott	Medieval (prev. chapel to Liddington)	269	8.00	Uppingham Rural District
Clipsham	Ancient	166	16.82	Ketton Rural District
Cottesmore	Ancient	2,062	14.31	Oakham Rural District
Edith Weston	Ancient	1,359	8.71	Oakham Rural District
Egleton	Medieval (prev. chapelry to Oakham)			Oakham Rural District
Empingham	Ancient	880	18.38	Oakham Rural District
Essendine	Medieval (prev. chapel to Ryhall)	448	5.98	Ketton Rural District
Exton and Horn	2016	607	18.65	Oakham Rural District
Glaston	Ancient	185	4.75	Uppingham Rural District
Great Casterton	Ancient	600	14.56	Ketton Rural District
Greetham	Ancient	638	12.45	Oakham Rural District
Gunthorpe	1866 (prev. chapelry to Oakham)			Oakham Rural District
Hambleton	Ancient	203	8.06	Oakham Rural District
Ketton	Ancient	1,926	13.50	Ketton Rural District
Langham	Medieval (prev. chapelry to Oakham)	1,371	11.82	Oakham Rural District
Leighfield	1858 (prev. extra-parochial)			Oakham Rural District
Little Casterton	Ancient	218	4.95	Ketton Rural District
Lyddington	Ancient	366	8.61	Uppingham Rural District
Lyndon	Ancient	124	5.10	Oakham Rural District
Manton	Ancient	359	8.44	Oakham Rural District
Market Overton	Ancient	584	12.50	Oakham Rural District
Martinsthorpe	Ancient			Oakham Rural District
Morcott	Ancient	321	5.52	Uppingham Rural District
Normanton	Ancient			Oakham Rural District
North Luffenham	Ancient	679	8.23	Uppingham Rural District
Oakham (town)	Ancient	10,922		Oakham Urban District
Pickworth	Ancient			Ketton Rural District
Pilton	Ancient			Uppingham Rural District
Preston	Ancient	173	4.88	Uppingham Rural District
Ridlington	Ancient	260	15.12	Uppingham Rural District
Ryhall	Ancient	1,614	10.83	Ketton Rural District
Seaton	Ancient	250	8.62	Uppingham Rural District
South Luffenham	Ancient	455	5.84	Uppingham Rural District
Stoke Dry	Ancient			Uppingham Rural District
Stretton	Ancient	1,260	13.57	Oakham Rural District
Teigh	Ancient			Oakham Rural District
Thistleton	Ancient			Oakham Rural District
Thorpe by Water	1866			Uppingham Rural District
Tickencote	Ancient			Oakham Rural District
Tinwell	Ancient	234	7.23	Ketton Rural District
Tixover	Medieval (prev. chapelry to Ketton)	163	3.42	Ketton Rural District
Uppingham (town)	Ancient	4,745	7.78	Uppingham Rural District
Wardley	Ancient			Uppingham Rural District
Whissendine	Ancient	1,253	16.30	Oakham Rural District
Whitwell	Ancient			Oakham Rural District
Wing	Ancient	314	4.52	Uppingham Rural District

== Timeline of changes to civil parishes ==
- Parishes reporting births, marriages and deaths in 1837:
  - In the Hundred of Alstow: Ashwell, Barrow, Burley, Cottesmore, Exton, Greetham, Horn, Market Overton, Stretton, Teigh, Thistleton, Whissendine and Whitwell.
  - In the East Hundred: Empingham, Essendine, Great Casterton, Ketton, Little Casterton, Pickworth, Ryhall, Tickencote and Tinwell.
  - In the Hundred of Martinstley: Ayston, Beaumont Chase (extra-parochial), Edith Weston, Hambleton, Lyndon, Manton, Martinsthorpe, Normanton, Preston, Ridlington, Uppingham (part) and Wing.
  - In the Soke of Oakham: Belton, Braunston, Brooke, Clipsham, Egleton, Gunthorpe, Langham, Leighfield (extra-parochial), Oakham Deanshold with Barleythorpe, Oakham Lordship and Wardley.
  - In the Hundred of Wrangdyke: Barrowden, Bisbrooke, Caldecott, Glaston, Lyddington, Morcott, North Luffenham, Pilton, Seaton (part), South Luffenham, Stoke Dry (part), Tixover and Uppingham (part).
- 1858:
  - Beaumont Chase and Leighfield extra-parochial places become civil parishes.
- 1866:
  - Thorpe by Water created out of Seaton, including all of that part of Seaton lying within Northamptonshire, leaving Seaton entirely in Rutland and Thorpe by Water straddling the boundary.
- 25 March 1885:
  - That part of Stoke Dry lying within Leicestershire is transferred to the parish of Stockerston, leaving Stoke Dry entirely in Rutland.
  - That part of Thorpe by Water lying within Northamptonshire is transferred to the parish of Gretton, leaving Thorpe by Water entirely in Rutland.
- 24 March 1887: A detached portion of Essendine is transferred to Carlby in Lincolnshire.
- 1894:
  - Barleythorpe created out of Oakham Deanshold with Barleythorpe.
  - Oakham created by the merger of Oakham Lordship with the remainder of Oakham Deanshold with Barleythorpe.
- 1974: Rutland becomes a district within Leicestershire.
- 21 December 1981: Belton renamed Belton in Rutland.
- 26 October 1987: Braunston renamed Braunston in Rutland.
- 1997: Rutland becomes a unitary authority.
- 1 April 2015: Exton and Horn created by the merger of Exton and Horn.

== See also ==
- List of civil parishes in England
