= List of places in Rutland =

This is a list of towns and villages in the ceremonial county of Rutland, England.

== A ==
- Ashwell
- Ayston

== B ==
- Barleythorpe
- Barrow
- Barrowden
- Beaumont Chase
- Belmesthorpe
- Belton-in-Rutland
- Bisbrooke
- Braunston-in-Rutland
- Brooke
- Burley

== C ==
- Caldecott
- Clipsham
- Cottesmore

== E ==
- Edith Weston
- Egleton
- Empingham
- Essendine
- Exton

== G ==
- Glaston
- Great Casterton
- Greetham
- Gunthorpe

== H ==
- Hambleton
- Horn

== K ==
- Ketton

== L ==
- Langham
- Leighfield
- Little Casterton
- Lyddington
- Lyndon

== M ==
- Manton
- Market Overton
- Martinsthorpe
- Morcott

== N ==
- Normanton
- North Luffenham

== O ==
- Oakham

== P ==
- Pickworth
- Pilton
- Preston

== R ==
- Ridlington
- Ryhall

== S ==
- Seaton
- South Luffenham
- Stoke Dry
- Stretton

== T ==
- Teigh
- Thistleton
- Thorpe by Water
- Tickencote
- Tinwell
- Tixover

== U ==
- Uppingham

== W ==
- Wardley
- Whissendine
- Whitwell
- Wing

== See also ==
- List of settlements in Rutland by population
- List of places in England
