= List of settlements in Rutland by population =

The 13 largest settlements of Rutland, with key towns surrounding the county shown in blue.

This is a list of settlements in Rutland by population based on the results of the 2011 census. In 2011, there were 24 built-up area subdivisions with 250 or more inhabitants in Rutland, shown in the table below.

== List of settlements ==
Rank	Built up area subdivision	Population		Outlying areas detail
Rank	Built up area subdivision	2001	2011	Outlying areas detail
1	Oakham	9,980	10,922	Langham counted separately. Excludes Barleythorpe, Egleton.
2	Uppingham	3,950	4,745	Excludes Ayston, Bisbrooke
3	Ketton	1,666	1,926	Includes Aldgate, Geeston
4	Ryhall	1,482	1,459	Excludes Belmesthorpe
5	Langham	1,042	1,371	
6	Whissendine	1,189	1,273	
7	Cottesmore	1,068	1,067	
8	Cottesmore Airfield / Kendrew Barracks	1,331	995	
9	Empingham	815	880	
10	Edith Weston	650	818	Includes St George's Barracks. Excludes Normanton
11	North Luffenham	704	679	
12	Greetham	609	638	
13	Exton	609	607	
14	Great Casterton	501	600	Excludes Ingthorpe
15	Market Overton	542	584	Excludes Barrow
16	Barrowden	420	506	
17	Braunston-in-Rutland	469	502	
18	South Luffenham	432	455	
19	Essendine	368	448	
20	Lyddington	397	366	
21	Manton	364	359	
22	Belton-in-Rutland	335	348	
23	Morcott	329	321	
24	Seaton	178	250	

Notes: The Office of National Statistics (ONS) subdivide built-up areas into sectors which do not respect administrative or political boundaries. If those areas have a strong city/town/village identity, for population purposes they are classed into a distinct area.

== See also ==
- List of places in Rutland
- List of civil parishes in Rutland
