= Oakham Rural District =

Former local government area in the UK

Coordinates: 52.69°N 0.67°W

Oakham
- Oakham Rural District shown within Rutland in 1970.
- Area
  - 1911: 52,553 acres (212.67 km^{2})
  - 1961: 52,553 acres (212.67 km^{2})
- Population
  - 1901: 6,761
  - 1971: 10,851
- History
  - Origin: Rural sanitary district
  - Created: 1894
  - Abolished: 1974
  - Succeeded by: Rutland
- Status: Rural district
- Government: Oakham Rural District Council
  - HQ: Catmose, Oakham
  - Motto: Parva Componere Magnis (To compare great things with small)
- Subdivisions
  - Type: Civil parishes

Oakham was a rural district in Rutland, England from 1894 to 1974, covering the north of the county.

The rural district had its origins in the Oakham Rural Sanitary District, formed in 1875. Oakham RSD had an identical area to Oakham poor law union, and consisted of thirty-one civil parishes of which twenty-nine were in Rutland and two in Leicestershire.

The Local Government Act 1894 redesignated the area as Oakham Rural District, at the same time transferring the Leicestershire parishes of Cold Overton and Knossington to Melton Mowbray Rural District.

The rural district included the town of Oakham until 1911, when it was constituted as Oakham Urban District.

== Parishes ==
The rural district consisted of the following parishes:

- Ashwell
- Barleythorpe
- Barrow
- Braunston
- Brooke
- Burley
- Cottesmore
- Edith Weston
- Egleton
- Empingham
- Exton
- Greetham
- Gunthorpe
- Hambleton
- Horn
- Langham
- Leighfield
- Lyndon
- Manton
- Martinsthorpe
- Normanton
- Oakham (until 1911)
- Market Overton
- Stretton
- Teigh
- Thistleton
- Tickencote
- Whissendine
- Whitwell

== Premises ==
In its early years, the council met at the Oakham Union Workhouse on Ashwell Road and had its offices spread across various locations.

The council continued to be based in Oakham even after the town was removed from the rural district in 1911. In 1937 the council consolidated its offices and meeting place at Catmose House in Oakham, renting space there from Rutland County Council, who had recently bought the building and occupied the rest of it.
