= Uppingham Rural District =

Rutland, England

Coordinates: 52.59°N 0.72°W

Uppingham
- Uppingham Rural District shown within Rutland in 1970.
- Area
  - 1911: 24,735 acres (100.10 km^{2})
  - 1961: 24,735 acres (100.10 km^{2})
- Population
  - 1901: 6,809
  - 1971: 6,587
- History
  - Origin: Rural sanitary district
  - Created: 1894
  - Abolished: 1974
  - Succeeded by: Rutland
- Status: Rural district
- Government: Uppingham Rural District Council
  - HQ: Uppingham
- Subdivisions
  - Type: Civil parishes

Uppingham was a rural district in Rutland, England from 1894 to 1974, covering the south of the county.

The rural district was formed by the Local Government Act 1894 from the part of the Uppingham rural sanitary district in Rutland. At the same time, the remainder of Uppingham RSD, which lay in Leicestershire and Northamptonshire became Hallaton Rural District and Gretton Rural District respectively.

The only town in the district was Uppingham.

The rural district was abolished in 1974 by the Local Government Act 1972. Uppingham RD was merged with three other authorities to become the non-metropolitan district of Rutland.

== Parishes ==
The rural district consisted of twenty civil parishes:

- Ayston
- Barrowden
- Beaumont Chase
- Belton
- Bisbrooke
- Caldecott
- Glaston
- Lyddington
- North Luffenham
- Morcott
- Pilton
- Preston
- Ridlington
- Seaton
- South Luffenham
- Stoke Dry
- Thorpe by Water
- Uppingham
- Wardley
- Wing

== Premises ==
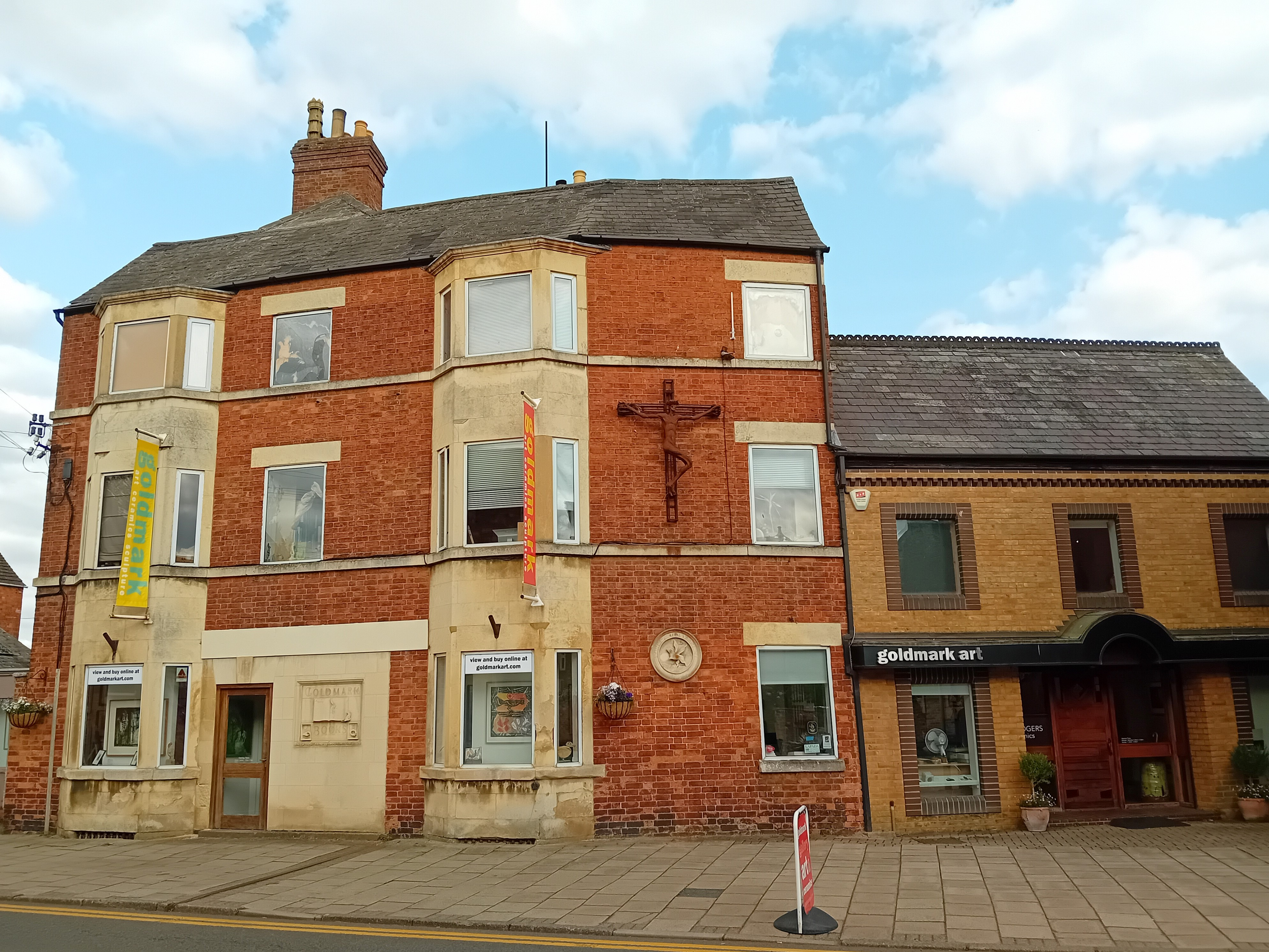
14 Orange Street, Uppingham: Council's offices and meeting place from mid-20th century until its abolition in 1974, since converted into a shop and art gallery

In its early years, the council met at the Uppingham Union Workhouse on Leicester Road. The council later established its own offices and meeting place at 14 Orange Street in Uppingham.
