= Seaton Meadows =

Coordinates: 52.571°N 0.651°W

- Site of Special Scientific Interest
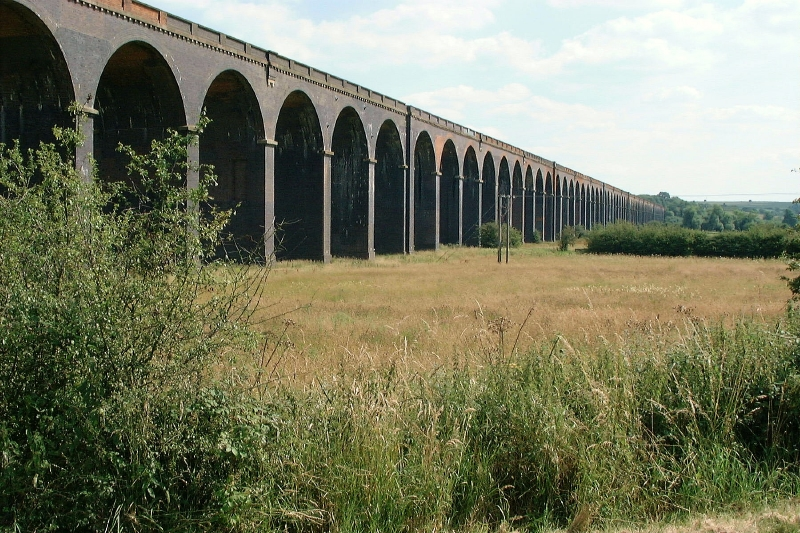
- Location of Seaton Meadows.
- Area of search: Rutland
- Grid reference: SP 915 979
- Interest: Biological
- Area: 11.4 hectares
- Notification date: 1991
- Location map: Magic Map

Seaton Meadows is an 11.4-hectare (28-acre) biological Site of Special Scientific Interest east of Seaton in Rutland. It is owned and managed by Plantlife.

This site is traditionally managed as hay pasture, and it is an example of unimproved alluvial flood meadows, a rare habitat due to agricultural developments. The grasses are diverse, including meadow foxtail, red fescue, sweet vernal grass and Yorkshire fog.

There is access from the B672 road.
