= Martinsthorpe =

Civil parish in Rutland, England

Coordinates: 52.633°N 0.721°W

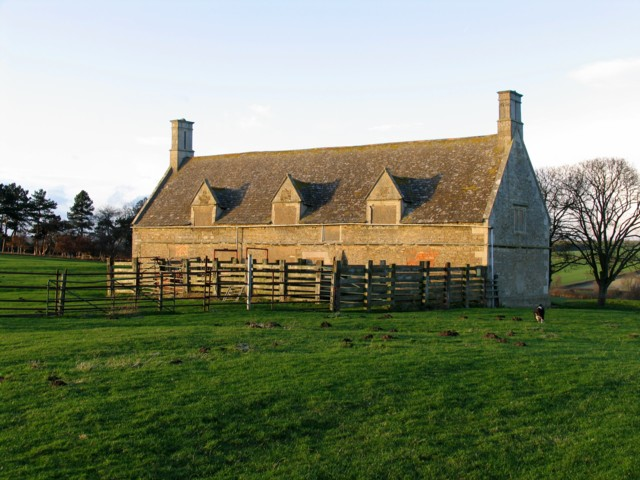
- The only building in Martinsthorpe (in 2007, before restoration)

- Location within Rutland
- Area: 0.84 sq mi (2.2 km^{2})
- Population: 0 2001 Census
  - Density: 0/sq mi (0/km^{2})
- OS grid reference: SK866047
  - London: 83 miles (134 km) SSE
- Unitary authority: Rutland
- Shire county: Rutland
- Ceremonial county: Rutland
- Region: East Midlands
- Country: England
- Sovereign state: United Kingdom
- Post town: OAKHAM
- Postcode district: LE15
- Dialling code: 01572
- Police: Leicestershire
- Fire: Leicestershire
- Ambulance: East Midlands
- UK Parliament: Rutland and Stamford

Martinsthorpe is a civil parish in the county of Rutland in the East Midlands of England.

The village's name means 'outlying farm/settlement of Martin'.

It is located about four miles (6 km) south of Oakham near the village of Manton. It is the site of a deserted medieval village. Martinsthorpe was the only parish in Rutland to have no population, (although according to the 2001 census, Beaumont Chase also recorded a population of zero). It was one of only eight parishes in England with nil population.

Now it has a population of one.

One building remains in the parish; Old Hall Farmhouse, a Grade II listed building, prominent on the ridge. Originally this was part of the service wing of Martinsthorpe Hall, a seat of the Earls of Nottingham, the Dowager Duchess of Devonshire, the de Monfort family, the de Capel-Brookes, the Earl of Denbigh and others. Built in ca 1660, the remaining building had many uses, as evidenced by the numerous large inglenook fireplaces and numerous historic alterations. The last occupants, until the late 1950's, was by the Goodyer family, tenant farmers. After several decades unoccupied, in 2011 a programme of total restoration and renovation began. Now re-occupied, it has been named Martinsthorpe House.

An ancient route, perhaps a true ridgeway of the Bronze Age, comes westwards from Stamford and follows the limestone ridge by Edith Weston, Manton and Martinsthorpe, entering Leicestershire near Withcote.

== Ward ==
Martinsthorpe was an electoral division for the purposes of electing councillors to Rutland County Council and comprised the parishes of Gunthorpe, Lyndon, Manton, Martinsthorpe, Morcott, Pilton, and Wing.

Since the 2019 election, it has been merged to form the Braunston and Martinsthorpe ward, which elects two members to the County Council.
