= St Nicholas' Church, Thistleton =

Church in Thistleton, Rutland

Coordinates: 52°45′06″N 0°38′54″W

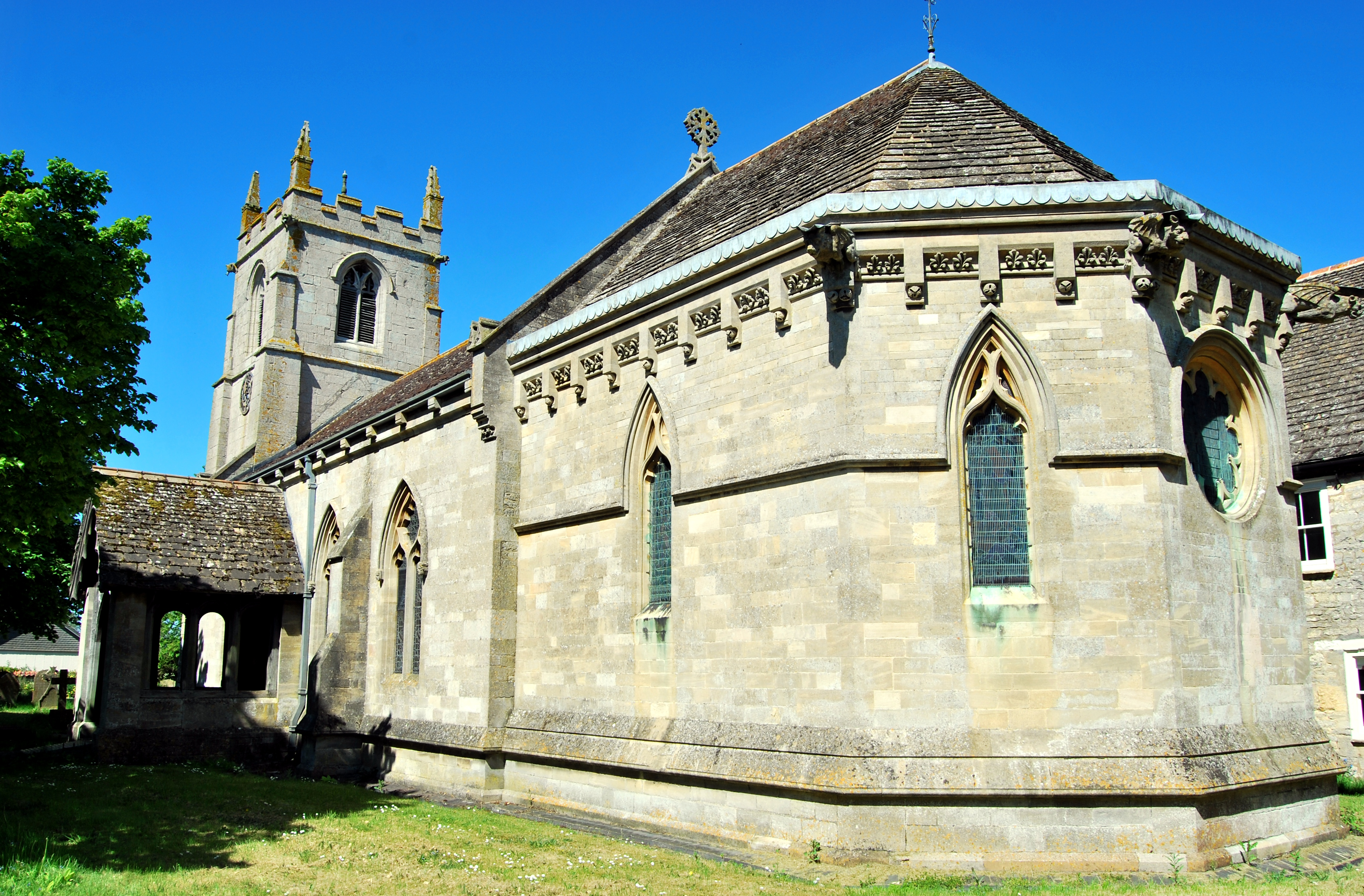
- Denomination: Church of England

History
- Dedication: St Nicholas

Administration
- Diocese: Peterborough
- Parish: Thistleton, Rutland

St Nicholas' Church in Thistleton, Rutland, England, is a former Church of England parish church, now a chapel of ease. It is a Grade II* listed building.

== History ==
Most of the church was built in 1879 replacing a church with medieval origins. Of the earlier building, only the 14th-century, three-stage tower, with gargoyles, remains. The nave had been rebuilt in the late 18th century by George Bridges Brudenell. The former rector, the Rev.d Sir John Henry Fludyer, 4th Baronet rebuilt the church in 1879 and the elaborate chancel is a memorial to his three eldest children who died of scarlet fever. The newer building is fourteenth century in style. The shape of the apse is polygonal externally and semi-circular inside. In the apse are terracotta statues of the four evangelists in gabled niches and a relief of the entombment of Christ over the altar by Mario Raggi. Most of the internal fittings, including the font and the organ, are relatively modern.

Thistleton and Cottesmore parishes were merged and on 1 April 2017, the church became a chapel of ease.
