= St Edmund's Church, Egleton =

Church in Egleton, Rutland

Coordinates: 52°39′31″N 0°42′23″W

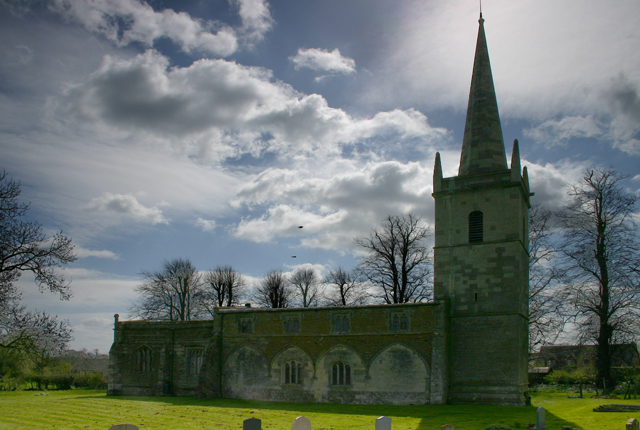
- Denomination: Church of England

History
- Dedication: St Edmund

Administration
- Diocese: Peterborough
- Parish: Egleton, Rutland

Clergy
- Vicar: Chris Rattenberry

St Edmund's Church is a church in Egleton, Rutland. It is a Grade I listed building.

== History ==
The church is essentially Norman with good examples of Norman carving in the chancel arch and the south door. Patterned columns support the doorway.

The church says the south doorway dates from the 12th century and Nikolaus Pevsner describes its style as Saxo-Norman. A carved tympanum, showing, what is thought to be, either a lion or a dragon facing each other from each side of a six-armed wheel, can be seen.

The 12th-century font features rosettes and crosses. The south-facing part has a geometric shape with six leaves similar to the one on the tympanum.

A rood screen dating from the 15th century can be seen at the western end of the nave. The medieval pews are decorated with poppyheads. Situated above the chancel arch is a coat of arms probably belonging to George III.

In the 14th century the tower, south porch, clerestory, arcade and north aisle were all added. The chancel had to be rebuilt in the 15th century. The north aisle has been demolished and the arcade in-filled.
