= All Hallows Church, Seaton =

Church in Seaton, Rutland

Coordinates: 52°34′29″N 0°40′02″W

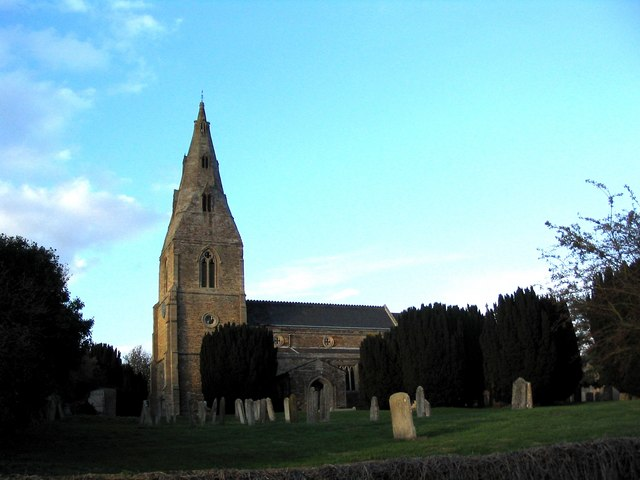
- Denomination: Church of England

History
- Dedication: All Hallows

Administration
- Diocese: Peterborough
- Parish: Seaton, Rutland

Clergy
- Rector: Jane Baxter

All Hallows Church is a church in Seaton, Rutland, England. It is a Grade II listed building.

== History ==
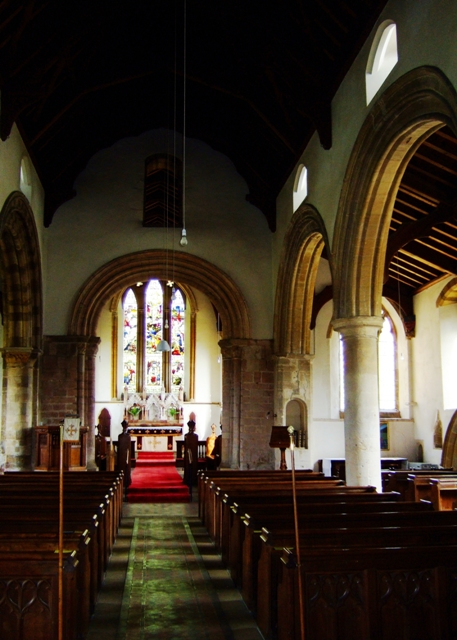
The nave

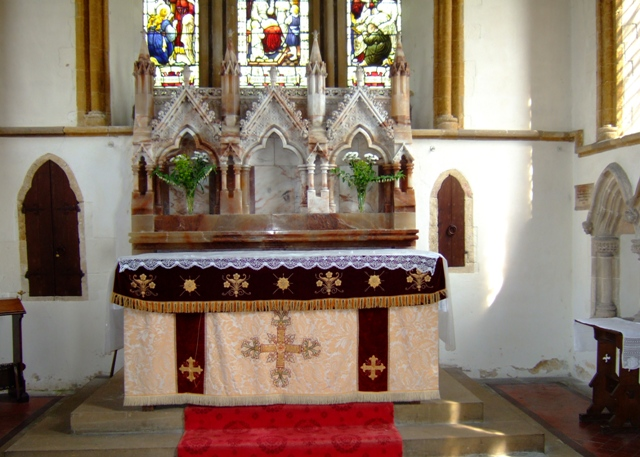
The chancel

At 122 ft (37 m) long, the church is one of the longest in Rutland. The church has north and south aisles, a late 13th-century tower and broach spire, chancel and nave. Norman features are found in the south doorway. The chancel arch dates from the same date and has carved abaci. It was rebuilt in the 13th century. The arcades were also rebuilt a century earlier.

Restoration took place in 1874–1875 with new roofs being built, renewed windows and the clerestory windows being added. The pulpit and font were Victorian additions.

The chancel contains a wall tablet to John Monckton (d. 1830) of Fineshade Abbey and family members. The stained glass of the east window by Heaton, Butler and Bayne was placed there by Edward Monckton (1840 – 1916) in memory of his wife, Christabel. The north aisle has a memorial to the seven men from Seaton who were killed in World War I.
