= All Saints' Church, Braunston-in-Rutland =

Church in Braunston-in-Rutland, Rutland

Coordinates: 52.6507°N 0.7708°W

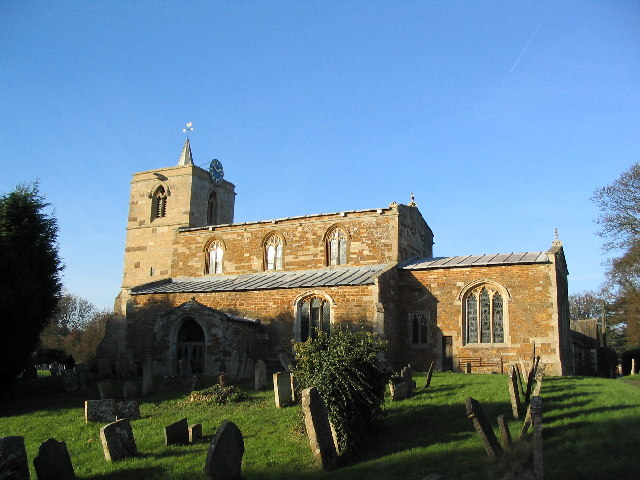
- Denomination: Church of England

History
- Dedication: All Saints'

Administration
- Diocese: Peterborough
- Parish: Braunston-in-Rutland, Rutland

Clergy
- Vicar(s): Chris Rattenberry

All Saints' Church is a Church of England parish church in Braunston-in-Rutland, Rutland. It is a Grade II* listed building.

== History ==
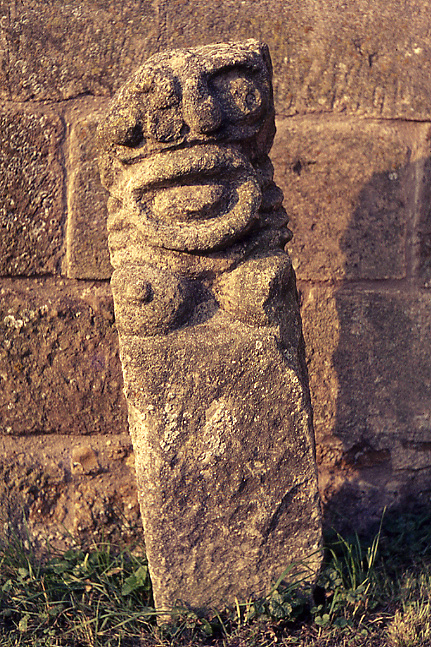
The Braunston "Goddess"

The church dates back to the late 12th century. The font, chancel arch and the southern doorway arch survive from this period. There is a section of an old, carved coffin situated in the south-western corner of the church. The southern aisle is home to two medieval wall paintings. The four stained glass windows, made by C. E. Kempe & Co., each has the Eamer mark of a wheatsheaf.

The most interesting part of the church is a carved stone situated around the side of the western tower. It is roughly 3 ft high and looks like a smiling figure. It was only uncovered when a step, which it was forming, was removed. The date of the carving is unknown but it is probably pre-Christian. It could possibly be a fertility cult or a form of the Celtic Earth Mother. This is locally referred to as The Braunston "Goddess".

Buried in the churchyard is Gladys Walter of the Women's Royal Air Force who died from pneumonia on Armistice Day, 11 November 1918.
