= St Andrew's Church, Stoke Dry =

Church in Stoke Dry, Rutland

- St Andrew's Church, Stoke Dry
- 52.562172°N 0.739459°W
- Location: Stoke Dry
- Country: England
- Denomination: Church of England

Administration
- Diocese: Peterborough
- Parish: Stoke Dry, Rutland

St Andrew's Church, Stoke Dry is a Grade I listed parish church in Stoke Dry, Rutland. Originating in the early 12th century, it was largely rebuilt during the 13th and early 14th centuries, with further additions in the 15th century and restoration in 1898.

The church retains carved Norman shafts at the chancel arch, medieval wall paintings and a 15th-century screen with its rood canopy. It contains monuments to members of the Digby family. Sir Everard Digby, one of the Gunpowder Plot conspirators, also belonged to the family associated with Stoke Dry.

== History ==
St Andrew’s church dates from the early 12th century. It was substantially rebuilt during the 13th and early 14th centuries. The clerestory and north porch were added in the 15th century. Later work includes the chapel roof of 1574, the tower’s bell chamber of 1694 and restoration in 1898. The south porch was rebuilt in the 20th century.

Stoke Dry's manor was held by the Digby family in the early 17th century. Sir Everard Digby was one of the Gunpowder Plot conspirators and was executed for his involvement.

The church suffered heritage crime in 2018, and repairs were undertaken in early 2022.

== Architecture ==
=== Structure and fabric ===
The church consists of a narrow west tower, an aisled nave, north and south porches, a south chapel and a chancel. Its walls are built of coursed ironstone rubble, with Collyweston slate roofs over the chancel and chapel and lead roofs elsewhere. Its architecture combines Romanesque carving with Early English, Decorated and Perpendicular work.

The late 15th-century north porch has an arched entrance and an upper room with an oriel window. The chapel and chancel have three-light east windows with different patterns of Decorated tracery. The nave clerestory has three bays of flat-headed, cusped two-light windows. The tower’s bell chamber has traceried openings, a band of four-lobed decoration and battlements.

=== Interior ===
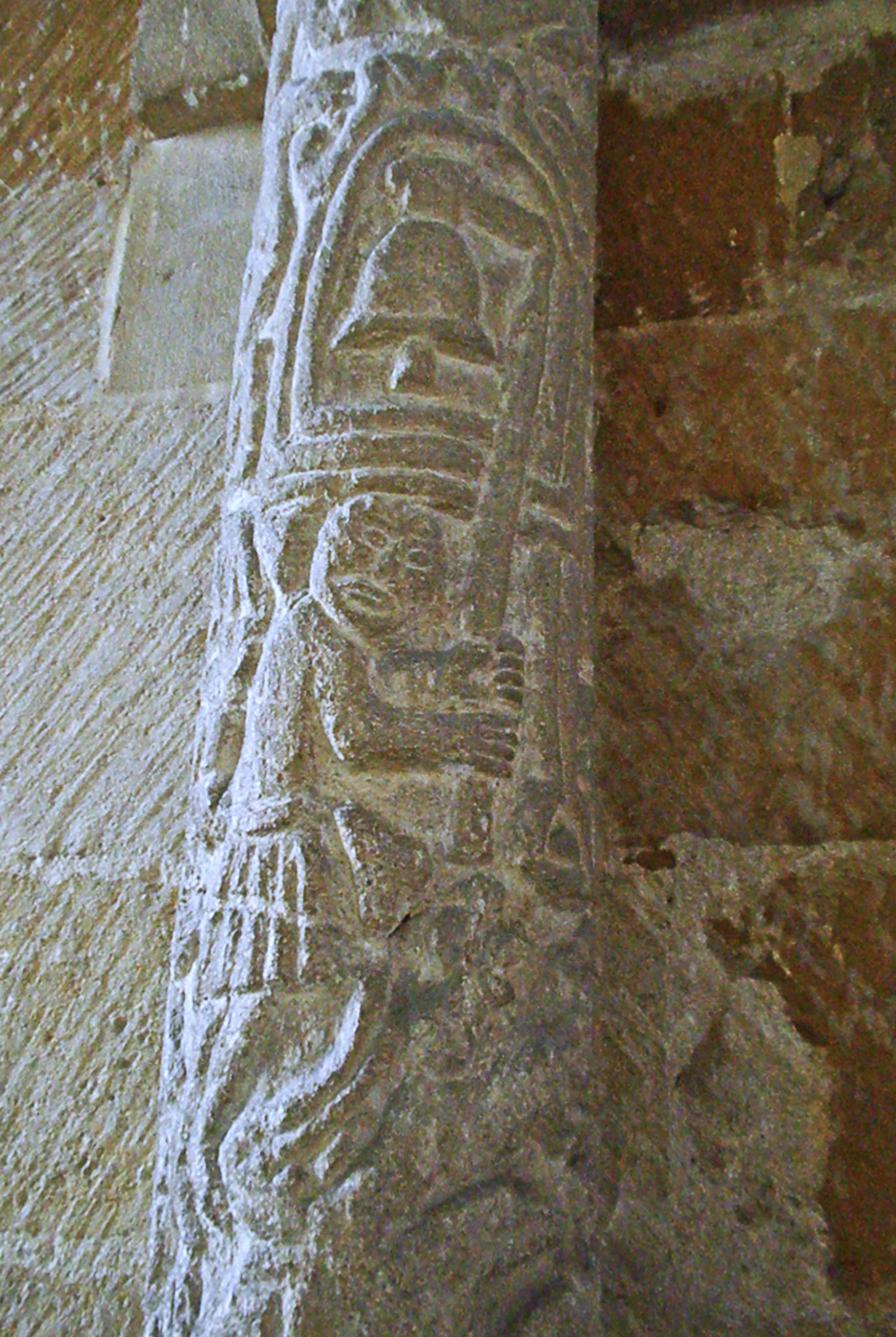
Carving of a bell-ringer on a chancel-arch shaft

The chancel arch incorporates early 12th-century shafts carved with figures, animals and foliage. One shaft includes a figure of a man pulling on a bellrope with the devil hiding below. Norman stonework also survives in the north wall of the chancel. The nave is of three bays with Reformation text visible in the clerestory above.

The south wall of the Digby Chapel has late 13th-century wall paintings depicting the martyrdom of St Edmund and St Christopher carrying Christ. Other surviving features include a chancel aumbry, a blocked arch and an ogee window opening towards the chapel.

=== Furnishings and monuments ===
The church retains a 15th-century screen with its rood canopy. Other survivals include 16th-century bench ends with poppyheads, fragments of old glass in the east window, a disused stone font and a wooden coffin trestle inscribed “Iob Swayen fecit 1694”. The pulpit and current font are 19th-century, and stained glass dates from 1904.

The church contains several monuments to the Digby family. In the chancel, an alabaster tomb chest bears recumbent effigies of Kenelm Digby (d. 1590) and his wife Anne, with figures of mourners and corner balusters. A monument to an earlier Everard Digby, dated about 1540, stands in the south chapel. It has a damaged effigy of a knight on a tomb chest decorated with blind tracery, shields and balusters, with an ornamental arched recess behind it. In the south aisle, a slab dated 1496 bears an incised figure of Jacqueta Digby, damaged by graffiti.

== Gallery ==
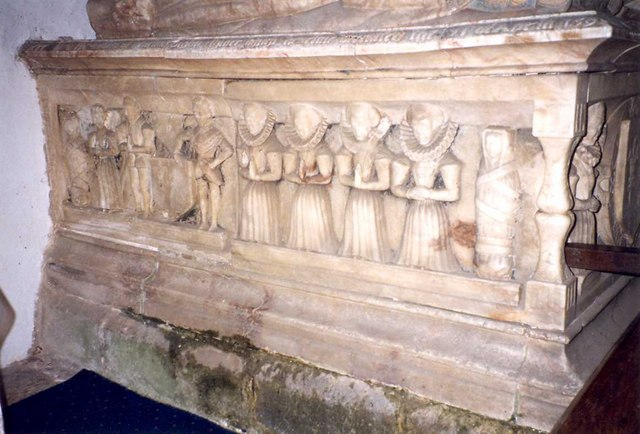
Table tomb to Kenelm Digby

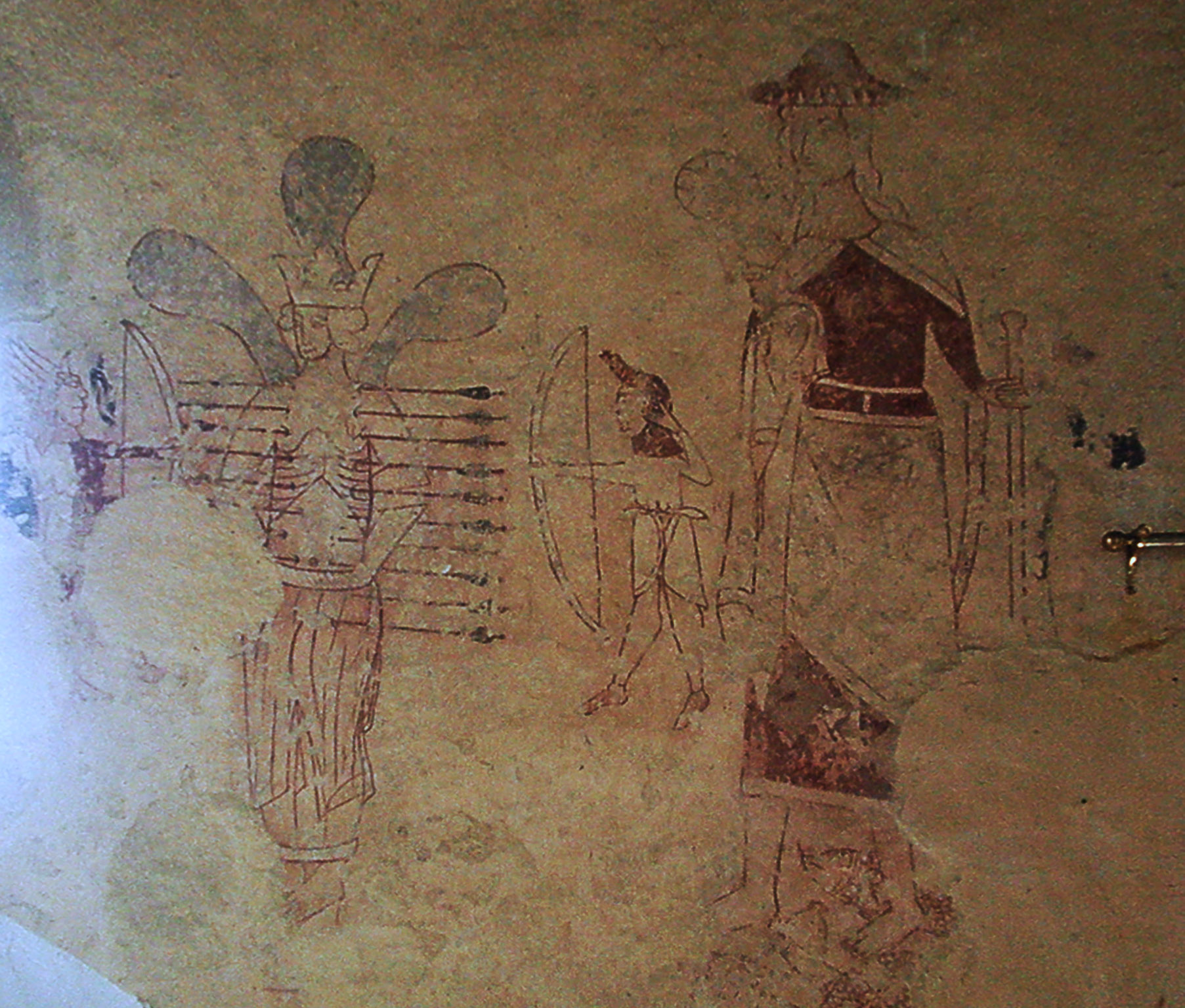
Martyrdom of King Edmund

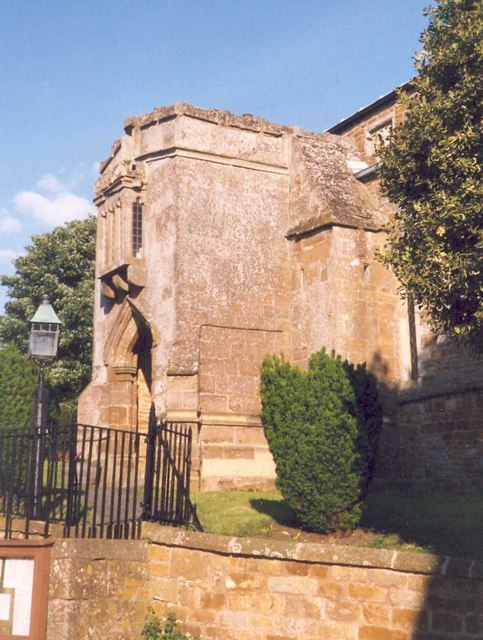
Porch with parvis

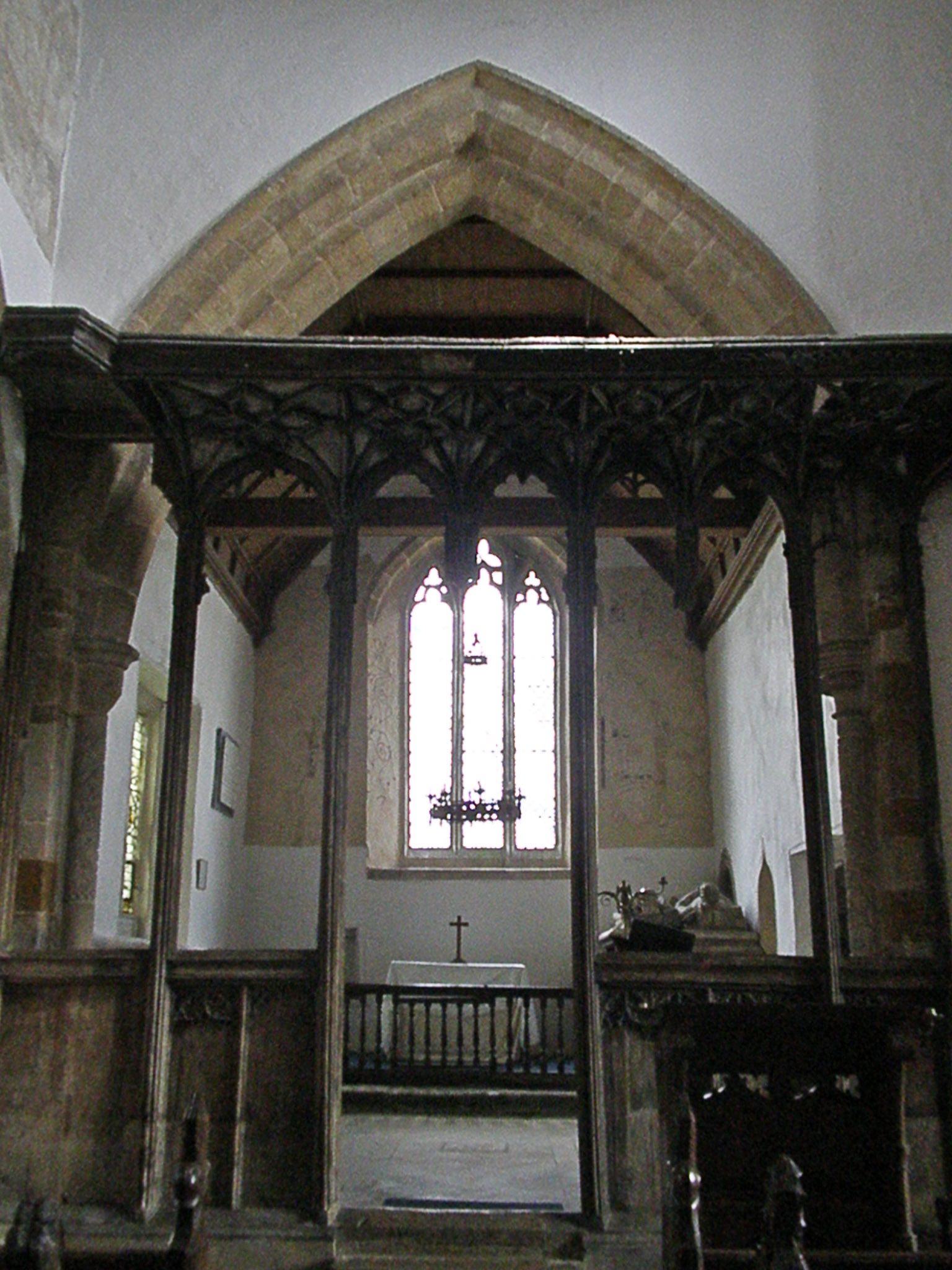
Rood screen
