= Market Overton =

Village in Rutland, England

Coordinates: 52.738°N 0.687°W

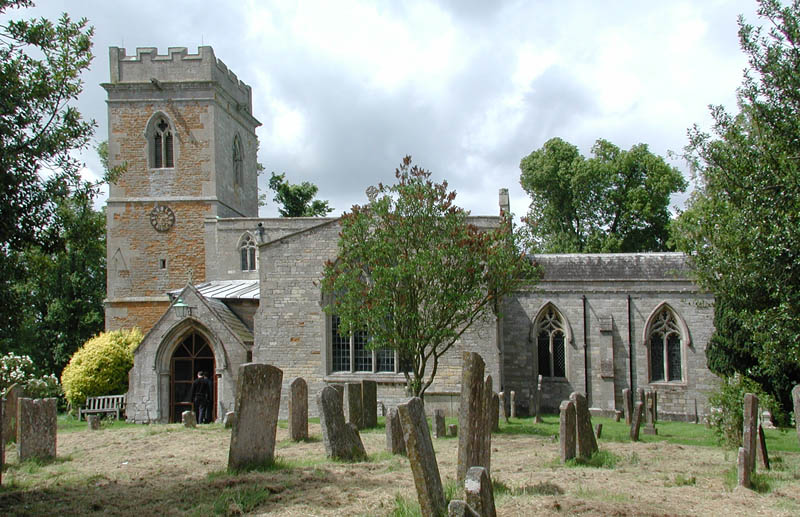
- Church of St Peter and St Paul, Market Overton

- Location within Rutland
- Area: 2.82 sq mi (7.3 km^{2})
- Population: 494 2001 Census
  - Density: 175/sq mi (68/km^{2})
- OS grid reference: SK887164
  - London: 88 miles (142 km) SSE
- Civil parish: Market Overton
- Unitary authority: Rutland
- Shire county: Rutland
- Ceremonial county: Rutland
- Region: East Midlands
- Country: England
- Sovereign state: United Kingdom
- Post town: OAKHAM
- Postcode district: LE15
- Dialling code: 01572
- Police: Leicestershire
- Fire: Leicestershire
- Ambulance: East Midlands
- UK Parliament: Rutland and Stamford

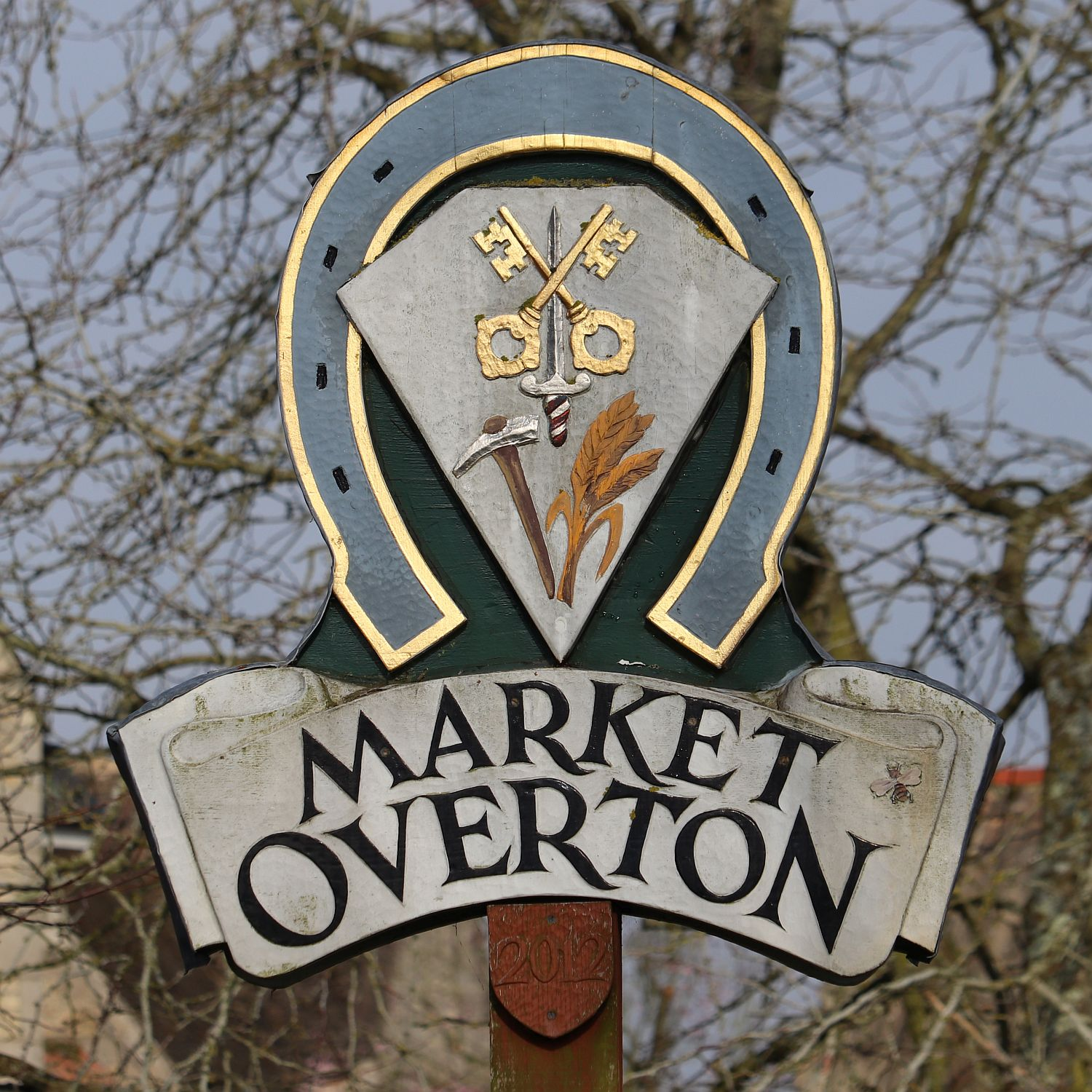
Market Overton Village Sign

Market Overton is a village on the northern edge of the county of Rutland in the East Midlands of England. The population of the civil parish (including Teigh) was 494 at the 2001 census, increasing to 584 at the 2011 census.

== History ==
The village's name means 'Higher farm/settlement' or 'farm/settlement on/by a ridge'. 'Market' is recorded from 1200 and was added to show the village's early function as a market town.

The parish church is dedicated to St Peter and St Paul. A Grade I listed building, it contains a Saxon arch and some carved stone from the Anglo-Saxon era, but most of the existing fabric is in the Perpendicular style, dating from the late 13th and early 14th century. The church, in the Diocese of Peterborough, is part of the Oakham team ministry.

Hannah Ayscough, mother of Isaac Newton, was born in the village in 1623. The regicide Thomas Waite has been claimed to be the son of a village pub landlord. William Kitchen Parker, the zoologist, worked as a druggist's assistant to the village's doctor.

The Market Store is a community shop, opened in May 2010.

There is a stocks with whipping post on the village green which was probably the location of the medieval market place.

=== Ironstone ===
There is a small industrial estate to the north of the village, where ironstone was mined from 1906-72 by James Pain Ltd, later becoming Stewarts & Lloyds then BSC Tubes Division. The brick terraced houses on the road to Thistleton were built for the workers. Access to the mine was by railway, which joined the Melton-Bourne railway at Pain's Sidings. More information is found at the Rutland Railway Museum.

=== Markon Engineering ===
The Markon Engineering company (derived from Stamford Engineering), was started in the village in 1959 by Messrs Fawkes and Knight, and moved to Oakham in 1960 then Dalcross near Inverness in 1969. They made electrical generators and were taken over by Newage Ltd in 1987. Generators of the Markon name are now made by Cummins Generator Technologies, based in Stamford. They now make two-pole single-phase capacitor-type alternators under the Markon name.

== Geography ==
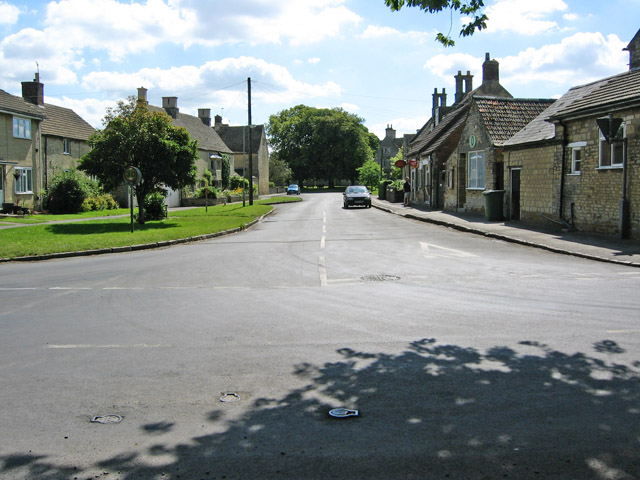
High Street with community shop

The village is on the eastern side of an escarpment overlooking the Vale of Catmose. The area's subsoil is Upper Lias and Inferior Oolite.

Most of the civil parish lies to the north and the east, including part of RAF Cottesmore (now Kendrew Barracks), but not the main runway. The boundary crosses Teigh Road at Netherfields where it borders Teigh. South of Hall Farm, it borders Wymondham and Leicestershire. The Oakham Canal passes through the west of the parish. The county boundary (and the Rutland Round) passes on the southern edge of Woodwell Head. It passes to the south of Pasture Farm and the southern edge of Cribb's Lodge (in Wymondham), where the parish boundary meets Thistleton. The former quarry extended into Thistleton at this point. The Rutland Round detours from the county boundary here through Leicestershire to meet the main road.

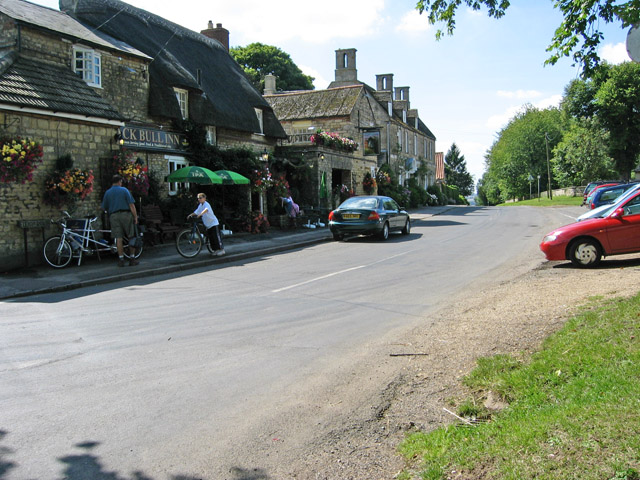
The Black Bull pub in August 2005

Virtually all of the road to Thistleton is in the parish. It passes near to Thistleton just west of Top Farm (and Sewstern Lane). The former quarry extended to just north of the airfield. It briefly borders Greetham inside RAF Cottesmore, then borders Barrow. The village does not border Cottesmore and is around 475 feet (145 m) above sea level.
