= Stoke Dry =

Village in Rutland, England

Coordinates: 52.562°N 0.738°W

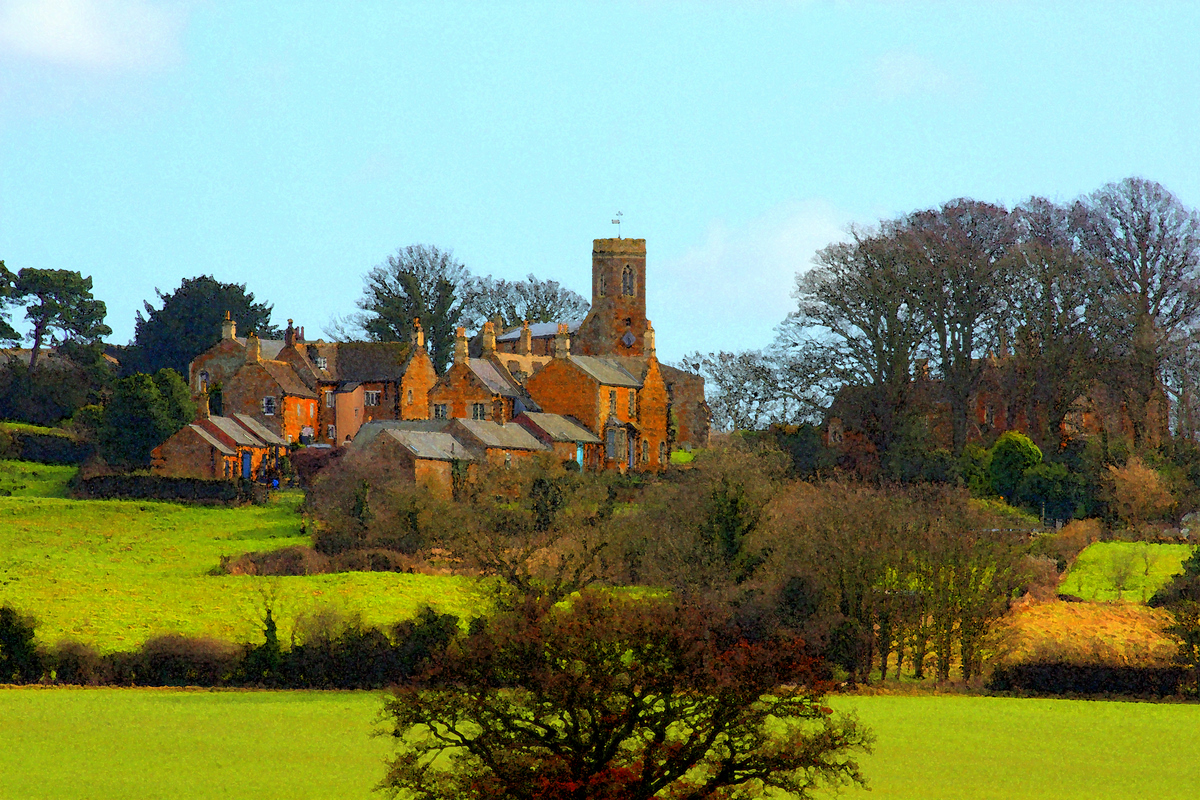
- in 2009

- Location within Rutland
- Area: 1.55 sq mi (4.0 km^{2})
- Population: 35 2001 Census
  - Density: 23/sq mi (8.9/km^{2})
- OS grid reference: SP893984
  - London: 78 miles (126 km) SSE
- Unitary authority: Rutland
- Shire county: Rutland
- Ceremonial county: Rutland
- Region: East Midlands
- Country: England
- Sovereign state: United Kingdom
- Post town: OAKHAM
- Postcode district: LE15
- Dialling code: 01572
- Police: Leicestershire
- Fire: Leicestershire
- Ambulance: East Midlands
- UK Parliament: Rutland and Stamford

Stoke Dry is a village and civil parish in the county of Rutland in the East Midlands of England, about three miles (5 km) southwest of Uppingham.

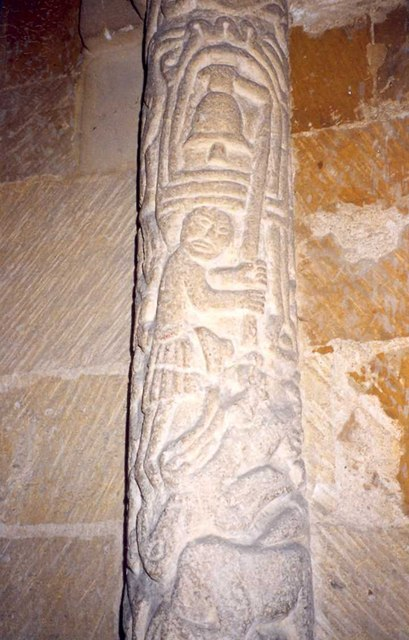
Carving of a bellringer on shaft to chancel arch, St Andrew's Church, Stoke Dry

The village's name means 'outlying farm/settlement'. The village is positioned on a hill above a valley that may have been marshy in previous times and may have been drained.

In 2007 it had a population of 39. At the 2011 census the population remained less than 100 and was included with the parish of Seaton. With only 14 homes this is a quiet village. St Andrew's Church, Stoke Dry has mediaeval wall paintings and Romanesque chancel arch. A myth claims that the Gunpowder Plot conspirators met in a small room above the porch; the only basis for this is that the manor was part of the estate of Sir Everard Digby.

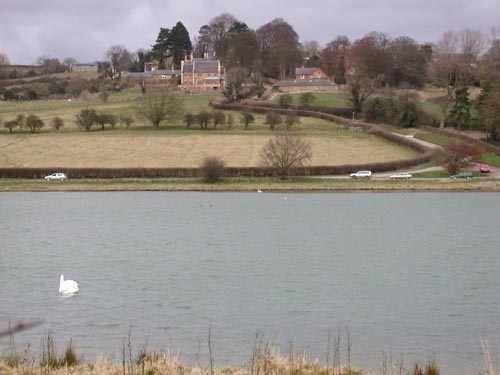
The village, looking northeast from Eyebrook Reservoir

Stoke Dry is known as the site of the Eyebrook Reservoir located at the bottom of the hill. The reservoir was used by Avro Lancasters flying from RAF Scampton as the final practice run for Guy Gibson's No. 617 Squadron RAF prior to Operation Chastise, the Dambusters attack on the Ruhr valley dams on the night of the 16/17 May 1943.

In 2009 the village was one of three (along with Lyddington and Thorpe by Water) to become the first in the UK to benefit from superfast broadband using sub-loop unbundling
