= Morcott =

Village in Rutland, England

Coordinates: 52.597°N 0.638°W

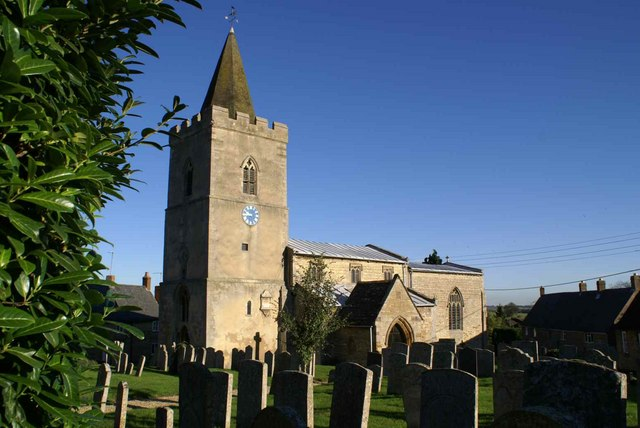
- St Mary's Church, Morcott

- Location within Rutland
- Area: 2.13 sq mi (5.5 km^{2})
- Population: 329 2001 Census
  - Density: 154/sq mi (59/km^{2})
- OS grid reference: SK923007
  - London: 79 miles (127 km) SSE
- Unitary authority: Rutland
- Shire county: Rutland
- Ceremonial county: Rutland
- Region: East Midlands
- Country: England
- Sovereign state: United Kingdom
- Post town: OAKHAM
- Postcode district: LE15
- Dialling code: 01572
- Police: Leicestershire
- Fire: Leicestershire
- Ambulance: East Midlands
- UK Parliament: Rutland and Stamford

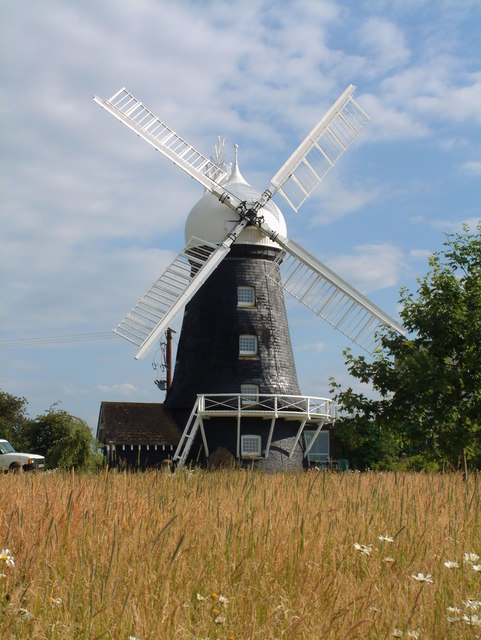
Morcott Mill

Morcott is a village and civil parish in the county of Rutland in the East Midlands of England. The population at the 2001 census was 329 falling slightly to 321 at the 2011 census. It is located about 7 miles (11 km) south-east of the county town of Oakham on the A47 and A6121 roads. A prominent reconstructed windmill can be seen from both East and West-bound approaches to Morcott along the A47.

Rutland County Council designated Morcott a Conservation Area in 1981, one of 34 conservation areas in Rutland which are "of special architectural or historic interest, the character or appearance of which it is desirable to preserve or enhance".

== Location and setting ==
Rutland County Council documents describe Morcott as a moderately sized, compact and attractive Rutland village four miles to the east of the nearest town, Uppingham located in undulating, open countryside, approximately 75 metres above sea level on the north facing slope of a tributary of the River Chater.

=== Historical development ===
The village name is an Old English derivation of "a cottage on the moor". The village is recorded as Morcote in the Domesday survey of 1086 and formed part of the king's manor of Barrowden. The village served the manorial interests of several different ownerships but passed to the Fydell Rowley family in the early 19th century. The Church of St Mary is the defining landmark in the village and is regarded as the most complete Norman church in Rutland.

The historic origins of the village are associated with agriculture and have resulted in a legacy of good, stone built farmhouses, cottages and outbuildings. Although none of the surviving houses are believed to date from earlier than the 17th century, the style of many of the buildings and the dated examples indicate that Morcott shared in a period of transformation in the 17th and 18th centuries that reflected wider economic prosperity, based on growing demand and improvements in agriculture, notably in crop rotation and the wealth generated by sheep farming, that occurred in large parts of rural middle England at that time.

The historic importance of a number of the buildings within the village is reflected in there being 30 entries on the National Heritage List for England. Outside of the village, but within the parish, the windmill on Barrowden Road is a prominent landmark in views from the conservation area and surrounding countryside.

The defunct Morcott railway station on the branch line between Seaton and Luffenham closed in 1966. The road bridge which carries the High Street over the old railway cutting is a skew arch containing construction features rarely seen.

=== Buildings of local importance ===
St Mary the Virgin, the parish church, is a Grade I listed building. The Norman church features a 'pancake' window on the west side, and a north arcade considered to be 'the best example of Norman work in the area'.

In 2014 Rutland County Council cited additional buildings to those statutorily listed, 'as contributing to the character of the village' in the Morcott Conservation Area Character Appraisal and Management Proposal. These additions included a row of estate workers' houses on Fydell Row, a prominent pair of 19th-century farmhouses on the High Street, and the Village Hall - formerly a Baptist chapel rebuilt in 1903 in the Arts and Crafts style.

Morcott Hall was an independent girls' school for 25 years but is now again a private house.

== Businesses ==
Until the early 2000s a Post Office and small shop was open in the village. Once this closed the village was mainly served by the two petrol stations locally, the social enterprise the Barrowden & Wakerley Community Shop, and local towns Uppingham, Oakham, and Stamford. The nearest cities are Peterborough to the east, and Leicester to the west, both accessible by train from Oakham.

The White Horse Inn (currently (2022) closed) on Stamford Road is an historic coaching inn at the junction of Stamford Road and High Street and forms an attractive entrance to the east end of the village. It housed a plaque to 1982 Grand National winner Grittar, whose owner Frank Gilman lived in the parish. In the 21st century, changes in licence owners has seen it closed by Punch Taverns for long periods. A planning application for conversion of the former public house to residential use and the erection of four new dwellings was submitted in 2022.
