= Beaumont Chase =

Civil parish in Rutland, England

Coordinates: 52.59°N 0.76°W

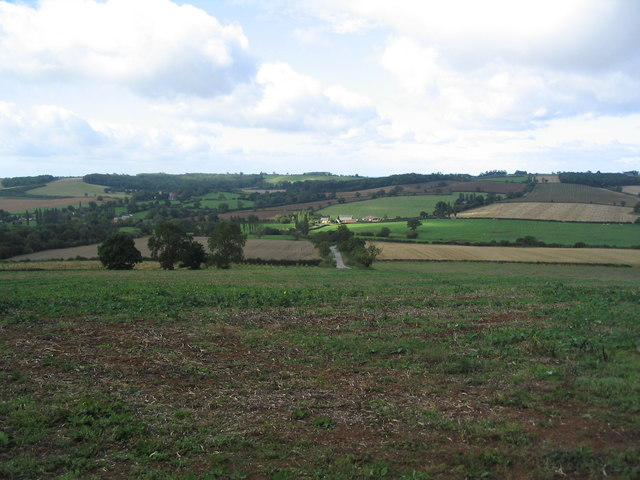
- View from Beaumont Chase towards Stockerston and the Eye Brook valley

- Location within Rutland
- Area: 0.72 sq mi (1.9 km^{2})
- Population: 0 2001 Census
  - Density: 0/sq mi (0/km^{2})
- OS grid reference: SP842986
  - London: 79 miles (127 km) SSE
- Unitary authority: Rutland
- Shire county: Rutland
- Ceremonial county: Rutland
- Region: East Midlands
- Country: England
- Sovereign state: United Kingdom
- Post town: OAKHAM
- Postcode district: LE15
- Dialling code: 01572
- Police: Leicestershire
- Fire: Leicestershire
- Ambulance: East Midlands
- UK Parliament: Rutland and Stamford

Beaumont Chase is a civil parish in the county of Rutland in the East Midlands of England. It is to the west of Uppingham, north of Stoke Dry, and on a hillside overlooking Leicestershire. Formerly an extra-parochial area, it was created a separate parish in 1858.

The civil parish's name means 'Beautiful hill'. 'Chase' is a later addition which means a place for breeding and hunting wild animals.

There is only a single occupied building, a farmhouse. According to the 2001 census, Beaumont Chase had a population of zero.
