= Gunthorpe, Rutland =

Hamlet in Rutland, England

Coordinates: 52.642°N 0.716°W

Gunthorpe
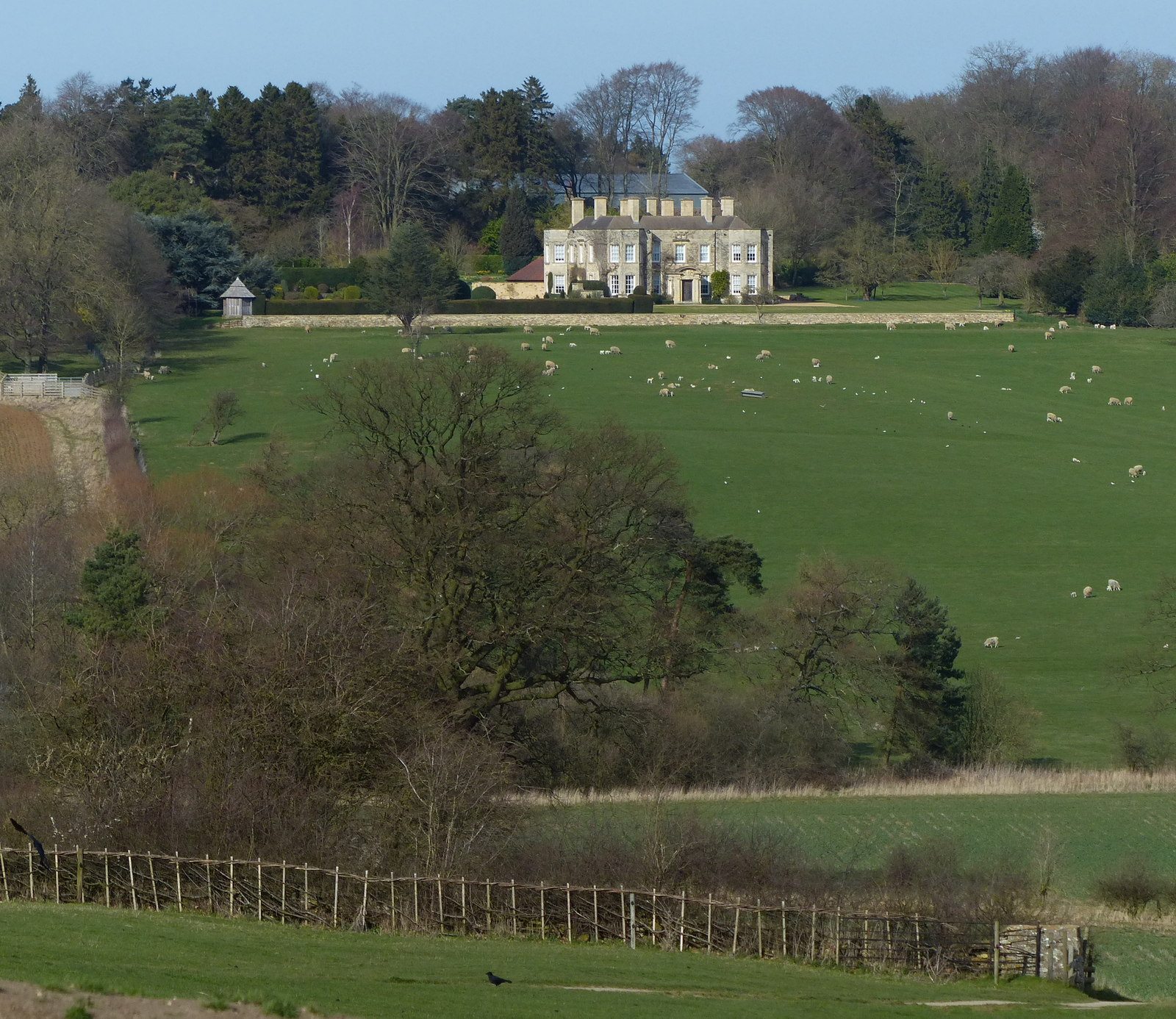
- Gunthorpe Hall

- Location within Rutland
- Area: 0.74 sq mi (1.9 km^{2})
- Population: 19 2001 Census
  - Density: 26/sq mi (10/km^{2})
- OS grid reference: SK869056
  - London: 83 miles (134 km) SSE
- Unitary authority: Rutland
- Shire county: Rutland
- Ceremonial county: Rutland
- Region: East Midlands
- Country: England
- Sovereign state: United Kingdom
- Post town: OAKHAM
- Postcode district: LE15
- Dialling code: 01562
- Police: Leicestershire
- Fire: Leicestershire
- Ambulance: East Midlands
- UK Parliament: Rutland and Stamford

Gunthorpe is a civil parish and a hamlet in the county of Rutland in the East Midlands of England.

The village's name means 'outlying farm/settlement of Gunni'.

Archeological digs have found evidence of Roman activity have found, including remains of a cart shed and wide ditches.

The population of Gunthorpe grew to several hundred before being devastated by the plague which ravaged Great Britain and much of Europe from 1347 to 1351. Today, Gunthorpe remains as one of Rutland's smallest inhabited hamlets, with just 14 houses, 5 businesses and 3 farms. Despite being dissected by the railway and the main Oakham to Uppingham A6003 road, the tiny hamlet of Gunthorpe remains a lively idyll, which typifies the agricultural heart of the county of Rutland. Set in the rolling hills adjoining the River Gwash, approximately 2 1/2 miles south of Oakham and on the western shores of Rutland Water, Gunthorpe has several footpaths and bridleways which offer some of the county's most enjoyable, all-year round views. The population of the civil parish remained less than 100 at the 2011 census and was included in the civil parish of Manton.

The estate was sold by the Earl of Ancaster to Charles Harvey Dixon in 1906, who with his wife, nee Robinson, whose family business was a famous department store on Oxford Circus in London, set about building a country retreat associated with fox hunting.There then began a substantial redevelopment and expansion. Gunthorpe Hall replaced a traditional red-brick farm house. It was built along with the stable block for horses. Gatehouses were built to the east of the railway line. All these buildings were completed over a five year period before WW1, and remain today. From 1939, the new owner, J B A Kessler and his family lived and worked from the Hall. Like his father, Kessler was instrumental in the management of Royal Dutch Shell, the oil company. Amongst other achievements, Kessler helped source crucial fuel supplies for Britain and its allies throughout WW2. The Hall was hit by bullets from passing German aircraft, who also dropped bombs in nearby fields which destroyed windows. After WW2, the Hall was then occupied by the eldest daughter, Anne and her husband Col Thomas Haywood, for over sixty years. Col Haywood modernised the farm and undertook many local civic roles, including as Lord Lieutenant of Rutland for 27 years. Three further dwellings for agricultural workers were added.

The stable block was converted into dwellings in 2015, and an abandoned shed (the last of the complex left after the Hall's construction) was restored into a new dwelling. In 2017, planning permission for new house was received as an enabling project to partly cover the conservation gap created by the restoration of Martinsthorpe House in the neighbouring parish. 5 businesses have begun at Gunthorpe, diversifying away from traditional purely agricultural activities.

Gunthorpe's oldest surviving building was built c. 1840. Now a farmhouse, the Durham Ox Inn was a popular haunt of the navvies and labourers engaged in the construction of part of the railway which became known as the London Midland and Scottish Railway, running between Kettering and Oakham from the mid 19th Century and to this day.
