= Egleton =

Village in Rutland, England

Coordinates: 52.658°N 0.706°W

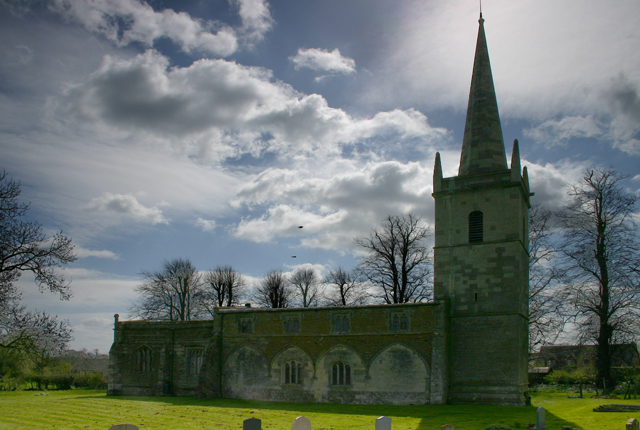
- St Edmund's Church, Egleton

- Location within Rutland
- Area: 1.44 sq mi (3.7 km^{2})
- Population: 79 2001 Census
  - Density: 55/sq mi (21/km^{2})
- OS grid reference: SK876074
  - London: 84 miles (135 km) SSE
- Unitary authority: Rutland
- Shire county: Rutland
- Ceremonial county: Rutland
- Region: East Midlands
- Country: England
- Sovereign state: United Kingdom
- Post town: OAKHAM
- Postcode district: LE15
- Dialling code: 01572
- Police: Leicestershire
- Fire: Leicestershire
- Ambulance: East Midlands
- UK Parliament: Rutland and Stamford

Egleton is a small village and civil parish in the county of Rutland in the East Midlands of England. It is situated south east of Oakham, and is close to the western shore of Rutland Water. The population of the village remained less than 100 at the 2011 census and was included with the parish of Burley.

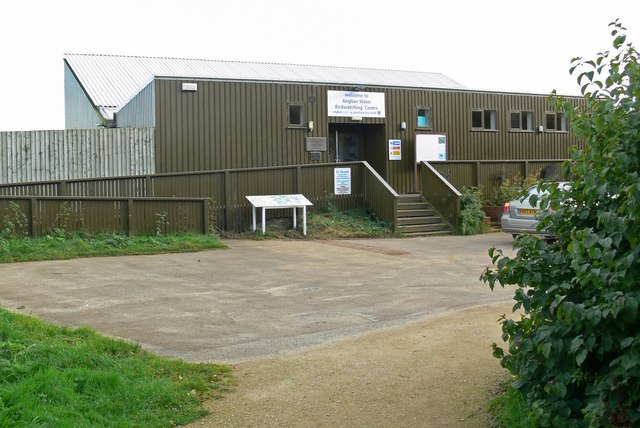
Anglian Water Birdwatching Centre

St Edmund's Church, the Church of England parish church, is a Grade I listed building. It has a notable Norman tympanum.

The village's name means 'farm/settlement of Ecgwulf'.
