= Thistleton =

Village in Rutland, England

Coordinates: 52.752°N 0.648°W

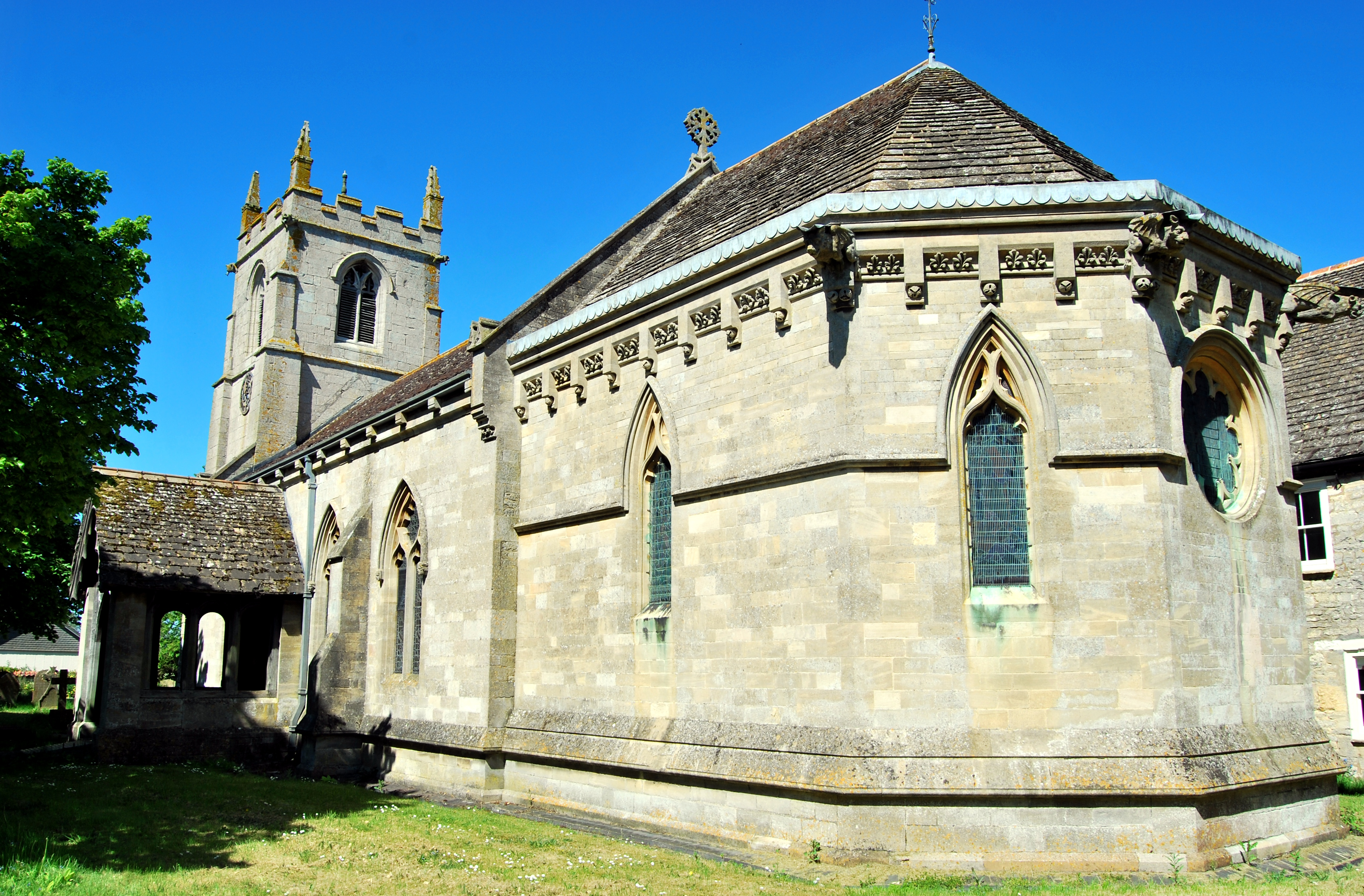
- St Nicholas' Church, Thistleton

- Location within Rutland
- Area: 2.15 sq mi (5.6 km^{2})
- Population: 99 2001 Census
  - Density: 46/sq mi (18/km^{2})
- OS grid reference: SK913180
  - London: 89 miles (143 km) SSE
- Unitary authority: Rutland
- Shire county: Rutland
- Ceremonial county: Rutland
- Region: East Midlands
- Country: England
- Sovereign state: United Kingdom
- Post town: OAKHAM
- Postcode district: LE15
- Dialling code: 01572
- Police: Leicestershire
- Fire: Leicestershire
- Ambulance: East Midlands
- UK Parliament: Rutland and Stamford

Thistleton is the most northerly village in the county of Rutland, and a civil parish, in the East Midlands of England. The population of the village at the 2001 census was 99. It remained less than 100 at the 2011 census and was counted together with the civil parish of Stretton.

The village's name means 'farm/settlement which is thistly'.

The Thistleton area has shown evidence of Romano-British occupation including a large temple precinct and a possible small market settlement. To the north of the village there has been extensive mining for ironstone, a stone that has featured very prominently in the building of many churches and other buildings in the area for centuries. It was thought that the mining had obliterated evidence of the former greater extent of the village but much archaeology has survived showing that the original Romano-British settlement extended some 100 acres (0.40 km^{2}) at least. Extensive surveys, brought about by the planning of a haulage road to the quarry to pass through the site of the ancient township, revealed features including a well-preserved Roman road and the skeleton of a child buried well away from the cemetery. The archaeology is ongoing as the mining continues.

The village contains several listed buildings including the Old Rectory and the Church of St Nicholas. Many of the village's buildings are stone-walled and thatched. Although the church is of medieval origin, only the 14th-century three-stage tower, complete with gargoyles, remains. The church was rebuilt in the late 18th century by the Brudenells, and the rector, the Rev.d Sir John Henry Fludyer, 4th Baronet to whose family the elaborate chancel is a memorial. The newer building is 14th century in style; however, the shape of the apse is half an octagon externally but semi-circular inside. Most of the internal fittings, including the font and the organ, are relatively modern.

Close by, to the south of the village, lies the RAF Cottesmore airfield which opened in 1938. The airfield is now the Army's Kendrew Barracks.

== Boxing match ==
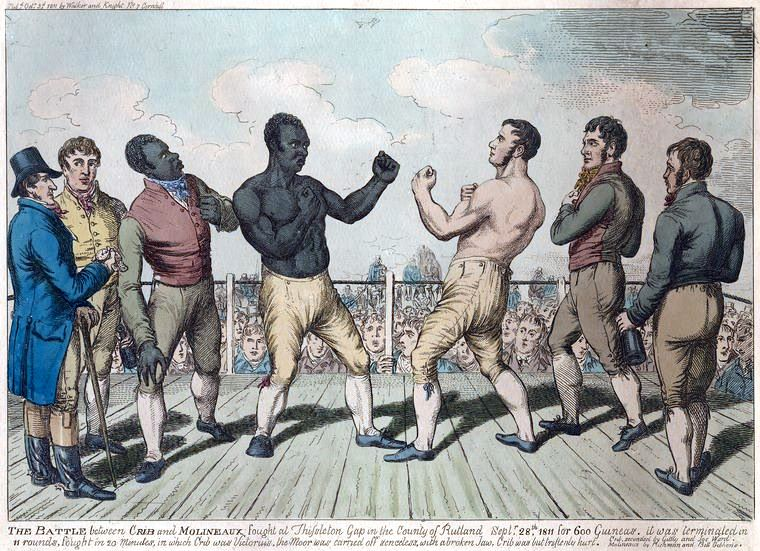
Molineaux vs Cribb, 1811

On 28 September 1811 a massive crowd of up to 20,000 watched a prizefight at Thistleton Gap. Tom Cribb fought the American Tom Molineaux in a hotly contested re-match for the heavyweight championship of England. The match was a matter of national pride and the names of both these men were famous throughout the land. The venue was chosen as the three counties of Rutland, Leicestershire and Lincolnshire met there in a tripoint and, if the authorities arrived to halt the illegal fight, the boxers and crowd could escape across the county boundary. In the eleventh round Cribb knocked out Molineaux. The original match, a year before, had ended in exhaustion for both men after a gruelling 33 rounds with accusations of cheating. During the intervening period both men had lost weight; Cribb because of extensive training with the famous Captain Barclay and Molineaux due to loss of muscle whilst earning his keep at local prizefighting venues.
