= Barrow, Rutland =

Village and civil parish in Rutland, England

Coordinates: 52.73°N 0.68°W

Barrow
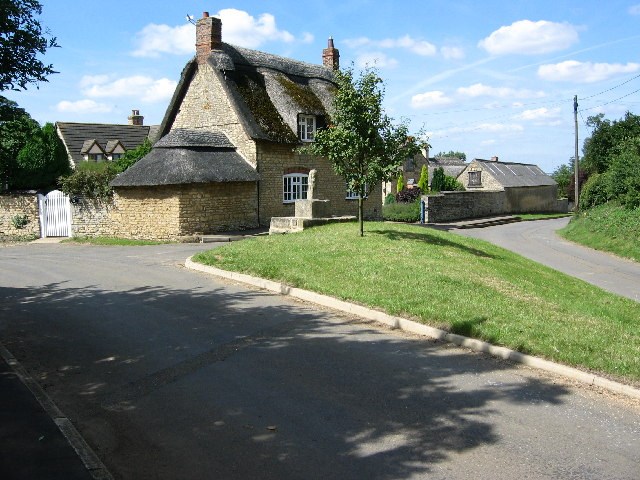

- Location within Rutland
- Area: 1.6 sq mi (4.1 km^{2})
- Population: 67 2001 Census
  - Density: 42/sq mi (16/km^{2})
- OS grid reference: SK889152
  - London: 88 miles (142 km) SSE
- Unitary authority: Rutland
- Shire county: Rutland
- Ceremonial county: Rutland
- Region: East Midlands
- Country: England
- Sovereign state: United Kingdom
- Post town: OAKHAM
- Postcode district: LE15
- Dialling code: 01572
- Police: Leicestershire
- Fire: Leicestershire
- Ambulance: East Midlands
- UK Parliament: Rutland and Stamford

Barrow is a village and civil parish in the county of Rutland in the East Midlands of England. It is located about five miles (8 km) north-east of Oakham. At the 2011 census the population remained less than 100 and is included in the civil parish of Cottesmore.

The village's name means 'Burial-mound/hill', probably signifying to the one on the crest of the hill near The Green.
