= Thorpe by Water =

Village in Rutland, England

Coordinates: 52.559°N 0.685°W

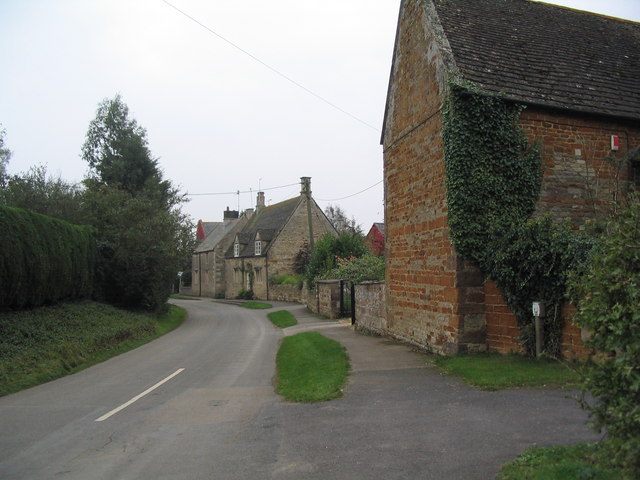
- Entrance to Thorpe by Water

- Location within Rutland
- Area: 1.08 sq mi (2.8 km^{2})
- Population: 56 2001 Census
  - Density: 52/sq mi (20/km^{2})
- OS grid reference: SP892965
  - London: 77 miles (124 km) SSE
- Unitary authority: Rutland
- Shire county: Rutland
- Ceremonial county: Rutland
- Region: East Midlands
- Country: England
- Sovereign state: United Kingdom
- Post town: OAKHAM
- Postcode district: LE15
- Dialling code: 01572
- Police: Leicestershire
- Fire: Leicestershire
- Ambulance: East Midlands
- UK Parliament: Rutland and Stamford

Thorpe by Water is a village and civil parish in the county of Rutland in the East Midlands of England. The population at the 2001 Census was 56. At the 2011 Census the population remained less than 100 and is included in the civil parish of Seaton.

The village's name means 'outlying farm/settlement'. 'By water' refers to the nearby River Welland.
