= Braunston-in-Rutland =

Village and civil parish in Rutland, England

Coordinates: 52.65°N 0.77°W

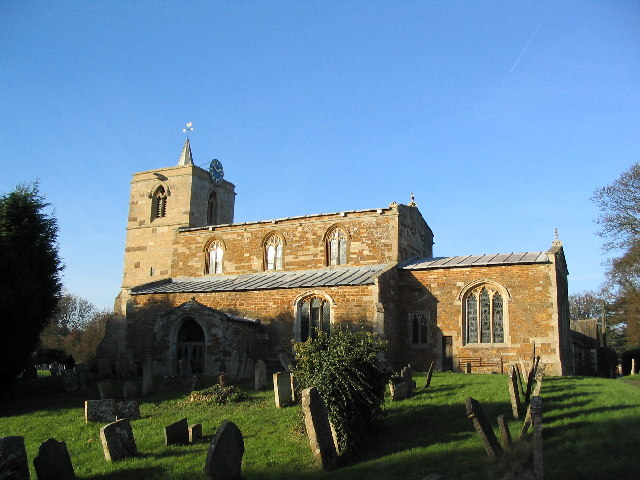
- All Saints' Church

- Location within Rutland
- Area: 2.5 sq mi (6.5 km^{2})
- Population: 392 2001 Census
  - Density: 157/sq mi (61/km^{2})
- OS grid reference: SK834069
  - London: 84 miles (135 km) SSE
- Unitary authority: Rutland
- Shire county: Rutland
- Ceremonial county: Rutland
- Region: East Midlands
- Country: England
- Sovereign state: United Kingdom
- Post town: OAKHAM
- Postcode district: LE15
- Dialling code: 01572
- Police: Leicestershire
- Fire: Leicestershire
- Ambulance: East Midlands
- UK Parliament: Rutland and Stamford

Braunston-in-Rutland is a village and civil parish in the county of Rutland in the East Midlands of England. The population of the civil parish was 392 at the 2001 census, including Brooke and increasing to 502 at the 2011 census. Leicestershire lies on the parish's western boundary

The village's name means 'farm/settlement of Brant'. Alternatively, the personal name could be 'Brandr', a Scandinavian name.

Braunston is located roughly three miles (4.8 km) south-west of the county town of Oakham. The River Gwash flows through the village. The village retains two public houses, The Old Plough, and the 17th-century Blue Ball Inn.

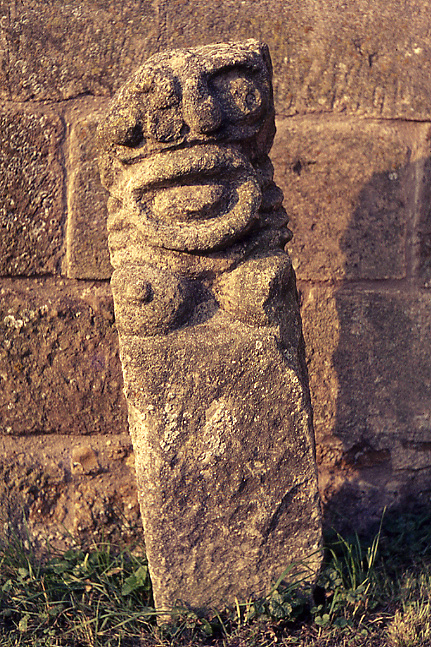
The enigmatic "goddess"

== All Saints' Church ==
All Saints' Church has a circular churchyard. A sculpted stone stands in the churchyard, at the west end of the church, close to the tower. Known as the Braunston "Goddess", it was found in about 1920 when the church doorstep needed to be replaced; when the slab was lifted, the carving was revealed on the underside. There has been considerable speculation as to its age and meaning, and its original position as part of the church building, or whether it may even predate the church. It is not a gargoyle as it has no drainage channel. It may have had an apotropaic purpose.
