= Manton, Rutland =

Village in Rutland, England

Coordinates: 52.631°N 0.700°W

Manton
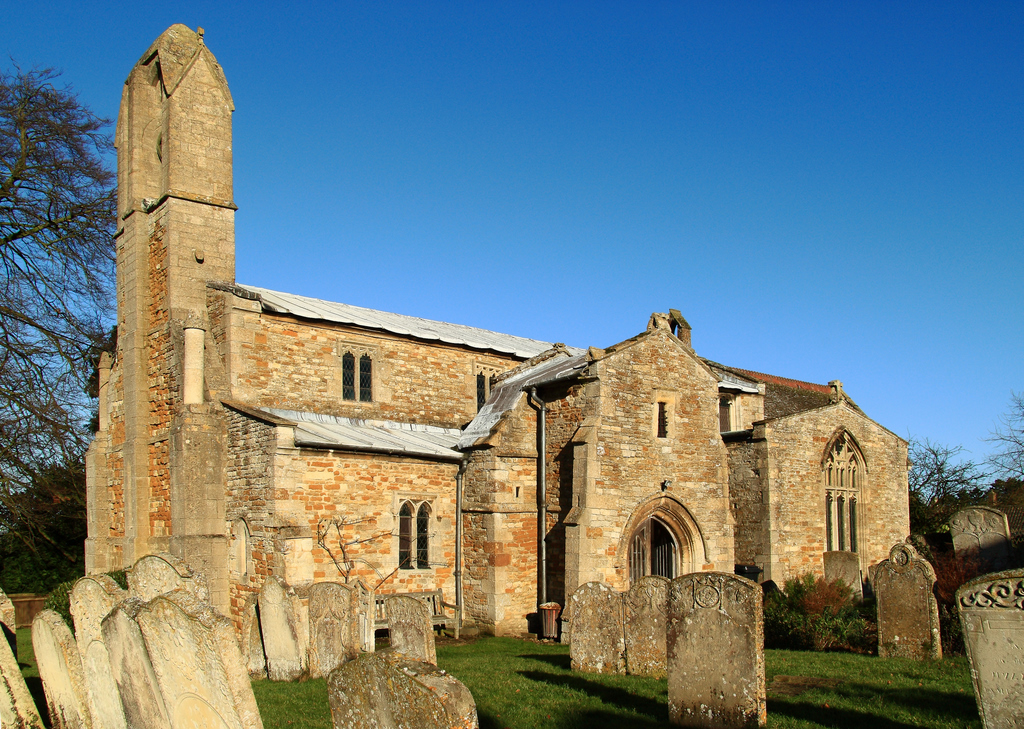
- St Mary's Church, Manton

- Location within Rutland
- Area: 1.85 sq mi (4.8 km^{2})
- Population: 364 2001 Census
  - Density: 197/sq mi (76/km^{2})
- OS grid reference: SK880045
  - London: 82 miles (132 km) SSE
- Unitary authority: Rutland
- Shire county: Rutland
- Ceremonial county: Rutland
- Region: East Midlands
- Country: England
- Sovereign state: United Kingdom
- Post town: OAKHAM
- Postcode district: LE15
- Dialling code: 01572
- Police: Leicestershire
- Fire: Leicestershire
- Ambulance: East Midlands
- UK Parliament: Rutland and Stamford

Manton is a village in the county of Rutland in the East Midlands of England. It lies south-west of Rutland Water. The population of the civil parish at the 2001 census was 364, and after including Gunthorpe decreased slightly to 359 at the 2011 census.

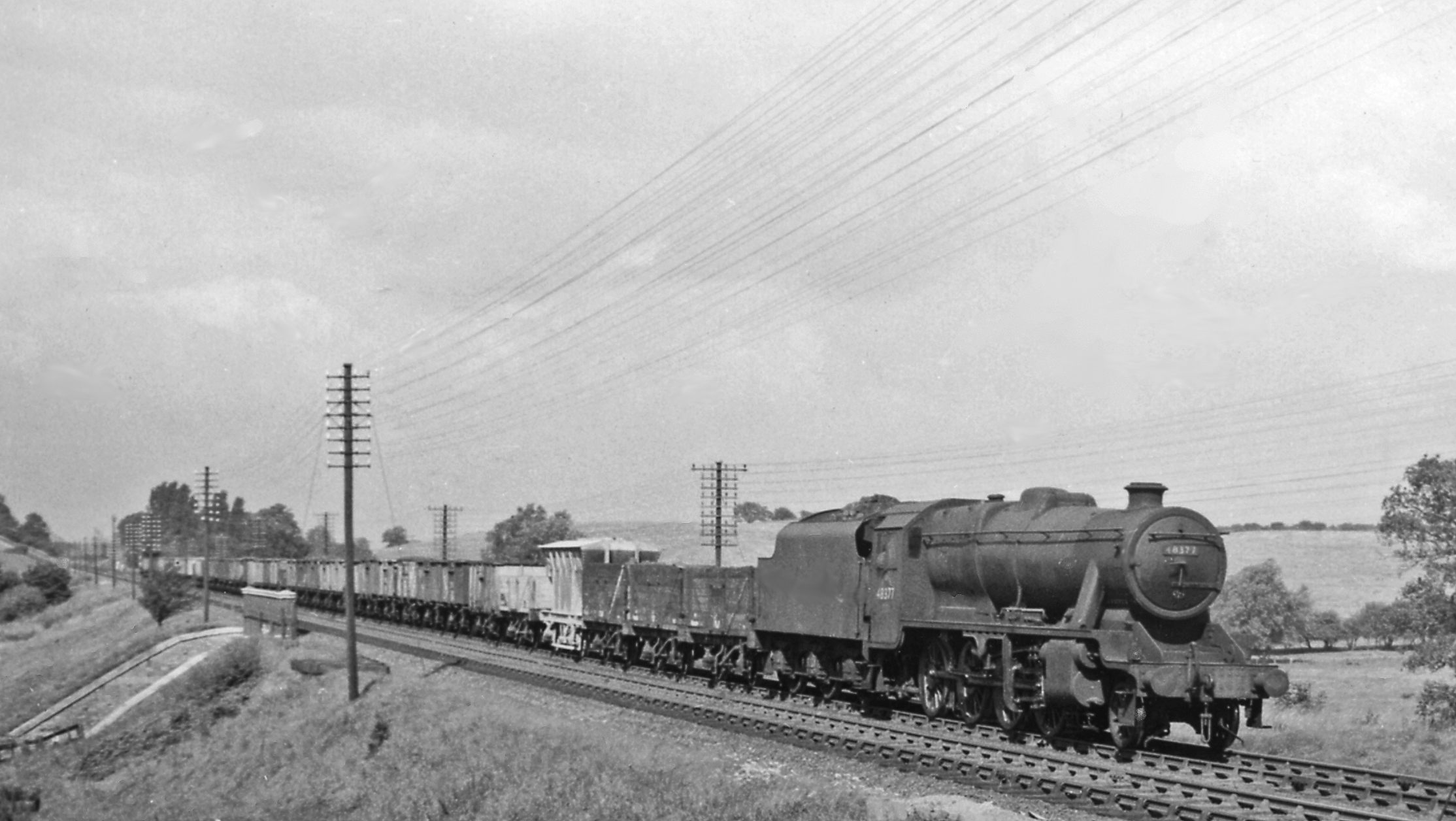
Manton up coal train under British Railways.

== History ==
The name of the village probably means "farm/settlement of Manna" or "communal farm/settlement".

Manton does not appear in the 1086 Domesday Book, but may have been one of seven outlying estates of the king's manor of "Hameldune Cherchesoch". One of the early mentions of Manton Manor dates from the reign of Henry I (1100–1135). It remained a dominant feature of the village until the early 20th century, although it changed hands many times between the Abbots of Cluny, the Kings of England and those they rewarded.

Manton stands on high ground with good water wells that remain in St Mary's Road and Priory Road. The placenames refer to the Priory College of Blessed Mary, founded in 1356 by Sir William Wade, and active until the dissolution of the monasteries, when the land was given to Gregory, Baron Cromwell.

A main route between London and Yorkshire passed through in the 16th century. The main occupations were pasturing of sheep, cattle and horses, and farming of grass, wheat and other crops.

Its central point remains a small village green with lime trees planted to mark the coronation of King George V in 1911. Many larger stone houses and slate-roofed cottages still stand amid the later buildings. The public services that remain include a church, a pub, a village hall, a residential home and an antique shop. The environment changed radically with the emergence of Rutland Water in the 1970s.

== Transport ==
Manton is served by an hourly daytime bus service, Monday to Friday, between Oakham and Corby.

The village had a railway station, Manton Junction, situated to the south of the village. It closed in the 1960s and the station buildings are now used as a factory. The line remains and passes underneath the village through a tunnel.

== Attractions ==
Manton has a number of attractions, including the newly refurbished Horse and Jockey. This is the only pub on the cycle route around Rutland Water. A second public house, the Blue Ball Inn, was located on Priory Road, next to the village hall. It closed in the 1970s and converted into residential accommodation.

The village's outdoor Chater Close playground and skate ramps are popular with children.
