= Uppingham =

Town in Rutland, England

Coordinates: 52.5900°N 0.7222°W

- Town
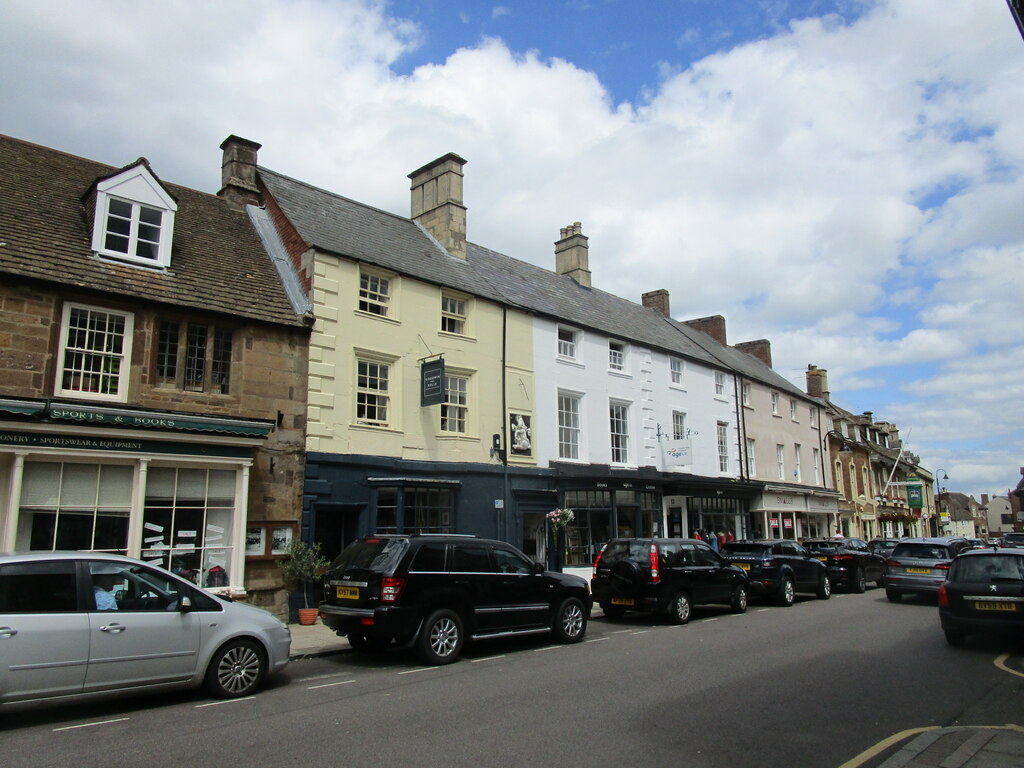
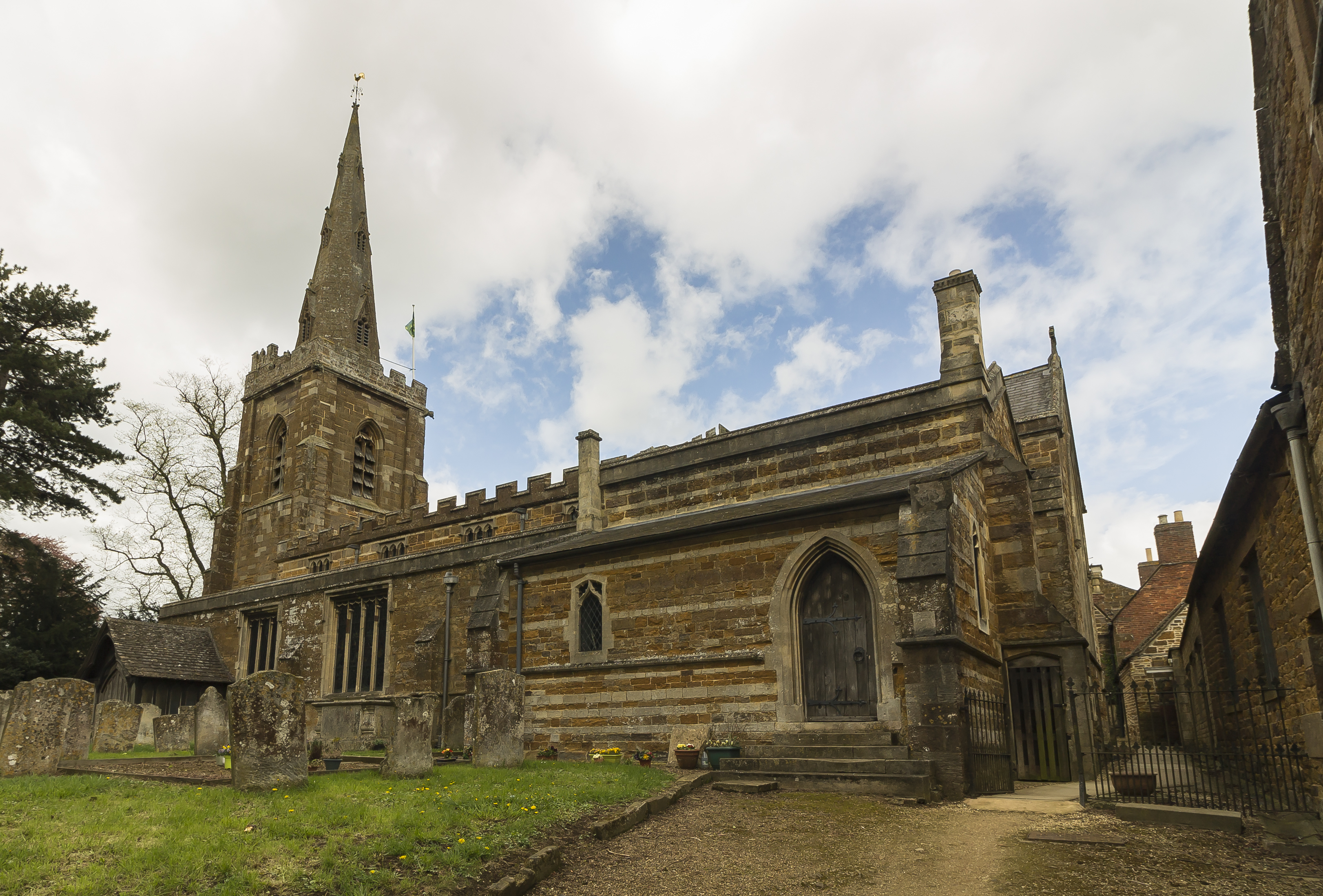
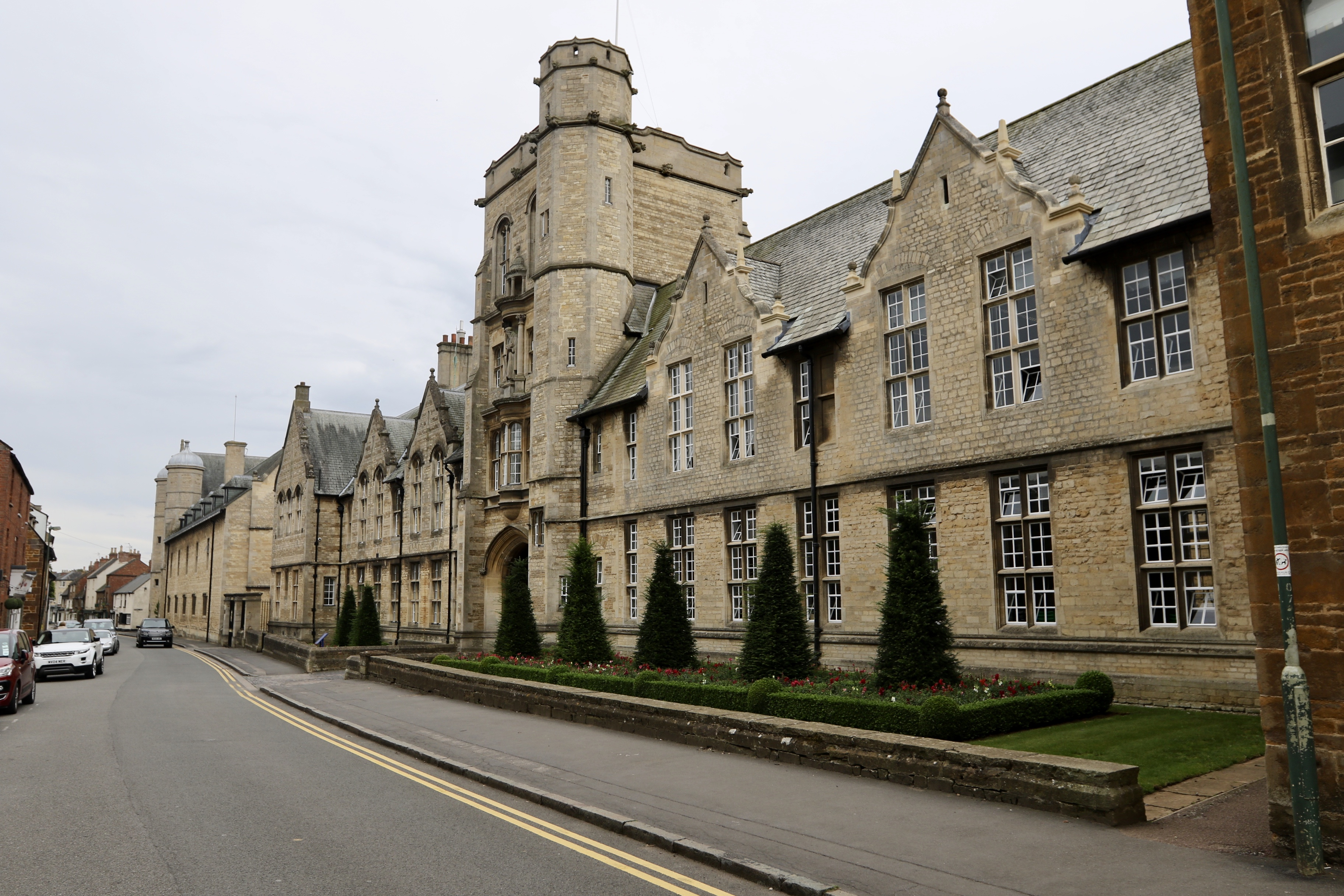
- High Street Church of St Peter and St Paul Uppingham School

- Location within Rutland
- Population: 4,745 Census 2011
- OS grid reference: SP865999
- Unitary authority: Rutland
- Ceremonial county: Rutland
- Region: East Midlands
- Country: England
- Sovereign state: United Kingdom
- Post town: OAKHAM
- Postcode district: LE15
- Dialling code: 01572
- Police: Leicestershire
- Fire: Leicestershire
- Ambulance: East Midlands
- UK Parliament: Rutland and Stamford
- Website: https://www.uppinghamtowncouncil.gov.uk/

Uppingham is a market town and civil parish in the ceremonial county of Rutland, England, off the A47 between Leicester and Peterborough, 6 miles (10 km) south of Oakham. It had a population of 4,745 according to the 2011 census, estimated at 4,853 in 2019.

The town is known for its eponymous public school. With its art galleries Uppingham has become a popular destination for art lovers. Uppingham was named "best place to live in the Midlands in 2022" by The Times newspaper, who commented on the town by calling it "a discerning market town with art, heart and smarts — plus the magnificent Rutland Water".

== Toponymy ==
The name of the town means 'Homestead/village of the Yppingas (upland people)'. It stands on a high ridge near Beaumont Chase, hence "upland".

== History ==
A little over 1 mile (1.6 km) to the north-west at Castle Hill are the earthwork remains of a medieval motte and bailey castle. Uppingham became a market town in 1281 when the lord of the manor was given the right to hold a weekly market.

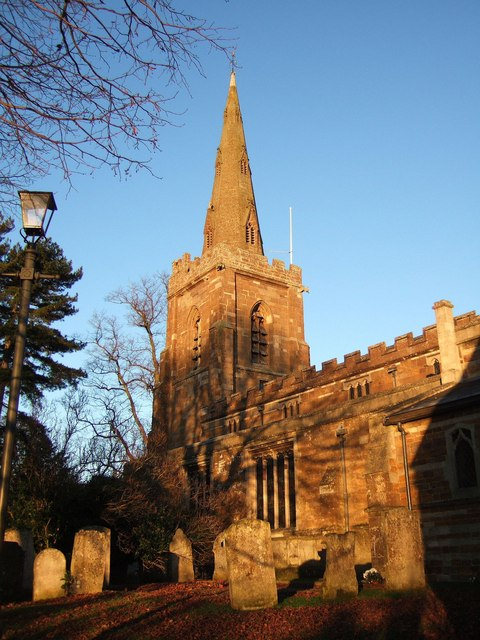
Parish church of St Peter and St Paul

The town has two active churches; The Church of St Peter and St Paul, a largely 14th-century Church of England parish church and the Methodist Church on Orange street, built as a Wesleyan Chapel in 1819 and expanded in the 1870s and 1880s.

Uppingham Workhouse was first recorded in 1777 with space for 40 inmates. Until 1834 it was a parish workhouse, but in 1836 the Uppingham Poor Law Union began and a Union workhouse was built in Leicester Road to house 158, to a design by architect William Donthorne. In the First World War, the building was used as an auxiliary hospital staffed by a Voluntary Aid Detachment. The workhouse closed in 1929 and the building was taken over by Uppingham School, which uses it as a girls' boarding house called Constables.

The Eyebrook Reservoir near Uppingham was used by Avro Lancasters flying from RAF Scampton on the final practice run for Guy Gibson's 617 Squadron Dambusters before Operation Chastise, the attack on the Ruhr valley dams on the night of the 16–17 May 1943.

== Market ==
The weekly market is held on Fridays. The Market Place is transformed once a year in November into the only fatstock show still held in temporary penning in a traditional market town. The first recorded show was in 1889. In 2011, 140 sheep, 24 pigs and 20 cattle were entered. The event attracts farmers from the area to exhibit their prize livestock and then toast their acquaintances in The Falcon Hotel.

== Governance ==
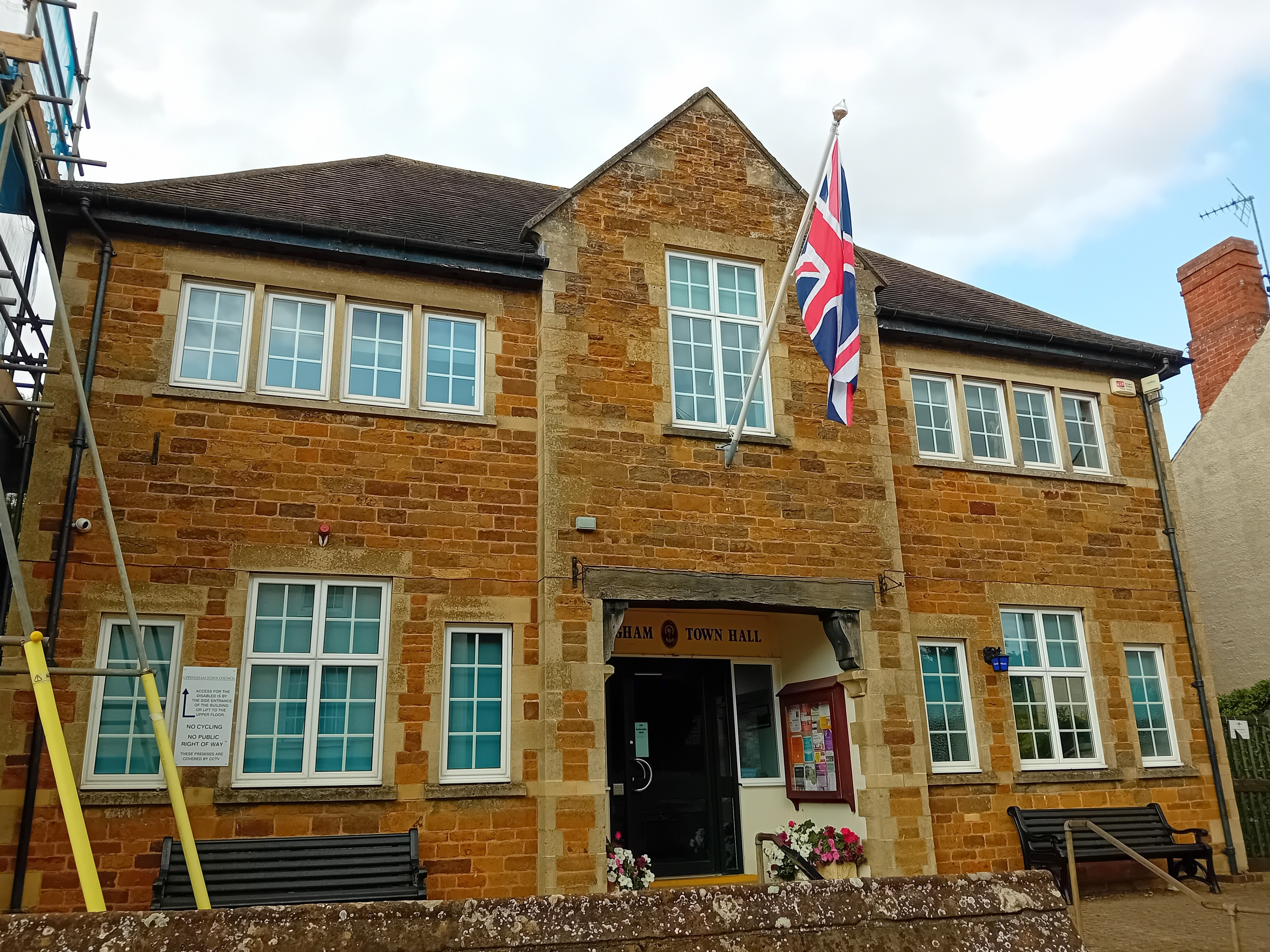
Uppingham Town Hall

There are two tiers of local government covering Uppingham, at parish (town) and unitary authority level: Uppingham Town Council and Rutland County Council. The town council is based at Uppingham Town Hall at 49 High Street East. Most local government functions are provided by the county council. The town council is responsible for services such as allotments, cemeteries and open spaces.

Uppingham was an ancient parish. When elected parish and district councils were created under the Local Government Act 1894, Uppingham was given a parish council and included in the Uppingham Rural District.

The rural district council was abolished in 1974 and its functions passed to Rutland District Council (renamed Rutland County Council on becoming a unitary authority in 1997). Also in 1974, Uppingham Parish Council bought the former Church Rooms at 49 High Street East, which had been built in 1932. In 1980, Uppingham Parish Council formally declared the parish to be a town for the purposes of the Local Government Act 1972, allowing it to change its name to Uppingham Town Council and appoint a mayor. The former Church Rooms were renamed the Town Hall at the same time.

== Education ==
State schooling in Uppingham is covered by a state secondary school, Uppingham Community College, and two primary schools: Leighfield and Uppingham C of E. A proposal to replace the primaries with a newly built school was rejected in 2007.

Uppingham School is an independent school for boarders aged 13 to 18, founded in 1584, charging fees and mainly for boys. Girls have been admitted since 1975.

== Art ==
Uppingham has several independent and internationally renowned art galleries. The Goldmark Gallery has been selling art from their Uppingham gallery for over 40 years and hold over 50,000 items in stock.

== Media ==
Local news and television programmes are provided by BBC East Midlands and ITV Central. Television signals are received from the Waltham TV transmitter.

Local radio stations are BBC Radio Leicester on 104.9 FM, Smooth East Midlands on 106.6 FM, Capital East Midlands on 105.4 FM, Hits Radio East Midlands on 106.0 FM, Greatest Hits Radio Midlands (which used to be Rutland Radio) on 107.2 FM, and Rutland and Stamford Sound, a community based radio station which broadcast on DAB.

The Rutland Mercury and Rutland Times are the local newspapers that serve the town.

== Transport ==
=== Rail ===
The nearest railway station is Oakham – 6 miles (10 km) north – on the cross-country line between Birmingham, Leicester and Peterborough. Alternatively, Corby station 9 miles (14 km) south on the Oakham branch of the Midland Main Line provides frequent services to London.

Uppingham railway station, at the end of a branch line from Seaton, was opened in 1894 and was located at the end of Queen Street. Passenger services were withdrawn in 1960 and the line closed completely in 1964. The station area has now been redeveloped as an industrial estate. Although the operational railway line runs closest to Uppingham at Manton Junction, it has no station.

=== Roads ===
An east-west A47 bypass opened in June 1982, providing a link to Peterborough and Leicester. The A6003 runs through the town and links Uppingham with Oakham, Corby and Kettering.

=== Buses ===
Centrebus operates the majority of bus services. The main routes link the town with Oakham, Corby, Leicester (via the 747 Uppingham–Leicester), Peterborough and Stamford. Buses are also run by Bland’s.

== Sport ==
Uppingham plays host to a number of different sports; in particular football, where Uppingham Town F.C play their games at Tod's Piece. Uppingham Town Cricket Club's new ground opened in 2011. Uppingham School's new sports centre was opened by Lord Coe in 2010.

== Town Partnership ==
'Uppingham Town Partnership' is a not-for-profit community group with the support of the Town Council and Rutland County Council, dedicated to ensuring the town is a great place to live, work and play. Its volunteers organise annual events including "Uppingham Feast Day" (a live music festival with street entertainment, food and drink) held in June and Christmas in Uppingham (a festive celebration with late night shopping in the local shops, visiting market-stalls and yuletide street entertainment). The group of volunteers also supports and raises funds for other events such "Uppingham Films" which screens movies in the Town Hall, and supports 'Uppingham in Bloom' which has become a multiple gold-medal winner with Britain in Bloom. It is not to be confused with Uppingham First, which is an unelected business partnership.
