= Seaton, Rutland =

Village in Rutland, England

Coordinates: 52.572°N 0.663°W

Seaton
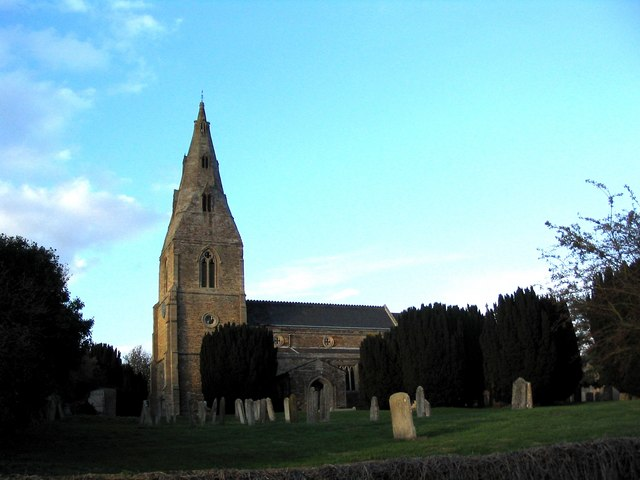
- All Hallows Church, Seaton

- Location within Rutland
- Area: 2.26 sq mi (5.9 km^{2})
- Population: 178 2001 Census
  - Density: 79/sq mi (31/km^{2})
- OS grid reference: SP904982
  - London: 78 miles (126 km) SSE
- Unitary authority: Rutland
- Shire county: Rutland
- Ceremonial county: Rutland
- Region: East Midlands
- Country: England
- Sovereign state: United Kingdom
- Post town: OAKHAM
- Postcode district: LE15
- Dialling code: 01572
- Police: Leicestershire
- Fire: Leicestershire
- Ambulance: East Midlands
- UK Parliament: Rutland and Stamford

Seaton is a village and civil parish in the county of Rutland in the East Midlands of England. The population of the civil parish was 178 at the 2001 census, including Stoke Dry and Thorpe by Water, increasing to 250 at the 2011 census. Nearby is the large Seaton Viaduct, on the Oakham to Kettering railway line. It is three quarters of a mile long and took four years to build. It has 82 arches which are up to 72 feet (22 m) high. For many years the railway was only used for freight traffic, but a restricted passenger service from Oakham to London via Corby and Kettering was opened in 2010. Seaton railway station, on a different line, closed in 1966.

The toponym, first recorded in the Domesday Book as Seieton and Segentone, is of uncertain origin. It probably means the "farm or village of a man named Sǣġa", but it may refer to an otherwise unrecorded stream name Sǣġe, meaning "slow-moving".

Thomas Minot, later Archbishop of Dublin, became parson here in 1351.

Major-General Robert Overton a prominent soldier and scholar who supported Parliament during the Wars of the Three Kingdoms and served in the New Model Army, died here in 1678, although he was subsequently buried in London.

When Henry Royce (founder of Rolls-Royce) was created a baronet, he took Seaton as his territorial designation. His family had worked here as millers.

The village has one public house - the George and Dragon, on Main Street. The railway station site is a private home and scrapyard. Established in 1969, Seaton Salvage and Recycling Centre is a 3rd-generation, family-run business; it has announced its closure in 2026.

In the east of the parish is Seaton Meadows SSSI.

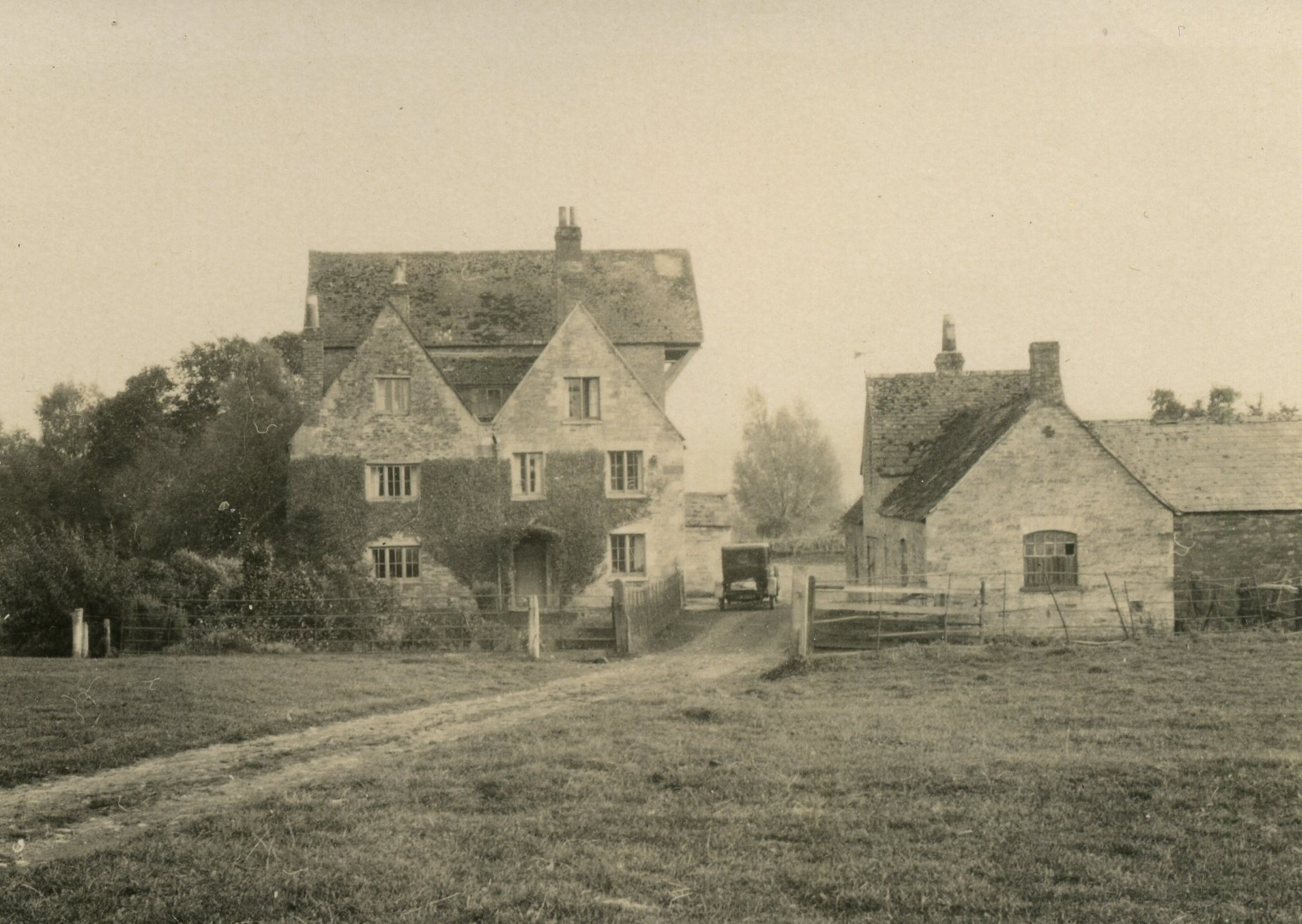
Seaton Mill in the early 20th century

== Sources ==
- Taft, Barbara (2004). "Overton, Robert (1608–1678)". Oxford Dictionary of National Biography (online ed.). Oxford University Press. doi:10.1093/ref:odnb/20795. (Subscription, Wikipedia Library access or UK public library membership required.)
