= Grade II* listed buildings in Rutland =

There are over 20,000 Grade II* listed buildings in England. This page is a list of the 71 of these buildings in the county of Rutland.

Rutland shown in England

Name	Location	Type	Completed (Note: The date given is the date used by Historic England as significant for the initial building or that of an important part in the structure's description.)	Date designated	Grid ref. (Note: The grid reference is based on the British national grid reference system, sometimes known as OSGB36, used by the Ordnance Survey.) Geo-coordinates	Entry number (Note: The "List Entry Number" is a unique number assigned to each listed building and scheduled monument by Historic England.)	Image
Church of St Mary	Ayston, Rutland	Parish Church	13th century	10 November 1955	SK8594800964; 52°35′59″N 0°43′57″W	1361553	Church of St Mary More images
Church of St Peter	Barrowden, Rutland	Church	C13-C15	10 November 1955	SP9449399906; 52°35′20″N 0°36′24″W	1361433	Church of St Peter More images
Durant Farmhouse, Barn, Outhouses and Wall	Barrowden, Rutland	Farmhouse	Late C16-Early 17th century	10 November 1955	SK9455700071; 52°35′25″N 0°36′20″W	1073957	Durant Farmhouse, Barn, Outhouses and Wall More images
Church of St Peter	Belton-in-Rutland, Rutland	Church	Early 13th century	10 November 1955	SK8163201349; 52°36′14″N 0°47′46″W	1214903	Church of St Peter More images
Old Hall	Belton-in-Rutland, Rutland	House	Late 16th century	10 November 1955	SK8159201365; 52°36′14″N 0°47′48″W	1214952	Old Hall More images
Westbourne House	Belton-in-Rutland, Rutland	House	Mid 18th century	10 November 1955	SK8157801270; 52°36′11″N 0°47′49″W	1288345	Upload Photo
Church of All Saints	Braunston-in-Rutland, Rutland	Parish Church	12th century	14 June 1954	SK8325406592; 52°39′02″N 0°46′15″W	1214996	Church of All Saints More images
Hall Farmhouse	Braunston-in-Rutland, Rutland	Farmhouse	Late 16th century	14 June 1954	SK8324606554; 52°39′01″N 0°46′15″W	1215077	Hall Farmhouse
Quaintree Hall	Braunston-in-Rutland, Rutland	Base Cruck House	Late 13th century	14 June 1954	SK8327906756; 52°39′08″N 0°46′13″W	1214995	Quaintree Hall
Church of the Holy Cross	Burley, Rutland	Parish Church	Norman	14 June 1954	SK8830310215; 52°40′57″N 0°41′43″W	1073794	Church of the Holy Cross More images
Burley House entrance gates and gate piers	Burley on the Hill, Burley, Rutland	Gate	1700	18 September 1984	SK8836410452; 52°41′04″N 0°41′39″W	1177480	Burley House entrance gates and gate piers
Burley House terrace parapet, retaining wall and staircase	Burley on the Hill, Burley, Rutland	Terrace	18th century	18 September 1984	SK8842410152; 52°40′55″N 0°41′36″W	1073793	Upload Photo
Church of St John	Caldecott, Rutland	Parish Church	12th century	10 November 1955	SP8684093691; 52°32′03″N 0°43′16″W	1116288	Church of St John More images
Church of St Mary	Clipsham, Rutland	Church	12th century	6 June 1961	SK9701816363; 52°44′10″N 0°33′52″W	1361803	Church of St Mary More images
Clipsham Hall	Clipsham, Rutland	Country House	c. 1700	6 June 1961	SK9703516435; 52°44′13″N 0°33′51″W	1073244	Clipsham Hall More images
Manor Farmhouse and Outbuilding Range	Clipsham, Rutland	Farmhouse	Late C16-C17	6 June 1961	SK9706216172; 52°44′04″N 0°33′50″W	1361766	Manor Farmhouse and Outbuilding Range More images
Church of St Nicholas	Cottesmore, Rutland	Church	C12-C15	14 June 1954	SK9024913637; 52°42′46″N 0°39′56″W	1073252	Church of St Nicholas More images
Thor Missile Site at former RAF North Luffenham	Edith Weston, Rutland	Thor Missile Site	20th century	17 June 2011	SK9504404596; 52°37′51″N 0°35′50″W	1400806	Thor Missile Site at former RAF North Luffenham
Old Prebendal House	Empingham, Rutland	Clergy House	Late 17th century	14 June 1954	SK9514108468; 52°39′56″N 0°35′41″W	1361456	Old Prebendal House More images
Church of St Mary	Essendine, Rutland	Church	12th century	6 June 1961	TF0490212789; 52°42′09″N 0°26′56″W	1073881	Church of St Mary More images
Church of St Andrew	Glaston, Rutland	Parish Church	12th century	10 November 1955	SK8963200552; 52°35′43″N 0°40′41″W	1264584	Church of St Andrew More images
Church of St Andrew	Hambleton, Rutland	Parish Church	Norman	14 June 1954	SK8997207581; 52°39′31″N 0°40′17″W	1073753	Church of St Andrew More images
Old Hall, Gate Piers and Flanking Wall	Hambleton, Rutland	House	c. 1611	14 June 1954	SK8991106949; 52°39′10″N 0°40′20″W	1295255	Old Hall, Gate Piers and Flanking Wall More images
Fort Henry Pleasure House and flanking retaining Walls and Parapet	Exton Park, Horn, Rutland	Wall	Late 18th century	10 December 1981	SK9486212169; 52°41′56″N 0°35′52″W	1073724	Fort Henry Pleasure House and flanking retaining Walls and Parapet More images
The Priory	Ketton, Rutland	House	17th century	6 June 1961	SK9820404273; 52°37′38″N 0°33′02″W	1361471	The Priory More images
Old Hall	Langham, Rutland	Hall House	1665	14 June 1954	SK8447611154; 52°41′29″N 0°45′06″W	1295196	Upload Photo
Church of All Saints	Little Casterton, Rutland	Church	Earlier origin	6 June 1961	TF0180509909; 52°40′38″N 0°29′44″W	1361524	Church of All Saints More images
Tolethorpe Hall	Tolethorpe, Little Casterton, Rutland	Country House	Late 16th century or early 17th century	6 June 1961	TF0219410342; 52°40′52″N 0°29′23″W	1073802	Tolethorpe Hall More images
Church of St Martin	Lyndon, Rutland	Church	C13-14	14 June 1954	SK9073304421; 52°37′48″N 0°39′39″W	1177703	Church of St Martin More images
Lyndon Hall	Lyndon, Rutland	Country House	1671-3	14 June 1954	SK9069904363; 52°37′46″N 0°39′41″W	1361483	Lyndon Hall More images
Top Hall	Lyndon, Rutland	House	Late 17th century	14 June 1954	SK9072504783; 52°38′00″N 0°39′39″W	1361485	Top Hall More images
Church of St Mary	Manton, Rutland	Parish Church	Late 12th century	14 June 1954	SK8807004677; 52°37′58″N 0°42′01″W	1215415	Church of St Mary More images
Barn at Luffenham Hall	North Luffenham, Rutland	Barn	1555	10 November 1955	SK9354203260; 52°37′09″N 0°37′11″W	1073900	Upload Photo
Bede House Farmhouse	North Luffenham, Rutland	House	Early 15th century	29 June 1984	SK9328003418; 52°37′14″N 0°37′25″W	1073865	Bede House Farmhouse
Manor Farmhouse	North Luffenham, Rutland	Farmhouse	1640	10 November 1955	SK9324903464; 52°37′15″N 0°37′26″W	1073863	Manor Farmhouse More images
The Pastures	North Luffenham, Rutland	House	1901	29 June 1984	SK9310303405; 52°37′14″N 0°37′34″W	1361473	The Pastures More images
Chapel of the Hospitallers of St John the Evangelist and St Anne	Oakham, Rutland	Chapel	c. 1380	8 May 1950	SK8573208719; 52°40′10″N 0°44′01″W	1073262	Chapel of the Hospitallers of St John the Evangelist and St Anne More images
College House Sanatorium at Oakham School	Oakham, Rutland	Vicarage	c. 1330	8 May 1950	SK8601708842; 52°40′14″N 0°43′46″W	1073308	College House Sanatorium at Oakham School
Flores House	Oakham, Rutland	House	13th or 14th century	8 May 1950	SK8603508742; 52°40′10″N 0°43′45″W	1073313	Flores House More images
Hayne House	Oakham, Rutland	House	Early 18th century	8 May 1950	SK8571508863; 52°40′15″N 0°44′02″W	1073287	Hayne House More images
Old Grammar School, the Shakespeare Centre	Oakham, Rutland	Grammar School	1584	8 May 1950	SK8611208967; 52°40′18″N 0°43′41″W	1073309	Old Grammar School, the Shakespeare Centre More images
Yule House	Oakham, Rutland	House	Early 17th century	8 May 1950	SK8624808646; 52°40′07″N 0°43′34″W	1361755	Yule House More images
Church of St Nicholas	Pilton, Rutland	Parish Church	Perpendicular and earlier	10 November 1955	SK9146602932; 52°36′59″N 0°39′02″W	1215644	Church of St Nicholas More images
Church of St Peter and St Paul	Preston, Rutland	Parish Church	Late 12th/Early 13th century	10 November 1955	SK8700802371; 52°36′44″N 0°42′59″W	1361558	Church of St Peter and St Paul More images
Manor House	Preston, Rutland	House	Mid 16th century	10 November 1955	SK8719002456; 52°36′46″N 0°42′49″W	1178203	Manor House
2 Cross Lane	Preston, Rutland	House	Late 17th century	10 November 1955	SK8716602428; 52°36′46″N 0°42′51″W	1295182	2 Cross Lane
The Hall	Ryhall, Rutland	House	Medieval	6 June 1961	TF0360810783; 52°41′05″N 0°28′07″W	1361527	Upload Photo
Church of St Mary	South Luffenham, Rutland	Church	C12-C14	10 November 1955	SK9413301899; 52°36′24″N 0°36′41″W	1073877	Church of St Mary More images
South Luffenham Hall	South Luffenham, Rutland	Country House	Late 17th century	10 November 1955	SK9422601857; 52°36′23″N 0°36′36″W	1073873	South Luffenham Hall More images
Church of St Nicholas	Stretton, Rutland	Church	C12-C14	14 June 1954	SK9497315769; 52°43′52″N 0°35′42″W	1361819	Church of St Nicholas More images
Stocken Hall	Stretton, Rutland	Country House	Early 17th century	14 September 1979	SK9571918171; 52°45′10″N 0°35′00″W	1073203	Stocken Hall More images
Church of Holy Trinity	Teigh, Rutland	Church	13th century	14 June 1954	SK8648616012; 52°44′05″N 0°43′14″W	1361821	Church of Holy Trinity More images
Old Rectory	Teigh, Rutland	House	1740	14 June 1954	SK8652316019; 52°44′06″N 0°43′12″W	1073204	Old Rectory More images
Church of St Nicholas	Thistleton, Rutland	Church	14th century	14 June 1954	SK9133617976; 52°45′06″N 0°38′54″W	1177828	Church of St Nicholas More images
Manor House	Thorpe by Water, Rutland	House	1691	10 November 1955	SP8930396457; 52°33′31″N 0°41′03″W	1237065	Upload Photo
The Old Manor House	Thorpe by Water, Rutland	House	C1600-c1700	10 November 1955	SP8932696491; 52°33′32″N 0°41′02″W	1237181	Upload Photo
Church of All Saints	Tinwell, Rutland	Church	13th century	6 June 1961	TF0061206369; 52°38′45″N 0°30′52″W	1320402	Church of All Saints More images
Wall and Water Point East of Post Office, Nos 26 and 27, Crown Lane	Tinwell, Rutland	Garden Wall	1880	17 December 1984	TF0054206389; 52°38′45″N 0°30′55″W	1073782	Wall and Water Point East of Post Office, Nos 26 and 27, Crown Lane
Church of St Luke/St Mary Magdalen	Tixover, Rutland	Church	C12-C17	6 June 1961	SP9707899767; 52°35′13″N 0°34′07″W	1178264	Church of St Luke/St Mary Magdalen More images
Church of St Peter and St Paul	Uppingham, Rutland	Parish Church	14th century	10 November 1955	SP8667299606; 52°35′14″N 0°43′20″W	1073973	Church of St Peter and St Paul More images
Falcon Hotel Annexe and Nos 5 and 7, High Street East	Uppingham, Rutland	House	late C16-early 17th century	10 November 1955	SP8664599694; 52°35′17″N 0°43′21″W	1073181	Falcon Hotel Annexe and Nos 5 and 7, High Street East
The Hall	Uppingham, Rutland	House	1612	10 November 1955	SP8684799610; 52°35′15″N 0°43′10″W	1295156	Upload Photo
Uppingham Bookshop and the Sports Shop	Uppingham, Rutland	House	C16-C17	10 November 1955	SP8667499691; 52°35′17″N 0°43′19″W	1073182	Uppingham Bookshop and the Sports Shop More images
Uppingham School Chapel	Uppingham, Rutland	Chapel	1865	10 November 1955	SP8650499620; 52°35′15″N 0°43′29″W	1073175	Uppingham School Chapel
Uppingham School Library	Uppingham, Rutland	School	c. 1890	10 November 1955	SP8655299594; 52°35′14″N 0°43′26″W	1073172	Uppingham School Library More images
Uppingham School School Room	Uppingham, Rutland	Schoolroom	1861-3	10 November 1955	SP8649399643; 52°35′16″N 0°43′29″W	1073176	Uppingham School School Room More images
8 High Street West	Uppingham, Rutland	House	late C16-C17	10 November 1955	SP8656799695; 52°35′17″N 0°43′25″W	1295140	8 High Street West More images
Church of St Botolph	Wardley, Rutland	Parish Church	Early 13th century	10 November 1955	SK8319200193; 52°35′35″N 0°46′24″W	1180127	Church of St Botolph More images
The Windmill	Whissendine, Rutland	Flour Mill	1830-1840	4 February 1972	SK8235614242; 52°43′10″N 0°46′56″W	1073211	The Windmill More images
Church of St Michael	Whitwell, Rutland	Parish Church	13th century	14 June 1954	SK9236508804; 52°40′09″N 0°38′08″W	1295155	Church of St Michael More images
Church of St Peter and St Paul	Wing, Rutland	Parish Church	Medieval	10 November 1955	SK8937202979; 52°37′02″N 0°40′53″W	1215836	Church of St Peter and St Paul More images
Church of St Mary and St Andrew	Ridlington, Rutland	Parish Church	13th century	10 November 1955	SK8476802742; 52°21′57″N 0°26′45″W	1178331	Church of St Mary and St Andrew More images

== See also ==
- Grade I listed buildings in Rutland
