= Samuel Barker =

Samuel Barker may refer to:

- Samuel Barker (Canadian politician) (1839–1915), Canadian parliamentarian and lawyer
- Samuel Barker (MP for Cricklade) (died 1708), British member of Parliament for Cricklade
- Samuel Barker (Hebraist) (1686–1759), English Hebraist
