= Charles Ellicott =

British bishop (1819–1905)

The Right Reverend Charles Ellicott
- Bishop of Gloucester
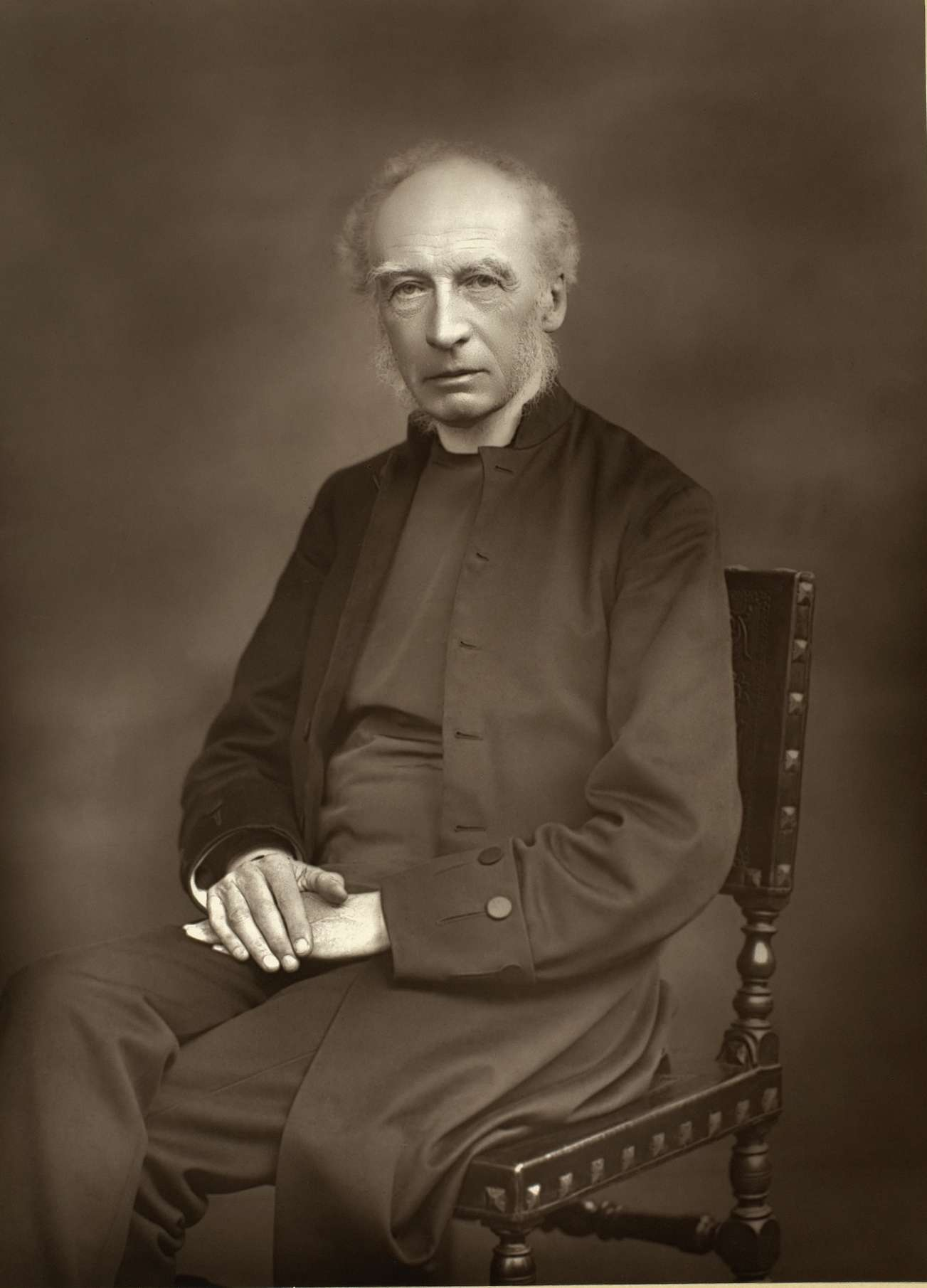
- Church: Church of England
- Province: Canterbury
- Diocese: Gloucester

Orders
- Ordination: 1848
- Consecration: 25 March 1863

Personal details
- Born: Charles John Ellicott; 25 April 1819 Whitwell, Rutland, England
- Died: 15 October 1905 (aged 86) Birchington-on-Sea, Kent, England
- Denomination: Anglicanism
- Spouse: Constantia Ann Becher
- Children: Arthur and Rosalind
- Education: Stamford School; St John's College, Cambridge

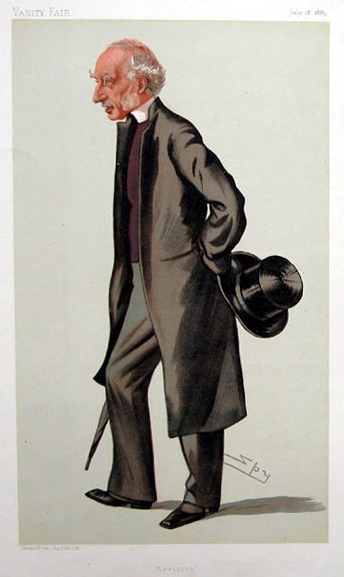
Ellicott as caricatured by Spy (Leslie Ward), July 1885.

Charles John Ellicott (25 April 1819 – 15 October 1905) was an English Christian theologian, academic and churchman. He briefly served as Dean of Exeter, then Bishop of the united see of Gloucester and Bristol.

== Early life and family ==
Ellicott was born in Whitwell, Rutland on 25 April 1819. He was educated at Stamford School and St John's College, Cambridge.

He married Constantia Ann Becher at St Marylebone Parish Church, London on 31 July 1848. One of their children was the composer Rosalind Ellicott.

== Ecclesiastical career ==
Following his ordination into the Anglican ministry in 1848, he was Vicar of Pilton, Rutland and then Professor of Divinity at King's College London and Hulsean Professor of Divinity at Cambridge. The chancel of St Nicholas' Church, Pilton was rebuilt in 1852 in 13th-century style.

In 1861, he was appointed Dean of Exeter. Two years later he was nominated the bishop of the See of Gloucester and Bristol on 6 February and consecrated on 25 March 1863. In 1897, Bristol was removed from Diocese, but he continued as Bishop of Gloucester until resigning on 27 February 1905. He died in Kent on 15 October 1905, aged 86.

== Works ==
- Historical Lectures on the Life of Our Lord Jesus Christ: Being the Hulsean Lectures for the Year 1859. With Notes, Critical, Historical, and Explanatory, 1862
- Destiny of the Creature, 1865
- Historical Lectures on the Life of Christ, 1870
- Modern Unbelief, its Principles and Characteristics, 1877
- Spiritual Needs in Country Parishes, 1888
- Sacred Study
- An Old Testament Commentary for English Readers, 1897 (Editor)
- A New Testament Commentary for English Readers, 1878 (Editor)
- St Paul's First Epistle to the Corinthians: With a Critical and Grammatical Commentary, 1887
- Our Reformed Church and its Present Troubles, 1897
- Some Present Dangers for the Church of England, 1878
- Addresses on the Revised Version of Holy Scripture, 1901
- Christus comprobator; or, The testimony of Christ to the Old Testament : seven address, 1892
- Considerations on the revision of the English version of the New Testament, 1870

Ellicott described the Commentary for English Readers which he edited as "an attempt to supply a need which has been long and seriously felt by meditative readers of God’s Holy Word".

== Bibliography ==
- Fryde, E. B.; Greenway, D. E.; Porter, S.; Roy, I., eds. (1986). Handbook of British Chronology (3rd, reprinted 2003 ed.). Cambridge: Cambridge University Press. ISBN 0-521-56350-X.

Church of England titles
Preceded by Thomas Hill Lowe	Dean of Exeter; 1861 – 1863	Succeeded by William Brodrick
Preceded by William Thomson	Bishop of Gloucester and Bristol; 1863–1897	Succeeded by Himself as Bishop of Gloucester; George Forrest Browne as Bishop of Bristol
New creation Separate see	Bishop of Gloucester; 1897–1905	Succeeded by Edgar Gibson
