= Thomas Barker (meteorologist) =

- Born: 1722; Lyndon, Rutland, England
- Died: 29 December 1809

Thomas Barker (1722 – 29 December 1809) was a Rutland squire who kept a detailed weather record at Lyndon Hall from 1736 to 1798.

== Life and work ==
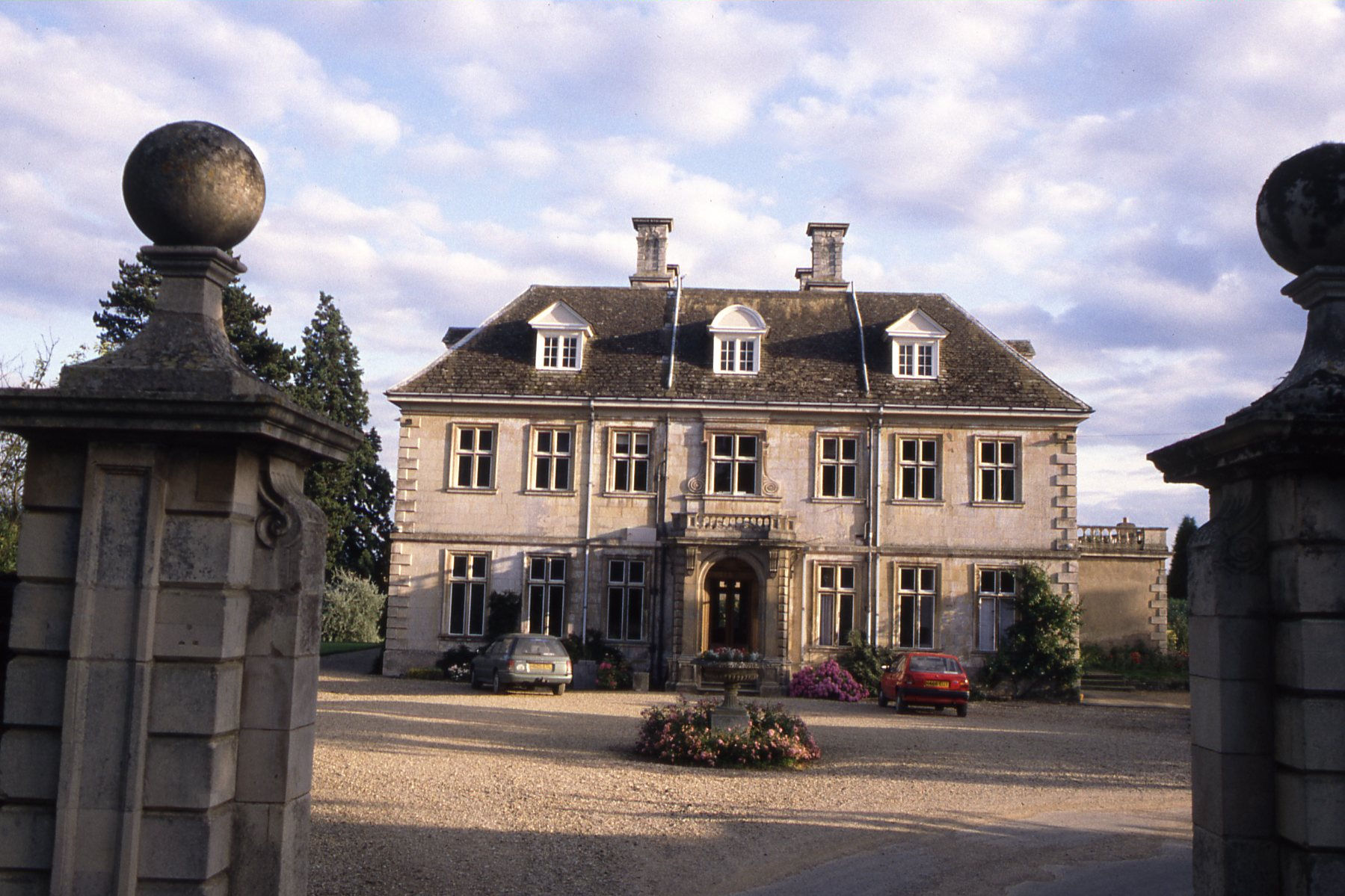
Lyndon Hall

Thomas Barker was born at Lyndon Hall, Lyndon, Rutland, England in 1722. The son of Samuel Barker and grandson of William Whiston, he came from a distinguished local family, which had lived in Lyndon from the time of Henry VIII. He married Anne White, sister of Gilbert White the famous naturalist. The couple had five children, a son and four daughters. Thomas Barker was a vegetarian, having discovered in early childhood that his constitution was unsuited to the consumption of meat.

Barker's meteorological records have proved a valuable resource for those researching the 18th-century British climate, because of its early date for instrumental observations, its length and the meticulousness with which it was compiled. He recorded barometric pressure, temperature, clouds, wind and rainfall. (In the early years his thermometer was indoors, in an unheated room, as was common at the time.) Barker's temperature data was amongst that used by Gordon Manley in compiling his Central England Temperature series.

Barker recorded during September 1749 what was clearly, from his careful description, a tornado:

A remarkable Meteor was seen in Rutland, which I suspect to have been of the same kind as Spouts at Sea…

It was a calm, warm and cloudy Day, with some Gleams and Showers; the Barometer low and falling, and the Wind South, and small. The Spout came between 5 and 6 in the evening; at 8 came a Thunder-Shower, and Storms of Wind, which did some Mischief in some places; and then it cleared up with a brisk N.W. Wind.

The earliest Account I have was from Seaton. A great Smoke rose over or near Gretton, in Northamptonshire, with the Likeness of Fire, either one single Flash, as the Miller said, or several bright Arrows darting to the Ground, and repeated for some Time, as others say. Yet some who saw it, did not think there was really any Fire in it, but that the bright Breaks in a black Cloud looked like it. However, the Whirling, Breaks, Roar, and Smoke frightened both Man and Beast. Coming down the Hill, it took up Water from the River Welland, and passing over Seaton Field, carried away several Shocks of Stubble; and crossing Glaiston, and Morcot Lordships, at Pilton Town's End tore off two Branches … I saw it pass from Pilton over Lyndon Lordship, like a black smoky Cloud, with bright Breaks; an odd whirling Motion, and a roaring Noise, like a distant Wind, or a great Flock of Sheep galloping along on hard Ground … As it went by a Quarter of a Mile East from me, I saw some Straws fall from it, and a Part, like an inverted Cone of Rain, reached down to the Ground. Some who were milking, said it came all round them like a thick Mist, whirling and parting, and, when that was past, a strong Wind for a very little while, though it was calm both before and after. It then passed off between Edithweston and Hambleton, but how much further I do not know.

Barker published a number of papers in the Philosophical Transactions of the Royal Society. As well as being a meteorologist, he was also an astronomer, publishing An Account of the Discoveries concerning Comets, with the Way to find their Orbits, and some Improvements in constructing and calculating their Places in 1757. He "provided a handy table for determining parabolic trajectories and orbits". He was the first modern astronomer to note the discrepancy between some ancient accounts of Sirius being a red star and its current blue-white colour. His journals include observations on the local flora and fauna in addition to the weather. He also wrote a number of theological books.

Thomas Barker died on 29 December 1809 and was buried in the churchyard of St Martin's Church, Lyndon on 3 January 1810.

== See also ==
- Barker's equation
