= Church of St Michael and All Angels, Whitwell =

Church in Whitwell, Rutland

Coordinates: 52°40′09″N 0°38′08″W

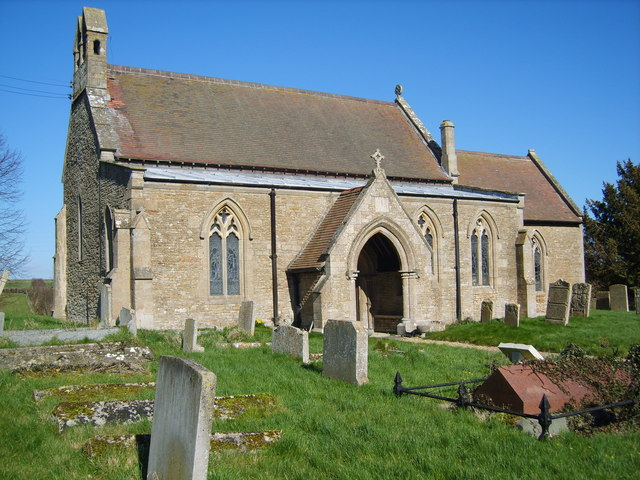
- Denomination: Church of England

History
- Dedication: St Michael, All Angels

Administration
- Diocese: Peterborough
- Parish: Whitwell, Rutland

The Church of St Michael and All Angels is a church in Whitwell, Rutland. It is a Grade II* listed building.

== History ==
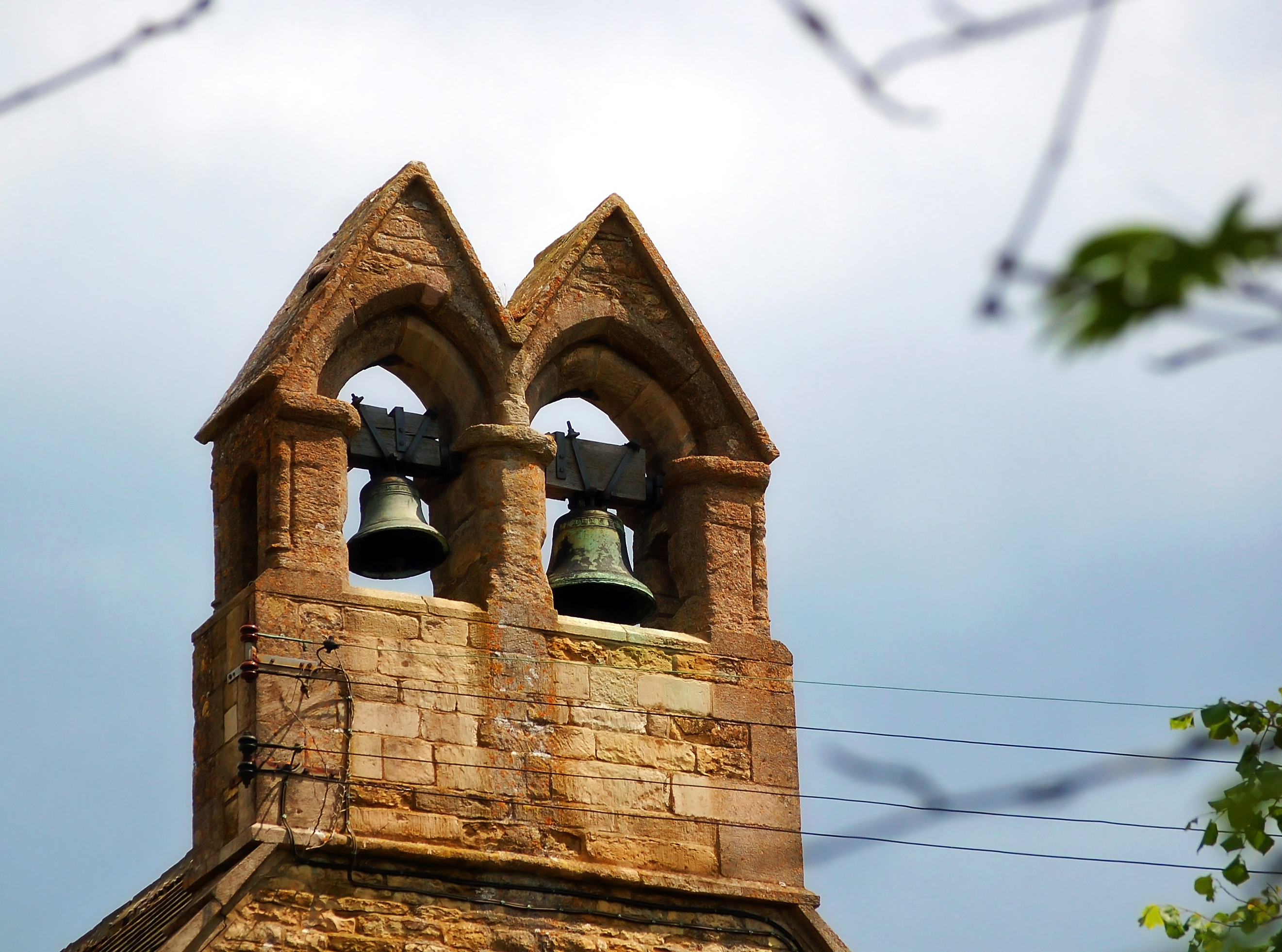
Bell-cote

The church consists of a south aisle, south porch, double bell-cote, chancel and nave.

A church has been present on this site since the Domesday Book of 1086.

The chancel was probably rebuilt in the 13th century and the bell-cote was added at the same time.

A new roof and new windows were added in the 14th century. The north wall of the nave was raised.

The church was restored in 1881 and the chapel in 1930.

Former rector, Charles Spencer Ellicott has a wall tablet which was placed by his son, Charles Ellicott, the Bishop of Bristol and Gloucester.
