= Eye Brook =

River in the East Midlands of England

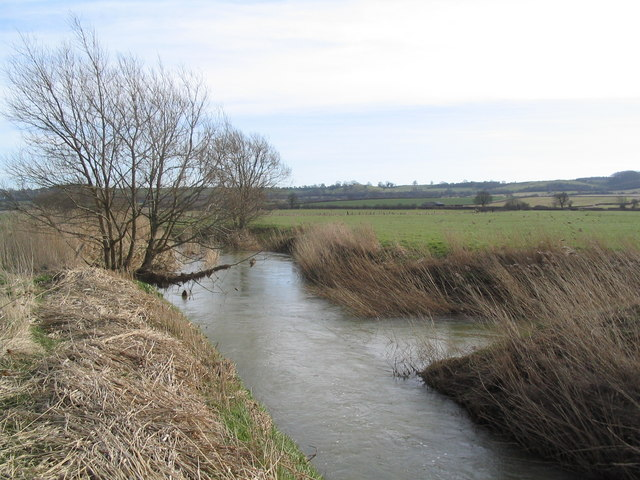
- Confluence of the Eye Brook and the River Welland

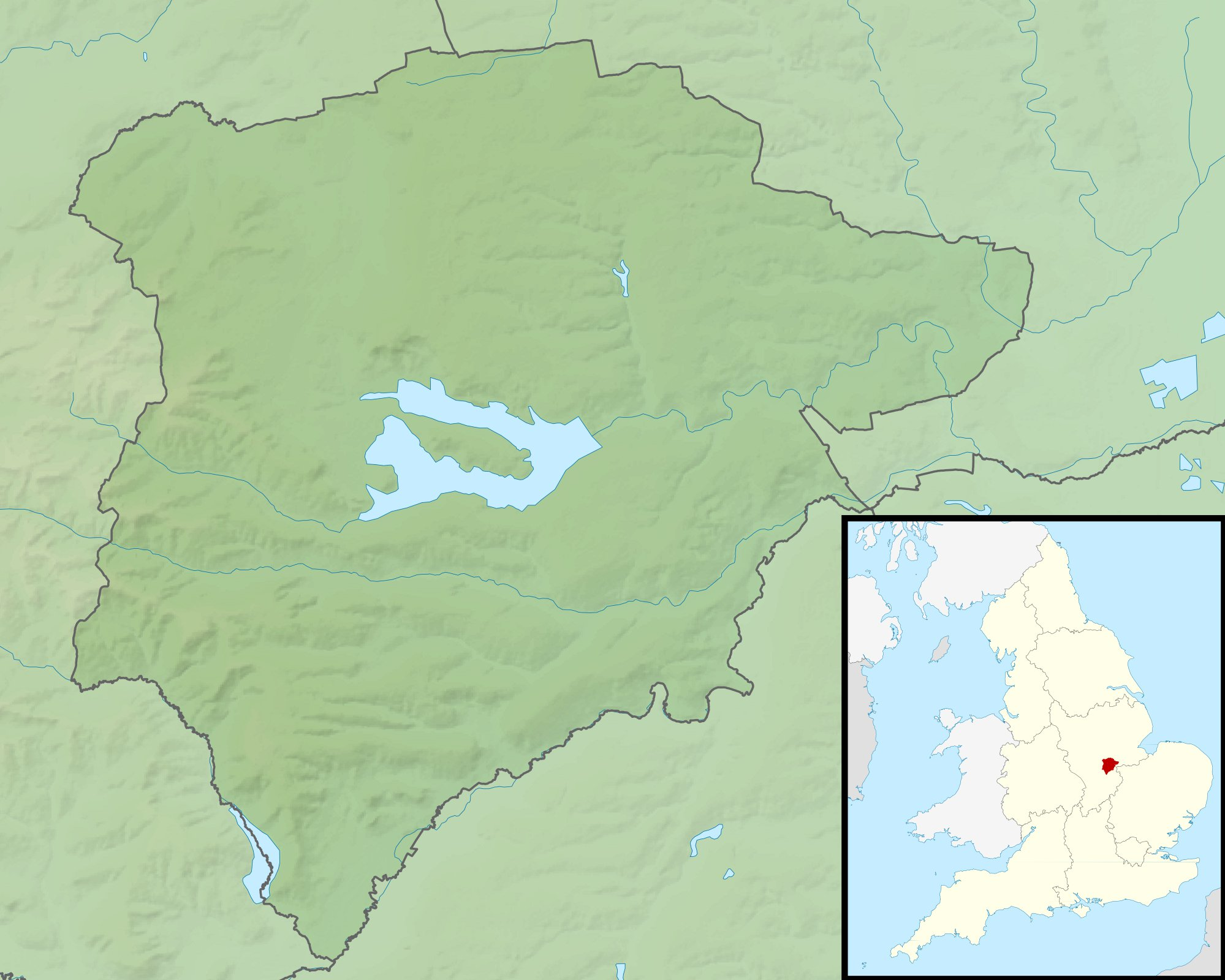
- Location of the river mouth in Rutland

Location
- Country: England
- Counties: Rutland, Leicestershire

Physical characteristics
- Source
  - location: Tilton on the Hill, Leicestershire
  - coordinates: 52.634877°N 0.921321°W
  - elevation: 203 m (666 ft)
- Mouth: River Welland
  - location: Caldecott, Rutland
  - coordinates: 52.529818°N 0.708942°W
  - elevation: 49 m (161 ft)
- Length: 29.4 km (18.3 mi)
- Basin size: 60.8 km^{2} (23.5 sq mi)

Basin features
- River system: River Welland

The Eye Brook is a watercourse in the East Midlands of England and a tributary of the River Welland. It is around 18 miles (29 km) long.

== Course ==
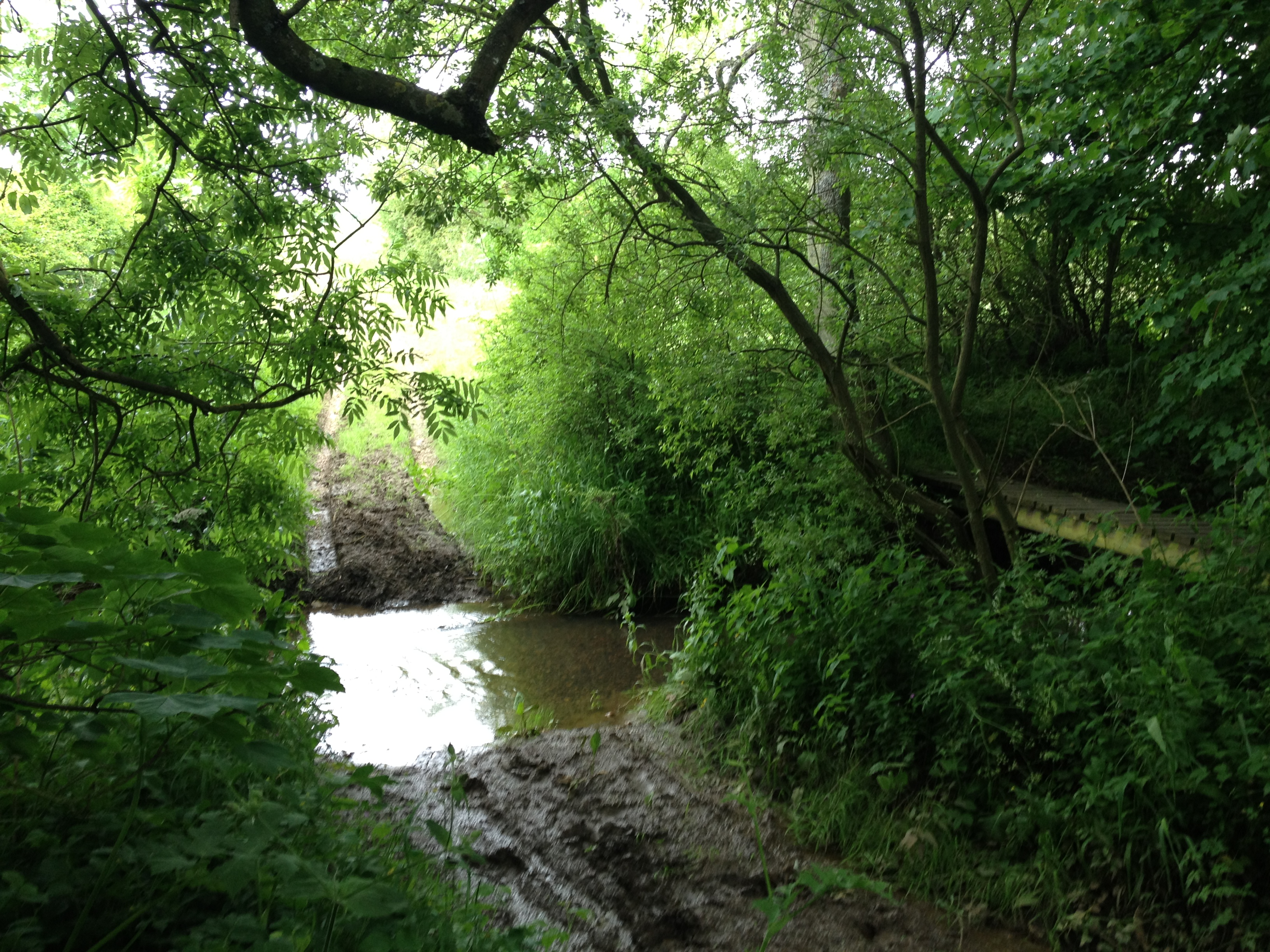
Bridleway ford on the Eye Brook at Tugby Wood, near Priest Hill

The Eye Brook rises between Tilton on the Hill and Skeffington in Leicestershire and flows east through a narrow valley towards East Norton. Near where it crosses the A47, it starts to form the county boundary between Leicestershire and Rutland, with Belton-in-Rutland to the north, and Allexton to the south. It then proceeds south-eastwards, passing the village of Stockerston. Between Stoke Dry and Caldecott it has been dammed to form the Eyebrook Reservoir. Shortly after the reservoir outfall, it joins the River Welland (here forming the border with Northamptonshire).

== Wildlife ==
Much of the land surrounding the area is a Site of Special Scientific Interest and a report by English Nature considered the river to be one of the most "natural" in the county having experienced very little human intervention.

The river holds a variety of fish species, including roach, dace and chub. Wild brown trout spawn in the lower reaches.

== Research ==
The Eye Brook Community Heritage Project, funded by the Heritage Lottery, documents the evolution of land use within the Brook's catchment, the management and use of natural resources associated with it, and the underlying ecology.

The Eye Brook catchment is also the location of The Allerton Project, a research and demonstration farm run by the Game and Wildlife Conservation Trust investigating the effects of different farming methods on wildlife and the environment.

== Status ==
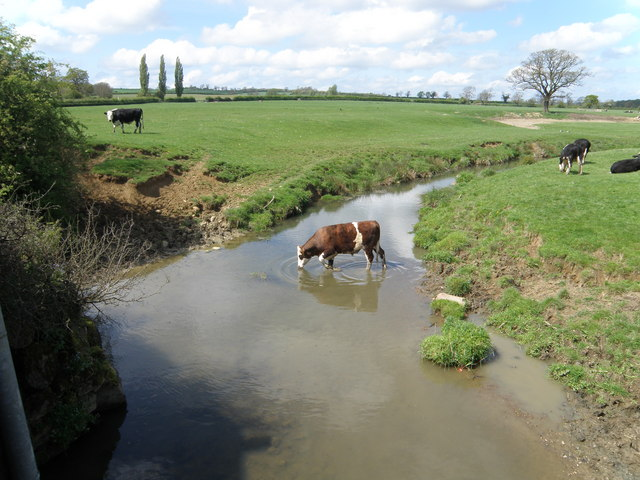
The Eye Brook above the reservoir, near Beaumont Chase Farm

In 2016, the overall classification of the Eye Brook was "Poor" under the Water Framework Directive, having shown a significant decline in ecological condition since 2013. Reasons for this include the effect of poor livestock management and treated sewage effluent on plant life and the presence of the invasive Signal crayfish.
