= Lionel Cox (priest) =

Archdeacon of Madras (1910–1922)

Lionel Edgar Cox (died 6 December 1945) was an English cleric, Archdeacon of Madras from 1910 to 1922.

Cox was educated at Durham University and Dorchester Missionary College and was ordained in 1894. After a curacy in Kandy he served at Kalutara, Black Town, Vepery and Bangalore. He was also, from 1907 to 1918, Domestic Chaplain to Henry Whitehead, Bishop of Madras.

From 1922 to 1929, Cox was rector of Lyndon, Rutland.
