= Allexton =

Village in Leicestershire, England

Coordinates: 52.595°N 0.797°W

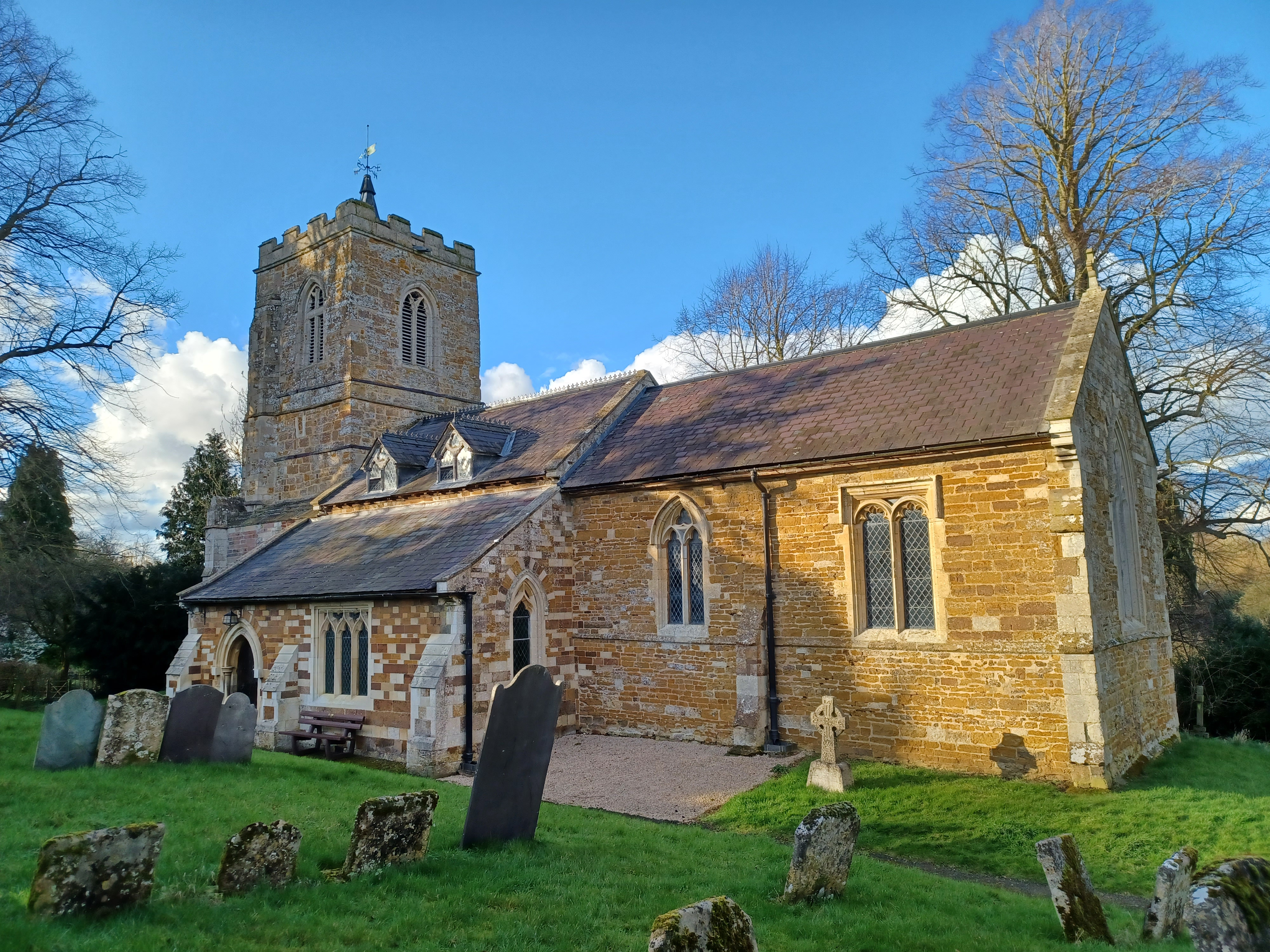
- Parish Church

- Location within Leicestershire
- Population: 58 (2001)
- OS grid reference: SK818003
- District: Harborough
- Shire county: Leicestershire
- Region: East Midlands
- Country: England
- Sovereign state: United Kingdom
- Post town: Oakham
- Postcode district: LE15
- Police: Leicestershire
- Fire: Leicestershire
- Ambulance: East Midlands
- UK Parliament: Rutland and Stamford

Allexton is a village and civil parish in the Harborough district of Leicestershire, England. According to the 2001 census, the parish had a population of 58. At the 2011 census the population of the village remained less than 100. Details are included in the civil parish of Horninghold.

The village's name means 'farm/settlement of Æthellac or Athellak'.

The Eye Brook forms the county boundary with Rutland, on the other side of which is Belton-in-Rutland. It is also the boundary between the dioceses of Leicester and Peterborough. The A47 runs east–west between the villages and the Hallaton Road links Allexton with Hallaton.

The parish church of St Peter's, Allexton is in the care of the Churches Conservation Trust. The parish has been merged with Hallaton as part of the united benefice with the parishes of East Norton, Tugby, Slawston and Horninghold. St Peter's Church was originally built between 1160 and 1180 but there have been several modifications, including the additions of a tower and side aisles, and a major restoration in 1862 by William Millican.

Allexton is a farming parish of around 1000 acres with a mixture of arable, grazing and woodland. The grazing is for sheep and horses and there is an equestrian centre at Allexton Hall. Two lakes and woodland surrounding the hall provide fishing and shooting facilities. Until the 1920s almost all the houses and land were part of the Allexton Hall estate. The only old houses are the Old Rectory, Bridge House (formerly the Wilson's Arms) and the Cottage. The current Hall was rebuilt in 1902 but there have been other buildings on the site since Tudor times. In the 13th century the Lord lived in a fortalice (a moated manor house) the remains of which lie buried in a field adjacent to the present hall.
