= Caldecott, Rutland =

Village in Rutland, England

Coordinates: 52.54°N 0.72°W

Caldecott
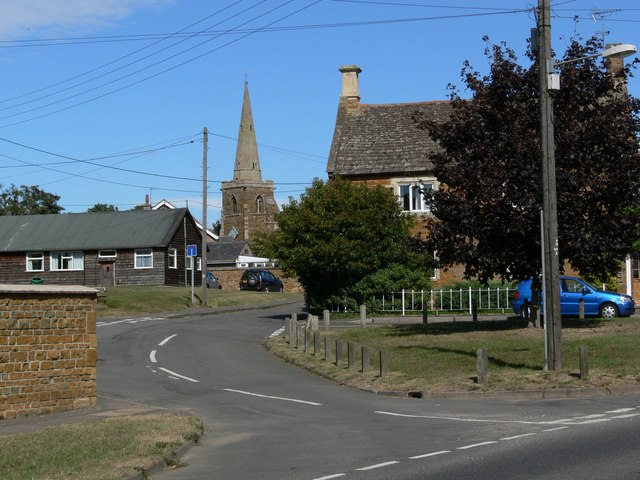
- Across the village green

- Location within Rutland
- Area: 1.82 sq mi (4.7 km^{2})
- Population: 256 (2001 Census)
  - Density: 140/sq mi (54/km^{2})
- OS grid reference: SP868937
  - London: 76 miles (122 km) SSE
- Unitary authority: Rutland
- Ceremonial county: Rutland
- Region: East Midlands
- Country: England
- Sovereign state: United Kingdom
- Post town: MARKET HARBOROUGH
- Postcode district: LE16
- Dialling code: 01536
- Police: Leicestershire
- Fire: Leicestershire
- Ambulance: East Midlands
- UK Parliament: Rutland and Stamford

Caldecott is a village in the county of Rutland in the East Midlands of England. The civil parish population was 256 at the 2001 census increasing to 269 at the 2011 census. It is located about four miles (6.4 km) south of Uppingham and about 4 miles north of Corby in Northamptonshire. The A6003 runs through the village; traffic flow on the bridge over the Eye Brook is controlled by traffic lights.

The village's name means 'cottages which are cold'.

Caldecott is the most southerly village in Rutland. It is a small historic ironstone village situated on the A6003. The village has campaigned for a bypass since at least the 1950s, which was approved in 2007 but was cancelled due to the 2008 financial crisis.

Otherwise Caldecott is surrounded by rolling countryside and close to the Eyebrook Reservoir nature reserve and Rockingham Forest. Caldecott has a new playground, fundraised for and managed by the local community. The village has an active community, hosting a number of clubs & societies and events, usually at the Village Hall. The parish church of St John the Evangelist, is a Grade II* listed building; it dates back to the 12th century and is a focal point for the village, holding regular services.

There is one public house - The Plough Inn - by The Green on Main Street, and an Italian restaurant - Castle Italia - on the A6003 Rockingham Road to the south of the village.

There was once a railway station on the southern edge of the village. It was named after the neighbouring village of Rockingham, which was considered to be of more importance at the time. The railway station closed in 1966.
