= St Peter's Church, Allexton =

Coordinates: 52.5953°N 0.7944°W

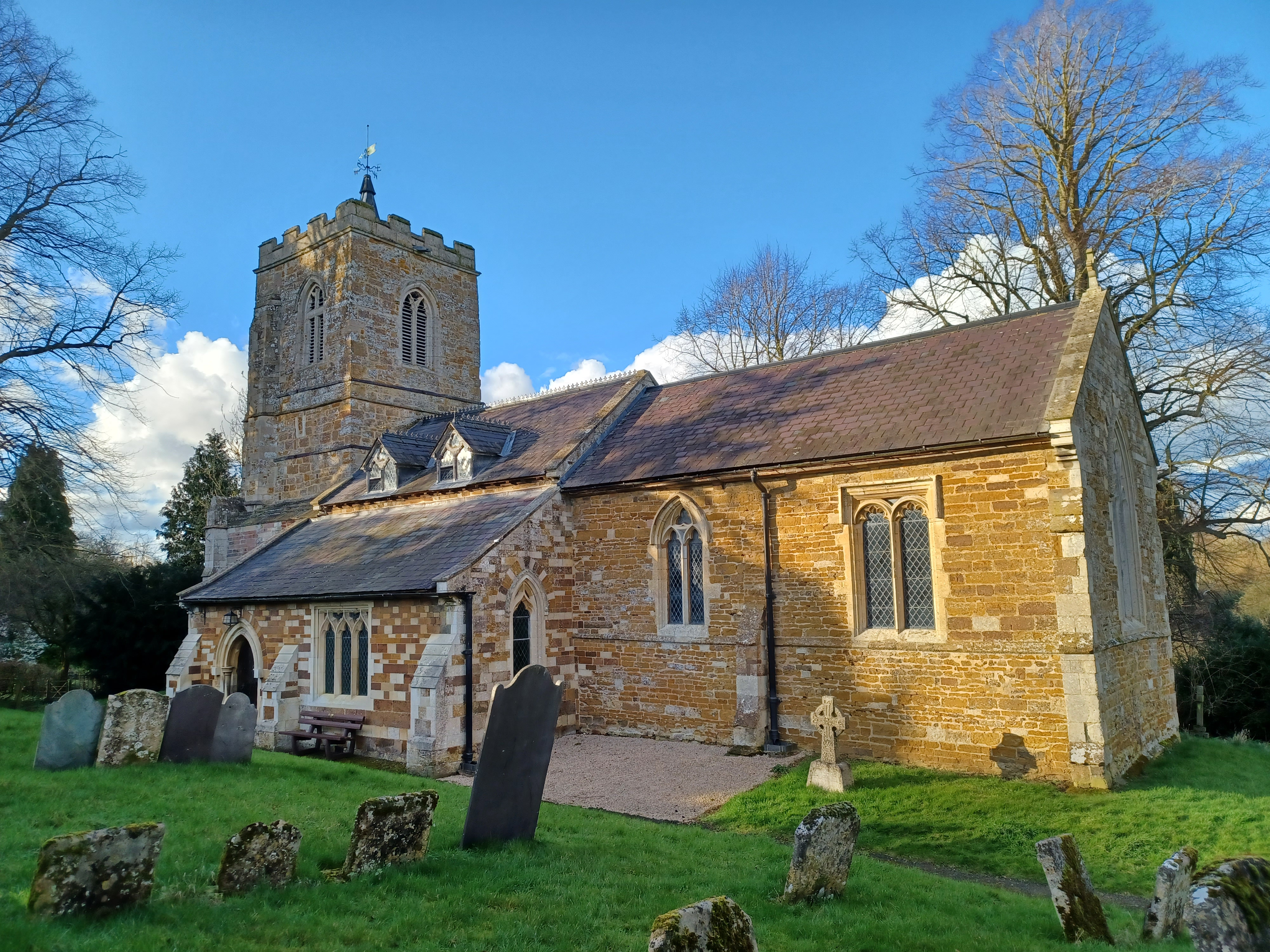
- St Peter's Church, Allexton, from the southeast

- Location in Leicestershire
- OS grid reference: SK 817 004
- Location: Allexton, Leicestershire
- Country: England
- Denomination: Anglican
- Website: Churches Conservation Trust

History
- Dedication: Saint Peter

Architecture
- Heritage designation: Grade II*
- Designated: 29 December 1966
- Architectural type: Church
- Style: Norman, Gothic
- Groundbreaking: 12th century
- Completed: 1863

Specifications
- Materials: Stone, Welsh slate roofs

St Peter's Church is a historic Anglican church in the village of Allexton, Leicestershire, England. It is recorded in the National Heritage List for England as a designated Grade II* listed building, and is under the care of the Churches Conservation Trust. Its most important feature is the Norman north arcade dating from about 1160.

== History ==
The earliest fabric in the church dates from about the middle of the 12th century. The tower was added in the 15th century. The aisles were demolished in the 16th century, but rebuilt in a restoration in 1862–63. As part of this restoration, the north arcade which had been suffering from decay, was repaired. The church was vested in the Churches Conservation Trust on 27 April 2000.

== Architecture ==
=== Exterior ===
The church is constructed in stone with Welsh slate roofs. Its plan consists of a nave with north and south aisles, a chancel with a north porch, and a west tower. The tower is in two stages with buttresses on the west side. A staircase projects from it to the south. In the lower stage is a west window, and on the south side is a blocked arch. The upper stage contains a two-light bell opening on each side. The top of the tower is battlemented, and it is surmounted by a low spirelet with a weathervane. The windows in the north aisle contain plate tracery. Both the north and south sides of the chancel have two-light windows, and the east window contains Decorated tracery. The south aisle contains a doorway and, to its right, a three-light window. In the roof above the south aisle are two two-light dormer windows. On each side of the doorway is a medieval statue of a lion.

=== Interior ===
The Norman north arcade has two bays with round piers. The arches are carved with a zigzag pattern. The south arcade is also in two bays with pointed arches carried on octagonal piers. The font dates from the 15th century. On the south wall of the chancel is a piscina. One of the windows in the north aisle contains some medieval stained glass. The stained glass in the east window dates from the 19th century. There is a ring of four bells. The oldest two were cast in 1597 and in 1640 by Watts, and the other two were cast in 1930 by John Taylor & Co of Loughborough.

== External features ==
In the churchyard is the table tomb of Thomas Hotchkin who died in 1774. It has balusters at the corners and on the top is an urn decorated with leaves and flowers and surmounted by a flame finial. It is listed Grade II. Hotchkin had been the owner of a sugar plantation.

== See also ==
- List of churches preserved by the Churches Conservation Trust in the English Midlands
- St Botolph's Church, Wardley, in neighbouring parish in Rutland, also in care of the CCT
