= The Olive Branch and Beech House =

Public house in Clipsham, Rutland, England

Coordinates: 52.7341°N 0.5645°W

- Interactive map of The Olive Branch and Beech House

Restaurant information
- Rating: (Michelin Guide 2008)
- Location: Clipsham near Stamford, Lincolnshire, England

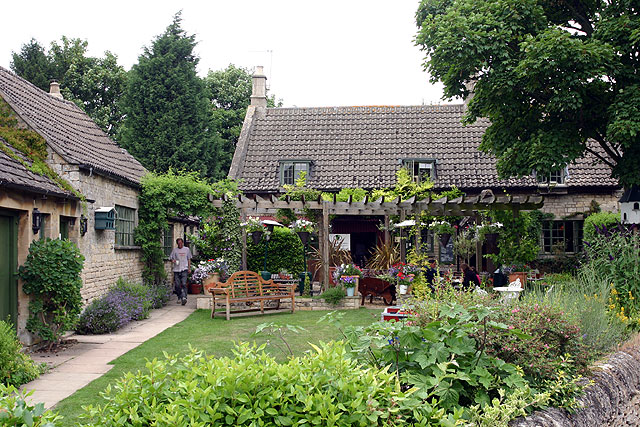
The Olive Branch

The Olive Branch is a public house and restaurant located in the Rutland village of Clipsham. Clipsham is close to the A1, near Stamford, Lincolnshire. As of 2008, the restaurant holds one star in the Michelin Guide.

Beech House, across the road from The Olive Branch, offers six luxury bedrooms and suites.

The Olive Branch was awarded the titles of Michelin Pub of the Year 2008 and The Good Pub Guide Inn of the Year 2008.
