= Lyndon, Rutland =

Village in Rutland, England

Coordinates: 52.630°N 0.658°W

Lyndon
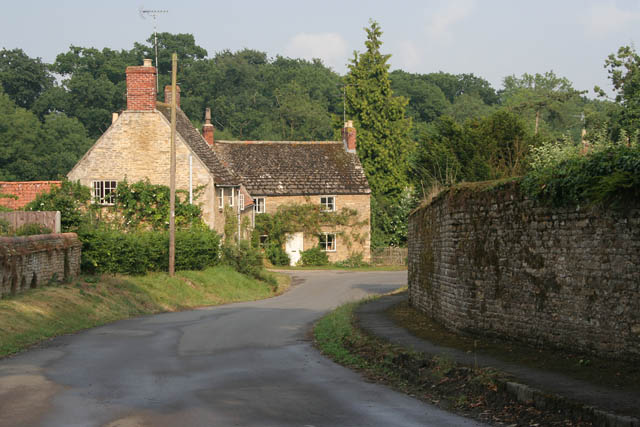
- Church Lane, Lyndon

- Location within Rutland
- Area: 1.42 sq mi (3.7 km^{2})
- Population: 80 2001 Census
  - Density: 56/sq mi (22/km^{2})
- OS grid reference: SK909044
  - London: 81 miles (130 km) SSE
- Unitary authority: Rutland
- Ceremonial county: Rutland
- Region: East Midlands
- Country: England
- Sovereign state: United Kingdom
- Post town: OAKHAM
- Postcode district: LE15
- Dialling code: 01572
- Police: Leicestershire
- Fire: Leicestershire
- Ambulance: East Midlands
- UK Parliament: Rutland and Stamford

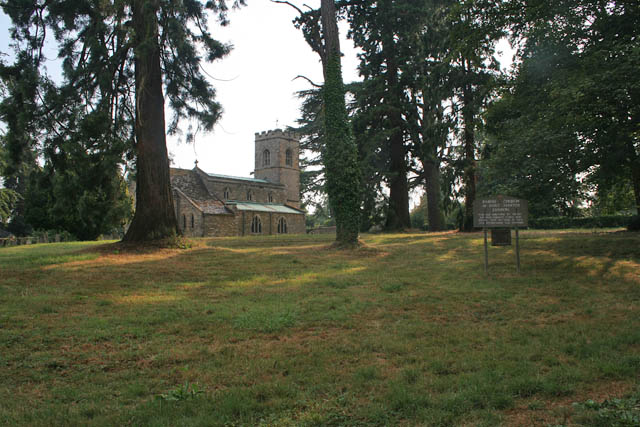
St Martin's Church, Lyndon

Lyndon is a small village in the county of Rutland in the East Midlands of England. The population of the civil parish was 80 at the 2001 census (including Pilton), increasing to 124 at the 2011 census.

The village's name means 'hill of flax' or 'hill of lime trees'.

There are three Grade II* listed buildings in the parish: the Church of St Martin, Lyndon Hall and Top Hall.

Thomas Barker (1722–1809) of Lyndon Hall kept a detailed weather record from 1736 to 1798. William Whiston (1667–1752), best known for his translation of Josephus, died at the Hall, the home of his son-in-law, Samuel Barker on 22 August 1752. The Hall is owned by the Conant family.
