= Eyebrook Reservoir =

Reservoir in Leicestershire and Rutland, England

Coordinates: 52°33′06″N 0°44′29″W

- Site of Special Scientific Interest
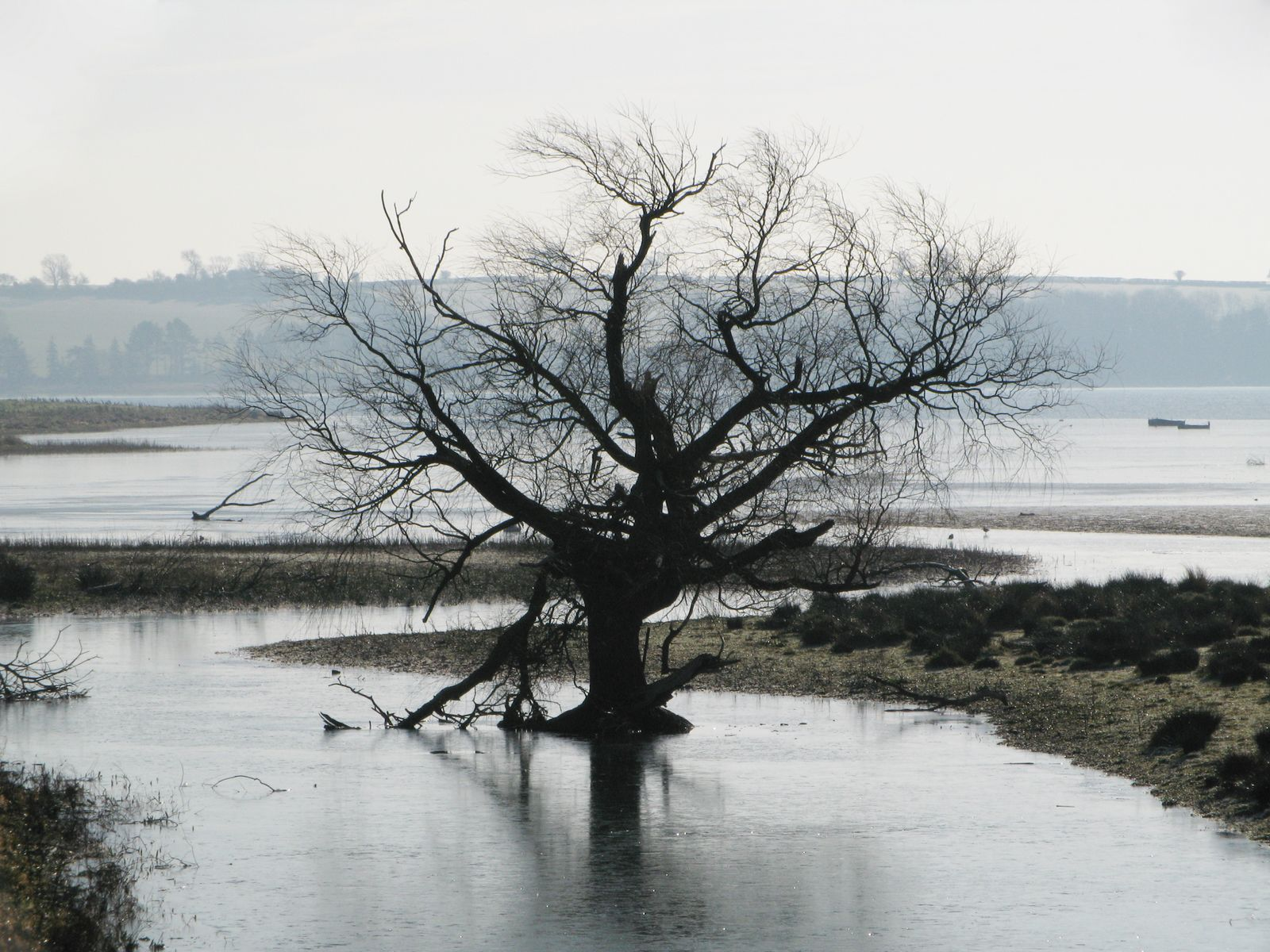
- Ice on the water in winter
- Location of Eyebrook Reservoir.
- Area of search: Leicestershire; Rutland
- Grid reference: SP 852 955
- Interest: Biological
- Area: 201.3 hectares
- Notification date: 01/07/1983
- Location map: Magic Map

Eyebrook Reservoir (or Eye Brook Reservoir) is a 201.3-hectare (497-acre) reservoir and biological Site of Special Scientific Interest which straddles the border between Leicestershire and Rutland in central England. The closest towns are Corby and Uppingham.

The reservoir was formed by the damming of the Eye Brook. It was built between 1937 and 1940 by Stewarts & Lloyds (supervised by Geoffrey Binnie of Binnie & Partners) to supply water to its Corby steel works, operated by subsidiary company Corby (Northants) and District Water Company. During the Second World War it was used in May 1943 as a practice site for the Dambuster raids, standing in for the Möhne Reservoir; a plaque commemorates this.

The reservoir is an important site for wintering wildfowl, such as wigeon, teal, mallard and pochard. Other habitats are marsh, mudflats, grassland, broad-leaved woodland and plantations. Other species reported from the reservoir include osprey, smew, dunlin and European golden plover. In passage periods scarcer species can be attracted to the reservoir's shores and these regularly include curlew sandpiper, ruff and spotted redshank among the expected waders. Vagrants which have occurred include seabirds such a Leach's petrel and Northern gannet, as well as squacco heron, black-crowned night heron American wigeon, black-winged pratincole, killdeer and a variety of other species, mostly associated with wetlands.

There is no public access to the reservoir, which is reserved for a trout fishery, but it can be viewed from a public footpath which runs along part of the eastern side.

Eyebrook Reservoir is a popular trout fishing venue. The reservoir is regularly stocked with triploid rainbow trout and is home to a native brown trout population. Fly fishing for pike also takes place at the reservoir.
