= Wardley, Rutland =

Village in Rutland, England

Coordinates: 52.595°N 0.776°W

Wardley
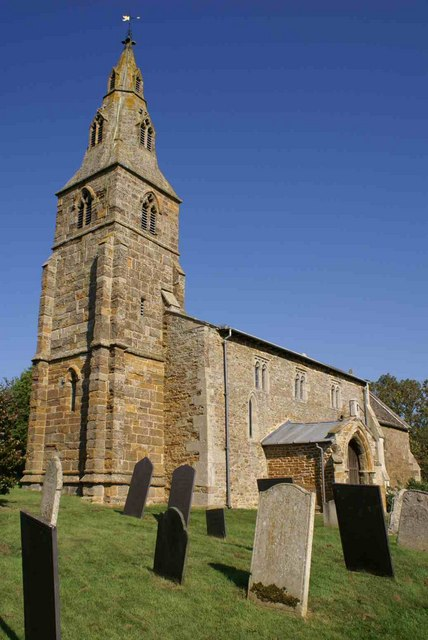
- St Botolph's Church, Wardley

- Location within Rutland
- Area: 1.17 sq mi (3.0 km^{2})
- Population: 32 2001 Census
  - Density: 27/sq mi (10/km^{2})
- OS grid reference: SK830003
  - London: 81 miles (130 km) SSE
- Unitary authority: Rutland
- Shire county: Rutland
- Ceremonial county: Rutland
- Region: East Midlands
- Country: England
- Sovereign state: United Kingdom
- Post town: OAKHAM
- Postcode district: LE15
- Dialling code: 01572
- Police: Leicestershire
- Fire: Leicestershire
- Ambulance: East Midlands
- UK Parliament: Rutland and Stamford

Wardley is a village and civil parish in the county of Rutland in the East Midlands of England. The population at the 2001 census was 32. At the 2011 census the population remained less than 100 and is included in the civil parish of Ridlington. It is located about two miles (3 km) west of Uppingham, close to the A47.

The village's name probably means 'wood/clearing with a weir' or 'wood/clearing of the watchmen'.

The manor is not mentioned in Domesday Book, but was probably among the unnamed wikt:berewicks attached to Ridlington. By the early 12th century it was in the hands of Richard Basset, who granted it to Launde Priory in Leicestershire with whom it remained until the Dissolution.

St Botolph's parish church is Grade II* listed. In 2016 the church passed into the care of the Churches Conservation Trust.

The two-mile (3 km) £1.9 million Wardley Hill Improvement for the A47 opened in October 1987 when the road through the village became a dead end.

The village has no mains water supply, instead water is supplied from a borehole.

Wardley Wood, owned by the Forestry Commission, is an ancient woodland on a hillside.
