= St Mary's Church, Manton =

Church in Manton, Rutland

Coordinates: 52°37′58″N 0°42′00″W

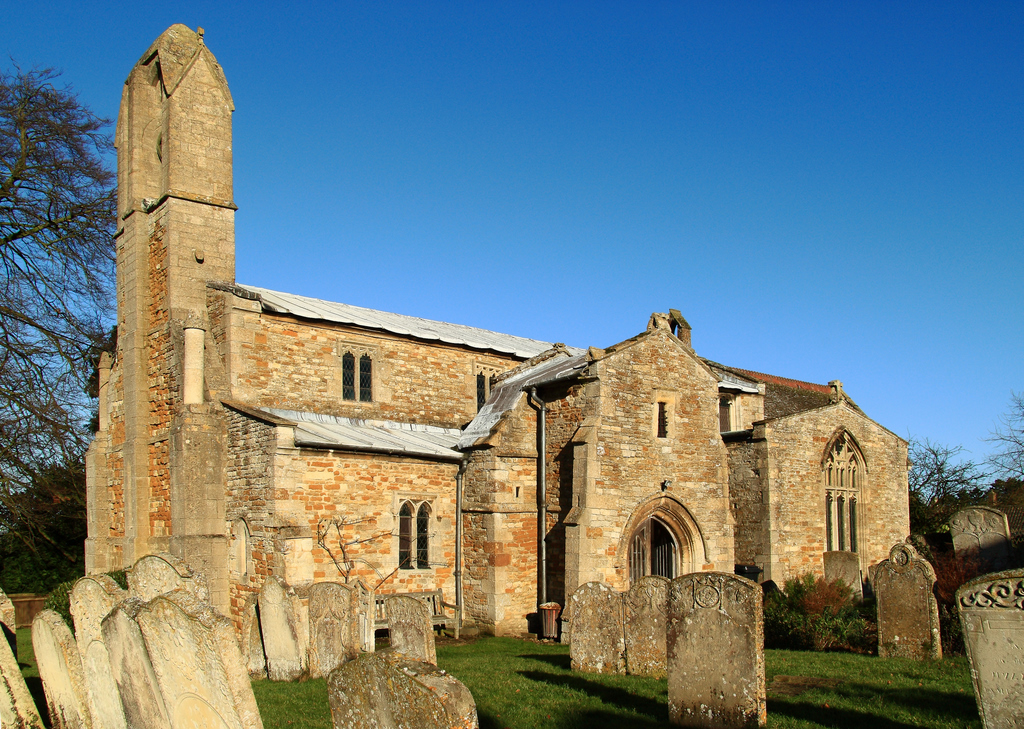
- Denomination: Church of England

History
- Dedication: St Mary

Administration
- Diocese: Peterborough
- Parish: Manton, Rutland

St Mary's Church is a church in Manton, Rutland. It is a Grade II* listed building.

== History ==
The church dates from the 12th century and doesn't have a tower. The 14th-century south porch has a parvise not connected to the body of the church. It also has two scratch dials. There is a double bell-cote on top of the 13th-century west front.

The nave is Norman and has a clerestory built in the 14th century. A poorbox dating from 1637 is near the bell-shaped font.

A royal coat of arms to George III dating from c1796 is situated above the chancel arch, which dates from the 13th century. It was probably added during the rebuilding of the chancel that year.

Sir William Wade, who has a plaque near the pulpit, is buried in the north transept. Wade was the founder of a three-chaplain college which the church housed in 1356.
