= Church of St John the Evangelist, Caldecott =

Church in Rutland, England

Coordinates: 52°32′03″N 0°43′16″W

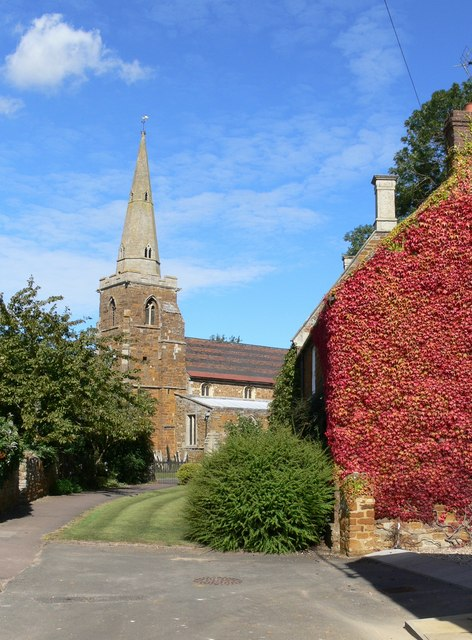
- Denomination: Church of England

History
- Dedication: St John the Evangelist

Administration
- Diocese: Peterborough
- Archdeaconry: Rutland
- Parish: Caldecott, Rutland

Clergy
- Vicar(s): Jane Baxter

The Church of St John the Evangelist is the Church of England parish church in Caldecott, Rutland. It is a Grade II* listed building.

== History ==
The church is in the 13th-century Gothic style. The clerestory was built in the 15th century and in 1684 the porch was built.

A part of the spire can be found to the left of the porch. The spire was struck by lightning in 1797. The church has a royal coat of arms to Queen Victoria over the chancel. The chancel also has a pair of sedilia.

In the churchyard, to the west of the tower, there is an area with ten table tombs.

Also in the churchyard the grave of Launcelot Packer is marked by a cross. He was a son of the vicar who had emigrated to Cleveland Heights, Ohio. He wanted to be buried in Caldecott with his parents. When he died in 1937 his body was embalmed, placed in a copper coffin, costing £400, and sent to England. He lay in the church so villagers could see him the night before he was buried.
