= Clipsham =

Village in Rutland, England

Coordinates: 52.736°N 0.566°W

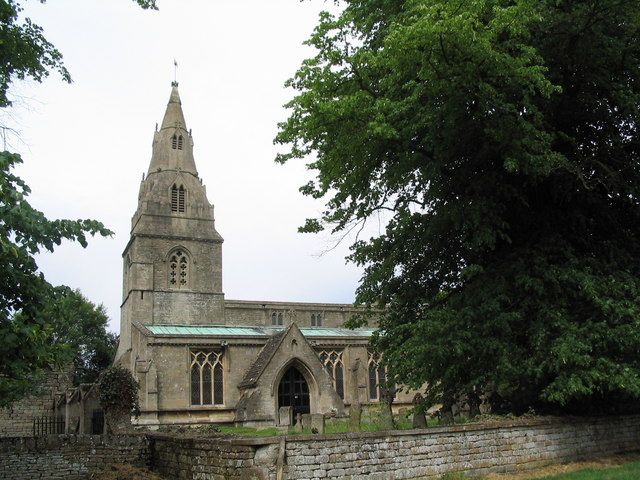
- St Mary's Church, Clipsham

- Location within Rutland
- Area: 2.61 sq mi (6.8 km^{2})
- Population: 120 (2001 Census)
  - Density: 46/sq mi (18/km^{2})
- OS grid reference: SK969163
  - London: 88 miles (142 km) SSE
- Unitary authority: Rutland
- Ceremonial county: Rutland
- Region: East Midlands
- Country: England
- Sovereign state: United Kingdom
- Post town: OAKHAM
- Postcode district: LE15
- Dialling code: 01572
- Police: Leicestershire
- Fire: Leicestershire
- Ambulance: East Midlands
- UK Parliament: Rutland and Stamford

Clipsham is a small village in the county of Rutland in the East Midlands of England. It is in the northeast of Rutland, close to the county boundary with Lincolnshire. The population of the civil parish was 120 at the 2001 census increasing to 166 at the 2011 census.

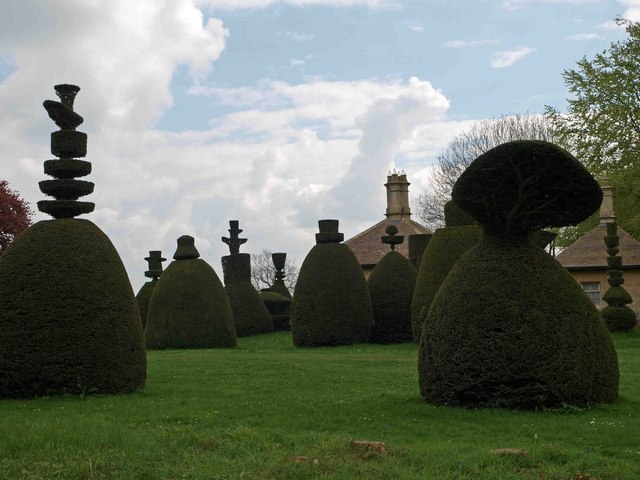
Topiary at Clipsham Yew Tree Avenue

The village's name possibly means 'homestead/village of Cylp' or 'hemmed-in land of Cylp'.

St Mary's Church is a Grade II* listed building. Clipsham Hall of c. 1700 is a Grade II* listed mansion, set in a landscaped park.

The Olive Branch is one of the very few pubs to hold a Michelin star and in 2008 was chosen as winner of the Michelin Pub of the Year.

The village is well known for its limestone quarries. Clipsham stone, part of the Upper Lincolnshire Limestone Formation, can be found in many of Britain's most famous buildings including King's College Chapel (Cambridge), the Examination Schools in Oxford, York Minster, and in repairs to the Houses of Parliament. The earliest recorded use of Clipsham stone was for Windsor Castle between 1363 and 1368. The London Stone is made of it, however, and dates back at least to about 1100.

== Yew Tree Avenue ==
The topiary Yew Tree Avenue, once the carriage drive to Clipsham Hall, has been maintained by the Forestry Commission. The avenue stretches for 500 metres (1,600 ft), with some 150 shaped yew trees leading towards the Hall. Many of the trees are over 200 years old and have been trimmed since the late 19th-century into various shapes depicting birds and animals on the tops and designs in relief on the sides.

After 2010, Forest Enterprise could not fund the annual trimming and the trees became overgrown and diseased. The Clipsham Yew Tree Avenue Trust, a registered charity set up in 2018, has signed a 20-year agreement with the Forestry Commission to take over the management of the avenue. In 2024 the trust was awarded a grant of £114,650 in 2024 to preserve the trees and restore lost topiary designs.

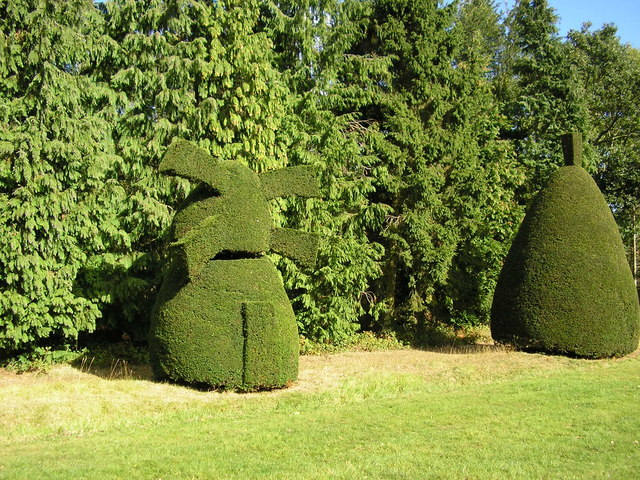
A topiary windmill

== See also ==
- Clipsham Old Quarry and Pickworth Great Wood
- List of types of limestone
