= St Mary's Church, Clipsham =

Church in Clipsham, Rutland

Coordinates: 52°44′10″N 0°33′52″W

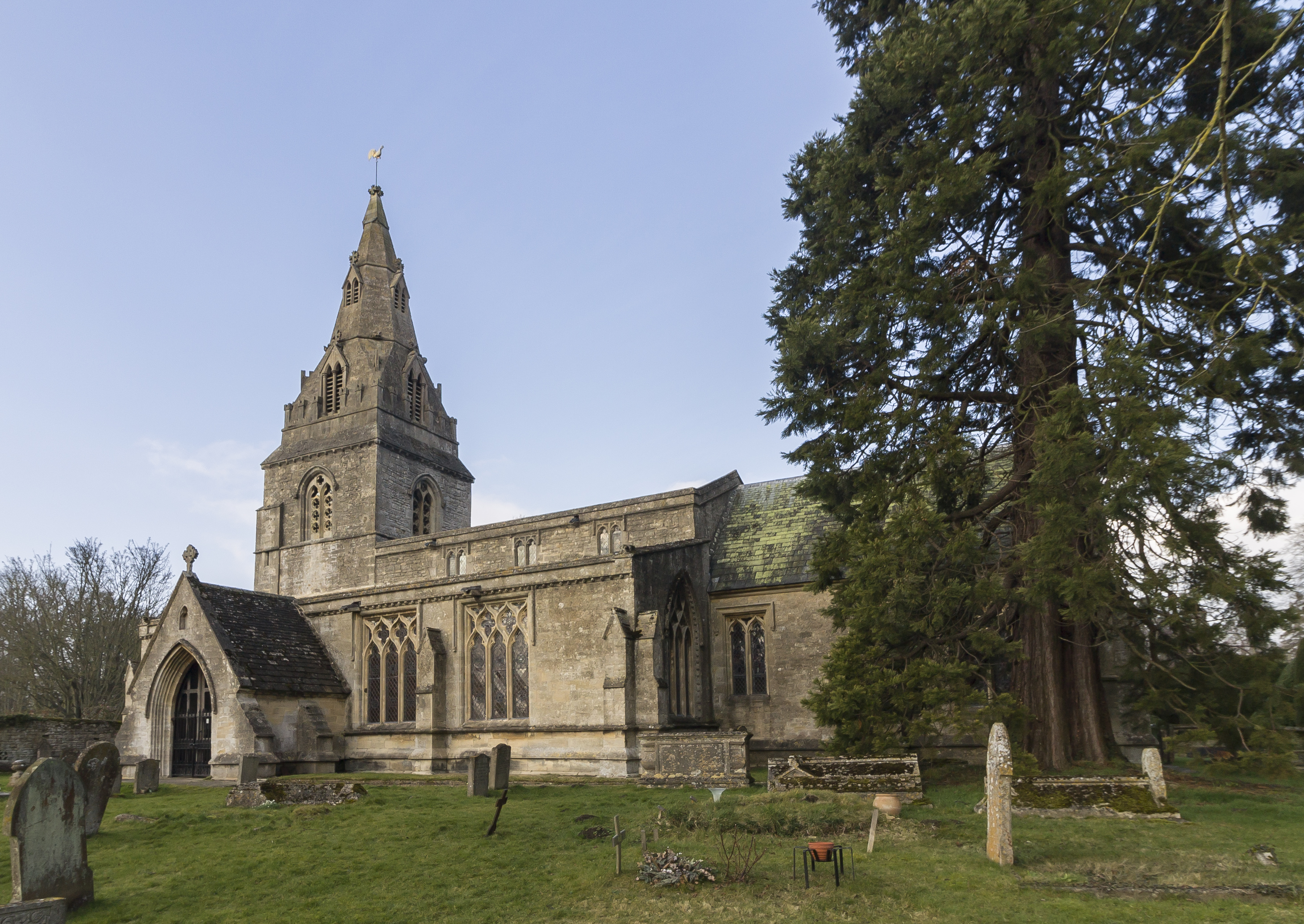
- Denomination: Church of England

History
- Dedication: St Mary

Administration
- Diocese: Peterborough
- Parish: Clipsham, Rutland

St Mary's Church is a Church of England parish church in Clipsham, Rutland. It is a Grade II* listed building.

== History ==
The church dates back to the 12th century. The tower, which has a spire and consists of three stages, was built c1300. The roof is pyramid-shaped and has turrets.

There are northern and southern arcades, dating from Norman era and c1200, by the nave. The church also has a piscina, a Norman font and clerestory. In the northern chancel there is a chapel whose roof dates from the 19th century. In 1858 the church was restored.

The church has a pulpit, oak pews, a lectern and reredos dating back to c1860.

The eastern window in the chapel has some 15th-century glass with pictures of medieval birds and coats of arms.
