= Preston, Rutland =

Village in Rutland, England

Coordinates: 52.613°N 0.715°W

Preston
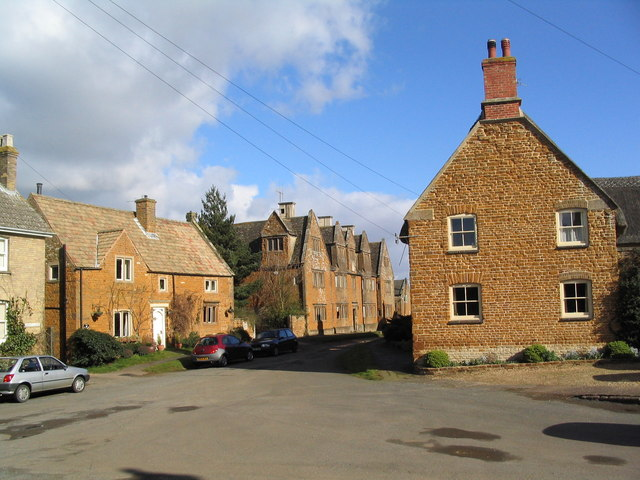

- Location within Rutland
- Area: 1.89 sq mi (4.9 km^{2})
- Population: 200 2001 Census
  - Density: 95/sq mi (37/km^{2})
- OS grid reference: SK871024
  - London: 81 miles (130 km) SSE
- Unitary authority: Rutland
- Shire county: Rutland
- Ceremonial county: Rutland
- Region: East Midlands
- Country: England
- Sovereign state: United Kingdom
- Post town: OAKHAM
- Postcode district: LE15
- Dialling code: 01572
- Police: Leicestershire
- Fire: Leicestershire
- Ambulance: East Midlands
- UK Parliament: Rutland and Stamford

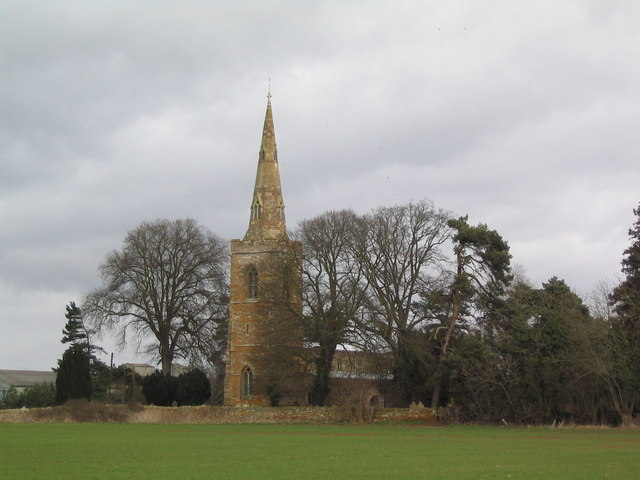
Church of St Peter and St Paul, Preston

Preston is a village and civil parish in the county of Rutland in the East Midlands of England. It lies north of Uppingham on the A6003 to Oakham. The population at the 2001 census was 179 falling slightly to 173 at the 2011 census and then rising to 200 in the 2021 census.

The village's name means 'farm/settlement of the priests'.

The Church of St Peter and St Paul, Preston is a Grade II* listed building.
