= St Peter's Church, Belton-in-Rutland =

Church in Belton-in-Rutland, Rutland

Coordinates: 52°36′14″N 0°47′46″W

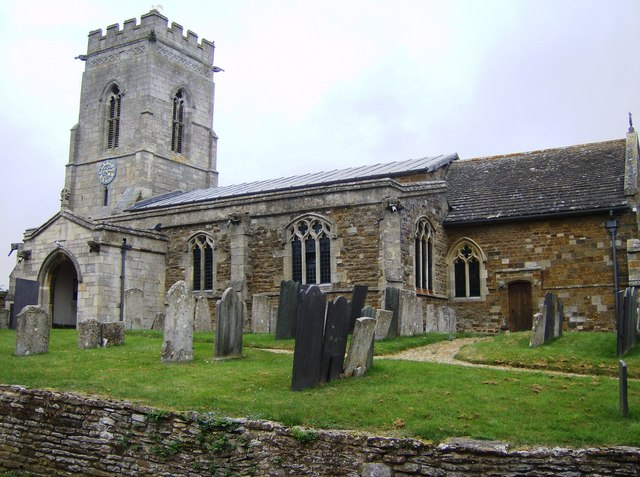
- Denomination: Church of England

History
- Dedication: St Peter

Administration
- Diocese: Peterborough
- Parish: Belton-in-Rutland, Rutland

Clergy
- Vicar(s): Rachel Watts

St Peter's Church is a Church of England parish church in Belton-in-Rutland, Rutland. It is a Grade II* listed building.

== History ==
The south arcade, dating from the early thirteenth century, is the oldest part of the church along with the stonework in the lower part of the nave walls. There could have been a north aisle but, according to local tradition, this was burnt in the 14th century. The pillars are still slightly reddish from the flames. The church also caught fire in 1776 when a servant girl threw hot coals out a window. It was extinguished as it reached the church.

The piscina in the south aisle has a bowl carved with a head with donkey ears.

The south porch dates from the 16th century. The west tower, which has a frieze situated below the battlements decorated with gargoyles, was added in the 14th century.

There are some stone effigies built into the stone wall between the church and the road.
