= St Peter's Church, Barrowden =

Church in Barrowden, Rutland, England

Coordinates: 52.5888°N 0.6067°W

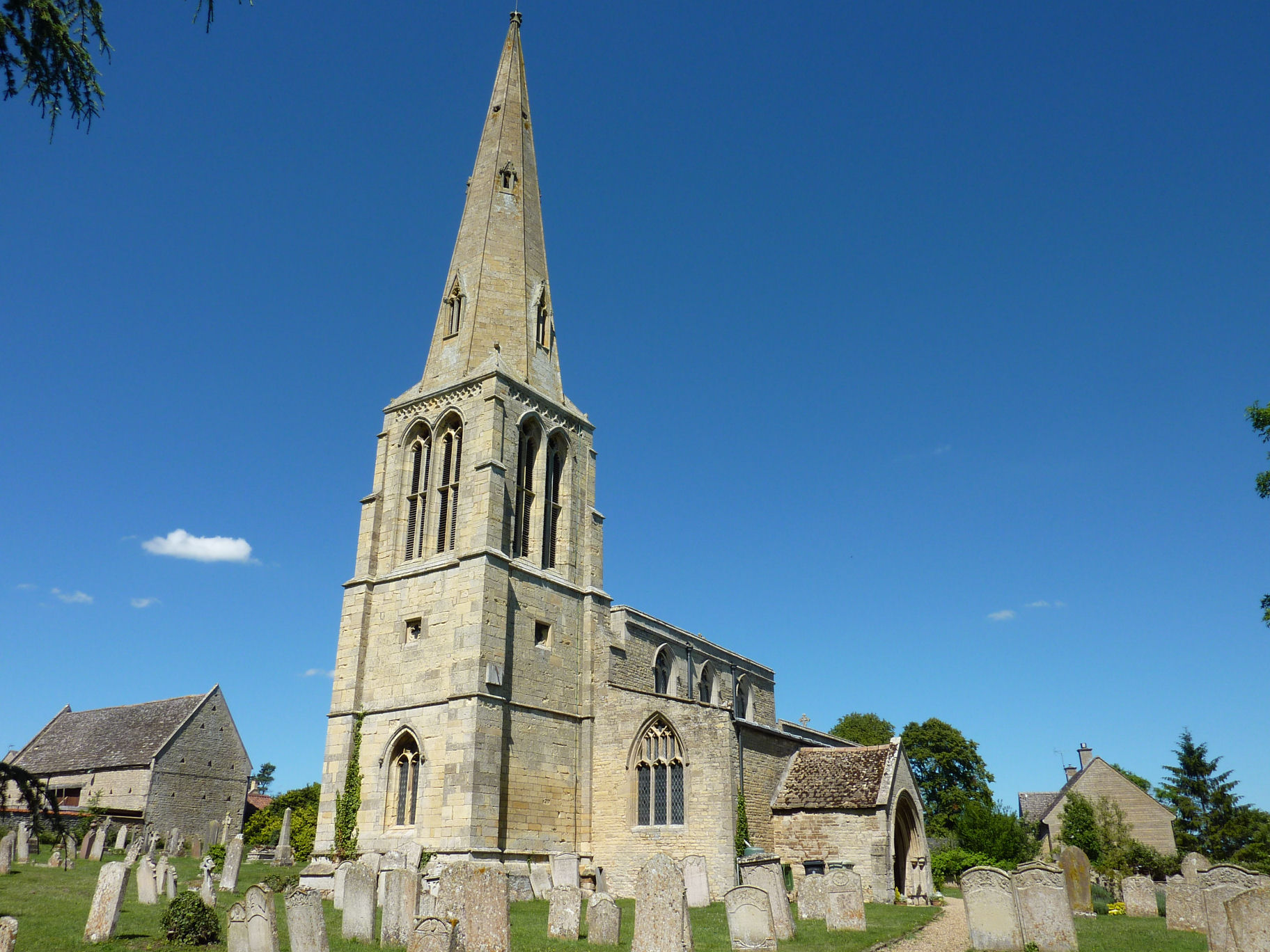
- Denomination: Church of England
- Website: https://wellandfosse.org/

History
- Dedication: St Peter

Administration
- Diocese: Peterborough
- Parish: Barrowden, Rutland

Clergy
- Vicar(s): Rev Stephen Gamble

St Peter's Church is a Church of England parish church in Barrowden, Rutland. It is a Grade II* listed building.

== History ==
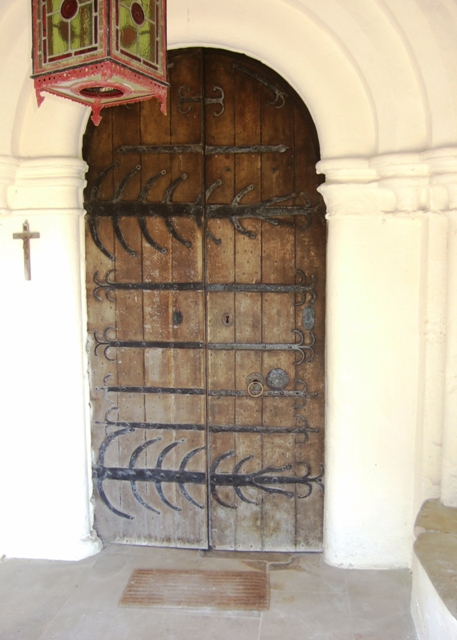
Southern porch

Parts of the church date back to c1210. In the 13th century the northern and southern aisles were built and in the 14th century the western tower. There is a modern southern door, a Norman Romanesque doorway and 12th century ironwork. The font is an octagonal design. The roof of the chancel has six medieval, wooden angels.

There are some nave arcades built in the 13th century. Courtesy of a rector, there is a bench end situated in the chancel which has been dated to 1631. In the 19th century it was made into a prayer desk. A section of the pulpit, built 1605, has been made into a bookcase.

There is a freestone memorial to Rowland Durant on the northern wall of the northern aisle.

The church is dedicated to St Peter. In an ancient tradition, rushes or hay are laid on the floors of nave and porch for St Peter's Day (29 June).

Thomas Cook married Marianne Mason in the church in 1833.
