= St Martin's Church, Lyndon =

Church in Lyndon, Rutland

Coordinates: 52°37′48″N 0°39′39″W

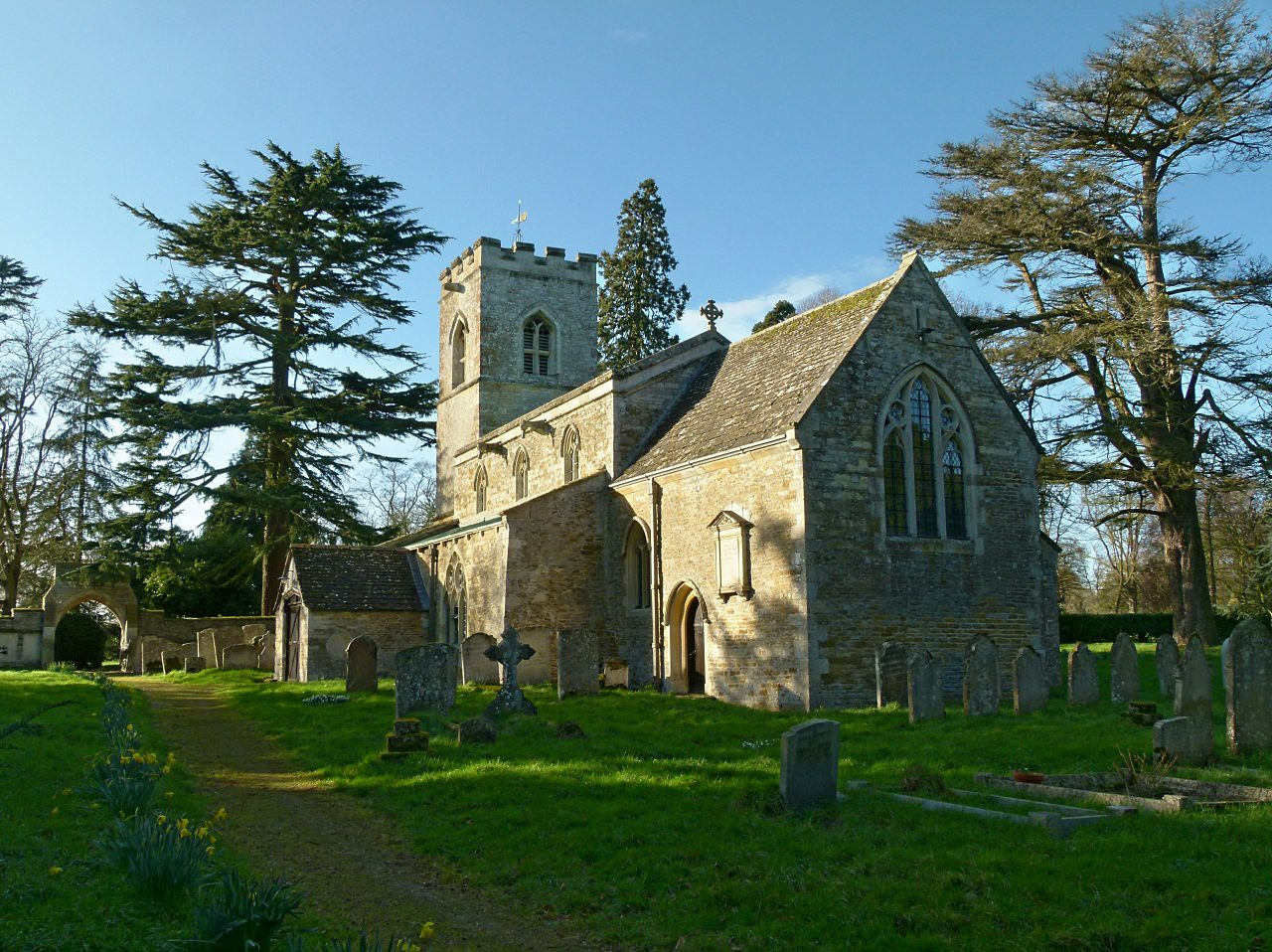
- Denomination: Church of England

History
- Dedication: Martin of Tours

Administration
- Diocese: Peterborough
- Parish: Lyndon, Rutland

St Martin's Church is the Church of England parish church in Lyndon, Rutland. It is a Grade II* listed building.

== History ==
Most of the church is 13th and 14th century. The tower dates to the 14th century, but the upper section was rebuilt the next century. Outside the porch door is a scratch dial. The south door dates to the 13th century.

On the ledge of the west window of the south aisle is an old cross head of an unknown date and purpose. It is thought to be what is left of a cross at the village crossroads or to have been part of a cross above the chancel arch.

The font was found in the churchyard in 1865 and is 12th century. It has a square bowl carved with scrollwork and animals.

== Rectors ==
- Thomas Hutchinson
- Thomas Kerchever Arnold
- Lionel Cox
