= Tixover =

Village in Rutland, England

Coordinates: 52.592°N 0.561°W

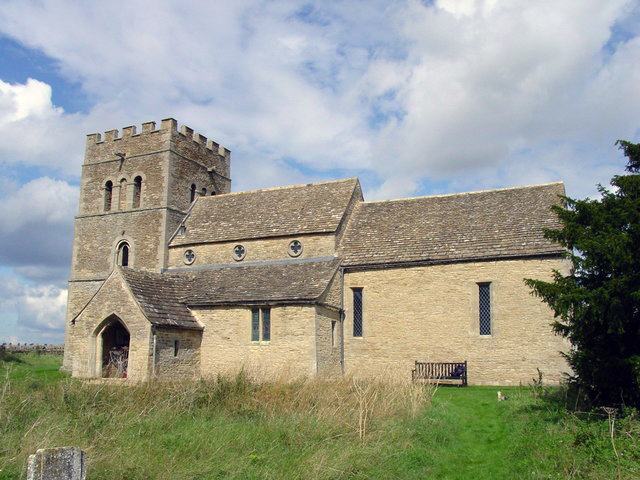
- St Luke's Church, Tixover

- Location within Rutland
- Area: 1.32 sq mi (3.4 km^{2})
- Population: 174 2001 Census
  - Density: 132/sq mi (51/km^{2})
- OS grid reference: SK975003
  - London: 79 miles (127 km) SSE
- Unitary authority: Rutland
- Shire county: Rutland
- Ceremonial county: Rutland
- Region: East Midlands
- Country: England
- Sovereign state: United Kingdom
- Post town: STAMFORD
- Postcode district: PE9
- Dialling code: 01780
- Police: Leicestershire
- Fire: Leicestershire
- Ambulance: East Midlands
- UK Parliament: Rutland and Stamford

Tixover is a small village and civil parish in Rutland. The population of the civil parish at the 2001 census was 174, falling to 163 at the 2011 census.

The village's name means 'ridge with young goats'. The second element derives from either the Old English 'ofer' and 'ora', which both mean ridge.

The parish is on the River Welland which is the county boundary with Northamptonshire. Most of the houses in the parish are east of the A47 road. St Luke's Church, near the River Welland, now stands about 3/4 mile from the village. The church is a Grade II* listed building.

Tixover Grange, west of the A47, was home to the residential school named after Wilfred Pickles from 1955 to the 1980s. Tixover House is now a care home, run by Barchester Healthcare.

Tixover Quarry is a popular off-road driving centre, which is used by Land Rover Owner Magazine for vehicle tests and photo shoots.
