= St Luke's Church, Tixover =

Church in Tixover, Rutland

Coordinates: 52°35′14″N 0°34′07″W

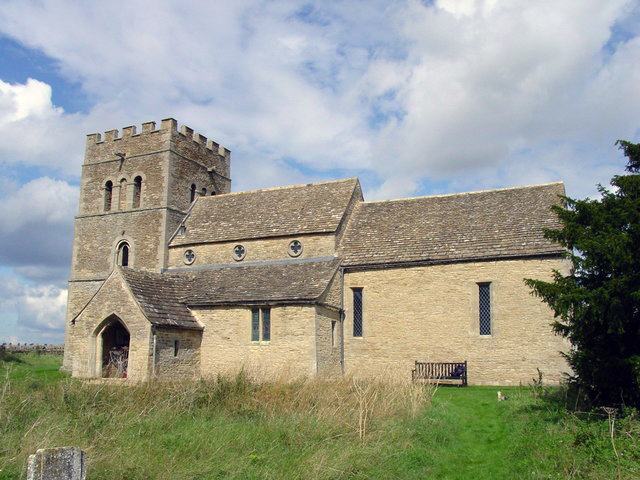
- Denomination: Church of England

History
- Dedication: St Luke

Administration
- Diocese: Peterborough
- Parish: Tixover, Rutland

Clergy
- Rector: Rev Stephen Gamble

St Luke's Church (Note: Some sources suggest that the dedication is to Mary Magdalene; Pevsner (1960) has "St Mary Magdalen" and NHLE list it as "Church of St. Luke/St. Mary Magdalen (formerly listed as Church of St Luke)") is a church in Tixover, Rutland. It is a Grade II* listed building. The church is close to the River Welland, now about 3/4 mile from the village of Tixover.

== History ==
The church consists of a nave, north and south aisles, chancel and tower. The tower dates from the early 12th century and has a bell inscribed Sancta Fides Ora Pro Nobis, (Latin for “Holy Faith, pray for us”).

The nave and chancel are 13th century and the nave is unusually shorter than the chancel. It has slit windows of an unknown date, thought to be either 13th century or perhaps the Tudor period.

The 13th-century north doorway is blocked and has a pointed arch. The north aisle roof is higher than the south aisle because the clerestory on the south side has three Victorian quatrefoil openings. The south porch dates to the 13th century. The pews have poppy head ends, the font dates to the 13th century and the pulpit, which is of Caen stone, dates to 1864.

The original stone seats run along the chancel wall. At the southern end is the Dale monument, erected by Margaret Dale, the third wife of Roger Dale (d. 1623), in commemoration of him. It shows Margaret and Roger kneeling at each end of a prayer desk with their kneeling daughters at the base. All their hands are missing, as is the head of one of the daughters.
