= Samuel Barker (Hebraist) =

English Hebraist

Samuel Barker (1686–1759) was an English Hebraist.

== Life ==
Barker was the son of Augustin Barker of South Luffenham and Thomasyn Tryst of Maidford, Northants, and inherited the Lordship of the Manor of Lyndon, Rutland by the bequest of his father's second cousin Sir Thomas Barker, 2nd Bt of Lyndon (1648-1706/7). Sir Thomas was a member of the 'Order of Little Bedlam' or Bedlam Club based at Burghley House. Samuel entered Wadham College, University of Oxford in June 1704 and graduated B.A. on 13 February 1707/8.

In 1717 Samuel married Sarah, only daughter of William Whiston, in whose memoirs he is mentioned. Their interests coincided closely, 'Wicked' Will Whiston being the translator-editor of Josephus. Whiston in later life resided with Samuel at Lyndon Hall and died there. Samuel was the father of Thomas Barker (1722–1809), called 'The father of meteorology', and was therefore the father-in-law of Ann Barker née White, the sister of Gilbert White of Selborne. Gilbert White maintained correspondence with Samuel Barker junr. (grandson of Samuel), who like his great-grandfather Whiston attended Clare College, University of Cambridge.

== Works ==
He wrote (in Latin) several learned tracts, which were collected and published (1761) in one quarto volume after his death, together with a Hebrew grammar, on which he had long been engaged. John Nichols said of it, 'This was a juvenile production – the produce of the ingenious Author's leisure hours.' It contained:

- Ancient Hebrew Poesy Restored
- On the Anacreontic songs
- On Greek accents
- Ancient Ionic writings
- On consonant and vowel letters
- On the pronunciation of the Hebrew language

He was the author of a letter, dated 7 November 1723, to Joseph Wasse, rector of Aynho, Northamptonshire, concerning a passage in the Sigeion inscription, which may be found in the Biblioteca Literaria of Samuel Jebb and William Bowyer, No. 10 (1724).
