= Church of St Peter and St Paul, Preston =

Church in Preston, Rutland

Coordinates: 52°36′44″N 0°42′59″W

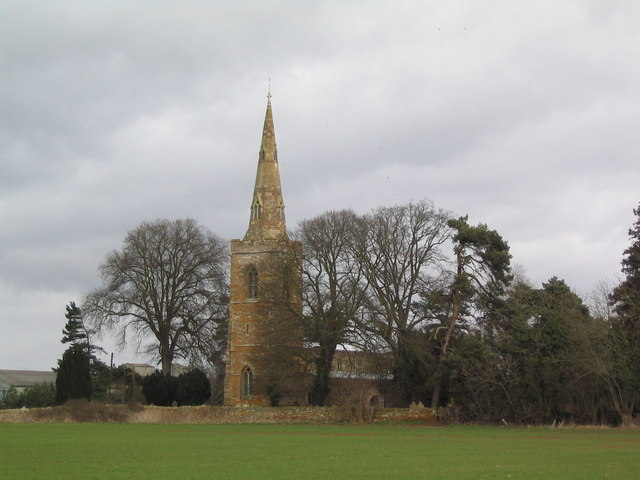
- Denomination: Church of England

History
- Dedication: St Peter, St Paul

Administration
- Diocese: Peterborough
- Parish: Preston, Rutland

Clergy
- Rector: Rachel Watts

The Church of St Peter and St Paul is a church in Preston, Rutland. It is a Grade II* listed building.

== History ==
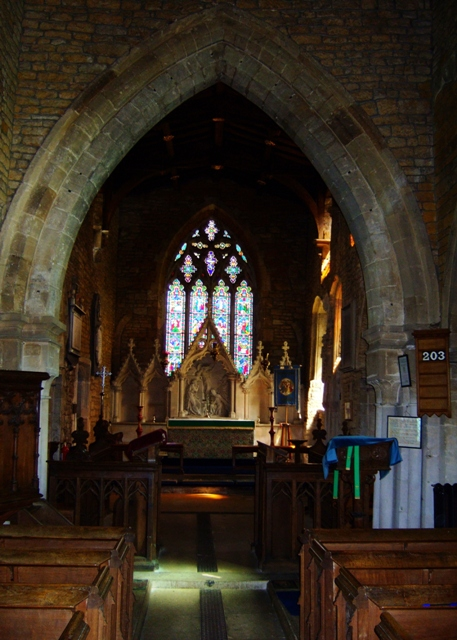
Interior looking east to the chancel arch, chancel and stone reredos

The church has a vestry, tower, north and south aisles, nave and a chancel. The bay of the north aisle dates back to c1150 and the south from c1200. The tower dates to the 13th century and a century later, remodelling took place. The font, a plain bowl on four cylindrical legs, dates to the 13th century.

The chancel dates to the 13th century; the sedile has a ogee-headed arch. The stone reredos, the design of Edward Browning, incorporates a marble relief by Mario Raggi; it was placed in the chancel in 1881 in memory of former rector, William Belgrave. The stained glass in the east window is by Alfred Gérente (1856).

The chancel has some lamps which came from the Street called Straight in Damascus, and it has a carved Roman stone. Lt. Col. J. A. Codrington presented these Middle Eastern items to the church in 1923. Two mosaic pieces from the Church of St John the Baptist, Constantinople and a piece of Verde Antique from St Sophia's Church in Nicaea (İznik), are just some of the items he donated. The cypress trees outside the church, were grown from seeds collected from the Garden of Gethsemane.
