= Barrowden =

Village in Rutland, England

Coordinates: 52.590°N 0.604°W

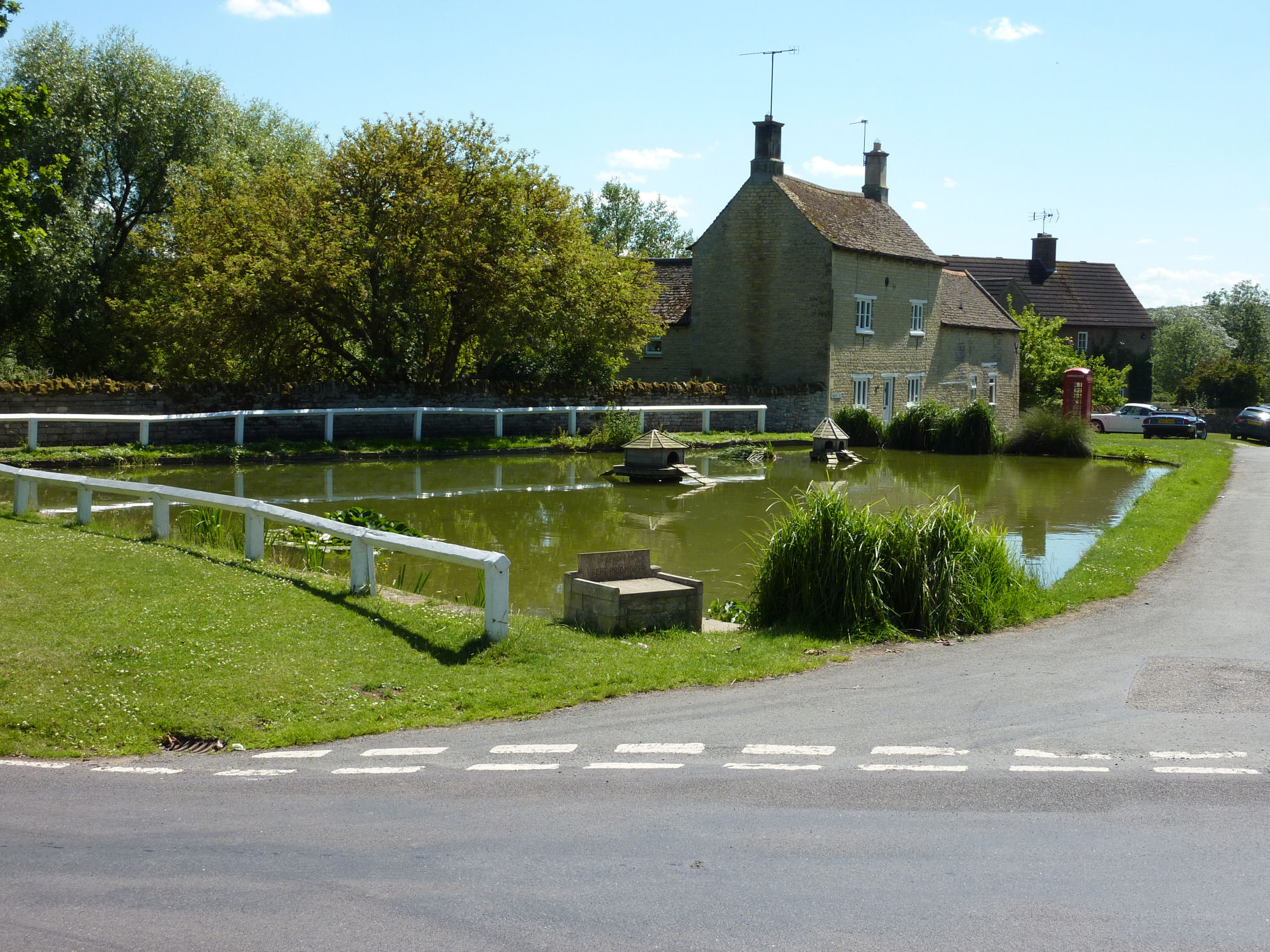
- The Duck Pond, Barrowden

- Location within Rutland
- Area: 3.24 sq mi (8.4 km^{2})
- Population: 420 2001 Census
  - Density: 130/sq mi (50/km^{2})
- OS grid reference: SK946000
  - London: 78 miles (126 km) SSE
- Unitary authority: Rutland
- Shire county: Rutland
- Ceremonial county: Rutland
- Region: East Midlands
- Country: England
- Sovereign state: United Kingdom
- Post town: OAKHAM
- Postcode district: LE15
- Dialling code: 01572
- Police: Leicestershire
- Fire: Leicestershire
- Ambulance: East Midlands
- UK Parliament: Rutland and Stamford

Barrowden is a village in Rutland in the East Midlands of England.

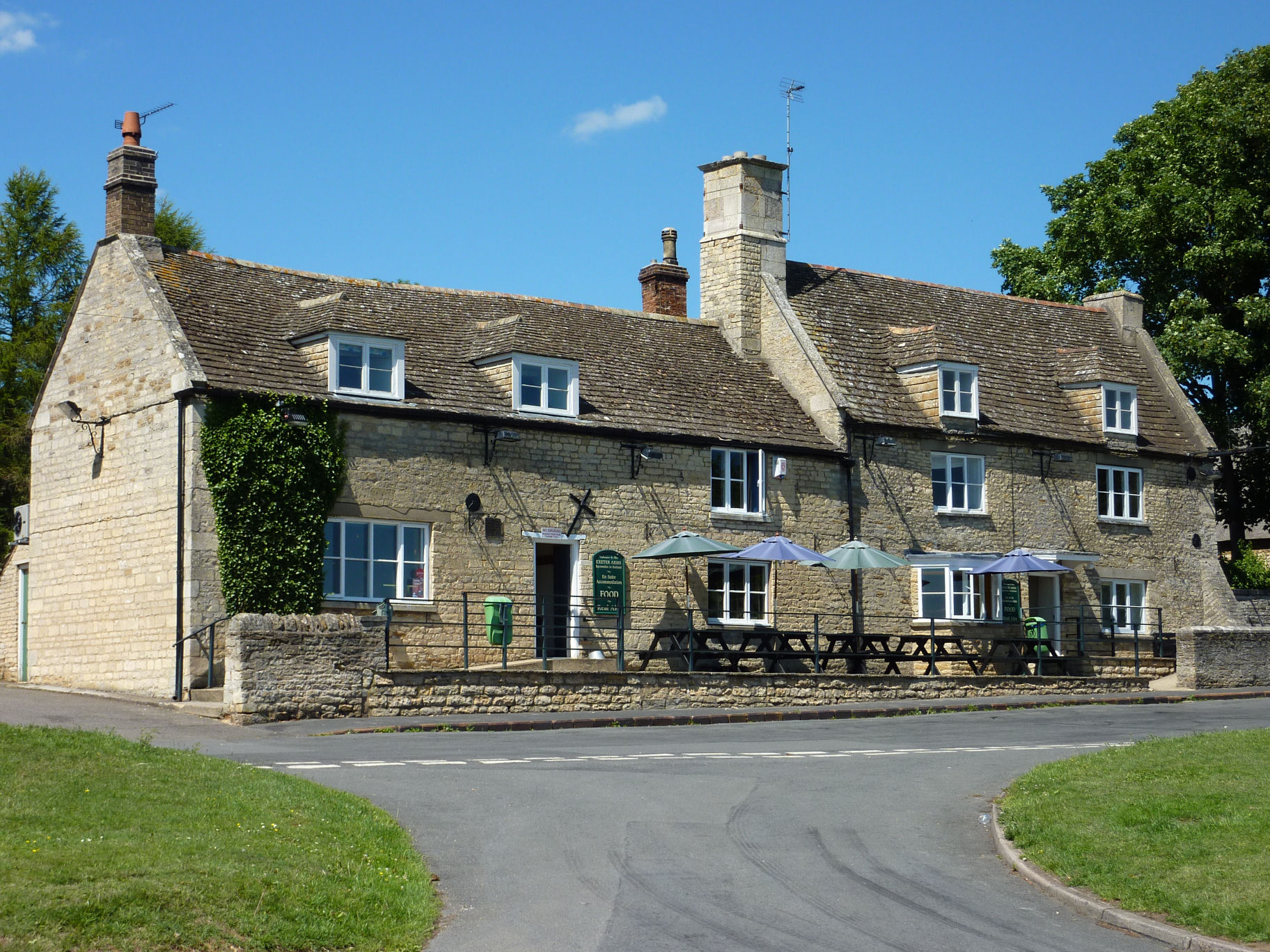
The Exeter Arms

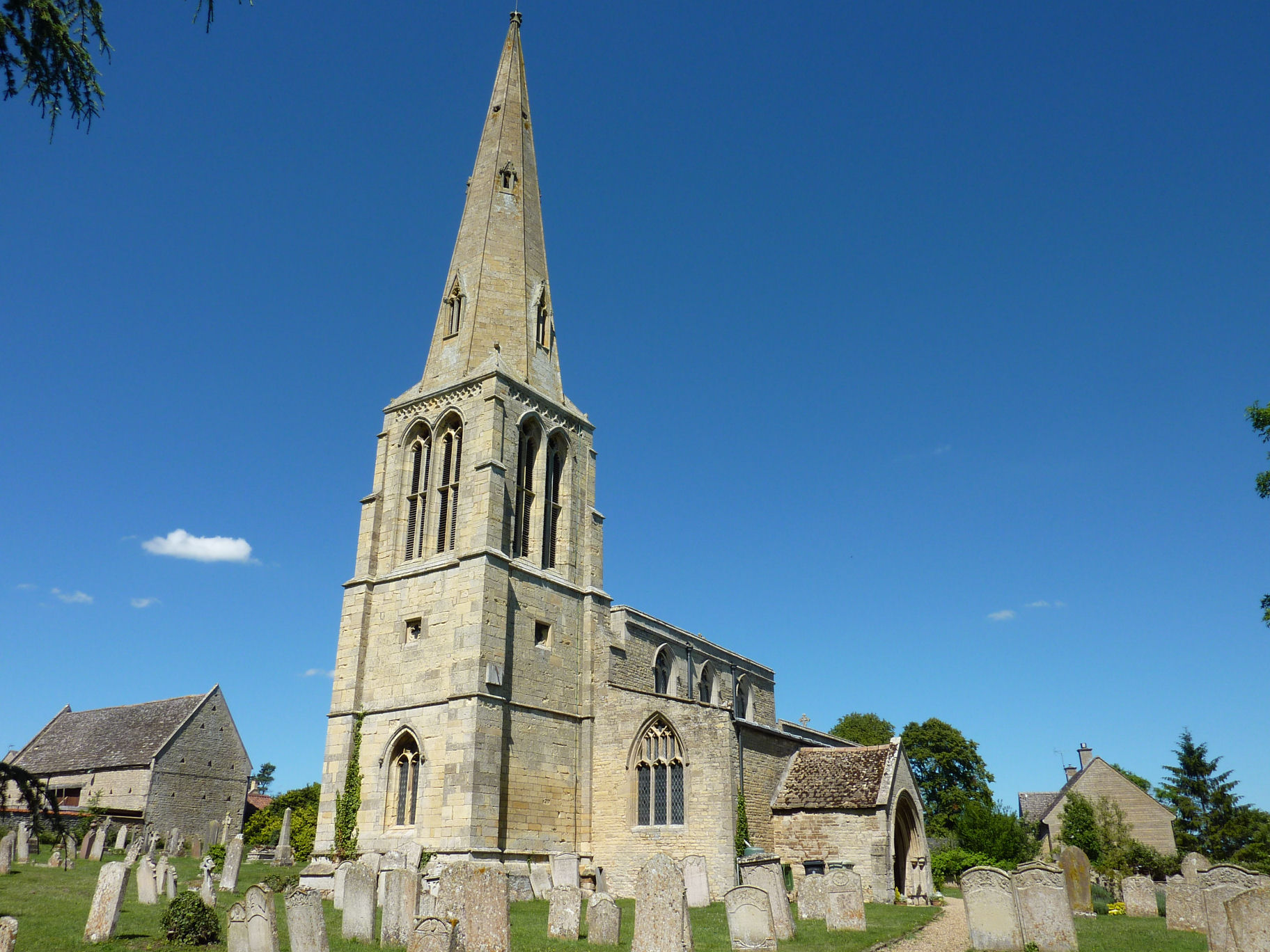
St Peter's Church

The village's name means 'burial-mound hill'. There are a number of barrows in the area.

The population of the civil parish was 506 at the 2011 census. There is a church, a village hall, a doctor's surgery and pharmacy, a community shop, a mobile library, a recreational field with cricket club and a pub, The Exeter Arms.

St Peter's Church, Barrowden is a Grade II* listed building. In an ancient tradition, rushes or hay are laid on the floors of nave and porch for St Peter's Day (29 June). Marianne Mason (1807–1884), a farmer's daughter who taught at the Baptist Sunday school in Barrowden, married Thomas Cook here on 2 March 1833.

The Rutland Round and Jurassic Way long-distance paths pass through the village. The village was served by Wakerley and Barrowden railway station from 1873 to 1966. The station was across the River Welland in the neighbouring parish of Wakerley, Northamptonshire.

Barrowden is part of Ketton ward on Rutland County Council.
