= St Nicholas' Church, Pilton =

Church in Pilton, Rutland, England

Coordinates: 52°37′00″N 0°39′01″W

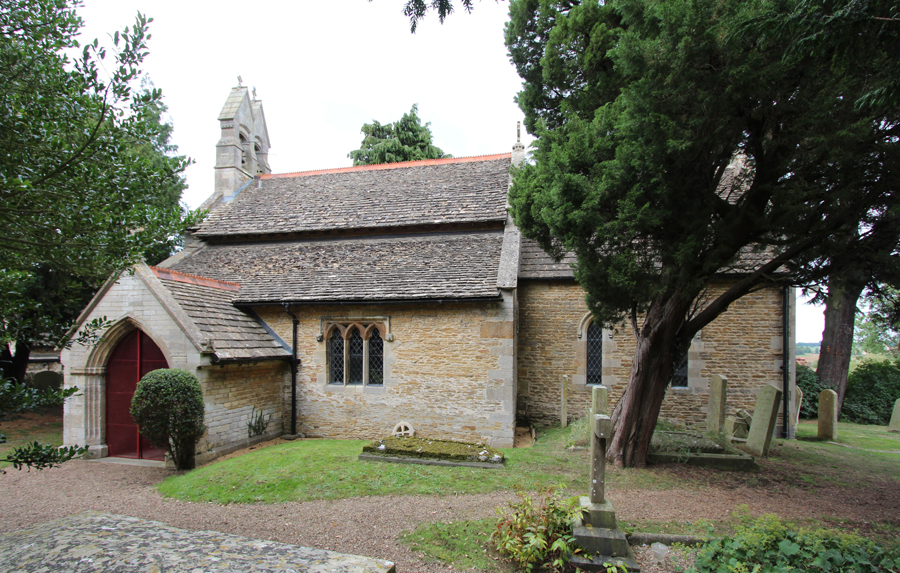
- Denomination: Church of England

History
- Dedication: St Nicholas

Administration
- Diocese: Peterborough
- Parish: Pilton, Rutland

St Nicholas' Church is the Church of England parish church in Pilton, Rutland. It is a Grade II* listed building.

== History ==
The church consists of a south aisle, chancel, porch, nave and a double bell-cote. The oldest parts of the church are the doorways and arcades.

The chancel was rebuilt in 1852 under Charles John Ellicott, rector 1848–58 and later Bishop of Gloucester. The chancel, with a triple-lancet east window and two single lancets, is in 13th-century style. The church was restored and the porch was rebuilt in 1878 under James Fowler of Louth. The piscina and the windows in the south aisle date to the 14th century. The font is octagonal and likely dates from the 13th century.
