= Pilton, Rutland =

Village in Rutland, England

Coordinates: 52.616°N 0.651°W

Pilton
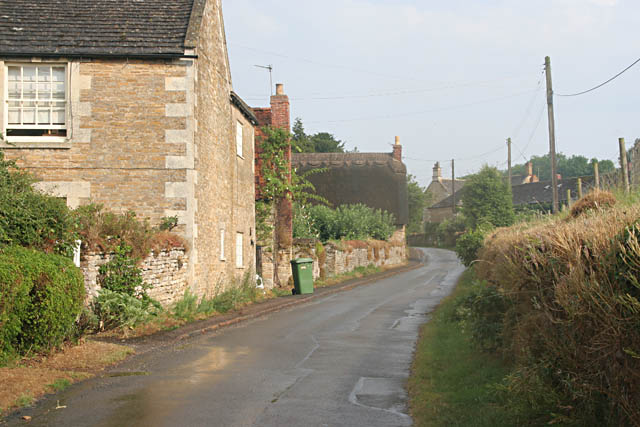

- Location within Rutland
- Area: 0.54 sq mi (1.4 km^{2})
- Population: 39 2001 Census
  - Density: 72/sq mi (28/km^{2})
- OS grid reference: SK914029
  - London: 80 miles (130 km) SSE
- Unitary authority: Rutland
- Shire county: Rutland
- Ceremonial county: Rutland
- Region: East Midlands
- Country: England
- Sovereign state: United Kingdom
- Post town: OAKHAM
- Postcode district: LE15
- Dialling code: 01572
- Police: Leicestershire
- Fire: Leicestershire
- Ambulance: East Midlands
- UK Parliament: Rutland and Stamford

Pilton is a small village and civil parish in the county of Rutland in the East Midlands of England. The population of the village was 39 at the 2001 census. This remained less than 100 and was included in the civil parish of Lyndon.

The village's name means 'farm/settlement with a creek', perhaps referring to the River Chater. Though, 'shaft' and 'willow-tree' have been thought of as possible first elements.

It is a mile or two south of Rutland Water, and near North Luffenham, Wing and Lyndon. To the east of the village is the site of the former Pilton Brick & Tile Works which was part of the Normanton estate, owned by the Earls of Ancaster.

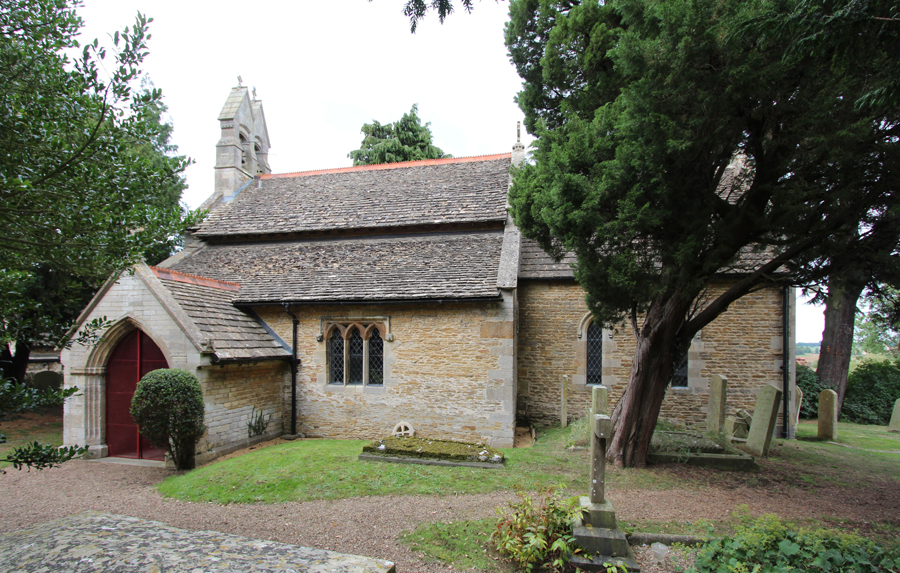
St Nicholas' Church, Pilton

St Nicholas' Church, Pilton is a Grade II* listed building.
