= Whitwell, Rutland =

Village in Rutland, England

Coordinates: 52.670°N 0.636°W

Whitwell
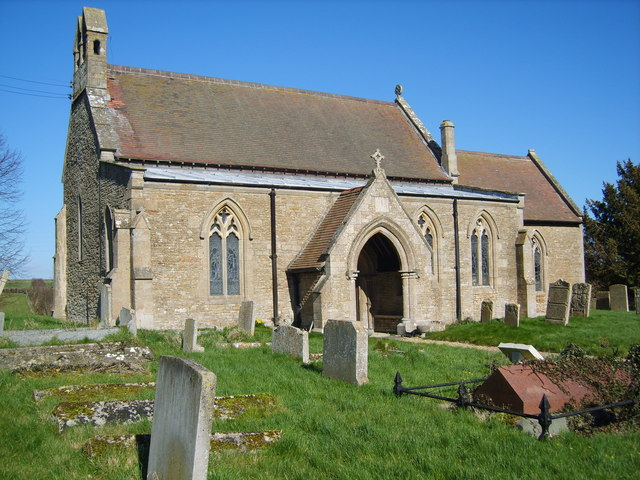
- Church of St Michael and All Angels, Whitwell

- Location within Rutland
- Area: 0.98 sq mi (2.5 km^{2})
- Population: 41 2001 Census
  - Density: 42/sq mi (16/km^{2})
- OS grid reference: SK923088
  - London: 84 miles (135 km) SSE
- Unitary authority: Rutland
- Shire county: Rutland
- Ceremonial county: Rutland
- Region: East Midlands
- Country: England
- Sovereign state: United Kingdom
- Post town: OAKHAM
- Postcode district: LE15
- Dialling code: 01572
- Police: Leicestershire
- Fire: Leicestershire
- Ambulance: East Midlands
- UK Parliament: Rutland and Stamford

Whitwell is a village and civil parish in the county of Rutland in the East Midlands of England. The population at the 2001 census was 41. At the 2011 census the population remained less than 100 and was included together with the neighbouring parish of Exton.

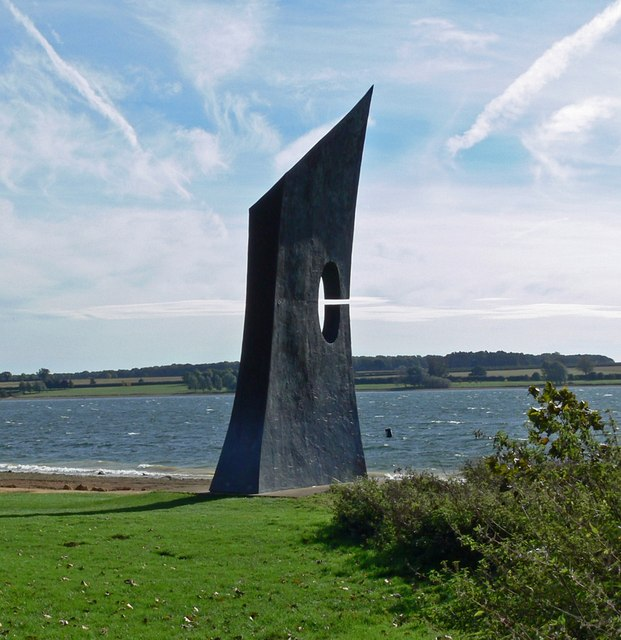
The Great Tower sculpture on the shore of Rutland Water

It is located on the A606, about four miles (6 km) east of Oakham, on the north shore of Rutland Water with car parking off Bull Brig Lane. Whitwell Harbour is a popular sailing and water sports area and a pleasure boat known as the Rutland Belle operates from the harbour. Whitwell is one of the smallest villages in Rutland; it only has 19 houses, plus The Noel pub, the name of which comes from the Earls of Gainsborough, who were landholders in the area.

The village's name means 'spring/stream which is white', probably meaning it was infertile.

== Twin town ==
Whitwell claims to be twinned with Paris, France. In 1980, regulars from the pub, the Noel Arms wrote to the then Mayor of Paris, Jacques Chirac proposing the link and with a tight deadline for a response. As no answer arrived from the Mayor's office by the set date, the village unilaterally declared itself to be twinned and erected road signs to that effect. The original wooden signs were later replaced in metal by Rutland County Council.
