= Belton-in-Rutland =

Village and civil parish in Rutland, England

Coordinates: 52.60°N 0.80°W

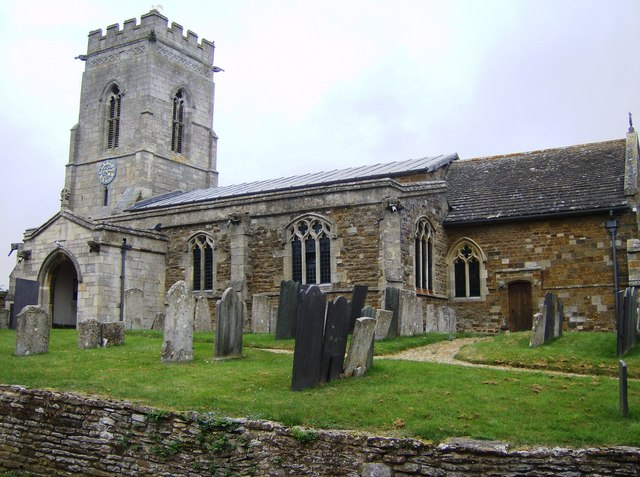
- St Peter's Church, Belton

- Location within Rutland
- Area: 1.6 sq mi (4.1 km^{2})
- Population: 335 2001 Census
  - Density: 209/sq mi (81/km^{2})
- OS grid reference: SK816014
  - London: 82 miles (132 km) SSE
- Unitary authority: Rutland
- Shire county: Rutland
- Ceremonial county: Rutland
- Region: East Midlands
- Country: England
- Sovereign state: United Kingdom
- Post town: OAKHAM
- Postcode district: LE15
- Dialling code: 01572
- Police: Leicestershire
- Fire: Leicestershire
- Ambulance: East Midlands
- UK Parliament: Rutland and Stamford

Belton-in-Rutland is a village and civil parish in the county of Rutland in the East Midlands of England. The population at the 2001 census was 345 increasing to 348 at the 2011 census. It is situated about six miles (9.6 km) southwest of Oakham and about four miles (6.4 km) west of Uppingham and overlooks the A47. The Eye Brook forms the county boundary with Leicestershire.

The village's name probably means 'farm/settlement near a beacon or funeral pyre'. Then again, 'Bel' may likewise address a component signifying 'island' or 'glade'. Belton was renamed Belton-in-Rutland in 1982 to distinguish the village from Belton in Leicestershire.

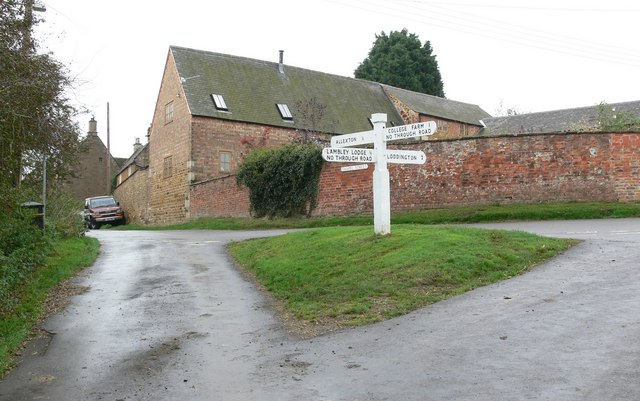
Crossroads in the village

In May 1776 the village was nearly destroyed by a fire that was fought with the help of Rutland Militia men who were then doing annual training at Oakham. The fire had been started by a servant girl throwing discarded coals from a window and was put out as it reached the church.

St Peter's Church is a Grade II* listed building. The Old Hall and Westbourne House are also Grade II*.

The village has one public house, The Sun Inn.

Belton is part of the Braunston & Martinsthorpe ward which elects two councillors to Rutland County Council.
