= Cottesmore =

Cottesmore may refer to:

- Cottesmore, Rutland, England
- Cottesmore Hunt, fox hunt, formerly kennelled in Cottesmore, Rutland
- Cottesmore School, a prep school in Sussex, England
- HMS Cottesmore, the name of three Royal Navy ships
- RAF Cottesmore, Royal Air Force station
  - Kendrew Barracks, the current use of the above station
