= St Nicholas' Church, Cottesmore =

Church in Cottesmore, Rutland

Coordinates: 52°42′47″N 0°39′56″W

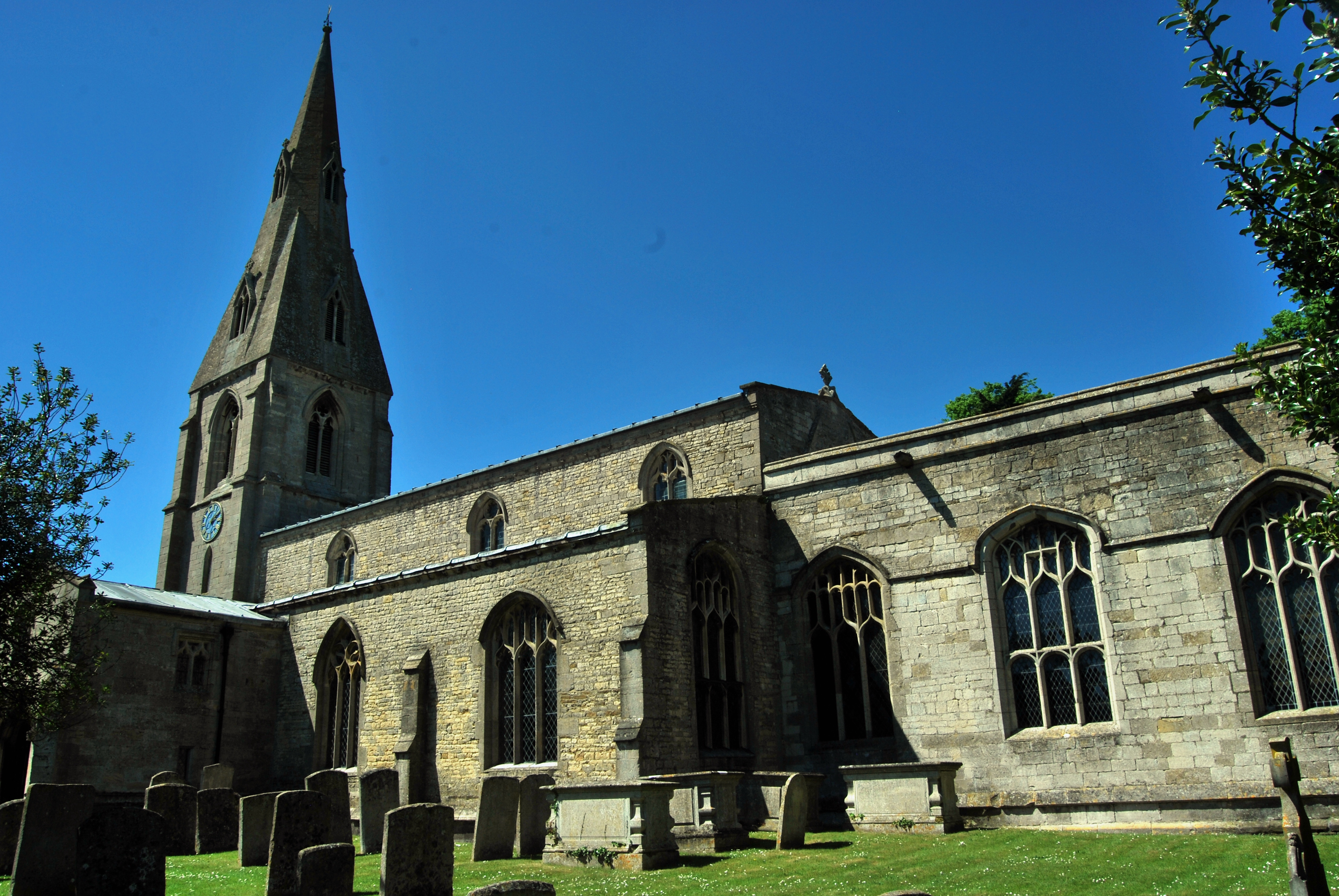
- Denomination: Church of England

History
- Dedication: St Nicholas

Administration
- Diocese: Peterborough
- Parish: Cottesmore, Rutland

Clergy
- Vicar(s): Anthony Oram

St Nicholas' Church is a church in Cottesmore, Rutland. It is a Grade II* listed building.

The Cottesmore Benefice is part of the North Rutland Churches group.

== History ==
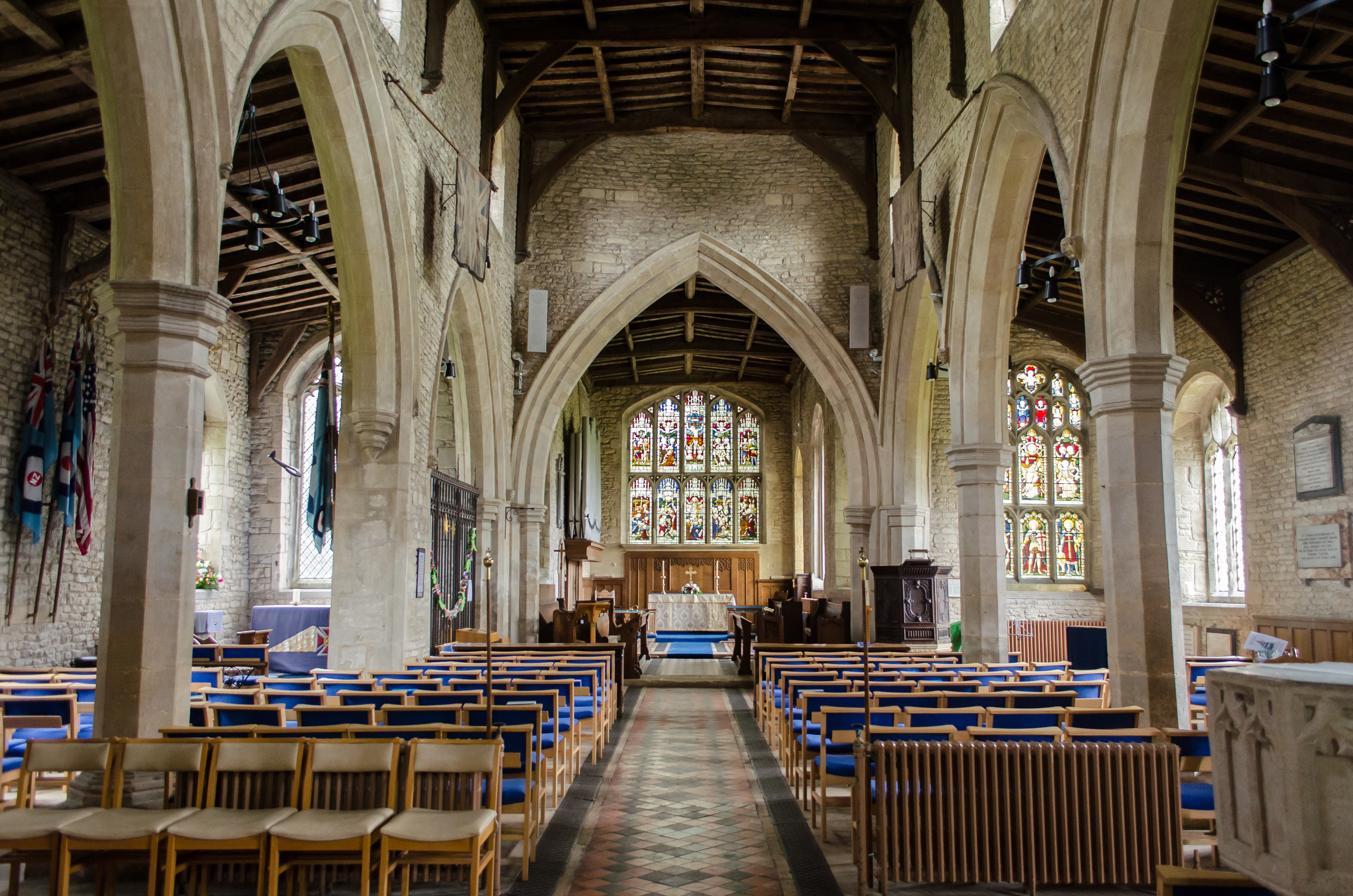
Interior, looking east; the RAF chapel is to the left

The current church mostly dates from the 13th and 14th centuries, and is built of stone from Clipsham, which is nearby. Most of the decoration of the church dates back to the rebuilding in the Edwardian period. The tower dates to the 14th century. In the northern wall some 12th-century stonework can be seen, and at the eastern end of the church some stonework set into buttresses can be seen.

The southern doorway has zigzag patterns possibly dating from the 12th century. The tower has three bells, the earliest dating back to 1598.

The base of the 12th-century font was used as a horse-stone at Cottesmore Hall, and doesn't match the bowl. The base was probably used as part of a cross in the churchyard. The font features a crucifixion scene and a bishop carrying out a blessing.

A 16th-century grave slab has been mentioned being in the southern aisle, but it is now covered by chairs and is difficult to see.

A stained-glass window was erected to the memory of Major General George Williams Knox CB (1838 - 1894). The colours of the 1st Battalion Scots Guards were gifted to the church by his widow and hang in the nave.

The north aisle forms a RAF chapel, dedicated in 1949 to commemorate those who died whilst working at RAF Cottesmore during the Second World War. It was designed by Sir Giles Gilbert Scott. When No. 98 Squadron RAF was disbanded in 1976, its colours were laid-up in the chapel.

There is a lifebuoy from a Second World War destroyer named HMS Cottesmore. The ship was 'adopted' by Rutland for National Savings Warship Week Campaign held in 1942.

In the churchyard, you can find the grave of Richard Westbrook Baker (1789-1861), Sheriff of Rutland, who developed the Rutland Plough and originated, in 1830, the small allotment system. Also, the graves of the people who were part of the Cottesmore Hunt. Starting in 1732, it is one of the oldest hunts in the country.

== Rectors ==
- William Brereton
- John Bury
- Peter Gunning
- Weston Stewart
