= Quorn Hunt =

British fox hunting pack

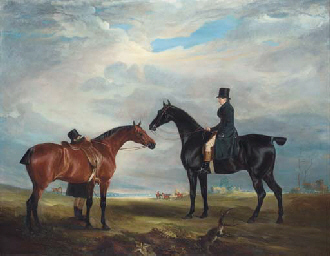
- Frank Hall Standish with the Quorn Hunt, by John Ferneley, Snr, 1819
- Hunt type: Fox hunting
- Country: England

History
- Founded: 1696
- Founded by: Mr Thomas Boothby

Hunt information
- Hound breed: Foxhound
- Hunt country: Leicestershire
- Master(s): Colin Russell, MFH; Mrs Jacqueline Russell, MFH; Dominic Gwyn-Jones, MFH; Mrs Louisa Gwyn-Jones, MFH; Philip Adkins, MFH; Ian Jalland, MFH; John Mann, MFH; Chris Price, MFH
- Huntsman: Mr Aidan Beaney
- Whipper(s)-in: Mr Aiden Tummey
- Quarry: none - manually-laid trail
- Kennelled: Kirby Bellars
- Website: quorn-hunt.co.uk

The Quorn Hunt, usually called the Quorn, established in 1696, is one of the world's oldest fox hunting packs and claims to be the United Kingdom's most famous hunt. Its country is mostly in Leicestershire, together with some smaller areas of Nottinghamshire and Derbyshire.

After the abolition of traditional fox hunting implemented by the Hunting Act 2004, the Quorn continues to go out on four days of the week during the autumn and winter months, saying it operates within the constraints of the law.

== History ==
The hunt traces its origins to a pack of foxhounds established in 1696 at Tooley Park, Leicestershire, by the youthful Thomas Boothby (1677–1752). Its present name comes from the village of Quorn, also known as Quorndon, where the hounds were kennelled between 1753 and 1904. They were established there by the hunt's second master, Hugo Meynell, who bought Quorndon Hall from the 4th Earl Ferrers. Following more than half a century under the leadership of Boothby, Meynell was Master for forty-seven years. He was known for his innovative mastery of fox hunting and has been called 'The Primate of the Science'.

In 1905, new kennels and stables were built at Paudy Lane, Seagrave; these are now listed buildings. The hunt's present-day kennels are at Gaddesby Lane, Kirby Bellars, near Melton Mowbray.

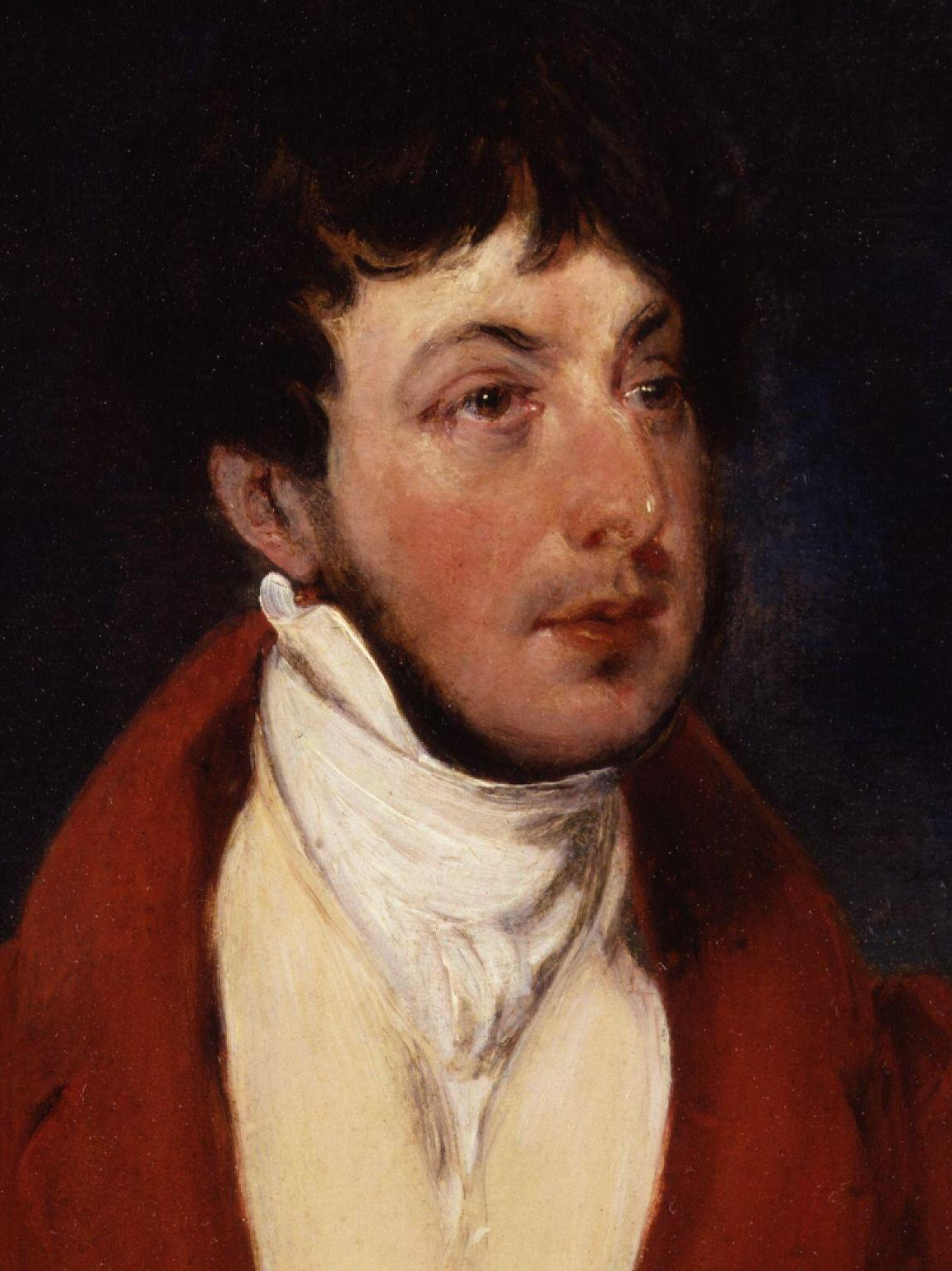
George Osbaldeston, Master 1817–1821 and 1823–1827

Among many notable Masters was George Osbaldeston, who in 1823 became the first to return to the Mastership after having previously retired.

Before gaining its present title in the mid-19th century, the hunt was often known by the name of its Master: for instance, from 1827 to 1831 it was called 'Lord Southampton's Hounds'. Until 1884, the hounds were owned by the Master, and a change of mastership took place either by purchase or inheritance. The hounds are now said to be "owned by the country", that is, by the hunt members.

In 1890, Algernon Burnaby and Count Eliot Zborowski together planned the Quorn Hunt's famous Midnight Steeplechase, a jumping race in the middle of the night over twelve furlongs, with the riders dressed in nightshirts and top hats and the fences lit by oil lamps. Burnaby was the triumphant winner, gaining a silver cup provided by Zborowski. The race is commemorated in sporting prints.

A Great Depression began in 1929, and subscriptions to the hunt began to fall. Burnaby, Master since 1912, recruited Sir Harold Nutting of Quenby Hall, "newly rich from bottling Guinness", as his joint Master, and quipped "We don't want your personality, we want your purse!" Jane Ridley has estimated that during the following ten years Nutting spent about £15,000 a year on the Quorn.

Three Hunt-class warships of the Royal Navy have been called HMS Quorn, after the Hunt.

== Country ==
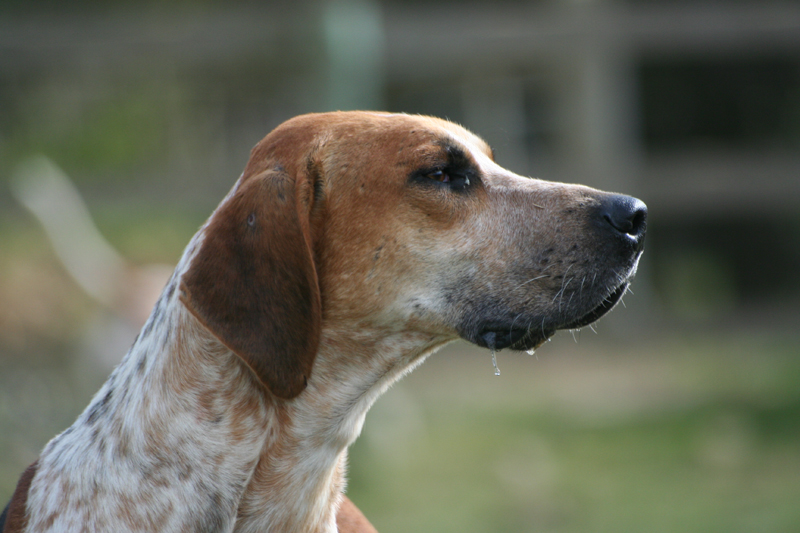
English Foxhound

The Quorn hunts in a wide area of Leicestershire, plus some coverts in Nottinghamshire and Derbyshire, stretching from just south of Nottingham to the edge of the city of Leicester and from Melton Mowbray westwards to Ashby de la Zouch. On the eastern side of the country lies a rolling open landscape, with good fences to jump, while to the west are the wooded uplands of Charnwood Forest and the Pennine Chain. The best centres are around Melton Mowbray, Leicester and Loughborough.

In 1853, the southern part of its country was separated off to form the Fernie.

The adjoining hunts are the Meynell and South Staffs (to the north west), the South Notts (to the north), the Belvoir (to the north east), the Cottesmore (to the south east), the Fernie (to the south), and the Atherstone (to the south west).

== Season and supporters ==
Hunting takes place on Mondays, Tuesdays, Fridays and (formerly) Saturdays, in the autumn and winter months only. More open country is hunted on Mondays and Fridays, the most popular days, with usually between one hundred and one hundred and fifty mounted followers, plus about twice as many who follow hounds on foot and with cars and bicycles. The smallest number of followers is on Tuesdays. Over eight hundred farmers in the country of the Quorn allow the hunt to use their land. There is a Supporters' Association.

The hunt's 'Saturday Country' was formerly around Belton, Staunton Harold and Kingston and has its own 'Saturday Country Wire and Damage Fund'.

== List of Masters ==
- 1696 to 1752: Mr Thomas Boothby
- 1753 to 1800: Mr Hugo Meynell
- 1800 to 1805: William Molyneux, 2nd Earl of Sefton
- 1805 to 1806: Thomas Foley, 3rd Baron Foley
- 1806 to 1817: Mr Thomas Assheton Smith the Younger
- 1817 to 1821: Mr George Osbaldeston
- 1821 to 1823: Sir Bellingham Graham, 7th Baronet
- 1823 to 1827: Mr George Osbaldeston (again)
- 1827 to 1831: Charles FitzRoy, 3rd Baron Southampton
- 1831 to 1833: Sir Harry Goodricke
- 1833 to 1835: Mr Holyoake Goodricke
- 1835 to 1838: Mr Rowland Errington
- 1838 to 1839: Edward Harbord, 4th Baron Suffield
- 1839 to 1841: Mr Thomas Hodgson
- 1841 to 1847: Mr Henry Greene, of Rolleston
- 1847 to 1856: Sir Richard Sutton, 2nd Baronet
- 1856 to 1863: George Grey, 7th Earl of Stamford
- 1863 to 1866: Mr Samuel Clowes
- 1866 to 1868: The Marquess of Hastings
- 1868 to 1870: Mr John Chaworth Musters
- 1870 to 1884: Mr John Coupland
- 1884 to 1896: John Manners-Sutton, 3rd Baron Manners
- 1886 to 1893: Captain Warner (jointly)
- 1886 to 1893: William Byerley Paget (jointly)
- 1893 to 1898: Hugh Lowther, 5th Earl of Lonsdale
- 1898 to 1905: Captain E. ('Tommy') Burns Hartopp
- 1905 to 1918: Captain Francis ('Frank') Forester
- 1912 to 1932: Major Algernon E. Burnaby
- 1919 to 1928: W. E. Paget
- 1930 to 1940: Lt-Col. Sir Harold Nutting
- 1940 to 1947: Major P. Cantrell-Hubbersty (acting)
- 1948 to 1951: Mrs P. Cantrell-Hubbersty

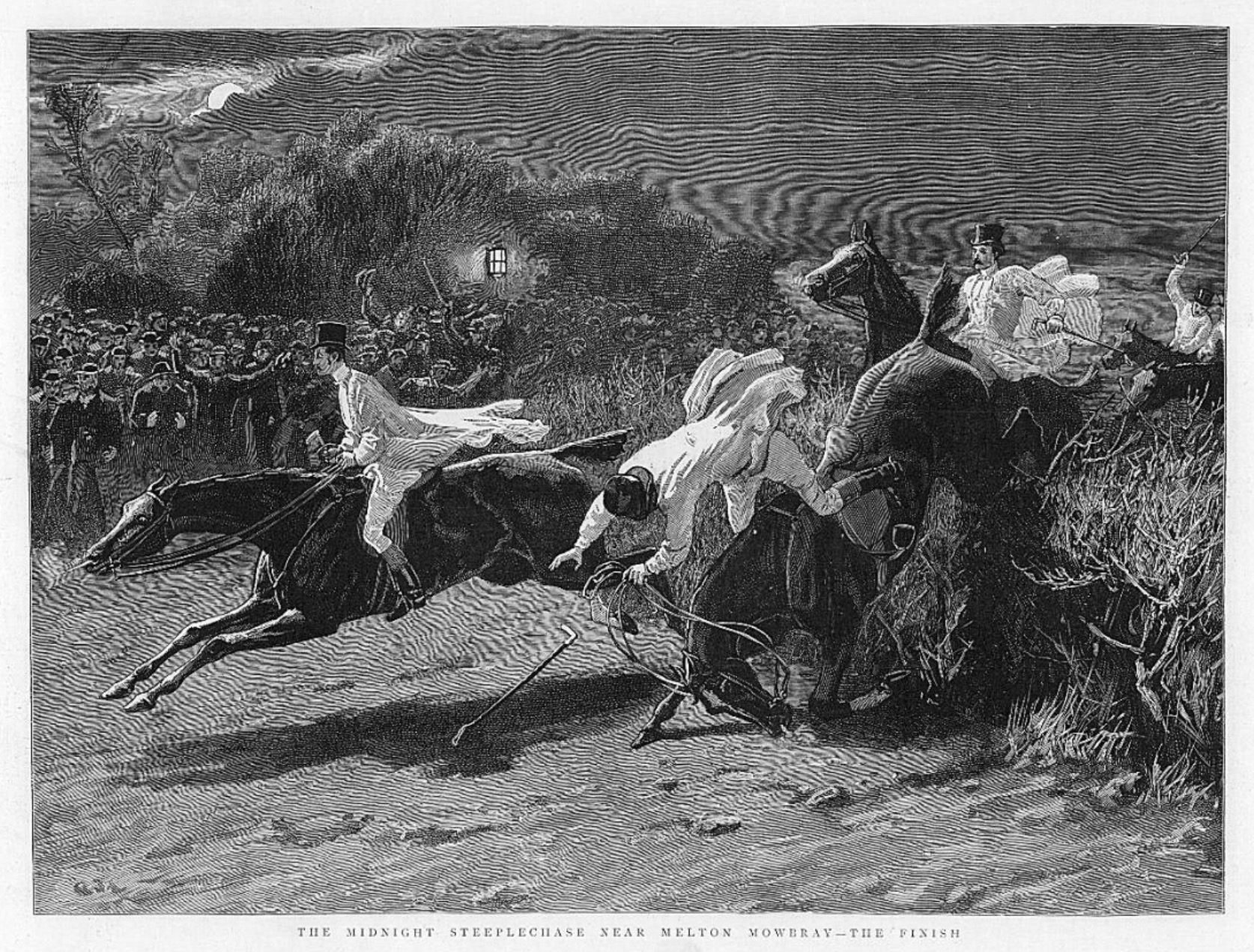
A future Master, Algernon Burnaby, winning the Midnight Steeplechase of 1890

- 1948 to 1951: Mr F. S. Mee
- 1948 to 1954: Ronald Strutt, 4th Baron Belper
- 1954 to 1960: Lt-Col. G. A. Murray-Smith
- 1959 to 1962: Mrs G. A. Murray-Smith
- 1959 to 1985: Mrs Ulrica Murray-Smith
- 1960 to 1962: Lt-Col. T. C. Llewellen Palmer
- 1960 to 1962: Captain E. O. Corsfield
- 1962 to 1965: Brigadier R. G. Tilney
- 1965 to 1972: Captain J. D. A. Keith
- 1972 to 1985: Captain F. G. Barker
- 1975 to 1983: Mr A. J. M. Teacher
- 1985 to 1991: Mr J. Bealby
- 1985 to 1991: Mr E. R. Hanbury
- 1985 to 1991: Mr W. B. Hercock
- 1991 to 1994: Captain Fred. G. Barker (again)
- 1992 to 1994: Mr A. R. Macdonald Buchanan
- 1992 to 1995: Mrs D. E. H. Turner
- 1992 to 2000: Mr C. H. Geary
- 1994 to 1995: Mr R. G. Henson
- 1995 to 1996: Mr R. S. Morely
- 1995 to 1996: Mr R. Carden
- 1996 to 1997: Mr Robin C. Smith-Ryland
- 1992 to 2000: Mr Rad T. Thomas
- 1998 to 2000: Mr A. W. R. Dangar
- 1997 to 2003: Mr A. R. P. Carden
- 2000 to 2004: Mr R. Hunnisett
- 2002 to 2005: Mr W. Cursham

== Post-ban ==
"Hunting wild mammals with a dog" was made unlawful in England and Wales by the Hunting Act 2004, which came into effect in 2005, and the Quorn Hunt says that it operates within the law. A number of exemptions stated in Schedule 1 of the 2004 Act permit some previously unusual forms of hunting wild mammals with dogs to continue, such as "hunting ... for the purpose of enabling a bird of prey to hunt the wild mammal".

In March 2021, during a lockdown of the COVID-19 pandemic, the Quorn Hunt was criticised for carrying out activities to celebrate the birthday of its master. Reportedly people and hounds travelled out of the Quorn's county to the Burley-on-the-Hill area, and engaged in illegal hunting. One supporter of a neighbouring hunt called for the resignation of all Quorn Hunt masters involved in the event claiming "complete disregard and disrespect for the thousands who have died from Covid-19". The Countryside Alliance clarified that any of its members present were there in a private capacity, not representing the Alliance, adding "There is no excuse for anyone to be engaged in trail hunting activity during this time".

In December 2022, the Quorn's Hunstman Ollie Finnegan pleaded guilty to a charge of hunting with dogs unlawfully on 7 January 2022, at a joint meet with the Ledbury Hunt in Gloucestershire. He was fined £656.

== Quorn Hunt Ball ==
There is an annual Quorn Hunt Ball. In 2014, it took place at Two Temple Place in Westminster, but one also takes place in Leicestershire in each year.

== Bibliography ==
- William Charles Arlington Blew, The Quorn Hunt and its masters, with illustrations by Henry Alken (London: John C. Nimmo, 1899)
- William Scarth Dixon, The Quorn Hunt
- Lady Augusta Fane, Chit-Chat (London: Thornton Butterworth, 1926)
- Daphne Machin Goodall, Huntsmen of the Golden Age (London: H.F. & G. Witherby, 1956)
- Roy Heron, Tom Firr of the Quorn, Huntsman Extraordinary (Liss: Nimrod Book Services, 1984)
- Ulrica Murray-Smith, Magic of the Quorn (London: J. A. Allen & Co., 1980)
- J. Otho Paget, Memories of the Shires (Methuen, 1920, republ. 2012)
- "Cecil", The Quorn Hunt: the Accustomed Places of Meeting, with Distances from Railway Stations, circa 1870

== See also ==
- List of fox hunts in the United Kingdom
- English Foxhound
