= George Williams Knox =

British soldier

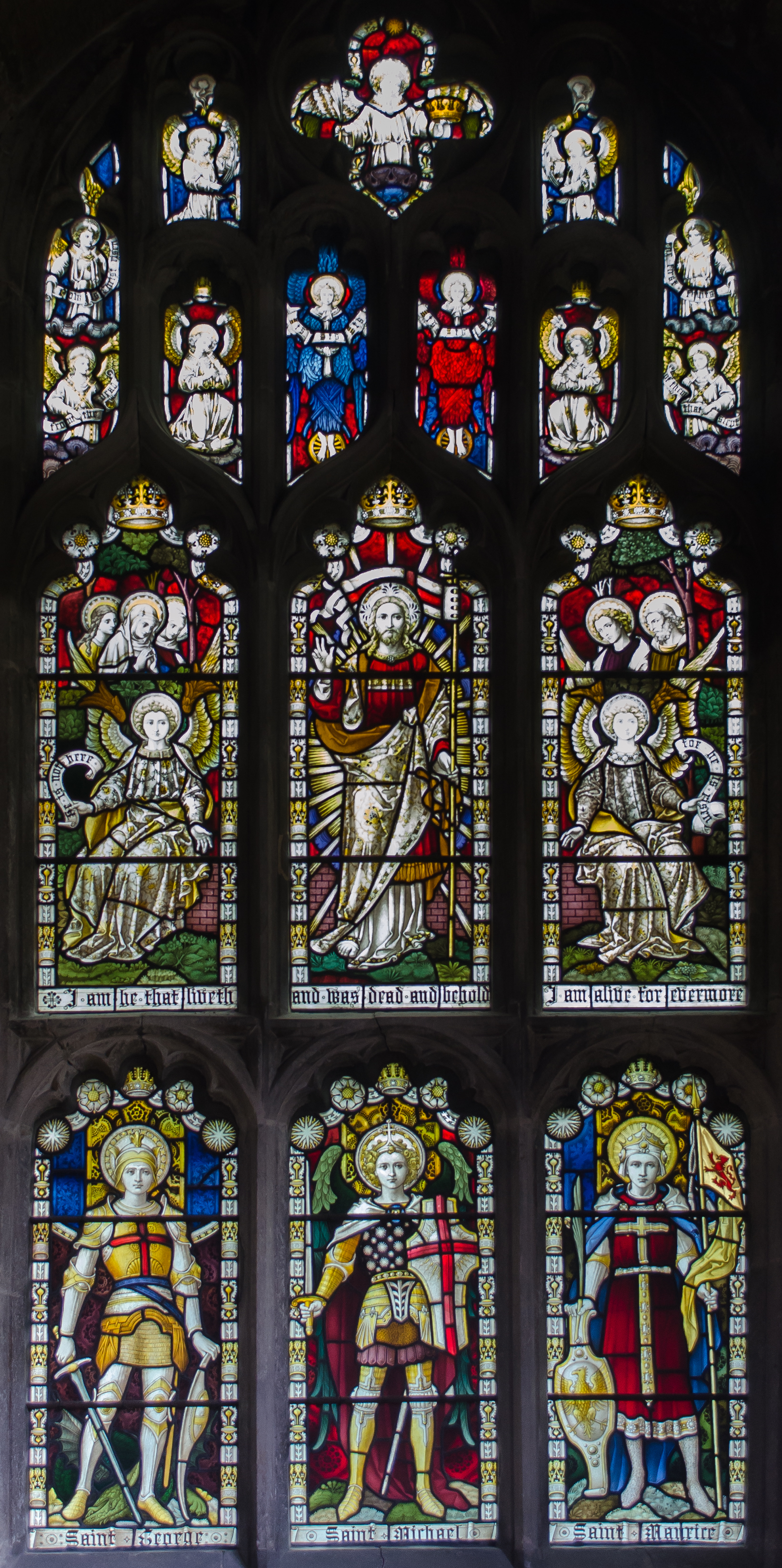
Memorial window in St Nicholas' Church, Cottesmore

Major-General George Williams Knox CB (18 January 1838 – 6 March 1894) was a British Army officer.

Knox was born in Leamington Priors the son of Brownlow Knox and Louisa Sutton. He was commissioned in the Scots Fusilier Guards in January 1855 and served in the Crimean War with the Scots Fusilier Guards. He commanded the 1st Battalion of the Scots Guards during the Anglo-Egyptian War 1882. Knox was present at the Battle of Tel-el-Kebir and received a mention in despatches.

Knox was created a Companion of the Order of the Bath in November 1882.

On 30 April 1886, in Cottesmore, Rutland, Knox married Lady Sybil Emily Lowther, eldest daughter of Henry Lowther, 3rd Earl of Lonsdale. He died at Bulstrode Street in London on 6 March 1894. A stained glass window in the Church of St Nicholas, Cottesmore was "erected by his sorrowing and broken hearted wife" to his memory. The colours of the 1st Battalion Scots Guards were gifted to the church by his widow and hang in the nave.
