= Henry Field (anthropologist) =

American anthropologist and archaeologist

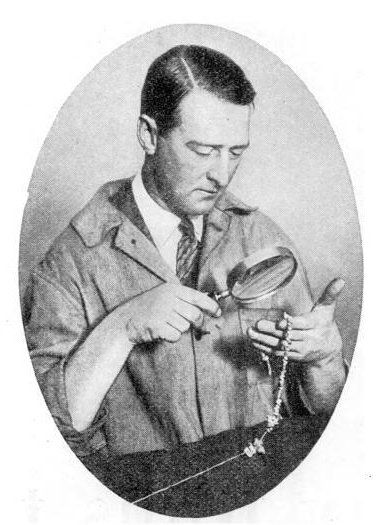
- Field examining an ancient necklace.
- Born: December 15, 1902; Chicago
- Died: January 4, 1986 (aged 83); Coral Gables, Florida
- Education: Oxford (B.A., 1925; M.A., 1930; D.Sc., 1937)
- Scientific career
- Fields: Anthropology; Publishing
- Workplaces: Field Museum of Natural History; Peabody Museum of Archaeology and Ethnology at Harvard University; University of Miami
- Academic advisors: Henry Balfour, R.R. Marett

Henry Field (December 15, 1902 – January 4, 1986) was an American anthropologist and archaeologist.

== Early life ==
Field was born in Chicago, a great nephew of the merchant Marshall Field and a great nephew of Barbour Lathrop. His parents' marriage did not last long, and his mother, Minna Field, married secondly Algernon Burnaby of Baggrave Hall, Hungarton, Leicestershire, England, where Field grew up. He was educated at Sunningdale, Eton, and Oxford (B.A., 1925; M.A., 1930; D.Sc., 1937).

== Early career ==
After being awarded his first degree, Field moved back to Chicago in 1926 to begin working for the Field Museum of Natural History in Chicago as assistant curator of physical anthropology. Field's first participation in an expedition was in the University of Oxford/Field Museum excavation of Kish. His work included 5000 photographs of the excavations and portraits of the modern villagers.

Beginning in the late 1920s the Field Museum began planning for the upcoming Chicago World's Fair. Field supervised the creation of two permanent exhibitions. The "Hall of Prehistoric Man" had nine full-size dioramas of early life augmented by artifacts collected by Field. The "Hall of the Races of Mankind" had over 100 full sized sculptures of different races by the renowned sculptor Malvina Hoffman. The exhibitions were ready on time for the opening of the fair on 30 May 1933.

In 1934, Field was promoted to Head Curator of physical anthropology. One important acquisition Field made for the Museum was "Magdalenian Girl" which is still on display today and remains the most complete Upper Paleolithic skeleton available for study in North America. Field went back to Iraq in 1934 and made anthropometric surveys of Marsh Arabs, Shammar bedouins, and Kurds.

== World War II ==
In 1941, just before America's entry into the Second World War, Field was asked to be the "Anthropologist to the President" by president Roosevelt and to be a member of the Special Intelligence Unit of the White House to direct a top-secret "M" ("M" for migration) project. The President believed that refugee migration and re-settlement in areas where they would be given asylum and be able to thrive would be one of the biggest issues of the post-war era. He wanted Field to look at under-populated areas in North Africa and the Middle East as possible sites for their resettlement. Over 600 studies were produced. Complete sets are held in several libraries including the Franklin D. Roosevelt Library at Hyde Park, NY and the University of Miami.

== Later career ==
Field was a Research Fellow at the Peabody Museum of Archaeology and Ethnology at Harvard University from 1950 to 1969. He was a member of the University of California African Expedition (1947–48), and the Peabody Museum- Harvard Expedition to the Near East and Pakistan. He moved to Coconut Grove, Florida, in the early 1950s and taught at the University of Miami, beginning in 1966. Doubleday published his autobiography, The Track of Man, in 1952. In Coconut Grove he ran Field Research Projects, a publisher of scientific and educational materials. His third wife, Julia Allen Field was a lion trainer, zoo director, and environmental planner in Columbia. Field's two daughters are Mariana Field Hoppin, of New York, and Juliana Field, of Framingham, Massachusetts. He died in Coral Gables, Florida, in 1986.

The Special Collections department of the University of Miami library holds 35 boxes of the papers of Henry Field relating to the "M" project and several archaeology expeditions. In 2004-2005 The Peabody Museum of Archaeology and Ethnology at Harvard University put on an exhibition titled Field Photography, 1934, The Marsh Arabs of Iraq. This consisted of photographs taken during the Field Museum's Near East Expedition led by Henry Field in 1934. The world's attention was focused on the Marsh Arabs when Saddam Hussein began a genocide against these people in 1991 but after the end of the Iraq War they have begun coming back.

== Legacy ==
Henry Field is commemorated in the scientific name of a Middle Eastern viper, Pseudocerastes fieldi.

== Publications (partial) ==
- 1927-1930. Captain Marshall Field Expedition to Western Europe. Chicago: Field Museum of Natural History .
- 1929. with O.C. Farrington. Neanderthal (Mousterian) Man. Chicago: Field Museum of Natural History
- 1933. The Races of Mankind. An introduction to Chauncey Keep Memorial Hall. Chicago: Field Museum of Natural History
- 1935. Arabs of Central Iraq, Their History, Ethnology and Physical Characteristics. Chicago: Field Museum of Natural History.
- 1939. Contributions to the Anthropology of Iran. Chicago: Field Museum Press. 2 vols. Available as an e-book on the Internet Archive.
- 1948. Contributions to the Anthropology of the Soviet Union. Washington, DC.: Smithsonian Institution.
- 1949. The anthropology of Iraq. Chicago: Field Museum of Natural History.
- 1952. The Track of Man. New York: Doubleday. Reissued as a mass market paperback, revised and abridged by the author, in 1967 by Dell, New York.
- 1952. Contributions to the anthropology of the Faiyum, Sinai, Sudan [and] Kenya. Berkeley, CA: University of California Press.
- 1956. Ancient and Modern Man in Southwestern Asia. Coral Gables: University of Miami Press.
- 1959. An Anthropological Reconnaissance in West Pakistan, 1955. Cambridge, MA: Peabody Museum.

== Literature ==
- Redman, Samuel J. Bone Rooms: From Scientific Racism to Human Prehistory in Museums, Cambridge: Harvard University Press. 2016.

== Bibliography ==
- "Obituary". Chicago Tribune. January 9, 1986. Archived from the original on June 6, 2013.
- Dewachi, Omar (March 2005). ""Field" Photography: Anthropometry of the Marsh Arabs of Iraq, 1934". American University of Beirut, Beirut, Lebanon.
- Dewachi, Omar - Curator (28 February 2005). "Field Photography, 1934 / The Marsh Arabs of Iraq". Peabody Museum of Archaeology and Ethnology.
- "Anthropology, Europe and the Near East". Field Museum of Natural History.
- "FDR Library Archives". Hyde Park, NY: Franklin D. Roosevelt Library.
- "Field, Henry." Current Biography. 1955:207–209.
- "Field, Henry." (obituary) Current Biography. 1986:632.
- "Henry Field." (obituary) Washington Post. January 8, 1986.
- Field, Henry. Arabian Desert Tales between The Two Great Wars. Santa Fe, NM: Synergetic Press, 1976.
- Field, Henry. The Track of Man. New York: Doubleday, 1952.
- "Henry Field papers, 1943-1974". University of Miami Special Collections.
- The Legacy of Malvina Hoffman. Vol. 50. Field Museum of Natural History Bulletin. January 1979.
- Field Museum Podcast. "Exploring Kish". Field Museum of Natural History. Archived from the original on 12 October 2011.
- Field Museum Anthropology Research. "Biological Anthropology Research". Field Museum of Natural History.
- Field Museum Anthropology Collections. "Biological Anthropology Collections". Field Museum of Natural History.
- "Measuring the Other". Harvard Magazine. 1 January 2005.
- Leposky, Rosalie. "Marjory Stoneman Douglas's Friends... Henry Field". University of Miami. Archived from the original on 5 December 2014.
- Lester, Robert E., ed. (1994), PRESIDENT FRANKLIN D. ROOSEVELT'S Office Files, 1933–1945 Part 5 (PDF), Bethesda, MD: University Publications of America, ISBN 1-55655-496-6
- University of Miami Biography. "Henry Field Biography". University of Miami.
