= Elliott Zborowski =

American racing driver (1858–1903)

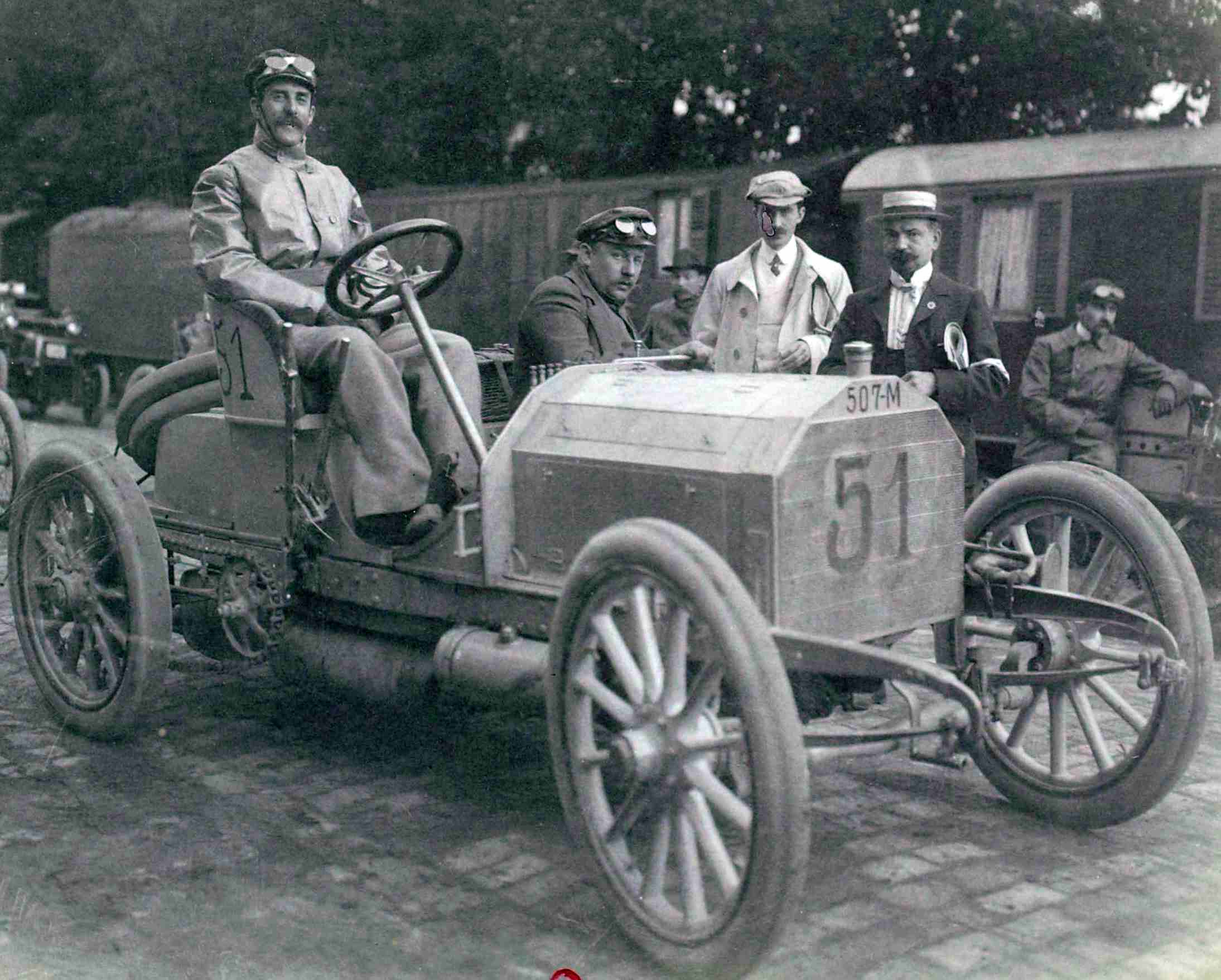
- Born: William Elliott Morris Zborowski; 1858
- Died: 1 April 1903 (aged 44–45)

William Elliott Morris Zborowski (1858 – April 1, 1903) was an American racing driver and father of racing driver Louis Zborowski.

== Early life and change of name ==
Martin Zabriskie, Elliott's father, left the United States for the first time in his life in 1873, when he crossed the Atlantic to Paris with his family to be at the wedding of his daughter Anna to Count Charles de Montsaulnin, Baron de Fontenay. The aristocratic world he saw in France made a deep impression and he thought back to stories passed down in the family; the first result of which was, he changed the spelling of his name to Zborowski. Martin's brother, Christopher, did not follow suit.

Following his father’s death in 1878, William Elliott returned from Europe to take possession of his inherited fortune. He also adopted his second name, and discarded William. Part of his inheritance was extensive estates near Central Park and along the banks of the Hudson River. Around this time, he began to refer to himself as Count Elliott Zborowski. An unattributed back-story also began of being descended from the marriage of an American girl to a Polish count. Elliott was reported to have said that he adopted the title Count on his father's death in deference to the wishes of his grandfather (Andrew Christian Zabriskie). The contents of Martin Zborowski’s will in The New York Times has no mention of his title.

== Inherited wealth brings marriage and a broader horizon ==
Horses were a passion for Elliott, and since his childhood he had a fine stable. He was an excellent rider and enjoyed the challenge of lengthy rides across rough country. Occasionally his daring left him injured, but it was all part of living life to the fullest. In 1885, having heard about hunting in England, he visited, was welcomed with enthusiasm, and was soon riding with the Quorn. His title seems to have been accepted from the first. Elliott quickly learnt the rules as he hunted and soon became known as someone well to the fore when a tall fence or broad ditch needed clearing. It also became accepted that his riding employed superb hand control. Something attributed to the Count was the tradition of tying a red ribbon at the base of a horse's tail, to distinguish it as a kicker.

Many kept hunting boxes in Melton Mowbray, and Zborowski looked around for somewhere suitable. With a hunting box nearby one could be fully immersed in this society. His attention was drawn to Coventry Lodge, which had good stabling and was owned by Sir Fredric Johnstone, a close friend of the Prince of Wales. Put on the market in 1881, Johnstone must have been relieved when in 1886, the Count became its new owner. Being very close to the station it was extremely convenient for someone always restlessly on the move.

Still regularly crossing the Atlantic, Elliott did so in the Spring of 1888 for part holiday, part business. After resolving the demands of business, he played polo, and found himself in a game reported as rough and bad-tempered. His injuries kept him off a horse for the rest of the summer. Holidaying in Newport, he met Margaret de Stuers (née Margaret Laura Astor Carey), aged 35 and who was already married, but unhappily. At first the friendship was platonic, and in September, Elliott returned to Britain. The New Year of 1890 found him back in America, where he again met Margaret. From this meeting, things became more serious and the end result was a very messy divorce in 1892.

Their New England friends disapproved of their behaviour, which ultimately meant they spent even more time in Britain, where few in their hunting set were troubled by the Countess being a divorcee. They resided in Melton Mowbray and he became a naturalised British citizen. Such was the popularity of the couple, the Prince of Wales often stayed at Coventry House. Their first child was born in 1893, but died soon after and was buried at Burton Lazars. In February 1895 a second son was born, Louis, and this time the child was more healthy. Elliott had by now altered his business life such that he would not need to return to America very much, and he rented and bought property in London for after the hunting season ended.

== The midnight steeplechase ==
Monday March 10, 1890, was the 32nd birthday of Lady Augusta Fane, eldest daughter of John Rous, 2nd Earl of Stradbroke, and she was dining at the Old Club in Melton Mowbray with 25 people. A few days before, Augusta had suggested a Moonlight Steeplechase to celebrate the event, as there was a full moon, and the idea was immediately seized upon and what was needed was decided.

At about 9.30 pm, a message came into the room that the sky had become overcast, with clouds obscuring the moon. This was a setback, but there was no thought of cancelling the event. Colonel Baldock slipped down to the Midland Railway’s station at the bottom of the street, calling for the stationmaster on the way. Here they borrowed a horse-drawn van, and with the help of a porter, a number of the station’s lamps were loaded inside. Off they went to the course and hung a lamp at each end of every fence. A further lamp was hung high in the tree at the homeward turn.

Eleven riders prepared for the race, and it may have been for visibility that caused them to ride wearing nightshirts. For those who were wintering at the Bell Hotel, Colonel Wilson, Algy Burnaby of Baggrave, and Colonel Hill Trevor, and those who lived locally, this was simple, but those who lived further out had had to borrow something. One rider struggled into a pink gossamer item donated by Lady Augusta.

It had been planned for the race to be run in secret, but this was a vain hope. The lanes all around were alive with people, carts, and carriages. A hum of excited chatter got stronger as the time approached. At 11.30, a horn was blown and the riders gathered at the start, and away they went, the riders’ nightshirts helping the spectators to pick out where they were. After the turn, the riders rode hard for the finish. Zborowski was neck and neck with Burnaby. A stumble by Zborowski’s horse let Burnaby through, and the Count finished second.

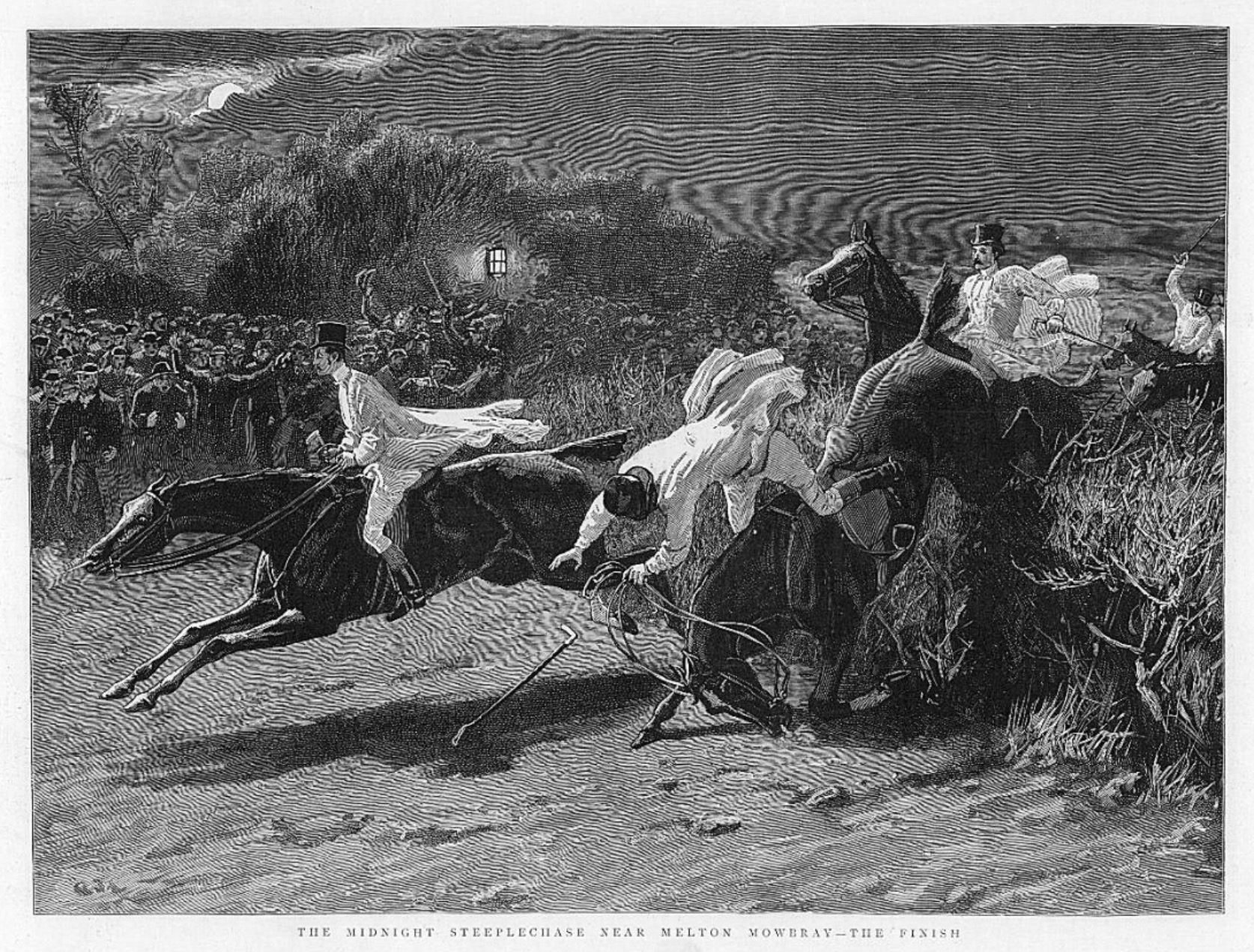
Algy Burnaby winning the Midnight Steeplechase, 1890

After the event, the riders and their guests attended a supper party hosted by Augusta at Coventry House, the Zborowski family residence in Melton Mowbray. Algy Burnaby received a silver-mounted ivory cup donated by the Count. Although Zborowski had also participated in the competition, Burnaby’s victory was noted as one of the memorable moments of the evening, which was later remembered for many years.

The following Sunday, the Vicar of Melton chose as his text Ephesians 5:11 ‘Have no fellowship with the unfruitful works of darkness, but rather reprove them’. It was decided not to take him to task over this, as it was thought he had made enough of a fool of himself already.

== Change of direction, cars ==
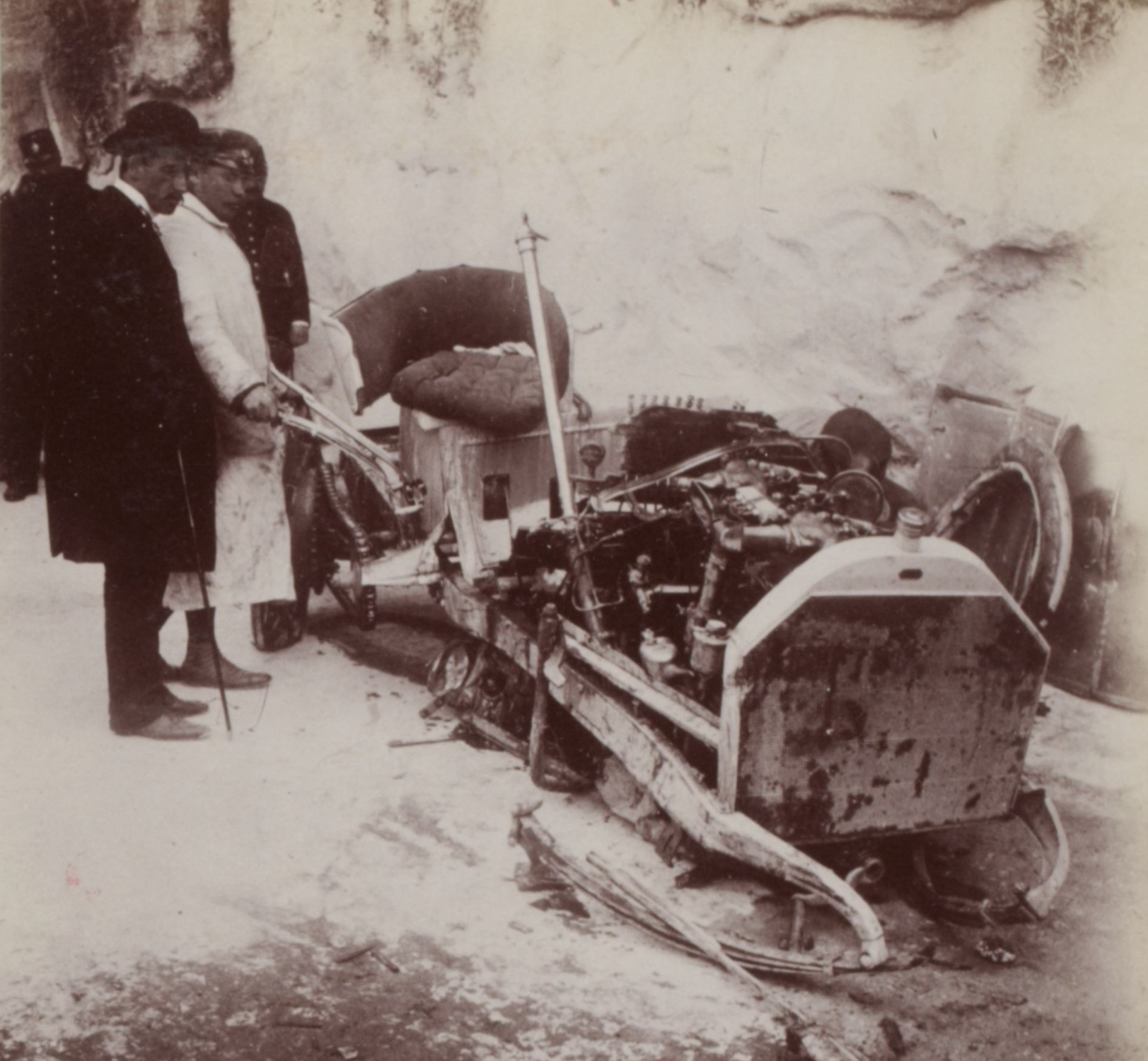
Elliott Zborowski's destroyed Mercedes at La Turbie, 1903

In 1898, following a friend’s motorised visit, Zborowski bought a de Dion Tricycle and learnt how to drive and maintain it. Driving became a new passion and he covered 5,000 miles in four months.

His wife Margaret, thought he should have a real car and not just a single-seater tricycle and Elliott agreed. Most cars and all innovation seemed to be coming from Germany, so that was where he looked. Daimler's were at Cannstatt, where the Zborowskis visited the works, choosing a "Phoenix" model. This was delivered to them at their London home, in January 1900. The Count immediately decided that he would drive to Coventry House, which he did, garaging his vehicle in an empty stable.

A few weeks later, there was a dinner-party at his house in which all the men had something in common: they owned a motor car. After dinner, the Count surprised the party when he announced that all his horses were to go as he had lost interest in them.

Zborowski was an all round sportsman but particularly liked Mercedes racing cars.

Zborowski was killed when his car crashed during the La Turbie hill climb in 1903. Baron de Pallange, who served as his riding mechanic, was thrown clear and survived.

His son Louis Zborowski also died in a motoring accident at the Italian Grand Prix in 1924.

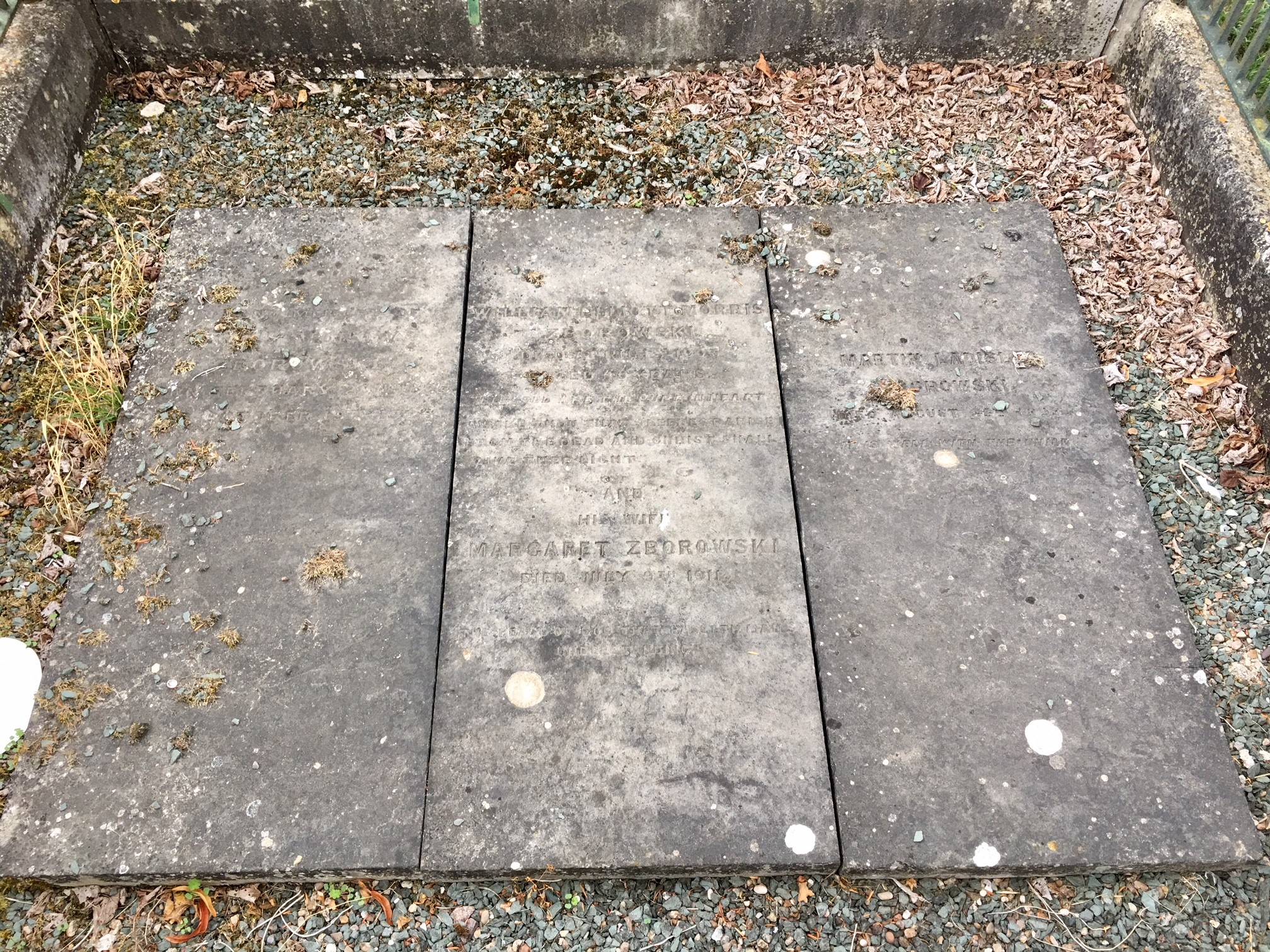
The grave of Elliott Zborowski in the churchyard of St James, Burton Lazars
