= Cottesmore Hunt =

Foxhound pack in Cottesmore, Britain

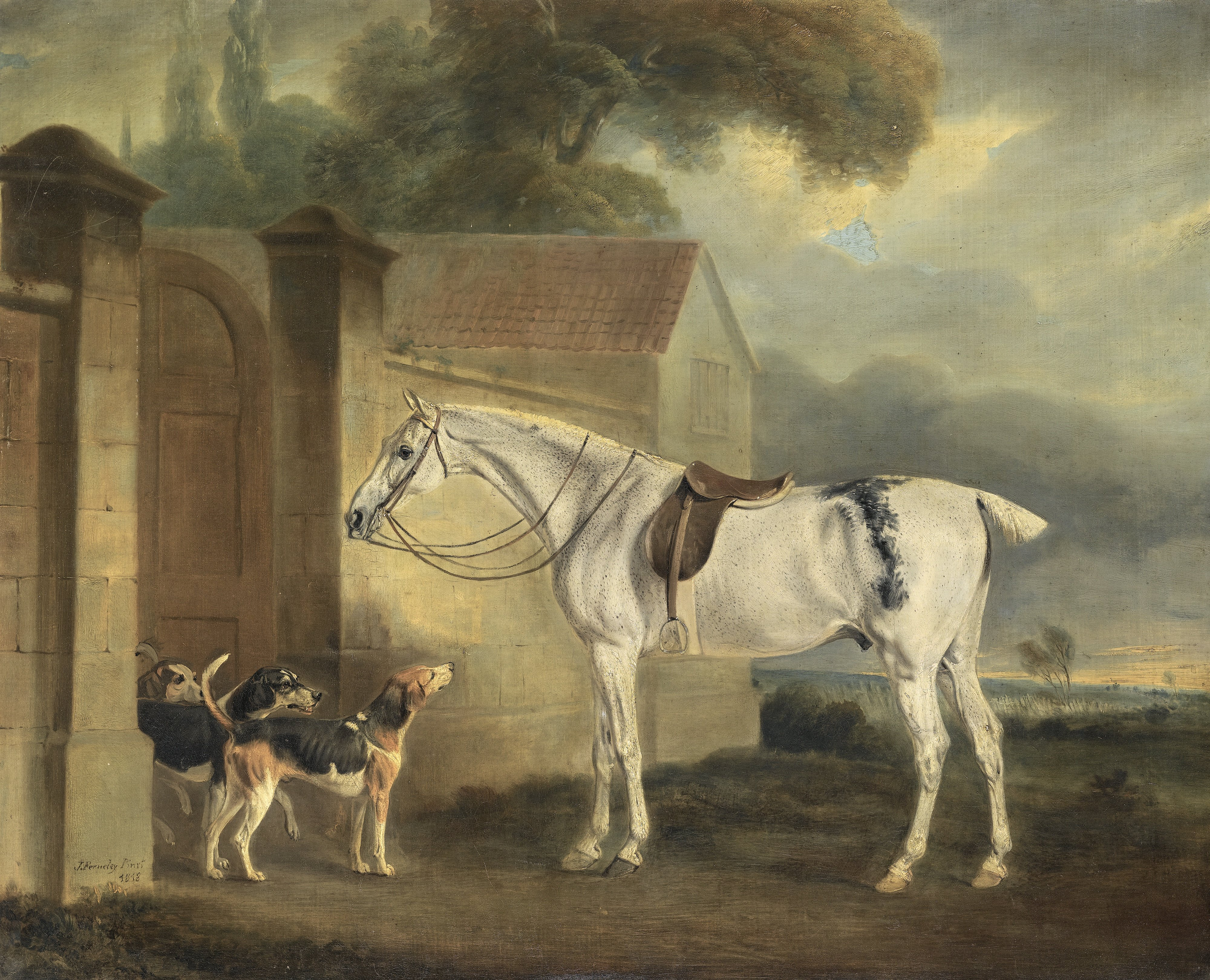
- Brass at Cottesmore with the Cottesmore Hounds, by John Ferneley, 1818
- Hunt type: Foxhunt
- Country: England

History
- Founded: 1666

Hunt information
- Hound breed: Foxhound
- Hunt country: Leicestershire, Rutland & Lincolnshire
- Quarry: Trail hunting
- Kennelled: Ashwell, Rutland
- Website: www.cottesmore-hunt.co.uk/

The Cottesmore Hunt, which hunts mostly in Rutland, is one of the oldest foxhound packs in Britain, with origins dating back to 1666. Its name comes from the village of Cottesmore where the hounds were kennelled.

== History ==
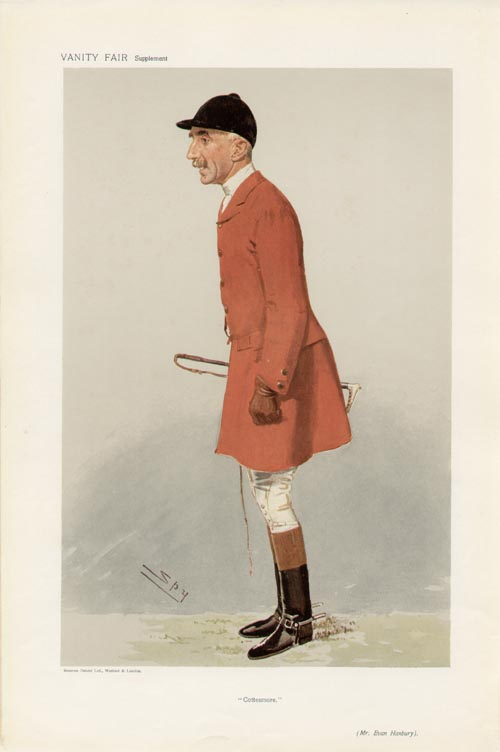
Vanity Fair print titled "Cottesmore", showing Evan Hanbury MFH, 5 December 1906

The Cottesmore Hunt's origins may be traced back to 1666 when Viscount Lowther made the long journey by a road with his own pack of foxhounds from Lowther Castle in Westmorland to Fineshade Abbey in East Northamptonshire. The Lowther family sold their pack to the Earl of Gainsborough.

From 1696 to 1779 there had been a joint arrangement between John Manners, 3rd Duke of Rutland, Master of the Belvoir, and the Earl of Gainsborough, Earl Cardigan, Lord Howe and Lord Gower, to hunt one pack on a shared basis in the huge area from Belvoir southwards into East Northamptonshire. Hounds were moved between three different kennels, including Cottesmore, each season. The Gainsborough family withdrew from this joint Hunt in 1732 and took 25 couple of hounds that began to hunt the country later known as the Cottesmore.

In 1776 Tom Noel made an agreement with Hugo Meynell, first Master of the Quorn, known as the "Father of Foxhunting". They agreed on boundaries between the Quorn and the Gainsborough pack, kennelled at Cottesmore, that enabled both packs to draw numerous coverts, including those at Owston, Launde and Tilton, nowadays well inside the Cottesmore country.

Sir William Lowther bought the pack from the Gainsboroughs and hunted the Cottesmore country from 1788 until 1802 when he became Viscount Lowther. At first he rented Stocken Hall, but later rented Cottesmore House where he kennelled the hounds, and from which the pack derived its permanent name.

Lowther made the Cottesmore Hunt more widely popular. "Earl William" and his staff wore hairy flat-topped hats, and it is believed R. S. Surtees depicted them as "The Flat Hat Hunt", with Lord Scamperdale as Master, in Mr Sponge's Sporting Tour.

The Cottesmore pack was purchased from the new Viscount Lowther in 1802 by Sir Gilbert Heathcote, 4th Baronet of Normanton Park. He employed the celebrated horse-breaker Dick Christian as whipper-in. However, after only four years, William Lowther, the new Earl Lonsdale resumed his Mastership, and continuing in office for another 36 years. Sir Richard Sutton (master of the Cottesmore Hunt from 1842 to 1847), Henley Greaves (1847–1852) and Sir John Trollope (1855–1870) provided a series of shorter Masterships up to 1870 when the Lowthers returned again. During this time a large part of the country up to Whissendine was loaned to Mr Tailby of Skeffington who, with his own pack, hunted much of the country that later became the Fernie.

Col. Henry Lowther, second son of the second Earl Lonsdale, became Master in 1870. Henry Lowther bought hounds from Tailby for £1,300. Henry lived at Asfordby before moving to Barleythorpe Hall, near Oakham, which his father purchased for him as a hunting box. Henry, who became 3rd Earl Lonsdale, built lavish kennels and stables at Barleythorpe from 1872.

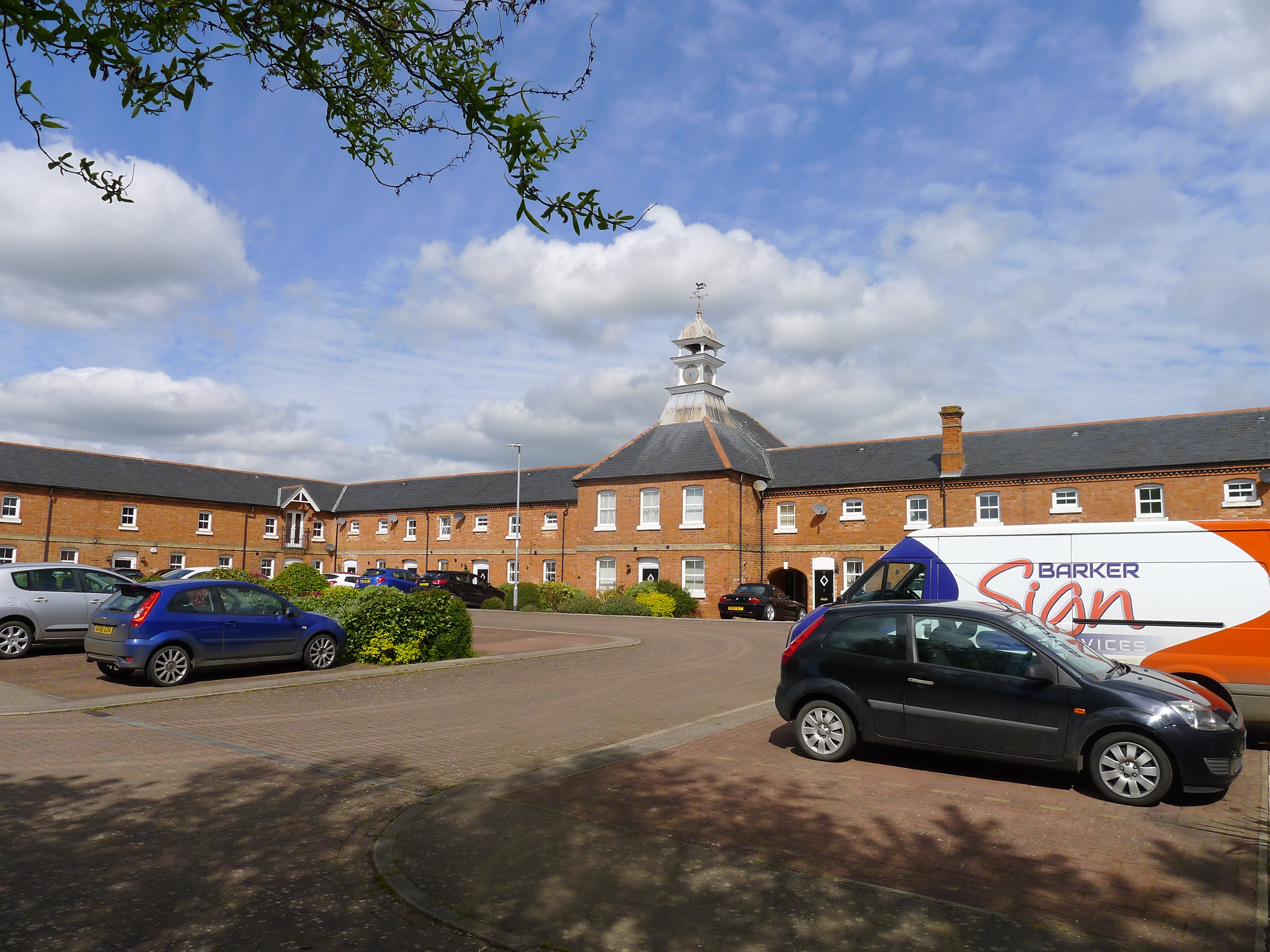
Kimball Close, a former home of the Cottesmore Hunt

New kennels and stables were built at Langham, completed in 1889. These kennels, between Oakham and Ashwell, were designed by the architect and equestrian Edmund Jeeves. The buildings were intended to accommodate 100 couple of hounds, 50 horses, and housed most of the Hunt staff of some 40 grooms and kennelmen. The hunt's kennels moved to premises in Ashwell parish in 2004 when the former kennels were developed for housing, called Kimball Close after Marcus Kimball, Baron Kimball, former MFH.

Three Hunt-class warships of the Royal Navy have been named HMS Cottesmore after the hunt.

== Country ==
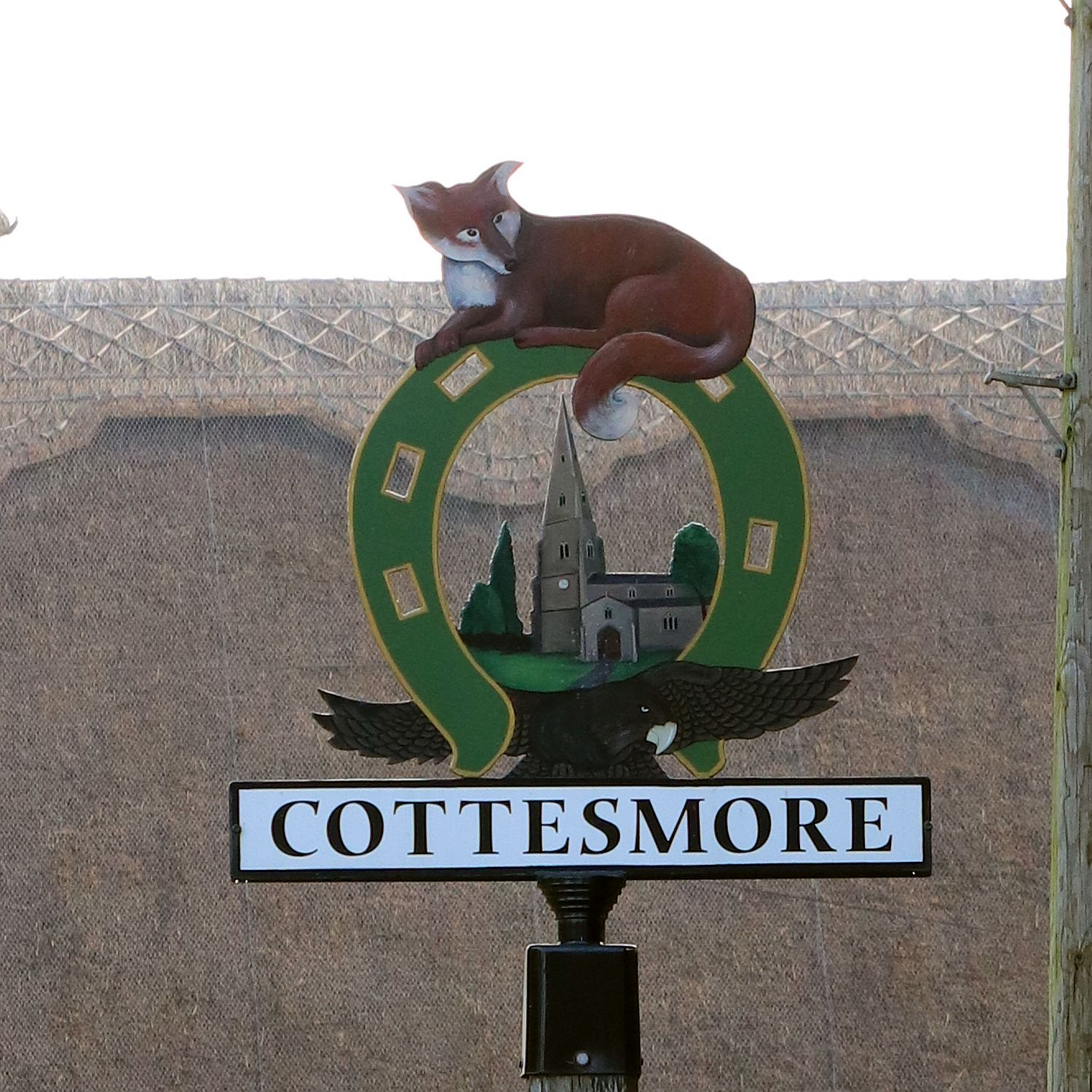
Cottesmore village sign

The Cottesmore country extends 18 miles north to south and 22 miles east to west and lies mostly in Rutland, together with some smaller areas of Leicestershire and Lincolnshire. Its country converges with that of its neighbours the Quorn and the Belvoir (Duke of Rutland's) in Melton Mowbray which in its heyday was a magnet for foxhunters worldwide and now has the UK's only foxhunting museum. Notable locations within the hunt's country in 1884 included Barleythorpe Hall, Knossington Grange, Burley Park and the town of Oakham.

== After the Hunting Act ==
Although "hunting wild mammals with a dog" was made unlawful in England and Wales by the Hunting Act 2004, which came into effect in 2005, a number of exemptions stated in Schedule 1 of the 2004 Act permit some previously unusual forms of hunting wild mammals with dogs to continue, such as "hunting... for the purpose of enabling a bird of prey to hunt the wild mammal". The Cottesmore continues to operate within the law, using a combination of laid trails and flushing the fox to a bird of prey, a golden eagle.

== 2021 pony-punching incident ==
On 6 November 2021 a member of the Cottesmore Hunt was filmed punching and kicking a pony during a hunt, with the video later being uploaded to YouTube. In January 2022 it was announced by the RSPCA that a woman had been charged with animal cruelty.

== 2022 hit-and-run incident ==
On 25 October 2022 a hunt saboteur was struck by a vehicle near Knossington.

On 15 June 2023, the driver pleaded guilty to ABH. She was sentenced to 6 months suspended for 18 months and 100 hours of unpaid work.

== 2023 trampling incident ==
On 11 February 2023, the Hertfordshire Hunt Saboteurs published a video of a participant of the hunt colliding with a saboteur whilst jumping a fence. The rider was later arrested on suspicion of attempting to cause grievous bodily harm.

== See also ==
- List of fox hunts in the United Kingdom
- English Foxhound
- HMS Cottesmore
- Cottesmore School
