= John Bury (priest) =

Canon of Windsor

John Bury (fl. 1430s – 1470s) was a Canon of Windsor from 1446 to 1472.

== Career ==
He was appointed:

- Rector of Cottesmore, Rutland until 1440
- Vicar of St Giles-without-Cripplegate 1440
- Precentor of St George's Chapel, Windsor Castle 1449–1450

He was appointed to the twelfth stall in St George's Chapel, Windsor Castle in 1446, and held the stall until 1472.

== See also ==
- Catholic Church in England
