= Algernon Burnaby =

English landowner, soldier, and Justice of the Peace

Algernon Edwyn Burnaby
- Born: 9 April 1868
- Died: 13 November 1938 (aged 70)
- Spouses: (1) Sybil Cholmondeley, dau. of Hugh Cholmondeley, 2nd Baron Delamere; (2) Minna Field
- Father: Edwyn Sherard Burnaby
- Mother: Louisa Julia Mary Dixie

Algernon Edwyn Burnaby (9 April 1868 – 13 November 1938) of Baggrave Hall, Leicestershire, was an English landowner, soldier, and Justice of the Peace, and a cousin of Queen Elizabeth, the Queen Mother. He was Master of the Quorn Hunt.

== Early life ==
A descendant of Andrew Burnaby (1732–1812), who had married the heiress of the Edwyn family of Baggrave, Burnaby was born in the parish of St George Hanover Square, Westminster, the son of Major-General Edwyn Sherard Burnaby, who went on to become a member of parliament, and of his wife Louisa Julia Mary Dixie, daughter of Sir Willoughby Wolstan Dixie, 8th Baronet. He had an older sister, Hilda Louisa. Their mother died in 1881, and their father in 1883, when Burnaby was fifteen, and he thus inherited the Baggrave estate in Leicestershire as a minor. Edwyn Burnaby's land agent, William Beeson, was sole executor of his will. Burnaby was educated at Eton College.

== Life ==
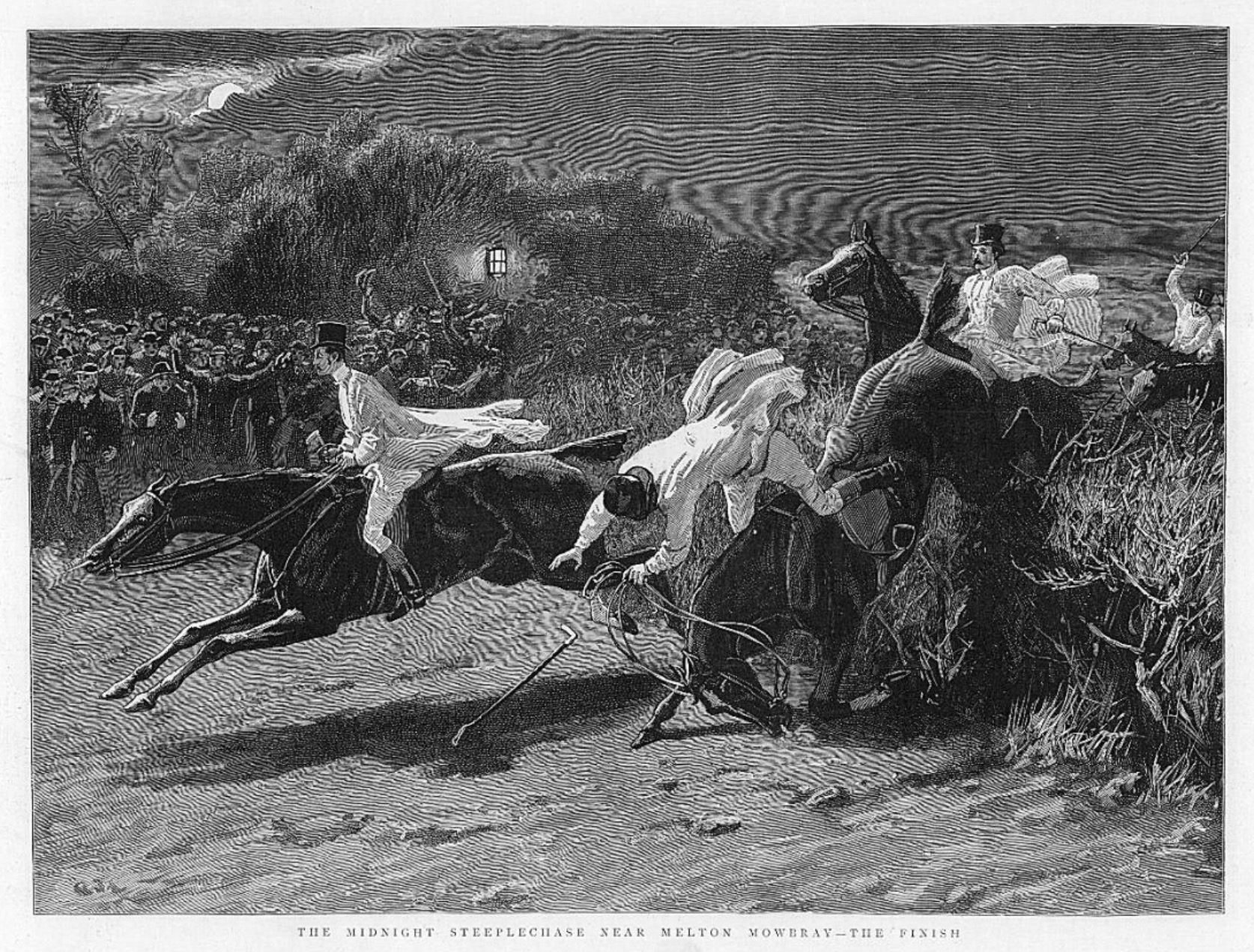
Burnaby winning the Midnight Steeplechase, 1890

After Eton, Burnaby was commissioned into the Royal Horse Guards and later served as a captain in the Westmorland and Cumberland Yeomanry and as a Major in the Territorial Force Reserve.

In 1890, Burnaby and his friend Count Elliott Zborowski together planned the Quorn Hunt's Midnight Steeplechase, a National Hunt race in the middle of the night over twelve furlongs, with the riders dressed in night shirts and top hats and the fences lit by oil lamps. Burnaby was the triumphant winner, gaining a silver cup provided by Zborowski. The race is commemorated in sporting prints.

On 13 April 1896, Burnaby married Sybil Cholmondeley, only daughter of Hugh Cholmondeley, 2nd Baron Delamere and Augusta Emily Seymour, herself a daughter of Sir George Hamilton Seymour. They were divorced in 1902, having had one son, Hugh Edwyn Burnaby, born at Westminster in 1897. On 18 July 1908, at York Harbor, Maine, Burnaby married secondly Minna Field, a daughter of a rich American, Henry Field, of Chicago, and a niece of Marshall Field. He thus gained a young step-son, Henry Field. Sybil Burnaby died on 26 May 1911, aged 39, two weeks after falling out of a window at home in Wilton Place and suffering severe injuries. At an inquest, the coroner found that the fall was purely accidental.

Burnaby's aunt Louisa Burnaby (1832–1918) married Charles Cavendish-Bentinck and was the mother of Cecilia Bowes-Lyon, Countess of Strathmore and Kinghorne, grandmother of Queen Elizabeth II.

Burnaby was Master of the Quorn Hunt from 1912 to 1932. A Great Depression began in 1929, and subscriptions to the hunt began to fall. Burnaby then recruited Sir Harold Nutting, "newly rich from bottling Guinness", as joint Master, and quipped "We don't want your personality, we want your purse!" Jane Ridley has estimated that during the following ten years Nutting spent about £15,000 a year on the Quorn, equivalent to £847,702 in 2025.

Burnaby died on 13 November 1938. His son and heir, Hugh Edwyn Burnaby, sold the Baggrave Hall estate in 1939 and settled in Oxfordshire. His step-mother, Burnaby's second wife, settled in Coconut Grove, Florida, and died there in May 1952.

Edward, Prince of Wales, rode with the Quorn in his youth and recalled Burnaby in his memoirs of 1951:

Of all the outstanding hunting personalities of the Leicestershire of those days, I shall only pause to mention one, the late Major Algernon Burnaby, the Squire of Baggrave Hall and a famous master of the Quorn Hunt. With a weather-beaten complexion, a hawklike nose, piercing eyes, and the intellect of a statesman, Algy Burnaby kept his hard-riding field under perfect control by means of an unrivalled combination of polished wit and sarcasm. If, for example, some of the ladies rode too close to hounds in their eagerness to keep ahead of each other, his cry of "Hold hard, all the pretty women; the others can go on" would stop them in their tracks. Or, if a thrusting young man jumped a fence where the hounds had checked to pick up the lost scent, and I was within earshot, Algy would upbraid him with some such caustic remark as, "Come back, young feller. Who the hell do you think you are, the Prince of Wales?"

Hugh Edwyn Burnaby died in December 1950, leaving a widow, Vilma Dorothea Ludourka Todenhagen, whom he had married in 1923, and a substantial fortune. Ludourka Burnaby lived until 1982. Burnaby's sister Hilda died unmarried in August 1953, aged 87. Burnaby's step-son Henry Field became a significant anthropologist and died in Florida in 1986.
