= HMS Quorn =

Three ships of the Royal Navy have been named HMS Quorn, all named after the Quorn Hunt.

- HMS Quorn (1916), launched in 1916, was a Hunt-class minesweeper that served in the First World War and was sold in 1922.
- HMS Quorn (L66), launched in 1940, was a Hunt-class destroyer sunk by the Germans in 1944.
- HMS Quorn (M41), launched in 1988, was a Hunt-class mine countermeasures vessel.
