= John Ferneley =

English painter

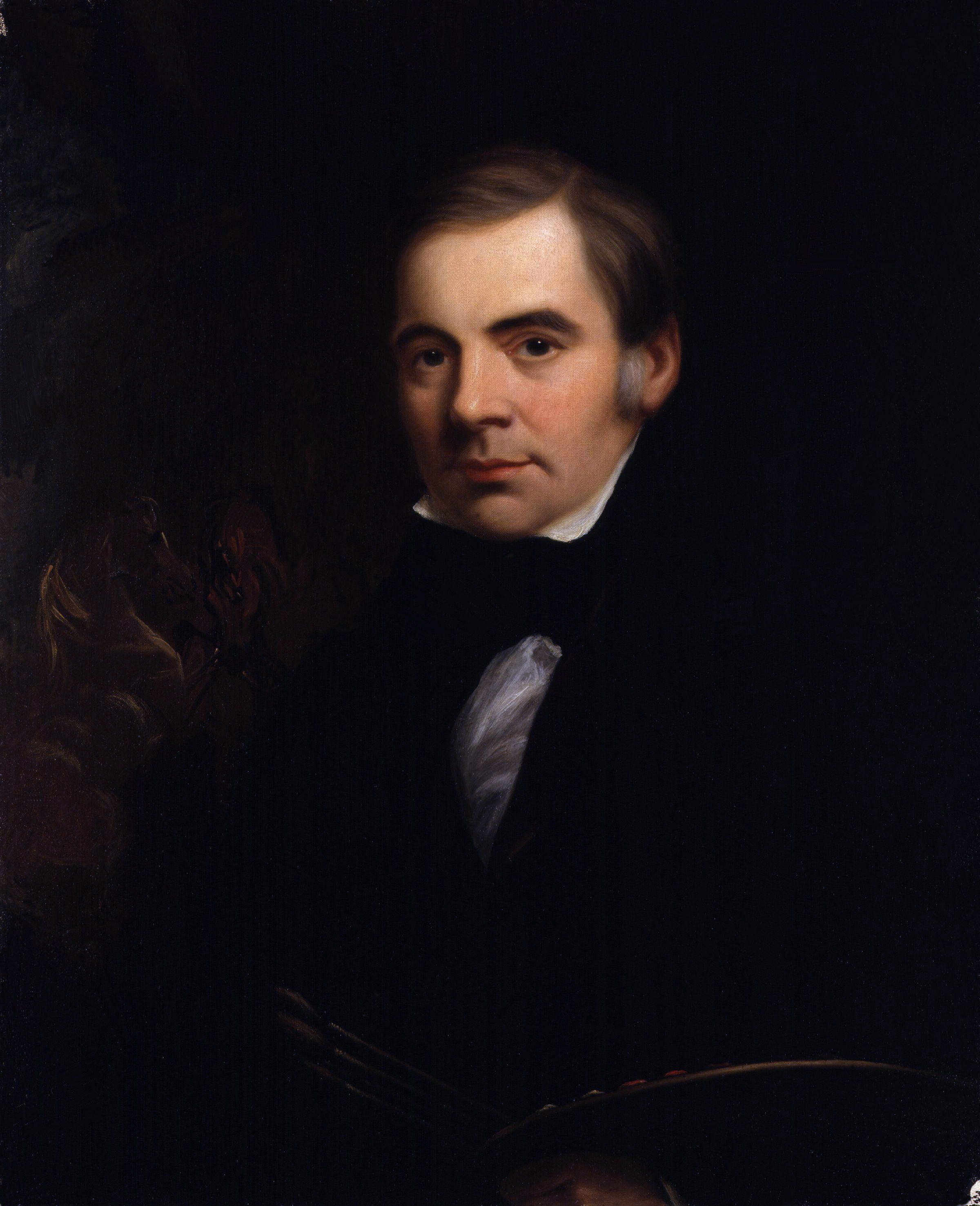
John Ferneley (1838) by Henry Johnson

John E. Ferneley (18 May 1782 Thrussington, Leicestershire – 1860 Melton Mowbray, Leicestershire), was an English painter who specialised in portraying sporting horses and hunting scenes. Although his rendition of horses was stylised, he is regarded as one of the great British equine artists, second perhaps only to George Stubbs.

== Early life and education ==
At first apprenticed until 1801 to his father, who was a master wheelwright, he was encouraged to take up painting by John Manners, 5th Duke of Rutland. Accordingly, he moved to London and studied under the sporting artist Benjamin Marshall. While training with Marshall he joined the Royal Academy School.

== Career ==
His work was exhibited between 1806 and 1853 at the Royal Academy. He traveled extensively in Ireland from 1806 to 1809, but returned to England to marry, and started working from Melton Mowbray. Here he built his studio and later a house, Elgin Lodge, on the Scalford Rd. Melton Mowbray was fast becoming a watering hole for the sporting fraternity and the place where modern fox-hunting developed in the late eighteenth century. Hugo Meynell, a wealthy local bred his hounds to keep up with the horses and riders in their pursuit over hedges and ditches. At this time riders began wearing the scarlet jackets which were to become traditional.

Ferneley's paintings depicted hunting when it was extremely fashionable. Good horses sold quite readily for 200 guineas and most riders had at least ten in their stables. His work became much sought after, his patrons including many Royals and personalities such as Beau Brummel and the Count d'Orsay. Ferneley routinely was commissioned to paint the famous Quorn, Belvoir, and Cottesmore hunts. The members all contributed to the painter's fee and then drew lots to determine the winner. Ferneley specialised in painting "scurries", panoramic paintings showing a sequence of events. He befriended Sir Francis Grant and helped him with the painting of horses while Grant in return helped with figure painting. In this way they collaborated on a number of paintings. Ferneley's signature was done very delicately with a pin head in the wet paint and often hidden on a fence, stable door or in an unexpected corner of the painting. His signature is easily differentiated from that of his son, John Jr, who normally signed heavily in black.

Between 1810 and 1812 he visited Ireland twice more, carrying out a great number of commissioned paintings for wealthy Irish patrons. He fathered six children with his first wife (who died in 1836) - three of whom also became painters.

Ferneley kept a set of account books dating between 1807 and 1860; the detailed notes providing useful material for later historians.

John Ferneley College in Melton Mowbray, is named after him.

== Death ==
Ferneley died in 1860 in Melton Mowbray, Leicestershire.

== Gallery ==
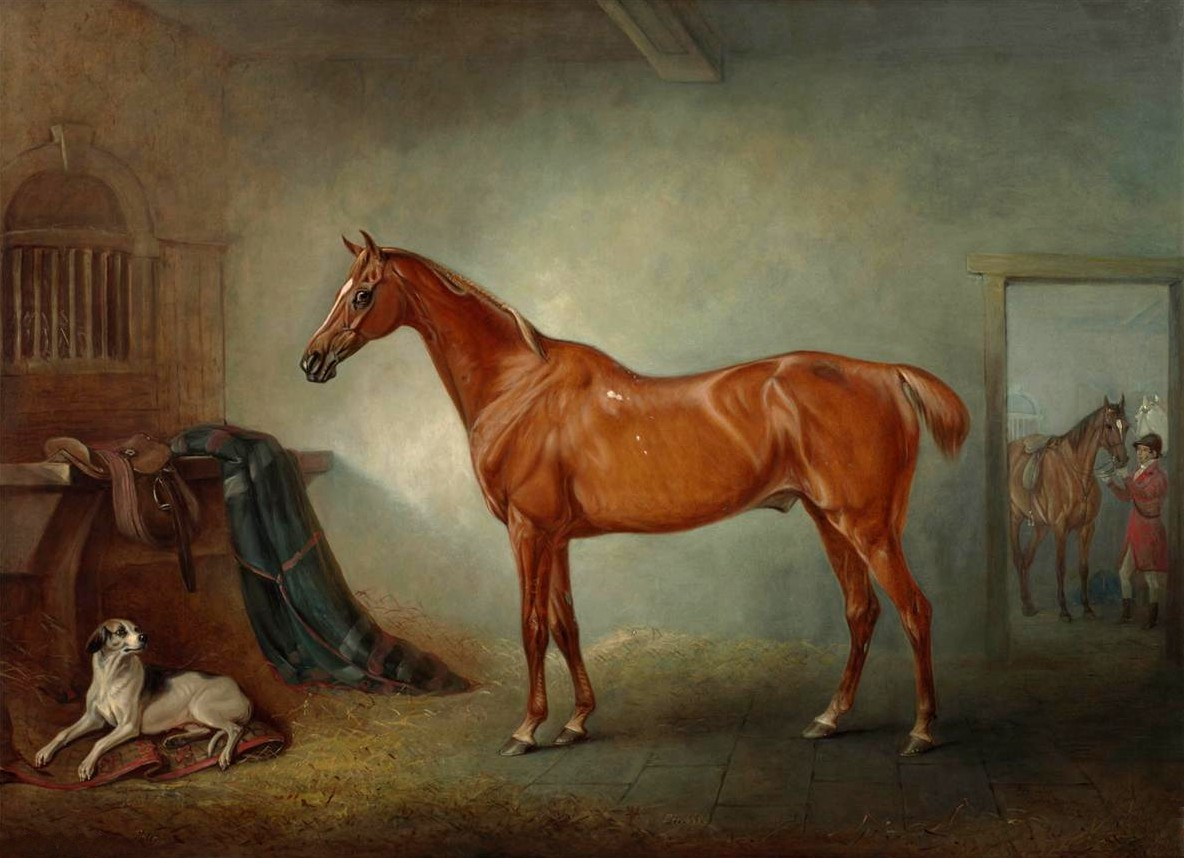
Lord Henry Bentinck's chestnut hunter 'Firebird'

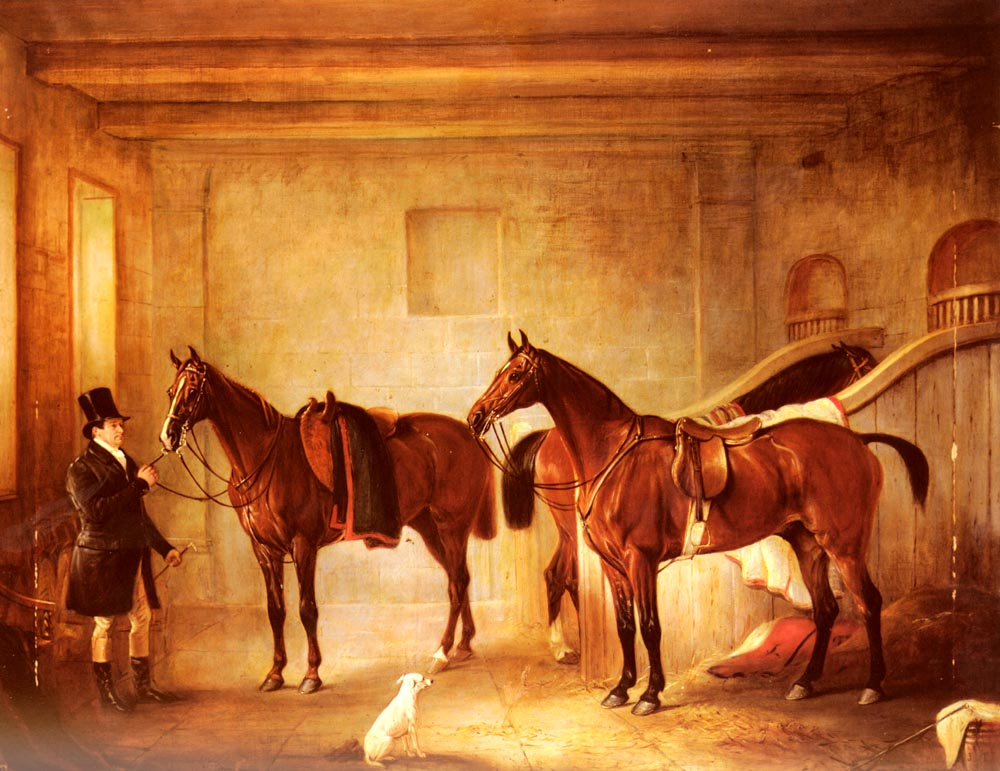
Sir John Thorold's 'Bay Hunters With Their Groom'

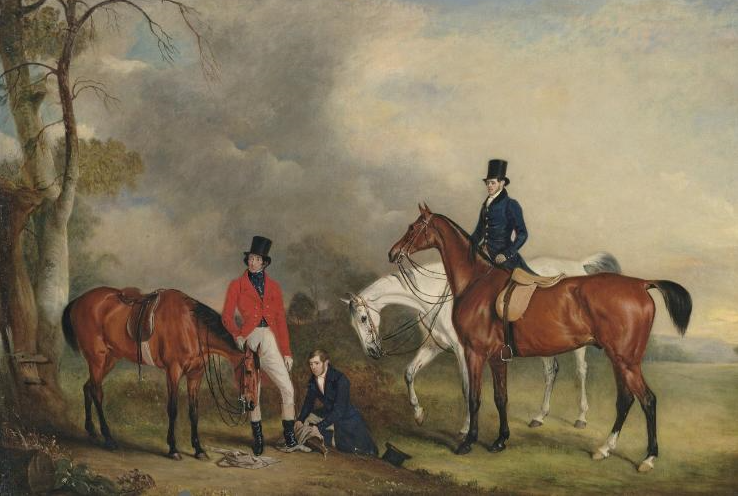
James Ogilvie Fairlie with his grooms and the three principal steeplechasers in his stables

== Bibliography ==
- The Melton Mowbray of John Ferneley by Major Guy Paget
- The Account Books of John Ferneley by Major Guy Paget
