= John Ferneley College =

Location
- Scalford Road; Melton Mowbray, Leicestershire, LE13 1LH; England; 52.7825°N 0.8883°W

Information
- Type: Academy
- Motto: Leave no one behind
- Trust: Mowbray Education Trust
- Department for Education URN: 137617 Tables
- Ofsted: Reports
- Head teacher: Terry Claridge
- Gender: Mixed
- Age: 11 to 16
- Enrolment: 1,189 as of April 2024
- Colours: Black, red and white
- Website: http://www.johnferneley.org

John Ferneley College is a mixed secondary school in Melton Mowbray in the English county of Leicestershire. The school educates pupils aged 11 to 16 and is part of Mowbray Education Trust, a multi-academy trust serving Melton Mowbray and the surrounding area. The school is named after John Ferneley (1782-1860), the renowned equine painter associated with Melton Mowbray and who is regarded as one of the great British equine artists. Formerly a community school maintained by Leicestershire County Council, John Ferneley College converted to academy status in November 2011. The academy was originally established as the John Ferneley College Academy Trust and subsequently expanded to include a number of schools across the local area. In 2014, the Trust adopted the name Mowbray Education Trust.

The school continues to serve Melton Mowbray and the surrounding communities and coordinates admissions through the local authority admissions process.

== Facilities ==
The school is located on Scalford Road in Melton Mowbray. A new main teaching building was opened in 2010, followed by the opening of the Enrichment Centre in 2012. In 2019, the college expanded its facilities with the development of the Culture Zone, providing additional teaching accommodation and specialist learning spaces.

In August 2023, the Futures Building was opened, including additional classrooms, computer suites and a library.

== Learning Zones ==
The college operates a distinct internal structure where subject areas are grouped together into "learning zones". There are five learning zones, each one centred around a central foyer known as a "breakout area". The breakout areas are multi-use areas, being used as classrooms, dining areas and social spaces.

The learning zones are:

- Communication Zone: English, Media Studies
- Culture Zone: Geography and History
- Discovery Zone: Science, Physics, Biology, Chemistry
- Enterprise Zone: Business Studies, Computer Science, DT (Design Technology), Food Tech, personal development
- Performance Zone: Art, Dance, Drama, Music, Physical Education
- Enrichment Building: Mathematics
- MFL (modern foreign languages) Block: French, Spanish, German
- Futures Building: Computer Science, Business Studies, Health and Social Care, Child Development

== Governance ==
John Ferneley College is part of Mowbray Education Trust, a multi-academy trust headquartered at Pera Business Park in Melton Mowbray.

As of 2026, the Trust comprises John Ferneley College, Iveshead School, Ab Kettleby Primary School, Brownlow Primary School, Buckminster Primary School, Sherard Primary School, Somerby Primary School, The Grove Primary School and Oasis Pre-School and Retreat.

Strategic oversight is provided by the Trust Board. The Chief Executive Officer of Mowbray Education Trust is Louise Lee.

== Leadership ==
Since April 2024, the Headteacher of John Ferneley College has been Terry Claridge.

== Curriculum ==
The school provides secondary education for pupils aged 11 to 16 and offers a broad and balanced curriculum across a range of academic and vocational subjects.

Pupils study a wide range of subjects at Key Stage 3 and Key Stage 4 and have access to enrichment opportunities, educational visits, extracurricular activities and careers education designed to support their personal development and preparation for future pathways.

== Ofsted ==
Ofsted inspected John Ferneley College on 22nd and 23rd September 2026. The school met the 'Expected Standard' in all six areas assessed: achievement; attendance and behaviour, curriculum and teaching; inclusion; leadership and governance; and personal development and wellbeing. Safeguarding standards were also met.

Inspectors described John Ferneley College as a 'welcoming, friendly and inclusive school' where pupils felt happy and safe. They recognised positive relationships between staff and pupils and found lessons to be purposeful. The report highlighted improvements in teaching, behaviour and attendance, with suspensions falling substantially and persistent and severe absence significantly reduced.

Inspectors also recognised improvements in inclusion, careers education and pastoral support. Pupils increasingly felt listened to, while the majority of parents and carers who contributed their views welcomed the changes. The report noted that leaders had established greater stability in leadership, staffing and school finances, supporting the school's continued improvement.
