= Nutting baronets =

Baronetcy in the Baronetage of the United Kingdom

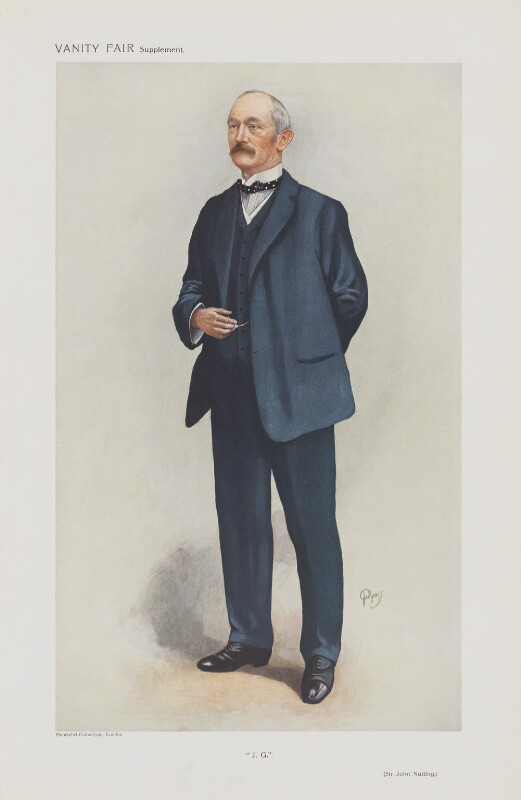
John Gardner Nutting ("JG"), caricature by Pry in Vanity Fair, 1910.

The Nutting Baronetcy, of St Helens in Booterstown in the County of Dublin, is a title in the Baronetage of the United Kingdom. It was created on 12 January 1903 for John Nutting. He was Chairman of the firm E and J Burke Ltd and a Justice of the Peace, Deputy Lieutenant and High Sheriff for County Dublin.

In 1930, Algernon Burnaby, Master of the Quorn Hunt, recruited Sir Harold Nutting, second Baronet, "newly rich from bottling Guinness", as joint Master, and quipped "We don't want your personality, we want your purse!" Jane Ridley has estimated that during the following ten years Nutting spent about £15,000 a year on the Quorn.

The third Baronet was a Conservative politician and served under Winston Churchill and Anthony Eden as Joint Parliamentary Under-Secretary of State for Foreign Affairs and as Minister of State for Foreign Affairs. As of 2023 the title is held by his son, the fourth Baronet, who succeeded in 1999.

== Nutting baronets, of St Helens (1903) ==
- Sir John Gardiner Nutting, 1st Baronet (1852–1918)
- Sir Harold Stansmore Nutting, 2nd Baronet (1882–1972)
- Sir (Harold) Anthony Nutting, 3rd Baronet (1920–1999)
- Sir John Grenfell Nutting, 4th Baronet, KC (born 1942)

The heir apparent is the present holder's only son James Edward Sebastian Nutting (born 1977).

== Arms ==
Coat of arms of Nutting baronets

Notes
Granted 31 August 1898 by Sir Arthur Edward Vicars, Ulster King of Arms.
Crest
A demi-gryphon segreant Or enclosed between two oak branches Proper.
Escutcheon
Chevronny of six Gules and Vert three gryphons segreant Or on a chief of the last as many oak branches slipped Proper.
Motto
Mors Potior Macula

Baronetage of the United Kingdom
Preceded by Arthur baronets	Nutting baronets of St Helens; 12 January 1903	Succeeded by Steel baronets
