= Cottesmore, Rutland =

Village and civil parish in Rutland, England

Coordinates: 52.71°N 0.66°W

Cottesmore
- Village and Civil Parish
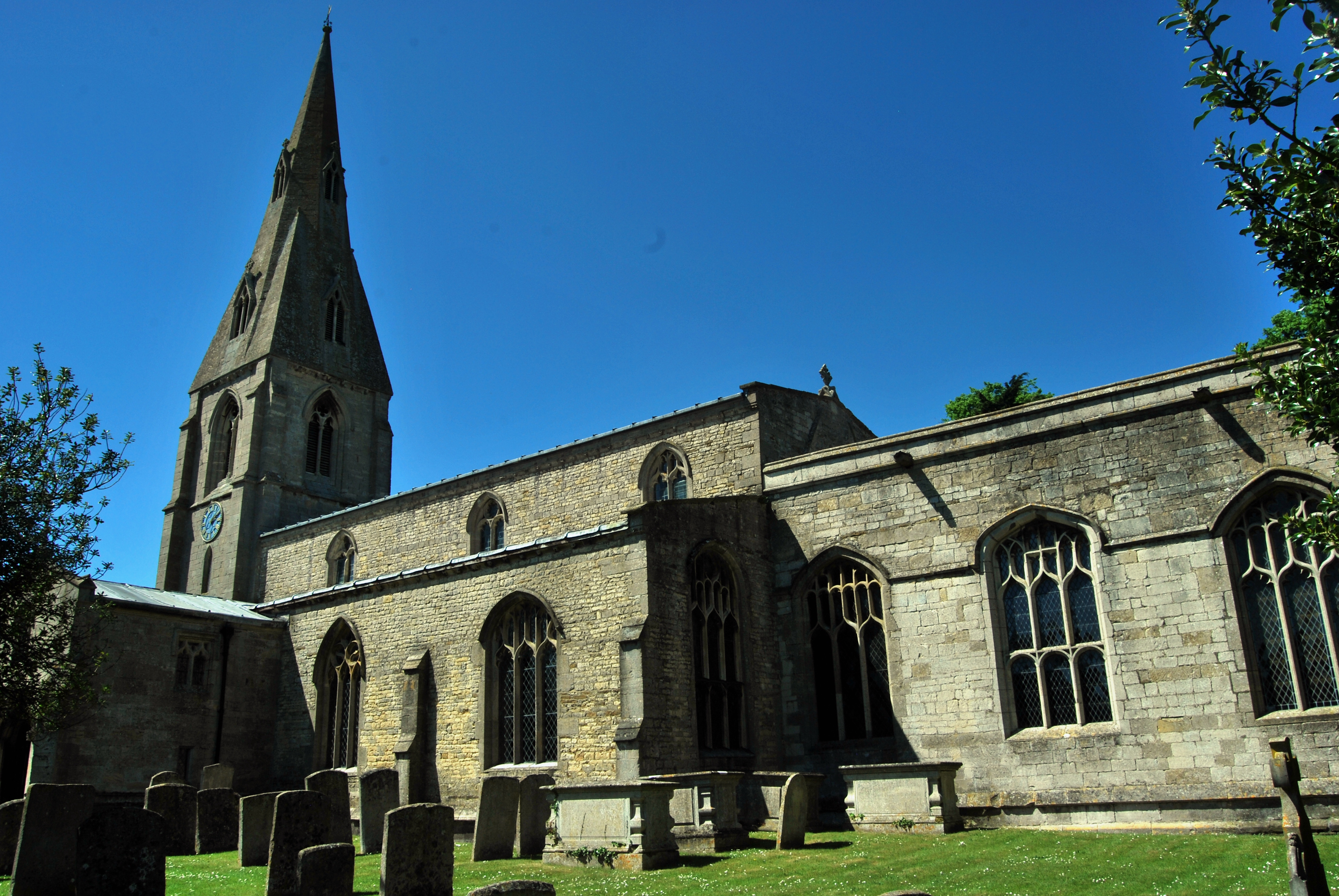
- St Nicholas' Church, Cottesmore

- Location within Rutland
- Area: 3.91 sq mi (10.1 km^{2})
- Population: 2,062 Including Barrow, Rutland. 2011 Census
  - Density: 596/sq mi (230/km^{2})
- OS grid reference: SK904136
  - London: 87 miles (140 km) SSE
- Unitary authority: Rutland
- Shire county: Rutland
- Ceremonial county: Rutland
- Region: East Midlands
- Country: England
- Sovereign state: United Kingdom
- Post town: OAKHAM
- Postcode district: LE15
- Dialling code: 01572
- Police: Leicestershire
- Fire: Leicestershire
- Ambulance: East Midlands
- UK Parliament: Rutland and Stamford
- Website: https://www.cottesmoreparishcouncil.org.uk/

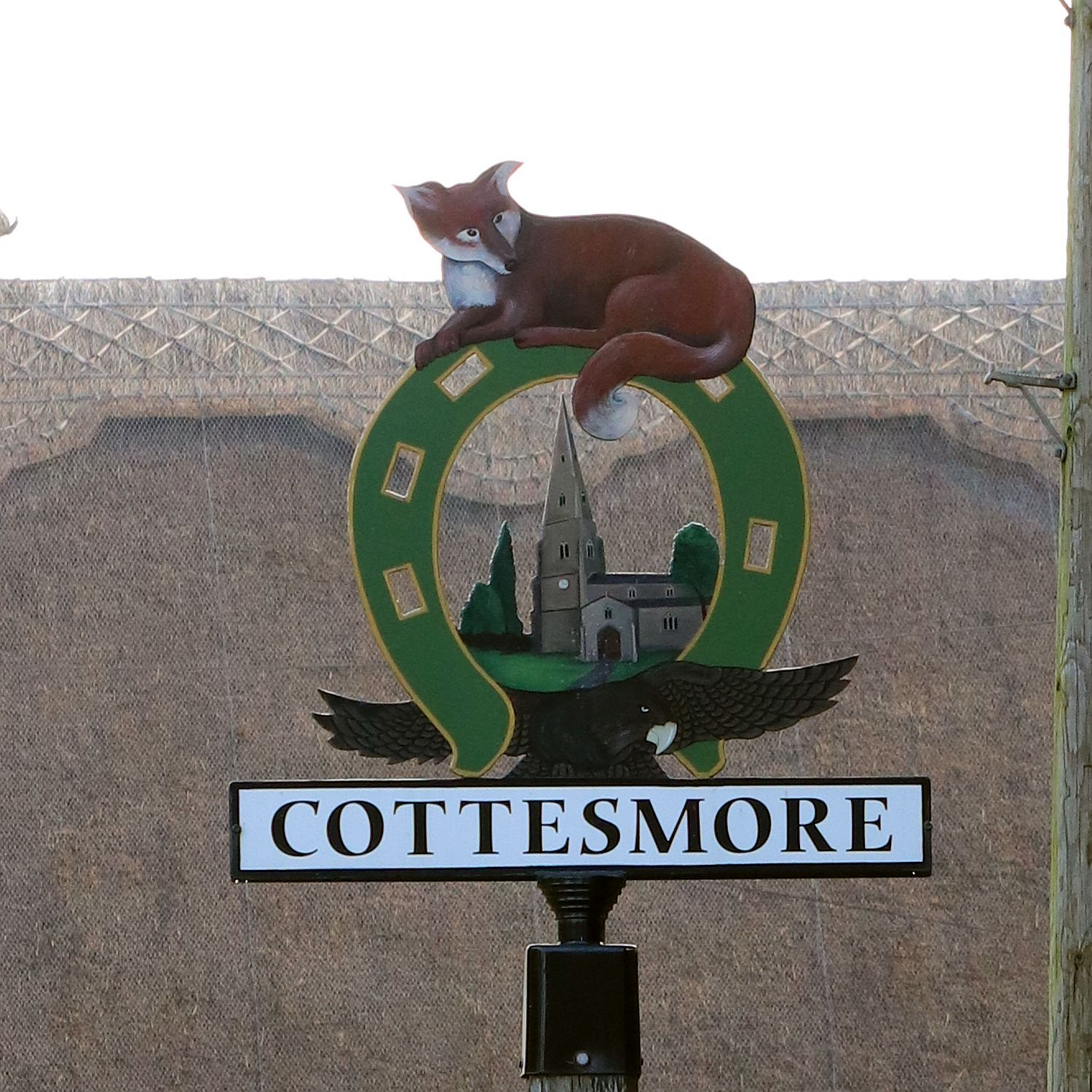
Village sign in Cottesmore

Cottesmore (often pronounced Cotts'more) is a village and civil parish in the north of the county of Rutland in the East Midlands of England. In terms of population it is the largest village in Rutland, and the third-largest settlement after Oakham and Uppingham. This is due in part to the presence of Kendrew Barracks (formerly RAF Cottesmore).

The village's name means 'moor of Cott'.

== History ==
At the time of Edward the Confessor (mid 11th century), "Manors Cottesmore" was held, together with Greetham, by Saxon called Goda. Goda held 12 carucates of land, three of which were held in tax to the Danegeld. The King held three carucates in demesne and three socmen with 40 villeins and six bordarii held 20 carucates. Of the land held by the manor, one Goisfridus held half a carucate; he had one plough and eight villeins. Cottesmore also had 40 acres (160,000 m^{2}) of meadow and a wood measuring a mile in length by seven furlongs in breadth.

St Nicholas' Church, Cottesmore is a Grade II* listed building. The north aisle forms a RAF chapel, dedicated in 1949 to those who gave their lives while serving at RAF Cottesmore. A stained glass window was erected to the memory of Major General George Williams Knox CB (1838–1894). The colours of the 1st Battalion Scots Guards were gifted to the church by his widow and hang in the nave. The Cottesmore Benefice is part of the North Rutland Churches group.

There are two primary schools in the parish: St Nicholas C of E (Aided) Primary School is in the village and Cottesmore Academy is on the military base.

The Cottesmore Hunt takes its name from the village (although the kennels are not now in the parish). Sir William Lowther, 1st Earl of Lonsdale brought the foxhounds he had bought from Thomas Noel to Cottesmore in 1740.

Three ships of the Royal Navy have been named HMS Cottesmore after the Cottesmore hunt. Prince Andrew, Duke of York commanded the minesweeper HMS Cottesmore (M32) from April 1993 until November 1994 and visited the village with members of his crew.

== See also ==
- Alfred Cattell, rugby international for Wales born in Cottesmore
- Cottesmore School, a prep school in Sussex, England, founded by Geoffrey Davison Brown who was born in the village
- Janet Erskine Stuart, Roman Catholic nun and educator, daughter of the rector
