= HMS Cottesmore =

Three ships of the Royal Navy have been named HMS Cottesmore after the Cottesmore hunt:

- The first HMS Cottesmore (1917), launched in 1917, was a Hunt-class minesweeper. She served in World War I and was paid off and sold in 1919.
- The second HMS Cottesmore (L78), launched in 1940, was a Hunt-class destroyer. She served in World War II, was sold to the Egyptian Navy in 1950 being renamed Port Said, and served into the 1980s as a training ship.
- The third HMS Cottesmore (M32), launched in 1982 and decommissioned in 2005, was a mine countermeasures vessel of another Hunt class. Prince Andrew, Duke of York commanded HMS Cottesmore from April 1993 until November 1994.
