= Hunt-class =

Hunt-class may refer to:

- Hunt-class minesweeper (1916)
- Hunt-class destroyer (built 1939–1943)
- Hunt-class mine countermeasures vessel (built 1978–1988)
