= Regulation Colours =

Standard colours of armed forces of countries of the Commonwealth of Nations

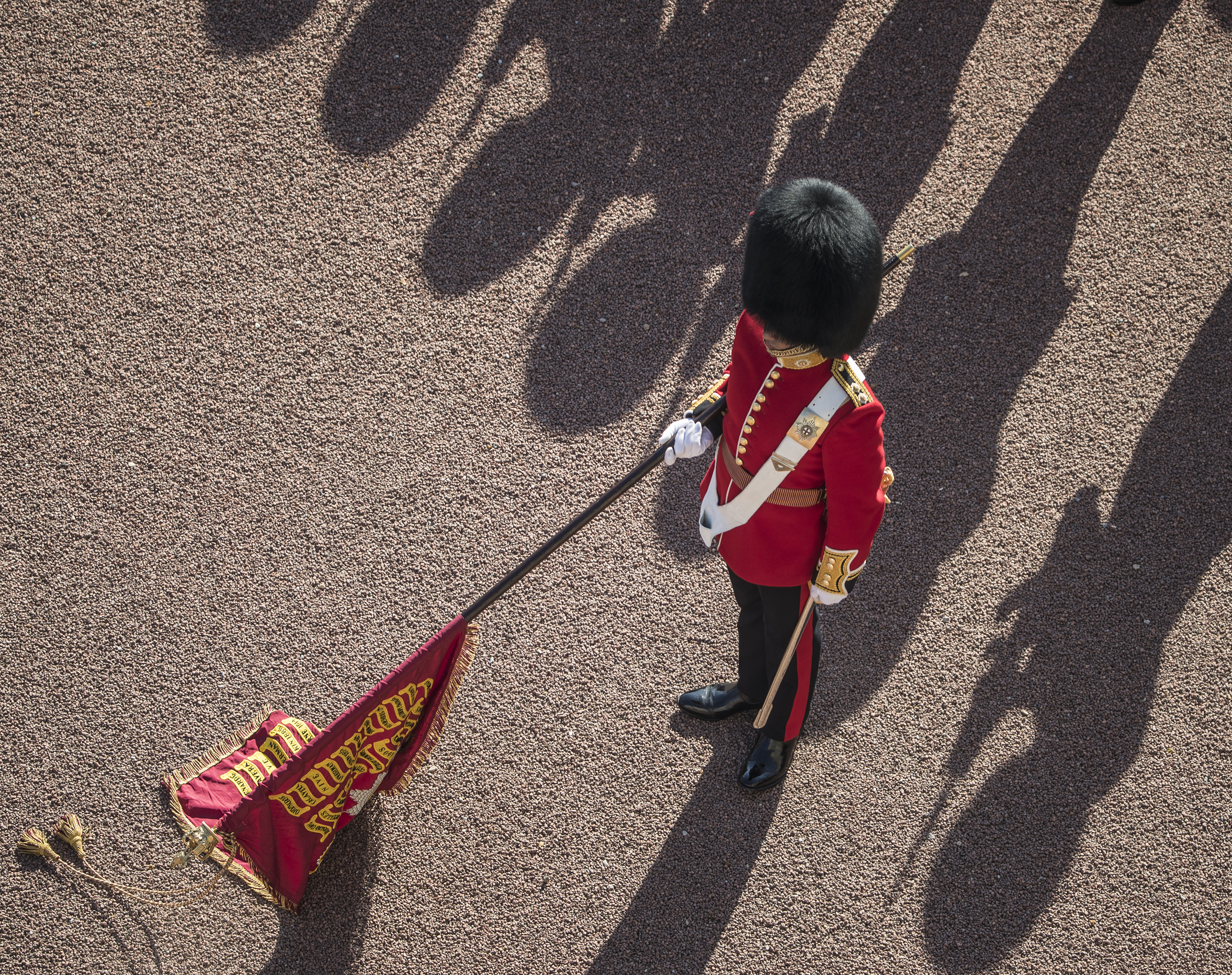
The Queen's colour of the Coldstream Guards in 2018.

The Regulation Colours are the standard colours used in the armed forces of the countries of the Commonwealth of Nations.

== British Armed Forces colours ==
British Armed Forces units usually carry two Regulation Colours: the Regulation King's Colour and Regulation Regimental Colour. These are often referred to as the standard or ensign.

Colours are the identifying battle flags carried by military regiments to show where their respective soldiers should rally in battle. Originally these were 6 feet 6 inches (198 cm) × 6 feet (183 cm) in size, though have now been reduced to 3 feet 9 inches (114 cm) × 3 feet (91 cm), as regiments no longer carry their colours on the battlefield.

=== British Army ===
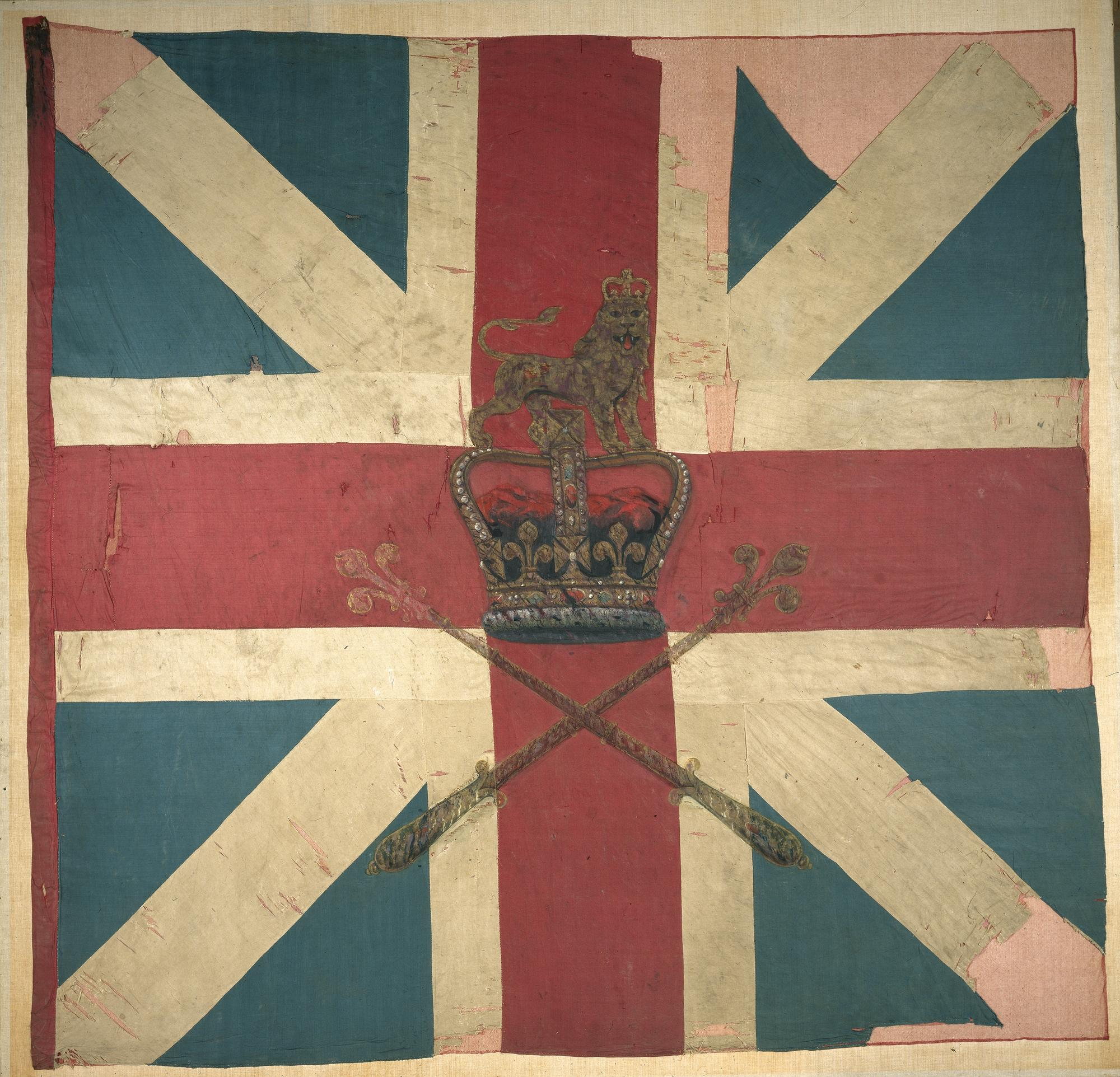
The Kings's colour of Barrell's Regiment of Foot that was carried at the Battle of Culloden in 1746. National Museum of Scotland, accession number M.1931.299.2

Prior to 1743, each infantry regiment of the British Army was responsible for the design and quantity of standards carried, often with each company having its own design. In that year King George II issued a royal warrant to require each regiment to have, as their first colour, the King's colour. It was also to consist of the Union Jack throughout, as a symbol of royal allegiance. The second colour was to be the colour of the facings (uniform linings) of each regiment, with the Union flag in the upper canton. When regiments had red or white facings, this was to be replaced by the red cross of St George on a white background. Regiments with "Royal" designation or named after the members of the royal family, regardless of facings, used royal blue regimental colours (plus the optional Union Jack canton), Irish regiments green facings. A second royal warrant was issued in 1747, requiring the regimental number to be displayed on the colours. As many regiments at that time were known by the name of the regimental colonel instead of a number, this requirement was often ignored. On 1 July 1751 a third royal warrant was issued stating "No Colonel is to put his Arms, Crest, Device, or Livery on any part of the Appointments of the Regiment under his Command." Company colours were phased out altogether, with the battalion colours of the regiment using the designs issued being the only sanctioned ones used.

Over time, these colours have evolved to include the battle honours awarded to each regiment, though these have also been limited.

The last British Army regiment to carry its regimental colours into battle was the 58th (Rutlandshire) Regiment of Foot in January 1881 at the Battle of Laing's Nek during the First Boer War.

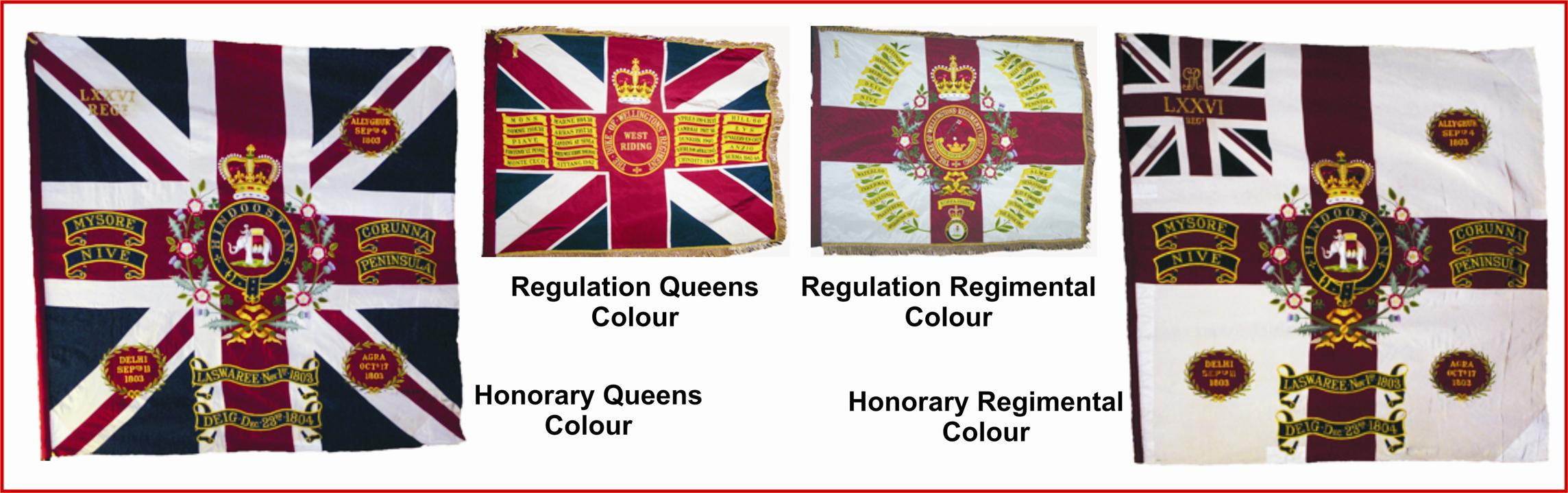
Colours of the Duke of Wellington's Regiment

Two British regiments carry more than two colours on parade. The Royal Yorkshire Regiment, who carry four colours. The second pair consists of a stand of honorary battle flags, which are the original size of 6 ft 6 in × 6 ft. These honorary colours, 'King's Honorary Colour' and 'Regimental Honorary Colour,' were originally awarded to the 76th Regiment of Foot, which later became the 2nd Battalion of the Duke of Wellington's (West Riding Regiment) in 1808, by the Honorable East India Company for their distinguished services during the Battle of Ally Ghur and again at Delhi between 1802 and 1804. In 1948 the 1st and 2nd Battalions merged and retained the Honorary Colours. In 2006 the Duke of Wellington's Regiment merged with the Prince of Wales's Own Regiment of Yorkshire and the Green Howards to form the 'Yorkshire Regiment (14th/15th, 19th and 33rd/76th Foot)'. The Honourable Artillery Company has both a stand of colours (king's and regimental) and guns. The latter are also regarded as colours and accorded the same compliments just as the Royal Artillery regard their guns as their colours.

Rifle regiments (today The Rifles) plus the Brigade of Gurkhas do not use colours at all owing to their role. The latter, however, carries the Queen's Truncheon awarded in 1857 instead.

==== Guards Division ====
Unlike the rest of the Army, all five Foot Guards infantry regiments sport a different variant pattern.

Given the status of the guards regiments as units under royal patronage and for the defence of the British Royal Family and facilities belonging to them, the design of the colours are:

- Queen's/King's Colour - crimson with the regimental insignia, arms and battle honours (Union Flag canton on the colours of any additional battalions)
- Regimental Colours - Union Flag with regimental insignia and any battle honours

Unlike most infantry regiments, all five carry all battle honours on both colours.

Until the 1820s, the Guards infantry carried company colours alongside the regimental battalion colours.

A third colour, the Guards State Colour, is unique to the Grenadier, Coldstream, and Scots Guards, and only used when the monarch is present. Their design is scarlet with the regimental insignia and arms at the centre with the Royal Cypher at the corners. No battle honours are present.

== See also ==
- Military colours, standards and guidons
