= Edward Pope =

Edward Pope may refer to:

- Eddie Pope (born 1973), American soccer player
- Edward Pope (priest) (died 1671), Archdeacon of Gloucester
- Edward Brian Pope (1911–2011), English rugby player
