= George Savage =

George Savage may refer to:

- George Savage (Scottish footballer), Scottish footballer
- George Savage (footballer, born 1895) (1895–1968), English footballer
- George Savage (MP) (1636–1683), member of parliament for Wareham, 1679–1683
- George Savage (physician) (1842–1921), British physician
- George Savage (politician) (1941–2014), member of Northern Ireland Assembly
- George Savage (priest) (died 1602), Anglican priest
