= Tickencote Marsh =

Protected area in Rutland, England

Coordinates: 52.671°N 0.549°W

- Site of Special Scientific Interest
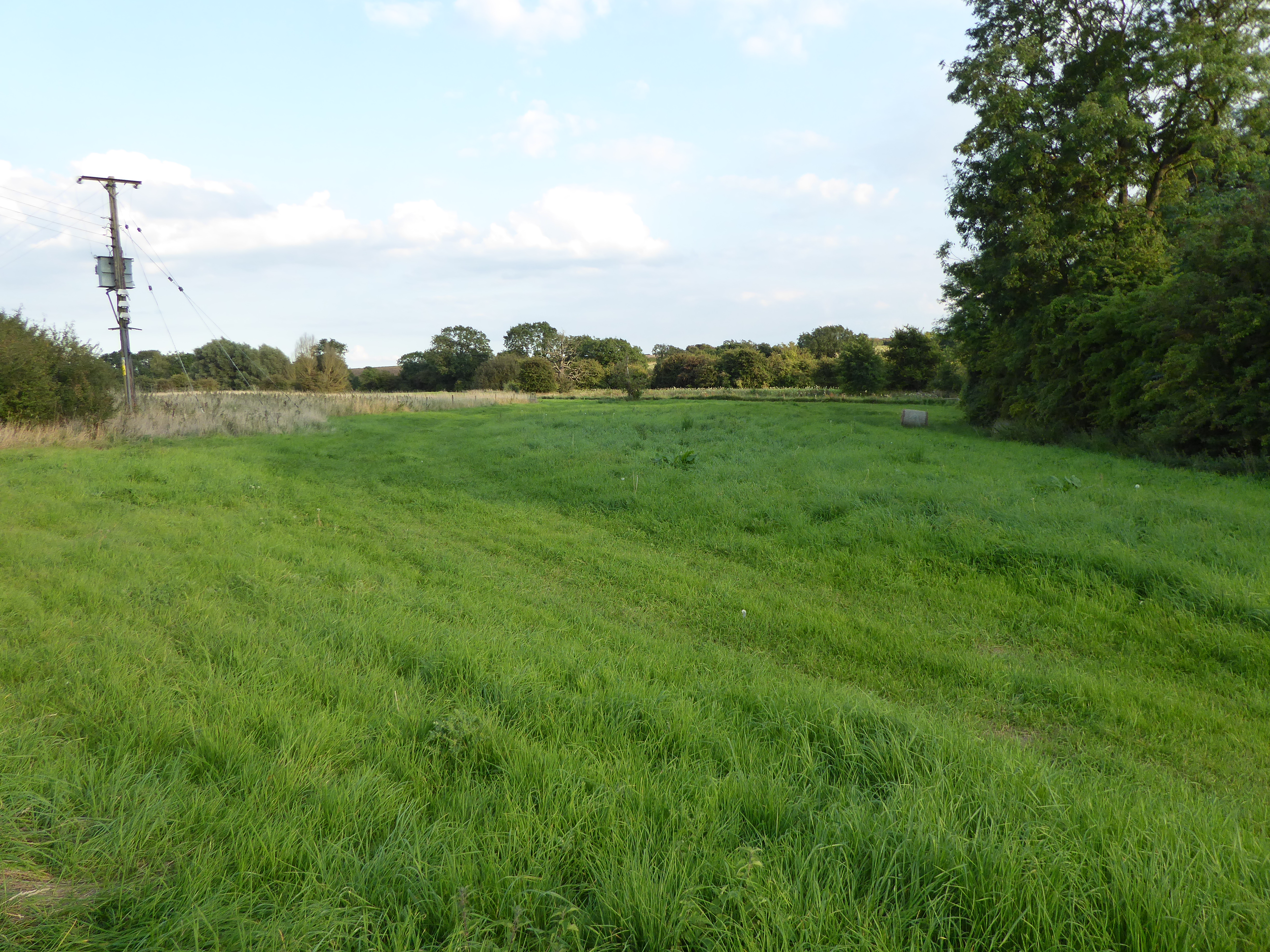
- Location of Tickencote Marsh.
- Area of search: Rutland, England
- Grid reference: SK 982 091
- Interest: Biological
- Area: 3.0 hectares
- Notification date: 1987
- Location map: Magic Map

Tickencote Marsh is a three hectare biological Site of Special Scientific Interest west of Tickencote and Great Casterton in Rutland.

This site in the valley of the River Gwash is a base-rich grazing marsh, a habitat which is becoming increasingly rare as a result of drainage and a decline in grazing. Common flora include lesser pond-sedge, marsh horsetail and jointed rush.

The site is private land with no public access.
