= Hugh Robinson =

Hugh Robinson may refer to:

- Hugh Robinson (aviator) (1881–1963), American aviation pioneer
- Hugh Robinson (painter) (1756–1796), British painter
- Hugh G. Robinson, first African American general officer in the United States Army Corps of Engineers
- Hugh Robinson (priest), Anglican priest
- Hugh Malcolm Robinson (1857–1933), British factory inspector
