= John Timbrill =

John Timbrill, D.D. (1773 in Pershore – 1864 in Gloucester) was Archdeacon of Gloucester from 14 May 1825 until his death.

Sheringham was educated at Worcester College, Oxford. He held incumbencies at Beckford with Ashton under Hill, Bretforton and Dursley.

He died on 8 December 1864.

Church of England titles
Preceded by Thomas Rudge	Archdeacon of Gloucester; 1825–1864	Succeeded by Sir George Prévost, Bt.
