= Etton =

Etton may refer to:

- Etton, East Riding of Yorkshire, England
- Etton, Cambridgeshire, England
- John Etton
- Thomas Etton
- Guy Etton
