= Tinny Dean =

England international rugby union player & British Army officer

Tinny Dean MC
- Full name: Geoffrey John Dean
- Born: 12 November 1909 Lewisham, England
- Died: 12 December 1995 (aged 86) Poole, England
- School: Rugby School
- University: Pembroke College, Cambridge
- Occupation: Army officer / Farmer

Rugby union career
- Position: Scrum-half
International career
Years	Team	Apps	(Points)
1931	England	1	(0)

Lieutenant colonel Geoffrey John Dean (12 November 1909 – 12 December 1995), better known as Tinny Dean, was a British Army officer and England international rugby union player.

Born in Lewisham, London, Dean lived for a period in Australia as a child, due to his father's work as a leather exporter. He was educated at Rugby School and Pembroke College, Cambridge.

Dean, a diminutive scrum-half, went by the nickname "Tiny", which was morphed into "Tinny" after he was commissioned into the Royal Tank Corps in 1931. He played his rugby for the Army, Barbarians, Cambridge University, Combined Services, Harlequins and Sussex. In 1931, Dean gained an England cap, preferred over varsity teammate Brian Pope for the Five Nations match against Ireland at Twickenham.

In World War II, Dean was awarded a Military Cross and served as a Squadron Commander with the 2nd Royal Tank Regiment in North Africa, where he was badly injured in 1941 when his tank ran over a landmine. His foot was immediately amputated and he underwent further surgery after getting gangrene. Following a period in Italian captivity, Dean returned home in 1942 and became an instructor at Sandhurst.

Dean remained with the army until 1949, when he settled in Devon to breed cattle and pigs. He was a friend of RAF flying ace Douglas Bader, his former Combined Services halfback partner, who was also an amputee.

== See also ==
- List of England national rugby union players
