= Robert Parsons =

Robert Parsons may refer to:

== Sports ==
- Drew Parsons (cricketer) (Robert Andrew Parsons, born 1975), Scottish cricketer
- Bob Parsons (American football) (1950–2022), American football player
- Bob Parsons (Australian footballer) (1941–2015), Australian rules footballer for Footscray
- Bob Parsons (basketball) (1915–1985), American basketball player

== Others ==
- Robert Parsons (composer) (c. 1535–1572), English composer
- Robert Parsons (archdeacon) (died 1714), English priest
- Robert Persons (1546–1610), or Parsons, English priest
- Robert E. Parsons (1892–1966), American politician
- Robert John Parsons (died 1883), journalist and politician in Newfoundland
- Bob Parsons (born 1950), American entrepreneur
