= John Sheringham =

English clergyman

The Venerable John William Sheringham (20 February 1820 - 6 February 1904) was an English clergyman.

Born in Hanwell, Sheringham was educated at St John's College, Cambridge. After a curacy at St Barnabas, Kensington, he was Vicar of Strood, Kent, from 1848 to 1864 and of Standish with Hardwicke, Gloucestershire, from 1864 to 1889.

In 1881 he was appointed Archdeacon of Gloucester, a position he held until his retirement in 1902.

Sheringham died in Gloucester in 1904. He was the father-in-law of the civil servant Sir Edward Wingfield.

Church of England titles
Preceded by Sir George Prevost, 2nd Baronet	Archdeacon of Gloucester; 1881–1902	Succeeded by John Phillips Allcot Bowers
