= Tickencote =

Village in Rutland, England

Coordinates: 52.676°N 0.536°W

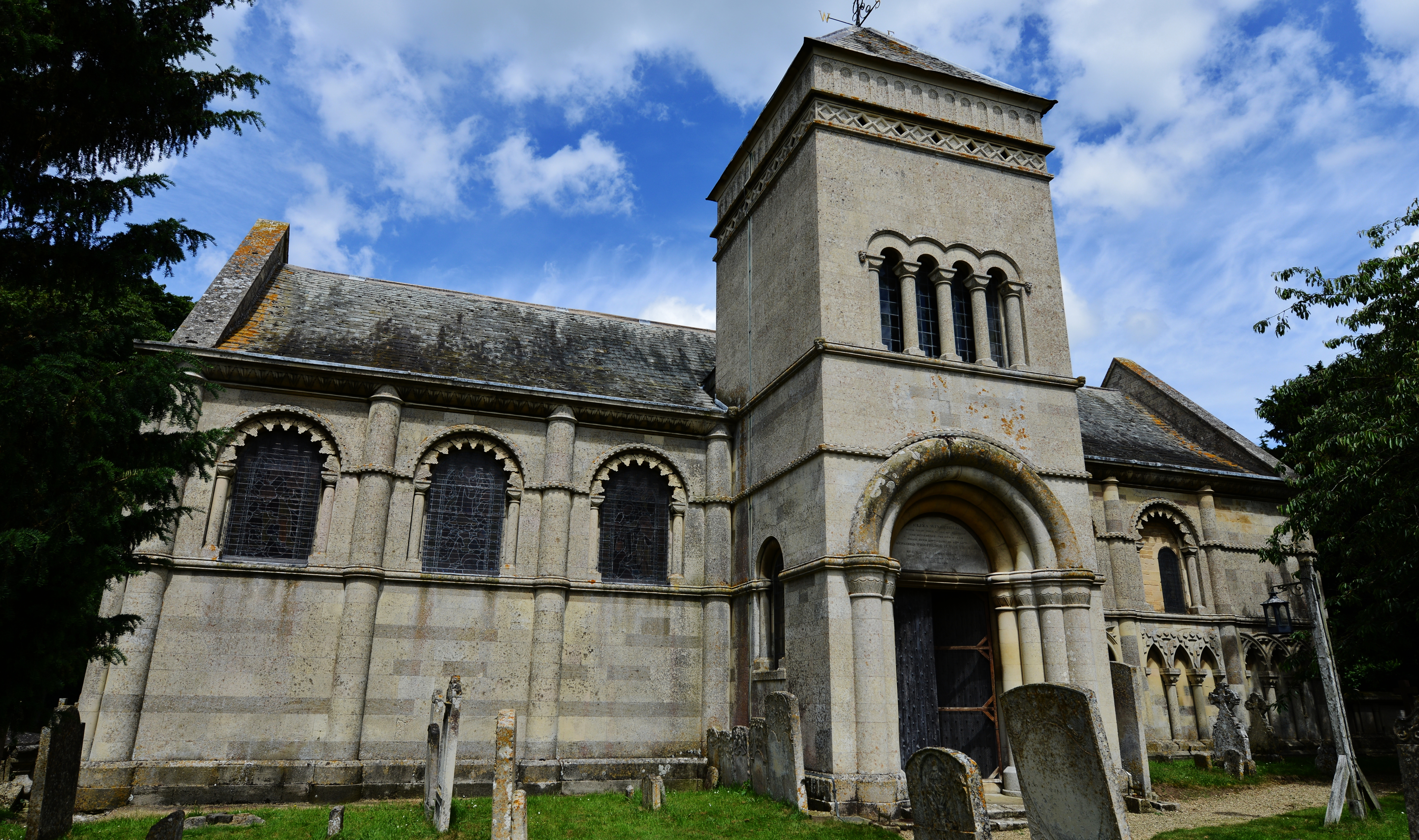
- St Peter's Church, Tickencote

- Location within Rutland
- Area: 2.02 sq mi (5.2 km^{2})
- Population: 67 2001 census
  - Density: 33/sq mi (13/km^{2})
- OS grid reference: SK990096
  - London: 83 miles (134 km) SSE
- Unitary authority: Rutland
- Shire county: Rutland
- Ceremonial county: Rutland
- Region: East Midlands
- Country: England
- Sovereign state: United Kingdom
- Post town: STAMFORD
- Postcode district: PE9
- Dialling code: 01780
- Police: Leicestershire
- Fire: Leicestershire
- Ambulance: East Midlands
- UK Parliament: Rutland and Stamford
- Website: Village website

Tickencote is a small village and civil parish in the county of Rutland in the East Midlands of England. It is noted for St Peter's Church, with its Norman chancel arch. The population at the 2001 census was 67. At the 2011 census the population remained less than 100 and was included together with the parish of Great Casterton.

== Geography ==
The parish essentially stretches along the A1 (Ermine Street) from the Bloody Oaks junction to the Casterton junction. At the far north of the parish, the Warren Plantation is on the north-east side of the A1. To the north-west is Empingham. On the southern edge of Exeter Gorse, it borders Great Casterton. The boundary with Great Casterton to the B1081 junction is one field's width north-east of the A1, running parallel to the carriageways, passing the eastern edge of Tickencote Warren farm.

It crosses the A1 at the B1081 junction 200 metres west of the A1 bridge where it crosses the Rutland Round, following the hedge to the west side of Ingthorpe where it meets the River Gwash and Tinwell. At Wild's Lodge it meets Empingham. It passes northwards along the eastern edge of Chapel Field Spinney again crossing the Rutland Round. It passes east of Cross Roads Farm then follows the road to Bloody Oaks.

=== Service station ===
On the northbound A1, sandwiched against the B1081 access road, is the Bloody Oaks Service Station with an OK Diner and a JET (previously a Texaco forecourt) petrol station. Bloody Oaks is at the next junction northwards. The service station allows access to the B1081 for northbound traffic. Southbound traffic on the A1 cannot be accessed.

=== Footpaths ===
The Rutland Round footpath passes west–east through the parish, and straight through the village, following the B1081 under the A1. National Cycle Route 63 also passes through the village, from Cross Roads Farm, then along the B1081, and onwards to Stamford.

=== Nature reserve ===
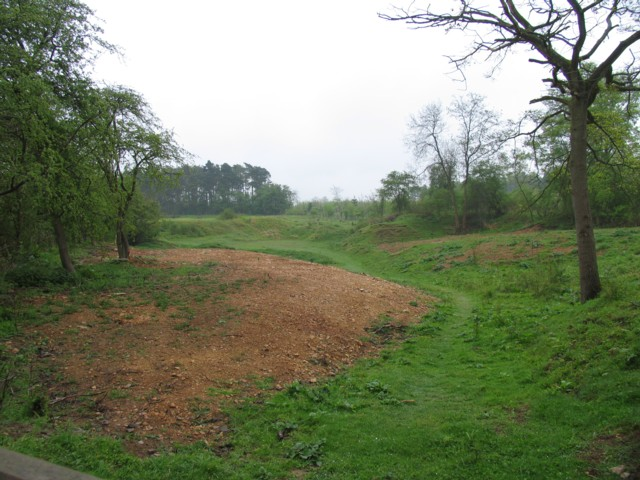
Bloody Oaks Quarry

Bloody Oaks Quarry is a 1.3-hectare (3.2-acre) nature reserve and SSSI at the former quarry at OS ref SK 970108, south of Bloody Oaks on the south side of the road from Empingham to Bloody Oaks. The area is also known as Roundstone Hill, and is situated in the former quarry of Upper Lincolnshire oolitic limestone.

It is thought to be the furthest north in England that chalk milkwort is found. Other species found include Horseshoe Vetch, yellow-wort, Autumn Gentian, and common thyme. There are also Pyramidal and Bee Orchids.

Tickencote Marsh is a 3-hectare biological SSSI. The site in the valley of the River Gwash is a base-rich grazing marsh, a habitat which is becoming increasingly rare as a result of drainage and a decline in grazing. Common flora include lesser pond-sedge, marsh horsetail and jointed rush.

== History ==
The village's name means 'shed of young goats'.

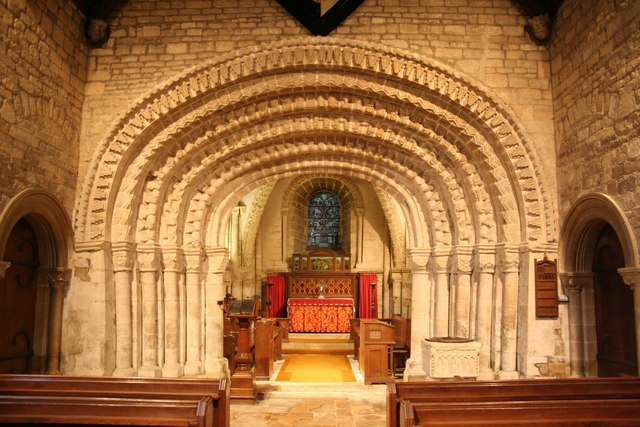
The remarkable chancel arch of St Peter's Church

The village is famous for St Peter's Church, Tickencote, which possesses a superb Norman chancel arch and an unusual chancel roof vault. In the arch, five orders of shafts support seven orders of moulded arches with zig zag, billet, beak heads, grotesques, crenellations and all manner of leaves, animals and motifs. The arch has sunk in the last 900 years to give a rather depressed appearance. The church was partly rebuilt in neo-Norman style by Samuel Pepys Cockerell in 1792.

From 1909 to 1912 the vicar was the Venerable Lonsdale Ragg, later the Archdeacon of Gibraltar from 1934 to 1945.

John Clare, when working as a lime burner, used to drink at the Flowerpot Inn, which is now the private house, Flower Pot Cottage (former Stonecroft). In 1903, William Le Queux wrote The Tickencote Treasure.

The village was formerly the location of Tickencote Hall, built in 1705 and demolished in 1950. This was the seat of the Wingfield family who carried out much of the restoration of the church. Notable family members included the civil servant Sir Edward Wingfield; Maurice Edward Wingfield CMG, son of John Wingfield, acting Colonial Secretary of the Colony of the Gambia; and Major John Maurice Wingfield (brother of Maurice Edward Wingfield), who became High Sheriff of Rutland in 1911.

When the Stamford Bypass was first built in October 1960, the bypass terminated with a roundabout at Tickencote, with the B1081, and the dual-carriageway continued a half-mile north near Tickencote Park. The roundabout regularly had goods vehicles overturning and shedding their load.

On 11 August 1971 the section of dual carriageway north of Tickencote to The Fox at South Witham, was opened by Earl Gainsborough, Chairman of Rutland County Council, at the B1081 junction. The section was 8.5 miles (13.7 km) long, took two years to build by Turriff Construction, and cost £2.3 million.

Another historical feature of the village is a watermill that went out of use in the mid-1930s. Records show that the original mill was in use in the 4th century AD on the south side of the river, whereas the present mill is on the north side of the river and bears an inscription reading 'Tickencote Mill erected 1731 by John Wingfield'.
