= Timothy Stonhouse Vigor =

Timothy Stonhouse-Vigor (18 September 1765 – 3 January 1831) was Archdeacon of Gloucester from 1804 until 1814.

He was the son of James Stonhouse (seventh baronet) and his wife Sarah née Ekins: He married Charlotte Huntingford, daughter of Thomas (a vicar), on 6 July 1796: four of his five sons were clergymen. He was educated at Oriel College, Oxford. He was Vicar of Sunninghill, Berkshire before his years as Archdeacon. After this he was Chaplain to the Bishop of Hereford.

Church of England titles
Preceded by James Webster	Archdeacon of Gloucester; 1804–1814	Succeeded by Thomas Rudge
