= Edward Wingfield (civil servant) =

British barrister and civil servant

Sir Edward Wingfield KCB (6 March 1834 – 5 March 1910), was a British barrister and civil servant who held the position of Permanent Under-Secretary of State for the Colonies from 1897 to 1900.

== Family and education ==
Born in Bath, Somerset, Wingfield was the fourth son of John Muxloe Wingfield JP DL (1790–1869) and Catherine Anne Harriett Lee (1798–1863), of Tickencote Hall, Rutland. The Hall had been in the Wingfield family since 1594.

He was educated at Winchester College and New College, Oxford.

In 1872 he married Mary Georgina Sheringham (1849–1918), daughter of the Ven. John Sheringham, later Archdeacon of Gloucester.

== Career and retirement ==
Wingfield entered Lincoln's Inn in 1856 and was called to the bar in 1859. From 1865 to 1878 he was a reporter for the Incorporated Council of Law Reporting.

After joining the Civil Service, Wingfield served as Assistant Under-Secretary of State at the Colonial Office from 1878 to 1897 and Permanent Under-Secretary of State for the Colonies from 1897 to 1900.

Following his retirement, he moved to Mulbarton Hall in Norfolk, the residence of his aunt, Emma Dorinda Wingfield (1814–1906). On her death he inherited the Hall and commissioned the Norwich architect Edward Boardman to add a wing in 1907.

He died at Mulbarton Hall on 5 March 1910 at the age of 75 and is buried with his wife in the churchyard of St Peter's, Tickencote.

== Honours ==
Wingfield was made a Companion of the Order of the Bath (CB) in 1889 and a Knight of the Order (KCB) in 1899.

Government offices
Preceded by Sir Robert Meade	Permanent Under-Secretary of State for the Colonies; 1897–1900	Succeeded by Sir Montagu Ommanney
