= Great Casterton =

Village in Rutland, England

Coordinates: 52.6694°N 0.5128°W

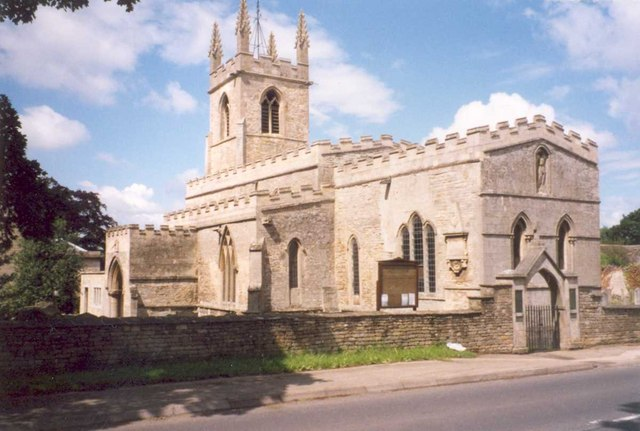
- Church of St Peter and St Paul, Great Casterton

- Location within Rutland
- Area: 3.6 sq mi (9.3 km^{2})
- Population: 600 (Including Tickencote)2011 Census
  - Density: 121/sq mi (47/km^{2})
- OS grid reference: TF005090
  - London: 83 miles (134 km) SSE
- Unitary authority: Rutland
- Shire county: Rutland
- Region: East Midlands
- Country: England
- Sovereign state: United Kingdom
- Post town: STAMFORD
- Postcode district: PE9
- Dialling code: 01780
- Police: Leicestershire
- Fire: Leicestershire
- Ambulance: East Midlands
- UK Parliament: Rutland and Stamford

Great Casterton is a village and civil parish in the county of Rutland in England. It is located at the crossing of the Roman Ermine Street and the River Gwash.

== Geography ==
The village is approximately three miles to the north-west of Stamford and very close to the county border with Lincolnshire (South Kesteven). Just to the north is Tickencote.

The parish boundary, to the south and east, lies close to the village, and follows the River Gwash. Just west of the B1081 bridge over the Gwash, it borders Tinwell. Just to the west of Ingthorpe (part of Tinwell), it borders Tickencote. The parish boundary crosses the A1 at the turn off for the village. The boundary then follows the A1 north, along the next hedge to the east (a field's width). It passes to the east of Tickencote Warren, and at Exeter Gorse it briefly borders Horn, then meets Pickworth. It passes to the south of Eayres Lodge, includes Woodhead, crossing Pickworth Road south of Taylor's Farm. West of Tolethorpe Oaks, it briefly meets Ryhall, then borders Little Casterton southwards, passing Frith Farm to the west and broadly follows the Danelaw Way. North of Little Casterton village, the boundary meets the Gwash.

The A1 road which follows the path of Ermine Street, ran through the centre of the village until the construction of the Stamford bypass in 1960; the former route of the Great North Road is now the B1081.

There is a very small nature reserve, Great Casterton Road Banks, to the south of the village containing examples of rare plants such as Sulphur Clover and Greater Broomrape.

== History ==
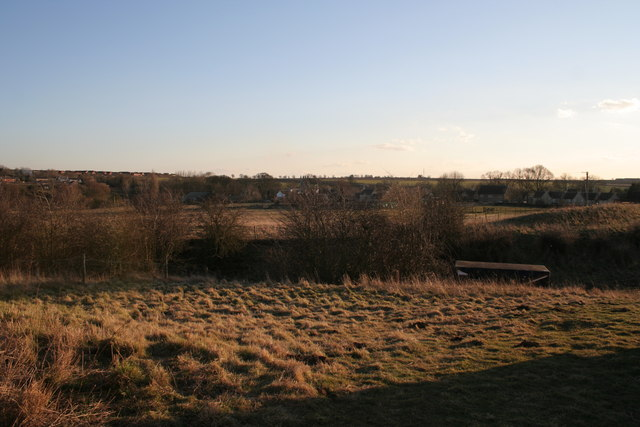
Roman town

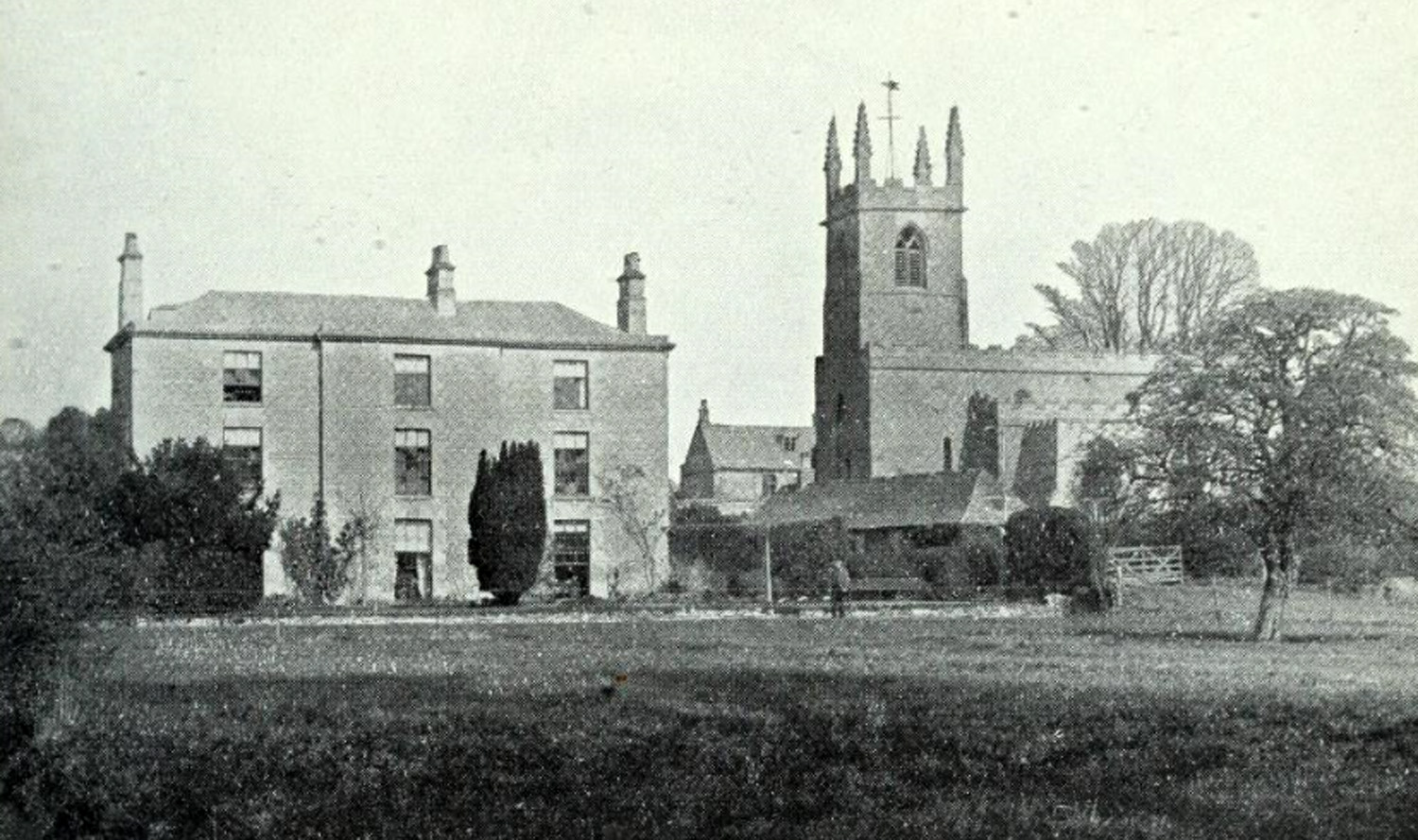
The Rectory and Parish Church in 1912

The village's name means 'farm/settlement which was/near a 'chester', Roman site'.

The earliest recorded settlement was a Roman fort ca 44 AD. A civilian settlement (vicus) developed which was later a walled town and the defences are still apparent. Archaeological excavations have been conducted on the town, a villa near the Gwash and burials including early Anglo-Saxons. The 2015 discovery of a skeleton secured at the ankles with a locked set of iron fetters is thought to be evidence of slavery in Roman Britain.

The Church of England parish church, dedicated to St Peter & St Paul, is recorded in the National Heritage List for England as a designated Grade I listed building. The churchyard is entered through an arched war memorial remembering the dead of both World Wars. The benefice is shared with Pickworth, Tickencote and Little Casterton. The poet John Clare was married to Martha "Patty" Turner at Great Casterton church in 1820.

Two miles north of the village are the earthwork remains of Woodhead Castle, a medieval moated ringwork with attached bailey.

== Amenities ==
The village has both a primary school, Great Casterton Church of England Primary School, and a secondary, Casterton College. The remaining pub in the village is the Crown Inn.
