= Prevost baronets of Belmont (1805) =

Baronetcy in the United Kingdom

The Prevost baronetcy, of Belmont near Southampton in Hampshire, is a title in the Baronetage of the United Kingdom. It was created on 6 December 1805 for the soldier and colonial administrator Lieutenant-General George Prevost. He was Governor General of British North America from 1812 to 1815. After his death in 1816 his widow Lady Prevost declined the offer of a peerage, as she did not consider herself and her family to have sufficient means to support the dignity. Prevost was the son of General Augustine Prevost, himself a distinguished soldier, who had emigrated to England from Geneva, Switzerland.

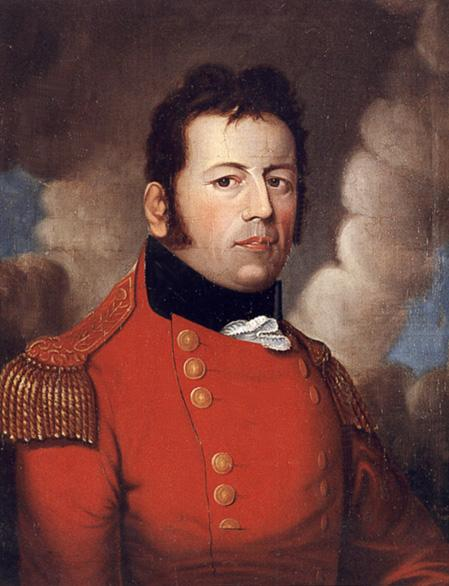
Sir George Prevost, 1st Baronet

== Prevost baronets, of Belmont (1805) ==
- Sir George Prevost, 1st Baronet (1767–1816)
- Sir George Prevost, 2nd Baronet (1804–1893)
- Lieutenant-Colonel Sir Charles Prevost, 3rd Baronet (1831–1902). The second son of the 2nd Baronet, he entered the 31st Regiment of Foot in 1850, and took part in the Crimean War where he was wounded at the Siege of Sevastopol, for which he received medals. He later commanded the 2nd Battalion West India Regiment. He married, in 1856, Sarah Keble, daughter of Rev. T. Keble, vicar of Dursley.
- Sir Charles Thomas Keble Prevost, 4th Baronet (1866–1939)
- Sir George James Augustine Prevost, 5th Baronet (1910–1985)
- Sir Christopher Gerald Prevost, 6th Baronet (born 1935)

The heir apparent to the baronetcy is Nicholas Marc Prevost (born 1971), eldest son of the 6th Baronet.

== Notes ==
Baronetage of the United Kingdom
Preceded by Green baronets	Prevost baronets of Belmont; 6 December 1805	Succeeded by Hardy baronets
