= James Webster (priest) =

James Webster (1734 - 1804) was Archdeacon of Gloucester from 1774 until 1804.

Webster was born in Rampside, educated at Christ's College, Cambridge and ordained in 1758. After a curacy in Grantham he was the incumbent at Much Cowarne.

His grandson was Lieutenant Governor of The Gambia from 1840 to 1841; and then of Prince Edward Island until 1847.

Church of England titles
Preceded by Richard Hurd	Archdeacon of Gloucester; 1774–1804	Succeeded by Timothy Stonhouse Vigor
