= Chris Wagstaff =

Archdeacon of Gloucester

Christopher John Harold Wagstaff (called Chris; born 25 June 1936) was Archdeacon of Gloucester from 1982 until 2000.

Wagstaff was educated at Bishop's Stortford College and St David's College, Lampeter; and ordained in 1964. After a curacy at Tokyngton he was Vicar of Coleford with Staunton from 1973 to 1983.

Church of England titles
Preceded by Walter Wardle	Archdeacon of Gloucester; 1982–2000	Succeeded by Geoffrey Sidaway
