= St Peter's Church, Tickencote =

Coordinates: 52.6741°N 0.5366°W

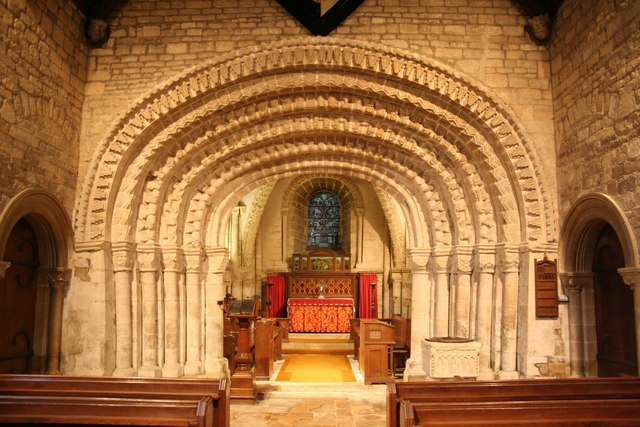
- The remarkable chancel arch in St Peter's Church, Tickencote

- Location in Rutland
- OS grid reference: SK9904409492
- Location: Tickencote, Rutland
- Country: England
- Denomination: Church of England

History
- Dedication: St Peter

Architecture
- Heritage designation: Grade I
- Designated: 14 June 1954
- Architect: Samuel Pepys Cockerell (restoration)
- Architectural type: Church
- Style: Norman; Romanesque Revival architecture

Specifications
- Materials: Limestone; Collyweston slate

Administration
- Province: Canterbury
- Diocese: Diocese of Peterborough

St Peter's Church, Tickencote is a Church of England parish church in Tickencote, Rutland. Apart from the chancel arch and the sexpartite vaulting in the chancel, which are Norman and date from the mid 12th century, the building was rebuilt in 1792 at the expense of Miss Eliza Wingfield by the architect Samuel Pepys Cockerell.

In 2019 the church passed into the care of the Churches Conservation Trust. While St Peter's underwent significant repair, the church was closed to visitors until June 2022.

== Architectural description ==
The church consists of a three bay nave, a chancel, tower of two storeys and a bell-stage on the south side and a transept on the north side which is used as a vestry. The tower also acts as an entrance porch. The church is built of the local limestone with Collyweston slate roofs and coped gables.

=== Chancel ===
The church now consists of a chancel with a sexpartite vault. The vaulting with its carving is original but may have been re-constructed in 1792 when the church was rebuilt and the chancel was encased with stonework, decorated in Romanesque revival style. The restored east end of the chancel has blind arcades of intersecting round-headed arches and engaged round shafts. There is a round-headed east window with stylized leaf-mouldings and billet-moulded hood mould continuing as frieze to either side. There are taller, narrower window lights in the priest's chamber which was above the chancel, but which is now blocked and inaccessible. Two orders of blind round-headed arcading above billet frieze. Blind rectangular panels in the east gable. On the north and south sides of chancel are arcade and billet friezes.

Inside the chancel, there is, in a recess, a 14th-century wooden effigy and there is a wooden altar table of 1627.

=== Chancel arch ===
The most import and impressive feature of the church is the round-headed chancel arch from the mid 12th century. This arch has six elaborately decorated orders on ornamental capitals. The inner order is roll-moulded, the second has beak-heads, the third has zig-zags and continuous crenellation, the fourth various heads including those of a king and queen, figures, animals, a Green Man and foliage and the fifth with zig-zags and the sixth an abstract version of beak mouldings. The outermost edge of the arch is decorated with billet moulding.

=== Tower and porch ===
The tower has pyramidal roof contains bells which until 1792 hung in a bell-cote at the west end of the chancel. The tower acts as a porch and the round-headed entrance has roll-moulded orders and tympanum with a tablet to Eliza Wingfield, at whose expense the 1792 restoration was undertaken.

=== Nave and font ===
The nave, which was later medieval, was completely rebuilt in the 1792 restoration. The font which is Romanesque, is slightly later in date than the chancel arch. The font currently is positioned close to the arch, but an eighteenth-century plan shows that it was originally closer to the west end on the north side. The exterior decoration of the nave is a much freer interpretation of the Romanesque style and must be considered one of the earliest examples of Romanesque Revival architecture in the British Isles.

== Burials ==
- Thomas Cromwell, 1st Earl of Ardglass, and his wife Elizabeth
- Sir Edward Wingfield and his wife Mary Georgina

== Gallery ==
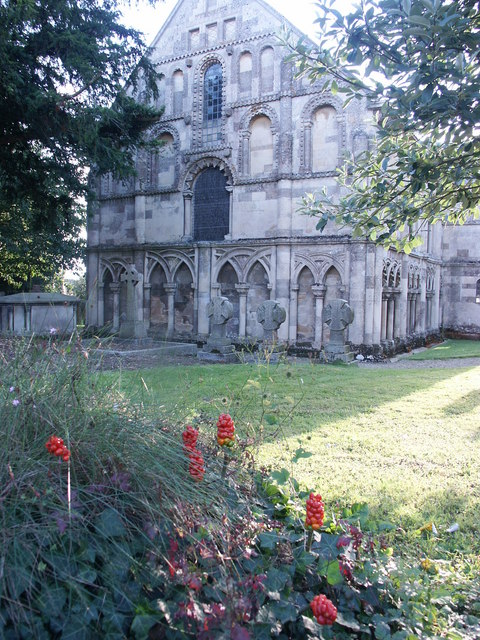
East face of the chancel

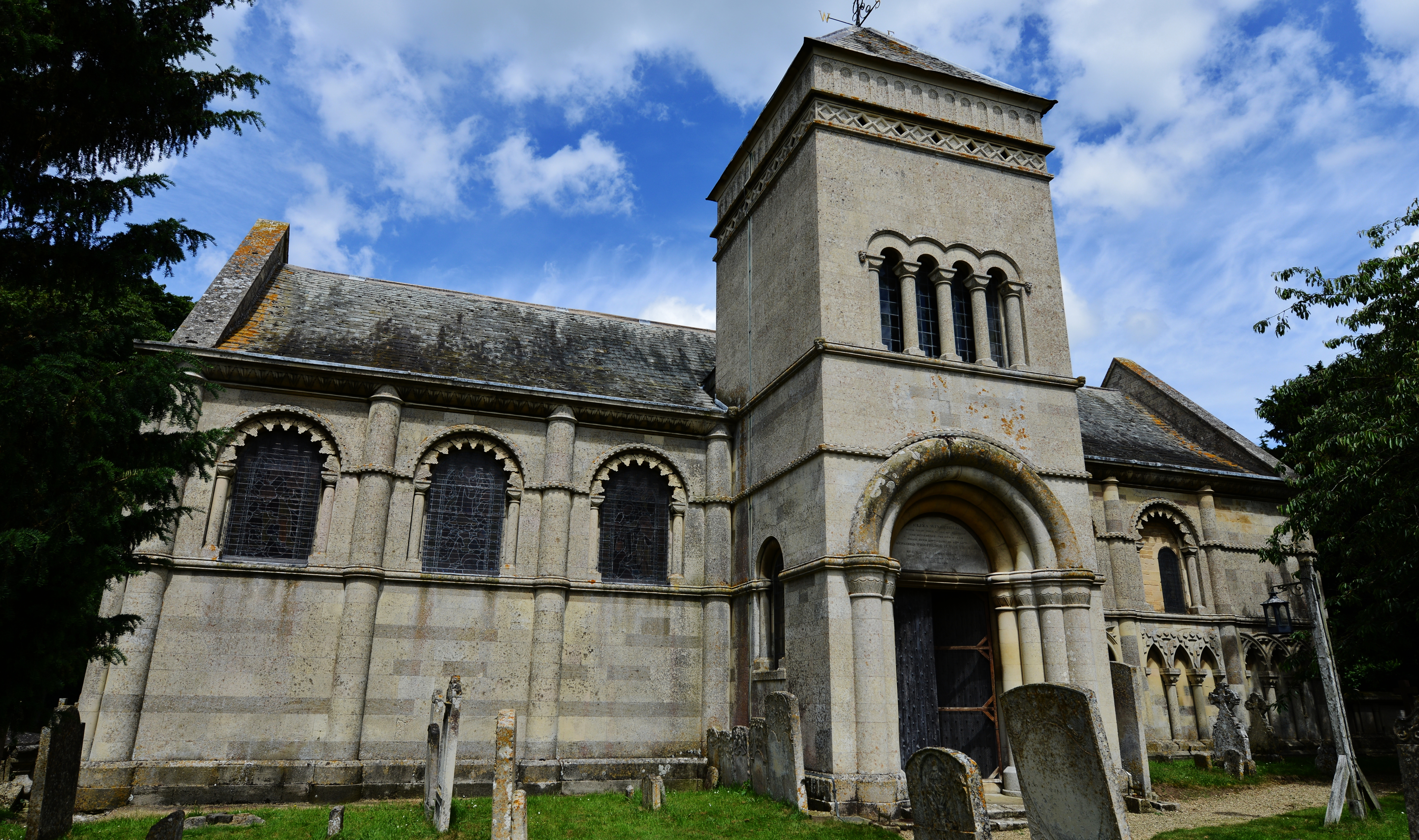
Church from the south

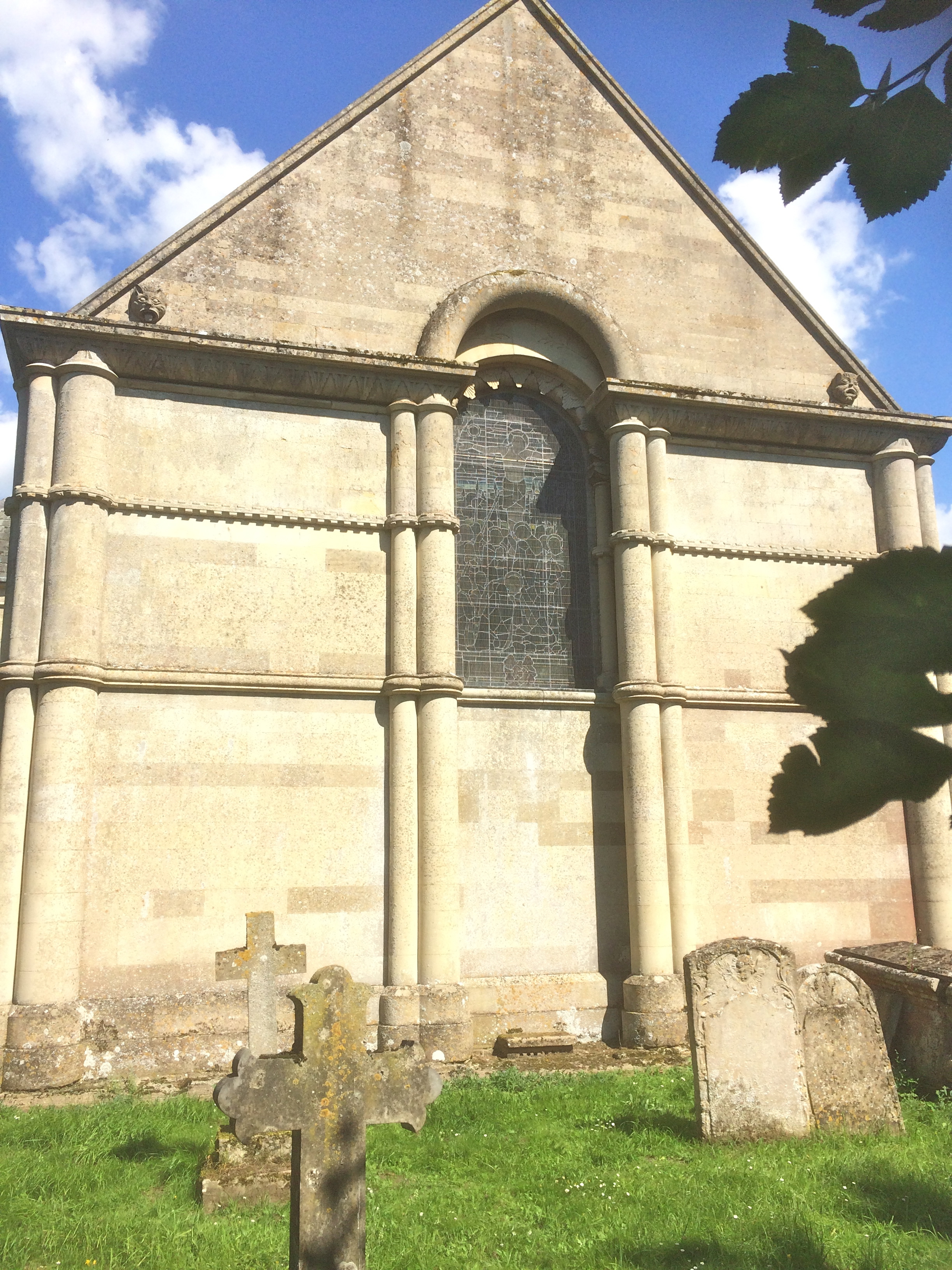
West end of the nave as re-designed by Cockerell in 1792

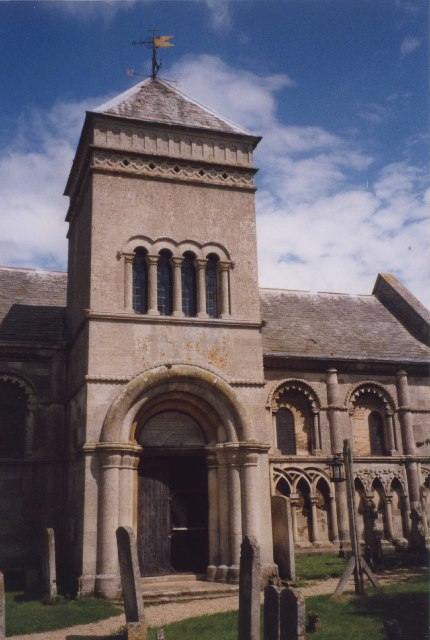
Tickencote Church

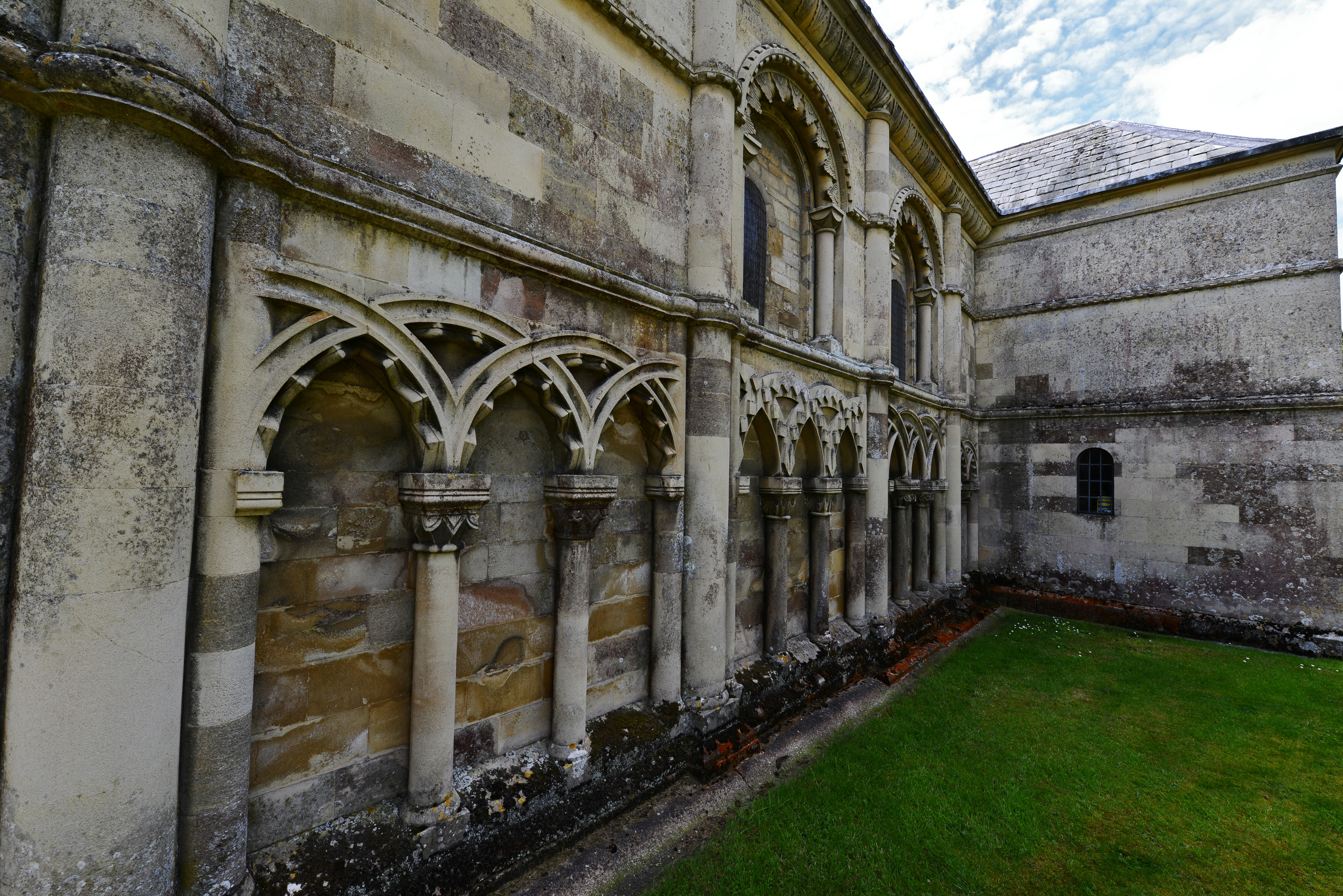
Blind arcading part of the restyled 1792 exterior on north side of chancel

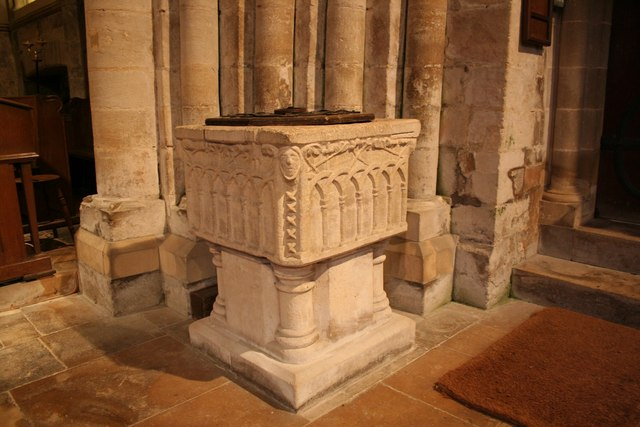
Norman font

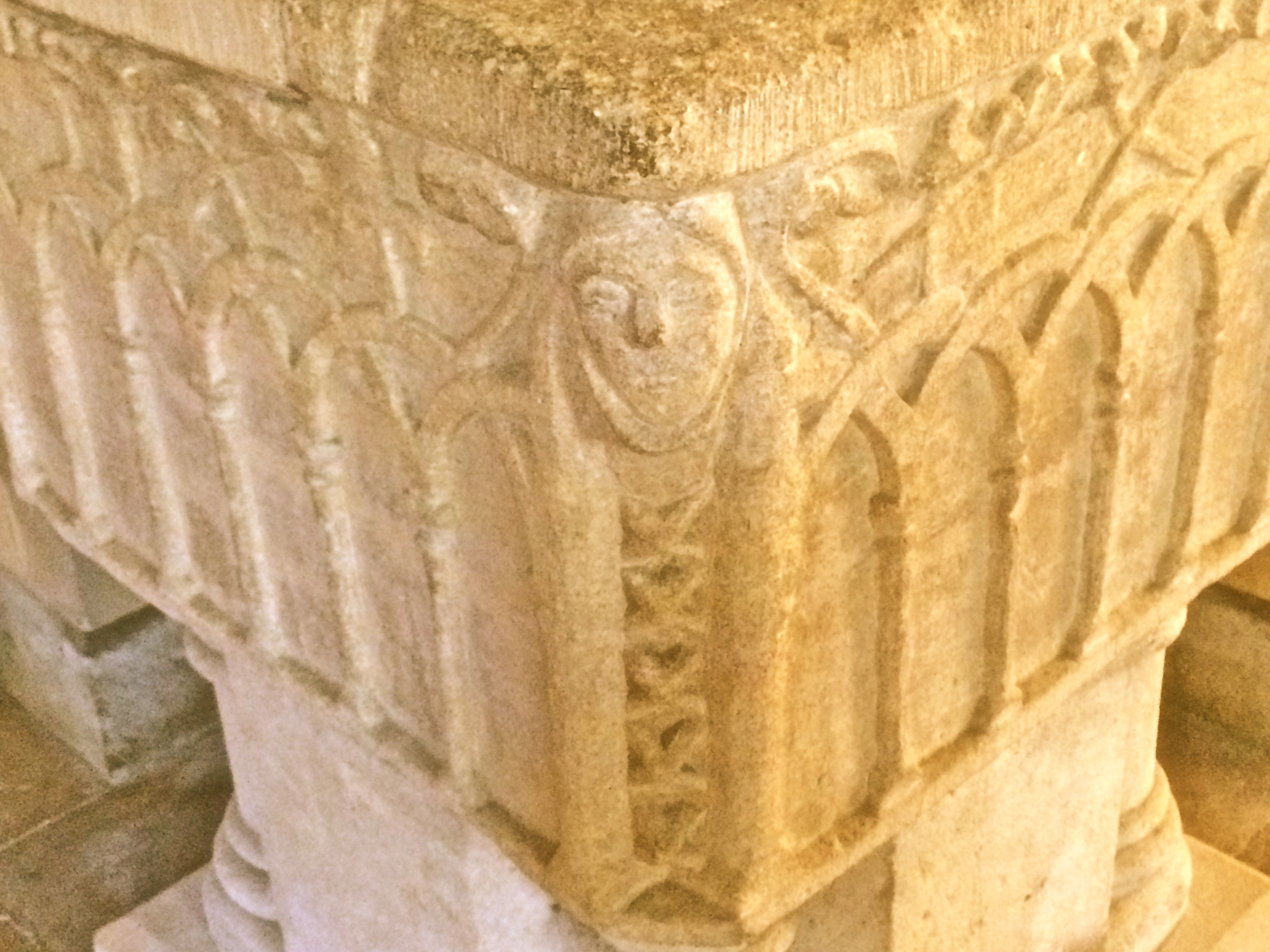
Human face and arcading on font

== Sources ==
- Pevsner, Nikolaus; Williamson, Elizabeth; Brandwood, Geoffrey K (1984) [1960]. Leicestershire and Rutland. The Buildings of England. Harmondsworth: Penguin Books. pp. 510–512.
- Camden W (ed Richard Gough), (1806) Britannia, 2nd Edition, Vol.2. 329, Pl VII
- Gentleman's Magazine, (1806), i, pg 34.
