= Nathaniel Lye =

English Anglican priest

Nathaniel Lye, D.D. was an English Anglican priest.

Lloyd was educated at Brasenose College, Oxford. He held livings at Cowley, Kemerton and Dursley. He was Archdeacon of Gloucester from 29 July 1714 until his death on 29 October 1737.
