= Samuel Burton (priest) =

The Venerable Samuel Barton was an Anglican priest in the first half of the 17th century.

Burton was born in Staffordshire and educated at Christ Church, Oxford. He held livings at Long Marston, Warwickshire and Stratton-on-the-Fosse, Somerset. Burton was Archdeacon of Gloucester from 1607 until his death on 14 June 1634.
