= George Prevost =

British Army officer and colonial administrator (1767–1816)

Lieutenant-General Sir George Prevost Bt
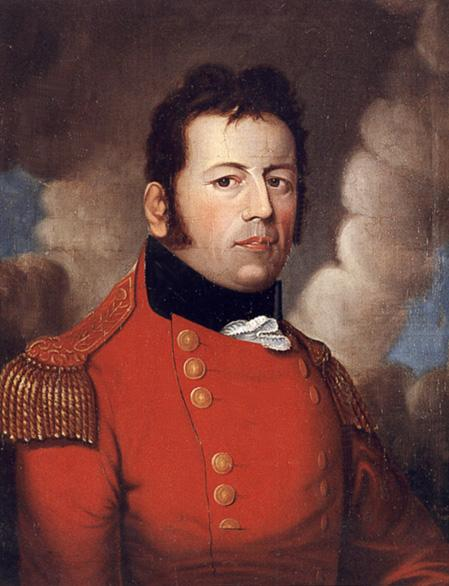
- Portrait by Jean-Baptiste Roy-Audy

Governor General of the Canadas
- In office 1812–1815
- Monarch: George III
- Preceded by: Sir James Henry Craig
- Succeeded by: Sir Gordon Drummond

Governor of Nova Scotia
- In office 1808–1811
- Monarch: George III
- Preceded by: Sir John Wentworth
- Succeeded by: Sir John Coape Sherbrooke

Personal details
- Born: 19 May 1767 New Barbadoes Township, Province of New Jersey, British America (now Hackensack, New Jersey, U.S.)
- Died: 5 January 1816 (aged 48) London, England
- Cause of death: Dropsy
- Resting place: Church of St Mary the Virgin, East Barnet, London, England
- Spouse: Catherine Anne Phipps
- Children: 5
- Parents: Augustine Prevost (father); Anne Francoise Marguerite Grand (mother)

Military service
- Allegiance: Great Britain; United Kingdom
- Branch/service: British Army
- Years of service: 1779–1816
- Rank: Lieutenant-general
- Commands: The Canadas
- Battles/wars: French Revolutionary Wars; War of 1812

Lieutenant-General Sir George Prevost, 1st Baronet (19 May 1767 – 5 January 1816) was a British Army officer and colonial administrator who is most well known as the "Defender of Canada" during the War of 1812. Born in New Jersey, son of Genevan Augustine Prevost, he joined the British Army as a youth and became a captain in 1784. Prevost served in the West Indies during the French Revolutionary Wars and the Napoleonic Wars, and was commander of St. Vincent from 1794 to 1796. He became Lieutenant-Governor of Saint Lucia from 1798 to 1802 and Governor of Dominica from 1802 to 1805. He is best known to history for serving as both the civilian Governor General and the military Commander in Chief in British North America (now part of Canada) during the War of 1812 between Britain and the United States.

== Early life ==
George Prevost was born on 19 May 1767, in New Barbadoes Township (now Hackensack), New Jersey. His father was Augustin Prevost (1723–1786), a French-speaking Protestant from the Republic of Geneva, and a lieutenant-colonel in the British Army. His mother was Anne Francoise Marguerite "Nanette" Grand. George Prevost was educated at schools in England and in the North American continent.

== Early military career ==
=== 1779–1790 ===
On 3 May 1779, Prevost was commissioned at the age of eleven, as an ensign in the 60th Regiment of Foot, in which his father was a senior officer. In 1782, he transferred to the 47th Regiment of Foot, as a lieutenant, followed in 1784 by a move to the 25th Regiment of Foot as a captain. He then returned to the 60th Foot on 18 November 1790 with the rank of major, at the age of 23. Prevost's maternal grandfather was a wealthy banker in Amsterdam, and his money is considered to have certainly been responsible for his grandson's quick advancement up the chain of command in the British Army, as promotion could then be obtained "by purchase".

=== 1791–mid-1802 ===
While serving in the 60th, Prevost was promoted to lieutenant-colonel on 6 August 1794. He was stationed in St Vincent from 1794–1795. During fighting on 20 January 1796, he was wounded twice, and he returned to England shortly after, where he was appointed to become an inspecting field officer. On 1 January 1798, Prevost became a colonel, and on 8 March he became a brigadier-general, at the age of 30. In May he was appointed to be the lieutenant governor of St Lucia, where his fluency in French and conciliatory administration won him the respect of the French planters living there. In 1802, he returned to Britain as a result of ill health.

=== Late 1802–1806 ===
On 27 September 1802, soon after fighting against France resumed, Prevost was chosen to be the Governor of Dominica. In 1803, the French attempted to seize the island, and Prevost fought against them. He would also fight against the French in an effort to reclaim St Lucia. On 1 January 1805, at the age of 37, Prevost was promoted to major-general, and soon after he was granted leave to return to England, where he became Lieutenant-Governor of Portsmouth and General Officer Commanding South-West District in December 1805, and where he was appointed to be a baronet. In 1806, Prevost became a colonel commandant of his regiment.

== Service as Lieutenant Governor of Nova Scotia ==
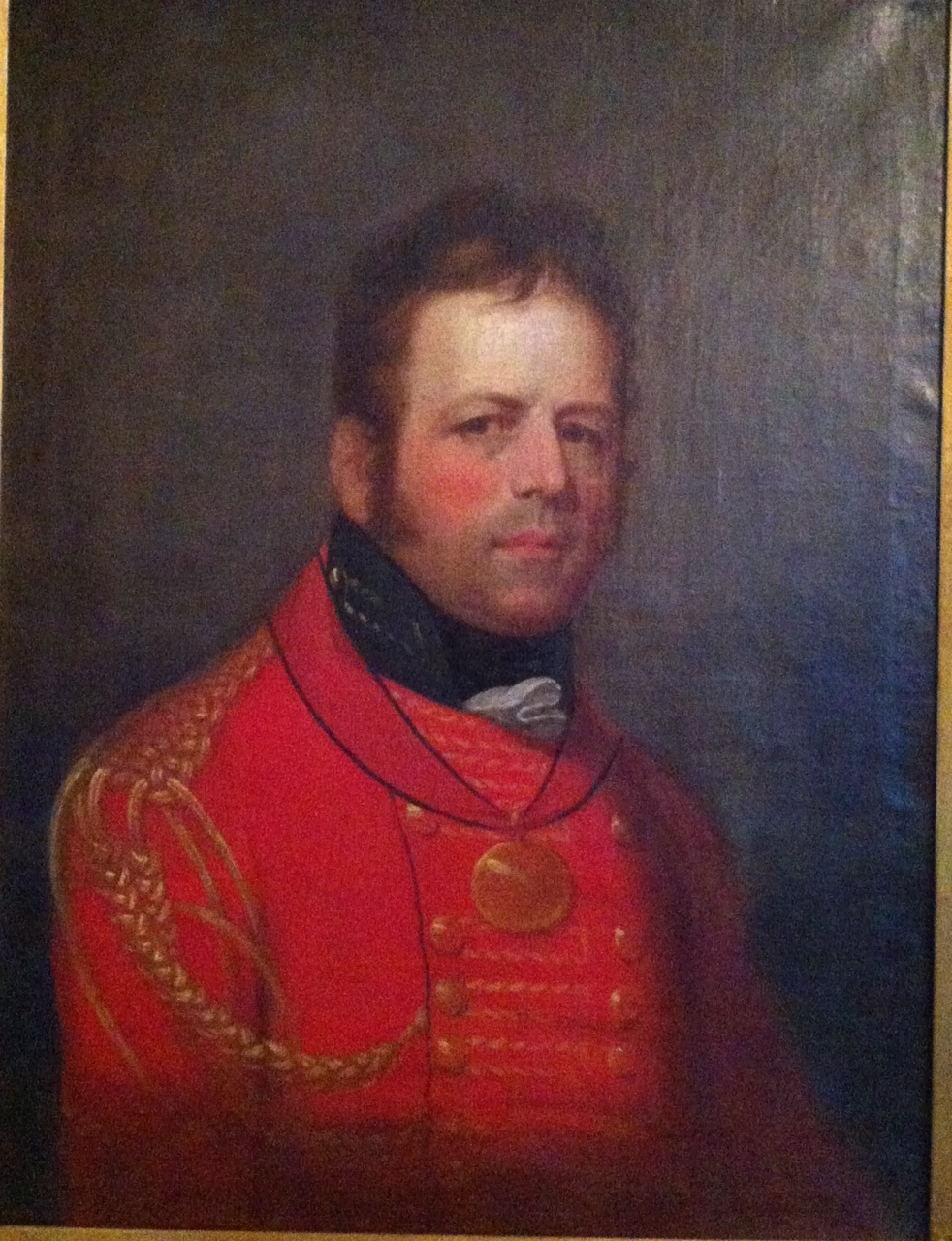
Prevost by Robert Field, Government House (Nova Scotia)

On 15 January 1808, Prevost was appointed to become the Lieutenant Governor of Nova Scotia, and he was also promoted to lieutenant-general, although this was a rank that he held only in Nova Scotia. He was tasked with improving the military defences of the Atlantic colonies. He arrived at Halifax on 7 April 1808 and by the end of April he had taken steps to increase opposition in New England to the American government's hostile attitude towards Britain. The President of the United States of America in 1808, Thomas Jefferson, had placed an embargo on American trading with Britain. From 1808, to the beginning of the War of 1812, Prevost tried to encourage New England to trade with Britain by setting up "free ports" in Nova Scotia and New Brunswick, where American goods could be landed without a need to pay customs duties. This led to a substantial increase in Nova Scotia's trade not only with New England, but also with the West Indies. Prevost could do little to improve the sub-standard fortifications in Nova Scotia, but was able to secure the approval of the legislature in Nova Scotia to amend a militia law, which led to Prevost's ability to mobilize a small, effective militia force to work with the regular garrison during an emergency.

The amendment of the law is considered to be a good achievement by Prevost, because his predecessor as lieutenant governor, John Wentworth, had been responsible for relations between the executive and legislative bodies of Nova Scotia weakening. Wentworth had tried to increase his own executive power at the expense of the legislative House of Assembly. When Prevost arrived, the House of Assembly, led by William Cottnam Tonge, was struggling to control government expenditures. In an effort to appease Tonge, Prevost appointed him to be his second-in-command during an expedition against Martinique.

=== Invasion of Martinique (1809) ===
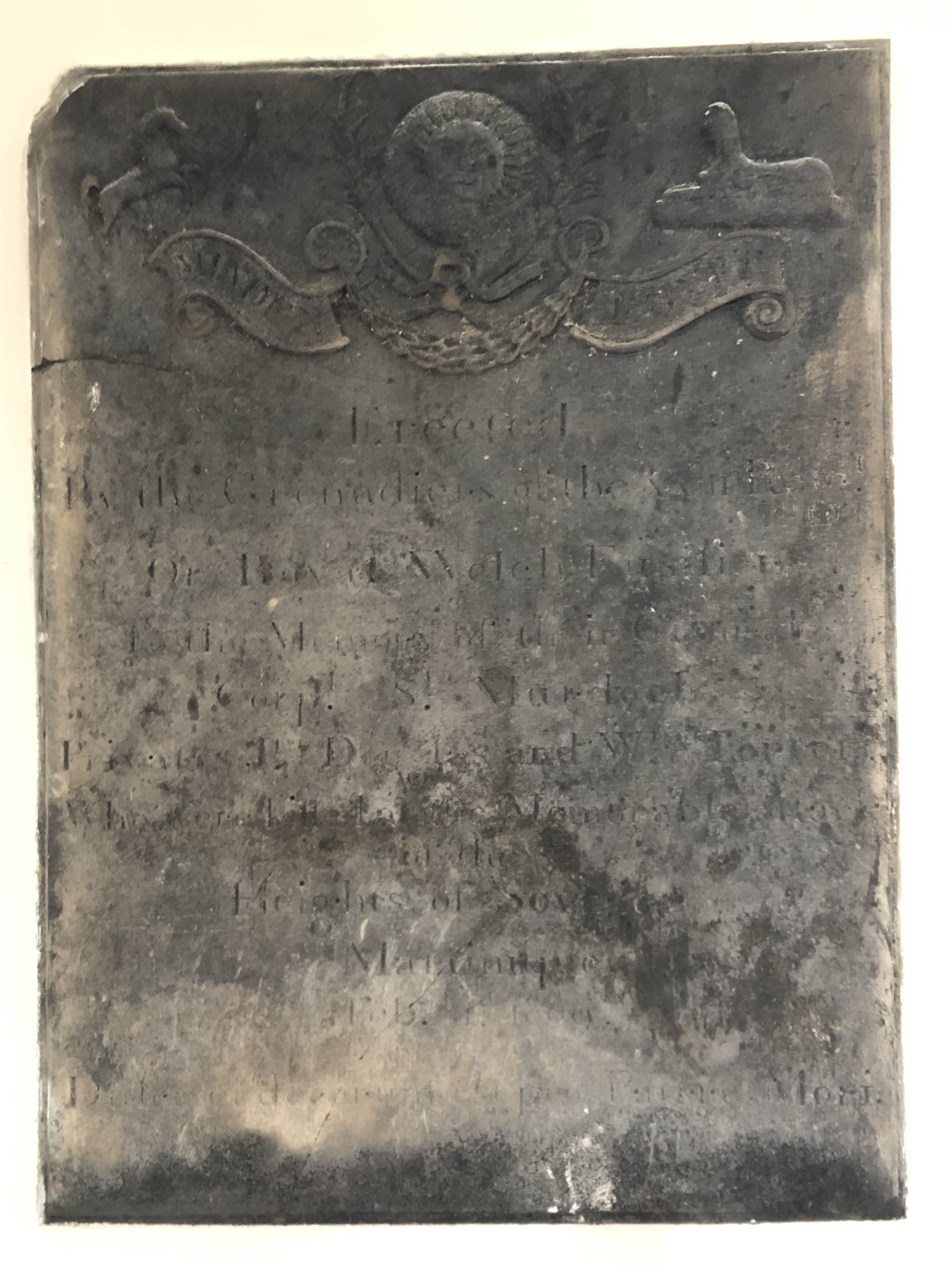
Prevost's monument to soldiers killed during Invasion of Martinique (1809) Monument, St. George's (Round) Church, Halifax, Nova Scotia

They departed from Halifax on 6 December 1808. Unfortunately, Tonge’s departure did not lead to a peaceful relationship between the House of Assembly and the executive body as Prevost’s replacement during his absence, Alexander Croke, fought with the Assembly over a supply bill. Eventually, Croke rejected the bill on the basis that it did not fit in with royal prerogatives, and then could not reach an agreement with the Legislative Council over how to settle the dispute between himself and the Assembly.

Martinique was captured, and Prevost returned to Halifax on 15 April 1809. Tonge did not return, as he decided to stay in the West Indies. Prevost opposed Croke’s actions, restored "good understanding" with the Legislative Council, and then calmed the Assembly by deciding not to follow the constitution of Nova Scotia down to the letter. On 10 June 1808, the House of Assembly passed the supply bill, and also voted to use 200 guineas to purchase a sword for Prevost as a sign of their approval for Prevost's conduct during the expedition against Martinique. Prevost believed he had successfully maintained the crown's prerogative. In 1809, using his good relationship with the Assembly, he was able to secure a tax on distilled liquors, with the proceeds of which he could pay the cost of equipment for the provincial militia. For the rest of his term as lieutenant governor of Nova Scotia, Prevost ensured he did not make an executive act that the Assembly would oppose to a great degree.

Prevost had become a popular lieutenant governor, but this was threatened by his attempts, beginning in 1810, to strengthen the Church of England in Nova Scotia, since that might alienate other religious groups. He persuaded the British government to allow him to use surplus arms funds to develop Anglican churches, and to enlarge King's College in Windsor. He also appointed Anglican clergy to be civil magistrates, protected the Anglican ownership of land and their influence over the education of children, and placed an Anglican bishop in the Legislative Council. On the condition that the bishop resided in Halifax, Prevost was able to increase the salary of the bishop. In an effort to appease other religious groups, he appointed a number of Roman Catholic and Presbyterian clergy to be magistrates, and he authorized a grant of money for the Church of Scotland.

During May 1811, when Prevost was preparing to oppose the Assembly over its policy of compensating its members for their expenses, feeling that it was irregular, open to abuse, and "an evil highly dangerous to the prerogative of the Crown", he was ordered to move to Lower Canada to replace Governor Craig.

== Service as Governor-in-Chief of British North America ==
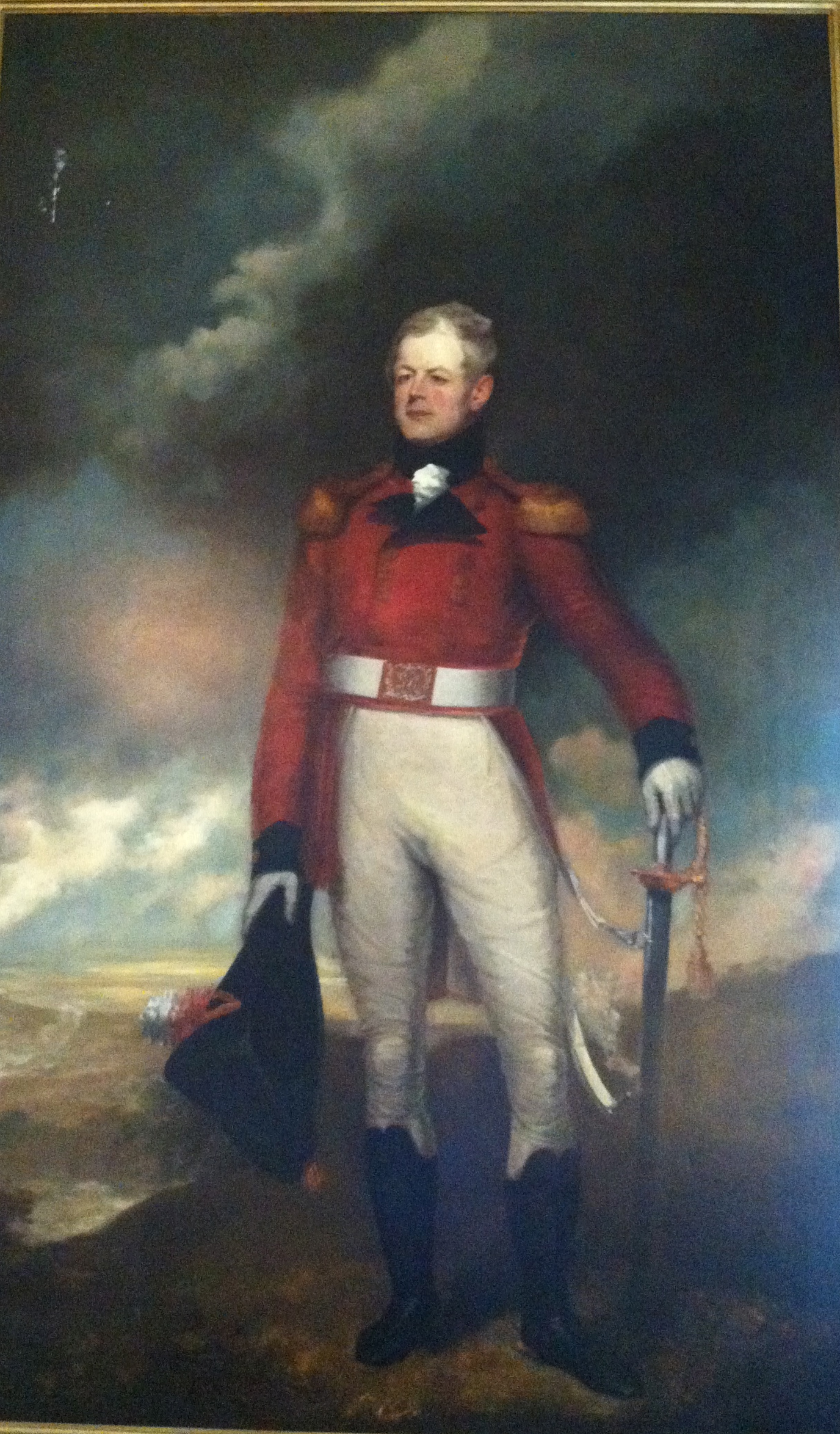
Sir George Prevost with sword from Nova Scotia House of Assembly to commemorate his victory at Martinique. Painting by Robert Field, The Halifax Club, Halifax, Nova Scotia

On 4 July 1811, Prevost became a lieutenant-general outside of Nova Scotia, and was appointed as commander-in-chief of British forces in North America. On 21 October, he was appointed to be the governor-in-chief of British North America (Captain-General and Governor-in-Chief in and over the Provinces of Upper-Canada, Lower-Canada, Nova Scotia, and New-Brunswick, and their several Dependencies, Vice-Admiral of the same, Lieutenant-General and Commander of all His Majesty’s Forces in the said Provinces of Lower-Canada and Upper-Canada, Nova Scotia and New-Brunswick, and their several Dependencies, and in the islands of Newfoundland, Prince Edward, Cape Breton and the Bermudas, &c. &c. &c. Beneath Prevost, the staff of the British Army in the Provinces of Nova-Scotia, New-Brunswick, and their Dependencies, including the Islands of Newfoundland, Cape Breton, Prince Edward and Bermuda were under the Command of Lieutenant-General Sir John Coape Sherbrooke. Below Sherbrooke, the Bermuda Garrison was under the immediate control of the Governor of Bermuda, Major-General George Horsford). As commander-in-chief, he took over the presidency and administration of Lower Canada from Thomas Dunn on 14 September. He would remain the president of Lower Canada until 15 July 1812. During his time as commander-in-chief, he was focused on ensuring the military security of the Atlantic colonies.

Prevost was worried about the disposition of Canadians if a war started involving British North America and tried to conciliate Canadian political leaders, who had been disappointed by the partisan alliance between Craig and the British oligarchy. The leader of the Canadian party, Pierre-Stanislas Bédard, was opposed by several people trying to gain his position, and Prevost exploited the rivalry. In 1812, Bédard, losing his motivation for continuing as leader, was given a judgeship in an area of British North America from which he could not have a major influence over the general political system. Prevost worked with the moderate Louis-Joseph Papineau, treating him as the leader. Prevost also nominated five Canadians to be appointed to the Legislative Council between 1811 and 1815, an unusual move as Canadians had usually been excluded from being appointed since 1798. In a report to the Colonial Office, Prevost said that he wanted to create a Legislative Council "possessed of the consideration of the country, from a majority of its members being independent of the government", in order to transfer to it "the political altercations which have been hitherto carried on by the governor in person."

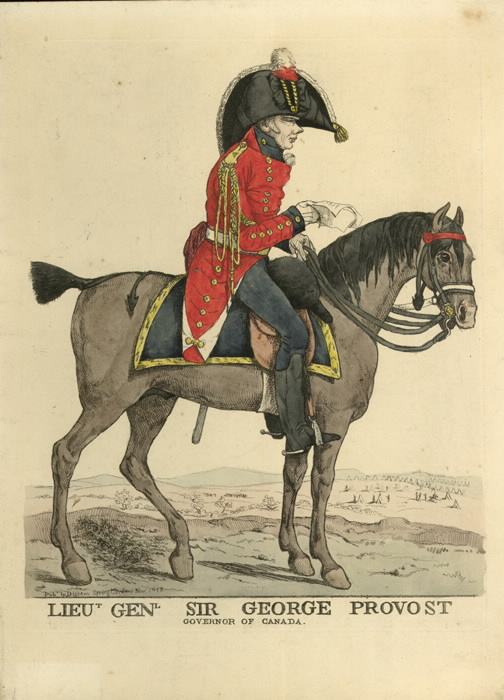
Prevost in 1812

=== War of 1812 ===
For most of the War, Prevost's strategy was defensive and cautious. Learning in August 1812 that the British government had repealed some of the Orders in Council (1807) which the United States regarded as a cause of war, he negotiated an armistice with commanding General Henry Dearborn, but President James Madison soon repudiated Dearborn's agreement and the war resumed. During the early months of 1813, Prevost twice visited Upper Canada where the military and civil situation was unsatisfactory after the Governor and Commander there (Major General Isaac Brock) had been killed in action. As a result, he was present in Kingston in May, and took personal charge of an attack on the main American naval base on Lake Ontario. A victory here could have been decisive but the expedition was hastily mounted and at the Battle of Sackett's Harbor both Prevost and the naval commander, Commodore James Lucas Yeo, attacked hesitantly. After meeting stiff resistance, they withdrew.

In 1814, large reinforcements became available after the defeat of Napoleon Bonaparte. Prevost was appointed Colonel of the 16th, Bedfordshire Regiment in April. He planned an attack along Lake Champlain and the Hudson River, but the army which he led personally was driven back at the Battle of Plattsburgh after the British naval squadron on Lake Champlain was defeated. Commodore Yeo considered that the British ships under Captain George Downie (who was killed in the action) had been ordered into action prematurely by Prevost, and that Prevost had failed to order an attack by his own troops until it was too late to avert the defeat of Downie's squadron.

Prevost had also made himself unpopular among some of the Army officers under his command who were veterans of the Peninsular War (such as Manley Power, Thomas Brisbane, and Frederick Philipse Robinson) by his perceived over-caution, and his niggling insistence on correct dress and uniform. He had also alienated several successful Canadian officers (such as Charles de Salaberry) by seeming to claim their successes for himself and failing to reward them properly. However, it was the complaints by the Navy and Peninsular veterans which prompted his recall. Although the Duke of Wellington accepted that Prevost's strategy was correct, he wrote on 30 October 1814,

It is very obvious to me that you must remove Sir George Prevost. I see he has gone to war about trifles with the general officers I sent him, which are certainly the best of their rank in the army; and his subsequent failure and distresses will be aggravated by that circumstance; and will probably with the usual fairness of the public be attributed to it.

In December, Wellington's former Quartermaster General, Sir George Murray, was sent to Canada with the local rank of Lieutenant General specifically to order Prevost to return to London to explain his conduct of the Plattsburg campaign. He delivered the order on 2 March 1815, by coincidence only a day or so after news of the ratification of the Treaty of Ghent, which ended the war, arrived in Quebec. Prevost felt himself publicly humiliated by the manner and timing of his succession. After ordering hostilities to cease and disbanding the militia, he left Quebec on 3 April. He was given a hasty vote of thanks by the Assembly in Quebec.

== Later life ==
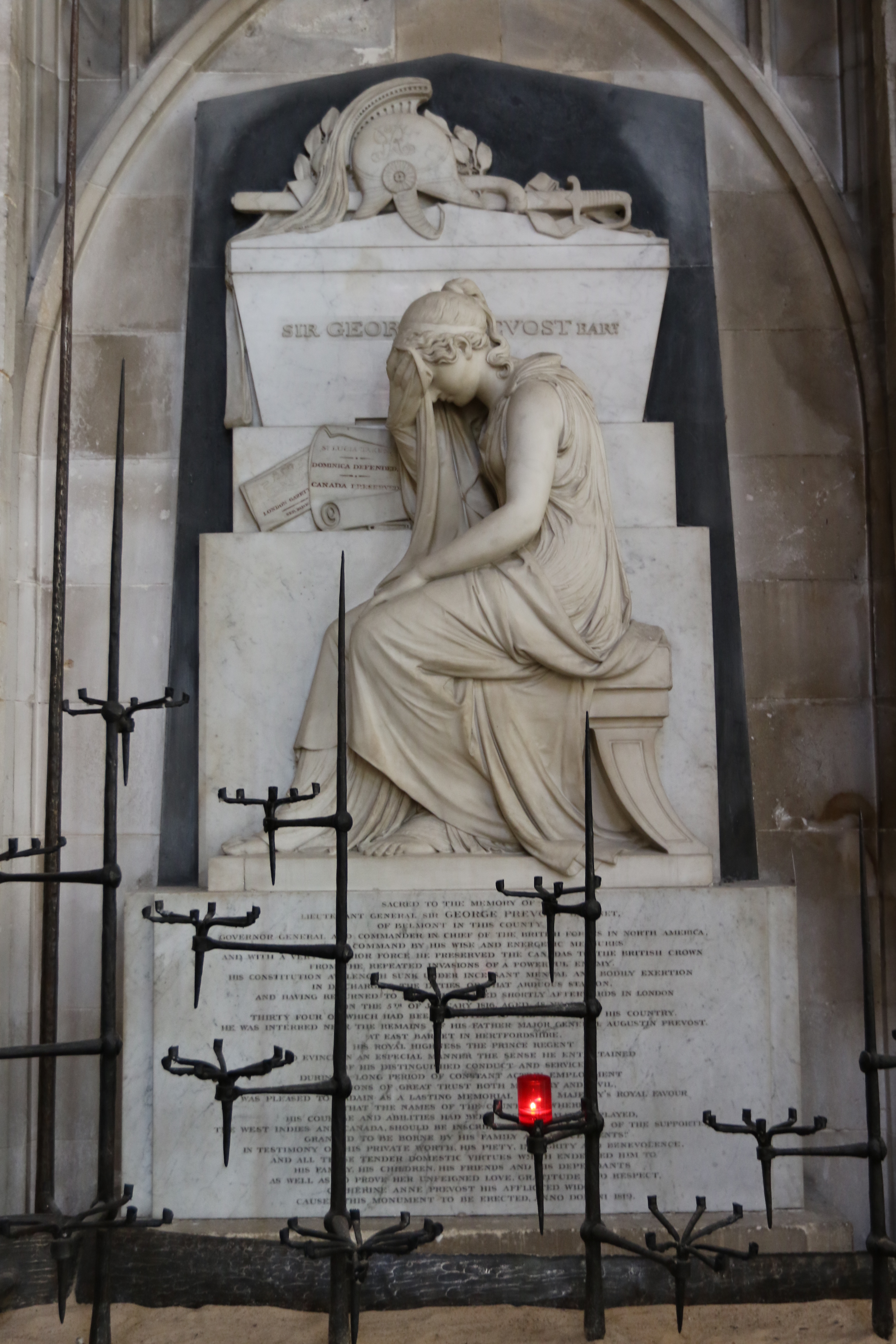
Memorial in Winchester Cathedral

On his return to England, the Government and Army authorities at first accepted Prevost's explanations for his conduct at Plattsburgh and during the War generally. Soon afterwards, the official naval despatch on the Battle of Plattsburgh was published, together with Yeo's complaints. Both these accounts blamed Prevost for the defeat at Plattsburgh. Prevost requested a court martial to clear his name. The trial was set for 12 January 1816, the delay being necessary to allow witnesses to travel from Canada, but Prevost was already in ill health and died a week before it was due to convene. His widow declined the offer of a peerage in honour of her husband, as she did not consider herself and her family to have sufficient means to support the dignity.

Later historians judge Prevost's preparations for defending the Canadas with limited means to be energetic, well conceived, and comprehensive, and against the odds he had achieved the primary objective of preventing an American conquest.

For although he was strategically inflexible and proved a hopeless field commander, as commander-in-chief facing overwhelming odds in the early years of the war he performed well; his sound political and administrative abilities formed the basis of success.

Prevost is buried in the church of St Mary the Virgin, East Barnet, North London, England.

== Honours ==
A schooner HMS Sir George Prevost was named in his honour in 1813.

In 1819 a monument to his memory, sculpted by Francis Chantrey, was erected in Winchester Cathedral.

In 2016, Prevost was named a National Historic Person by the Canadian government.

== Arms ==
Coat of arms of George Prevost
Crest A demi-lion rampant Azure charged upon the shoulder with a mural crown Or the sinister paw grasping a sword erect proper pommel and hilt Or Escutcheon Azure a dexter arm in fesse issuing from the sinister fesse point the hand grasping a sword erect proper pommel and hilt Or in chief two mullets Argent Supporters On each side, a grenadier of the 16th or Bedfordshire Regiment of Foot, each supporting a banner; that on the dexter side inscribed "WEST INDIES;" and on the sinister "CANADA" (Note: Supporters are typically an honour afforded peers of the realm as well as "Knights of the Garter, Thistle, and St. Patrick, and to Knights Grand Cross and Knights Grand Commanders of all other orders of knighthood to be borne for life." Prevost was none of these, however, supporters can also be granted as an honour for exceptional service. In 1818, shortly after Precost's death, the Prince Regent granted the supporters described here to Prevost's widow and his successors in recognition for his military services in British North America.) Motto SERVATUM CINERI (Latin for 'Faith kept with the dead') Other elements Red hand of Ulster baronet badge

== Notes ==
Military offices
Preceded by John Hope	GOC South-West District; 1805–1808	Succeeded by Arthur Whetham
Preceded by The Duke of Kent and Strathearn	Commander-in-Chief, North America; 1811	Succeeded by The Lord Seaton
Preceded by Sir Charles Green, Bt	Colonel of the 16th (Bedfordshire) Regiment; 1814–1816	Succeeded by Hugh Mackay Gordon
Preceded by Sir Thomas Musgrave, 7th Baronet	Colonel of the 76th Regiment of Foot; 1813–1814	Succeeded by Christopher Chowne
Political offices
Preceded by Sir John Wentworth	Lieutenant-Governor of Nova Scotia; 1808–1811	Succeeded by Sir John Coape Sherbrooke
Preceded by Sir James Henry Craig	Governor General of British North America; 1812–1815	Succeeded by Sir John Coape Sherbrooke
Baronetage of the United Kingdom
New creation	Baronet (of Belmont); 1805–1816	Succeeded by Sir George Prevost
