= Walter Wardle =

Walter Thomas Wardle (born Southsea 22 July 1900; died 12 February 1982) was Archdeacon of Gloucester from 1949 until his death.

Wardle was educated at Pembroke College, Oxford; and Ripon College Cuddesdon. He was ordained Deacon in 1926; and Priest in 1927. After a curacy at Weeke he was an SPG Chaplain at Montana, Switzerland He was Rector of Wolferton with Babingley from 1929 to 1938; Vicar of Great Barrington and Little Barrington with Taynton, 1938 to 1943; and Vicar of Charlton Kings from 1943 to 1948 when he became a Canon Residentiary at Gloucester Cathedral, a post he held for the rest of his life.

Wardle was a Freemason, and a member of the Apollo University Lodge, Oxford, under the United Grand Lodge of England.

Church of England titles
Preceded by Augustine John Hodson	Archdeacon of Gloucester; 1949–1982	Succeeded by Christopher Wagstaff
