= John Gregory (priest) =

17th-century Anglican priest

- Archdeacon of Gloucester
- Church: Church of England
- Diocese: Diocese of Gloucester
- In office: 1673–1678

Personal details
- Died: December 10, 1678
- Denomination: Anglican
- Parents: Francis Gregory (father)
- Occupation: Anglican priest; schoolmaster
- Education: Pembroke College, Cambridge

John Gregory was an Anglican priest in the 17th century.

He was the son of Francis Gregory of Oxford. Gregory became schoolmaster of the cathedral school at Gloucester in 1660 He took his BA from Pembroke College, Cambridge in 1667 and his BA in 1672. He held livings at Hempsted and Dursley and was Archdeacon of Gloucester from 1673 until his death on 10 December 1678.
