= Geoffrey Sidaway =

Geoffrey Harold Sidaway (28 October 1942 – 20 April 2014) was Archdeacon of Gloucester from 2000 until 2012.

Sidaway studied for ordination at Kelham Theological College and was priested in 1967. After curacies in Beighton and Chesterfield he was Vicar of St Bartholomew, Derby from 1972 to 1977. He was Vicar of St Martin, Maidstone from 1977 to 1986; and Bearsted and Thurnham from 1986 to 2000. He was a Canon Residentiary at Gloucester Cathedral from 2007 to 2012; and Priest in charge of Highnam, Lassington, Rudford, Tibberton and Taynton from 2013 until his death.

Church of England titles
Preceded by Christopher Wagstaff	Archdeacon of Gloucester; 2000–2012	Succeeded by Jackie Searle
