= Hugh Robinson (priest) =

The Venerable Hugh Robinson, D.D. was an Anglican priest in the first half of the 17th century.

GRobinson was born in Anglesey and educated at New College, Oxford. He held livings at Caerhun, Dursley Trefriw and Bighton. Robinson was Archdeacon of Gloucester from 1634 until his death on 30 March 1655.
