= Hugh G. Robinson =

African American general officer

- Born: Hugh Granville Robinson; August 4, 1932; Washington, D.C.
- Died: March 1, 2010 (aged 77); Dallas, Texas
- Education: United States Military Academy, Massachusetts Institute of Technology
- Awards: Air Medal, Bronze Star Medal, Legion of Merit, Commendation Medal

Hugh Granville Robinson (August 4, 1932 - March 1, 2010) was the first African American general officer in the United States Army Corps of Engineers and a decorated veteran of the Vietnam War. Robinson served as the military aide to President Lyndon B. Johnson, the first African American to hold such a position.

== Early life and education ==
Robinson was born on August 4, 1932, in Washington, D.C. His father, Colonel James H. Robinson, was a career Army officer. Robinson graduated from Dunbar High School and later attended the United States Military Academy. Upon graduating in 1954, Robinson was commissioned in the United States Army Corps of Engineers and attended the Massachusetts Institute of Technology where he earned a Master's Degree in Civil Engineering in 1959. He later completed the Harvard Business School Management Program for Executives and was awarded an honorary Doctor of Laws degree from Williams College.

== Career ==
=== Military career ===
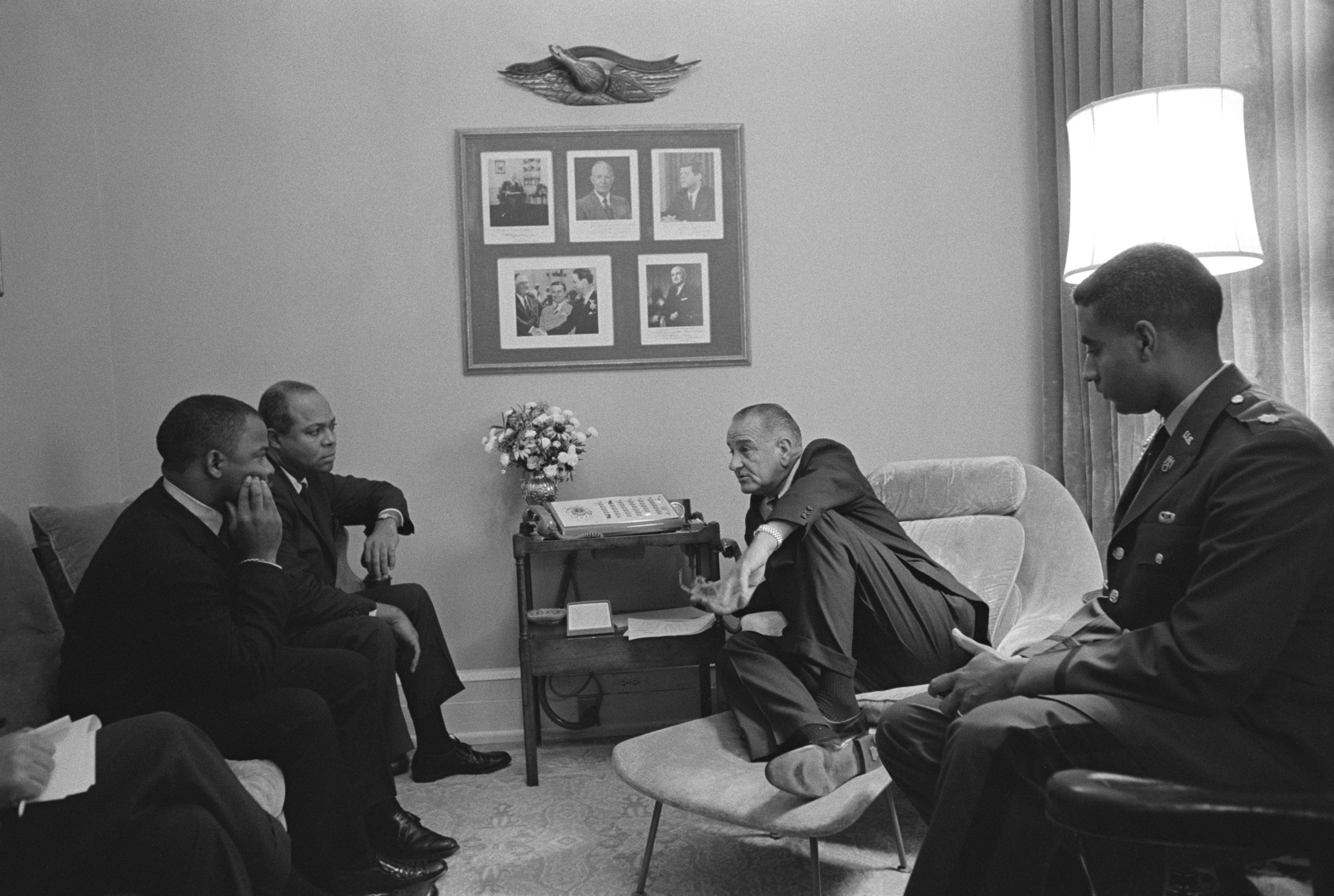
Left to right: John Lewis, James Farmer, President Lyndon B. Johnson, and Robinson

Robinson served in the military between 1954 and 1983. After a tour of duty in Korea and time holding various Army staff positions, Robinson worked for the deputy chief of staff for operations at The Pentagon. In 1965, President Lyndon B. Johnson appointed Robinson as his military aide. Robinson served in this position throughout the remaining duration of Johnson's term as President.

Upon leaving the White House, Robinson served in Vietnam as the deputy group commander of the 45th Engineer Group and as commander of the 39th Engineer Battalion. In recognition of his service, he received an Air Medal, a Bronze Star Medal, the Legion of Merit and a Commendation Medal.

Robinson returned to West Point in 1972 to serve as the 3rd Regimental Tactical officer, where he was tasked with developing and training cadets. He was later promoted to Colonel and then Brigadier General in 1978, in which he became the first African American general officer in the United States Army Corps of Engineers. He was again promoted in 1980 to Major General and was assigned the responsibility of commanding the Corps of Engineers' Southwestern Division. He held this position until his retirement from the military in 1983.

=== Post-military career ===
Following his time in the military, Robinson held various executive and corporate board positions. This included acting as Chief Executive Officer of the Tetra Group and Chief Operating Officer of Nova Energy. For seven years, Robinson served as vice chairman and then chairman of the Federal Reserve Bank of Dallas. Robinson was also involved in civic affairs, founder of the Dallas Youth Services Corps and co-chairman of Dallas Promise.
