= George Savage (priest) =

Anglican priest in the late 16th and early 17th centuries

The Venerable George Savage was an Anglican priest in the late 16th and early 17th centuries.

Savage was educated at Christ Church, Oxford. He held livings at Sedgeberrow, Tolleshunt Major, Saintbury and Dursley Robinson was Archdeacon of Gloucester from 1575 until his death in 1602.
