= Robert Parsons (archdeacon) =

Robert Parsons was an English priest in the late 16th and early 17th centuries.

Parsons was educated at University College, Oxford. He held livings at Shabbington, Waddesdon and Oddington. He was Archdeacon of Gloucester from 1703 until his death on 8 July 1714.
