= Prevost baronets =

Set index for Prevost baronets

There have been two baronetcies create for persons named Prevost (pronounced "Prev-o") in the Baronetage of the United Kingdom, with one extant as of 2023.

- Prevost baronets of Belmont (1805)
- Prevost baronets of Westbourne Terrace, London (1903): see Sir Augustus Prevost, 1st Baronet (1837–1913)
