= George Savage (Scottish footballer) =

Scottish footballer

Personal information
- Full name: George Savage
- Place of birth: Scotland
- Position: Right back

Youth career
- St Mungo's Academy

Senior career*
| Years | Team | Apps | (Gls) |
| 1951 | Manchester United | 0 | (0) |
- St Mungo's Academy Former Pupils
| 1955–1956 | Queen's Park | 3 | (0) |
| 1957 | Third Lanark | 2 | (0) |
| 1959 | Montreal Canadian Alouettes | | |

International career
| 1954–1958 | Scotland Amateurs | 6 | (0) |
- * Club domestic league appearances and goals

George Savage was a Scottish amateur footballer who played as a right back in the Scottish League for Queen's Park and Third Lanark. He was capped by Scotland at amateur level and later played in Canada.

== Honours ==
Montreal Canadian Alouettes

- Carling Cup: 1959
