= Great Casterton Road Banks =

- Site of Special Scientific Interest
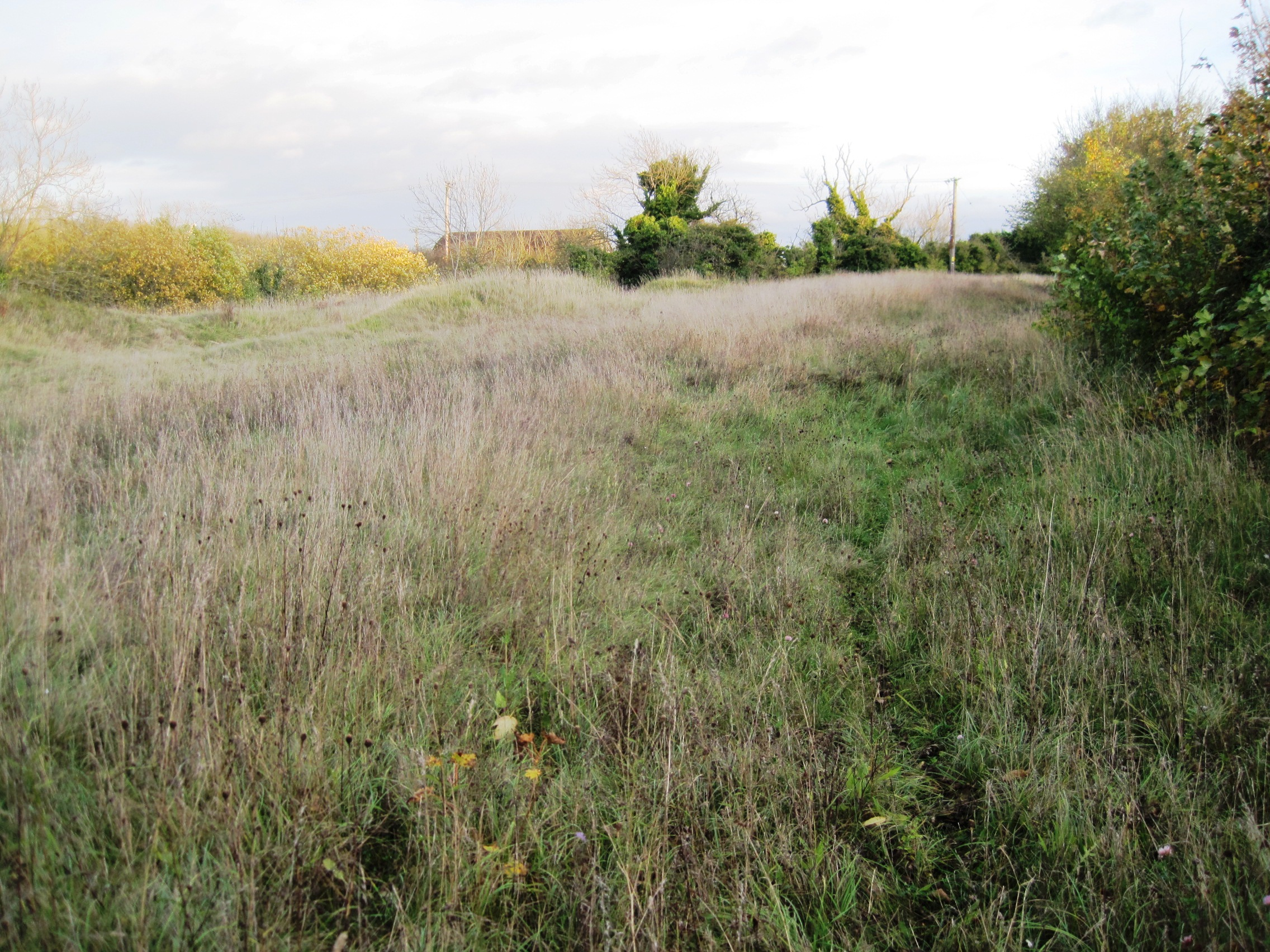

- Location within Lincolnshire
- Location of Great Casterton Road Banks.
- Area of search: Lincolnshire
- Grid reference: TF 005 083
- Coordinates: 52.663°N 0.514°W
- Interest: Biological
- Area: 0.4 hectares (0.99 acres)
- Notification date: 1985
- Location map: Magic Map

Great Casterton Road Banks is a 0.4-hectare (0.99-acre) biological Site of Special Scientific Interest on the western outskirts of Stamford in Lincolnshire. It is managed by the Lincolnshire Wildlife Trust.

This small site has calcareous grassland on Eastern Jurassic Limestone, and it is dominated by upright brome and tor-grass. It is the only site in the county which has sulphur clover, and it has two other regionally rare species, greater broomrape and perennial flax.

There is access from Old Great North Road.
