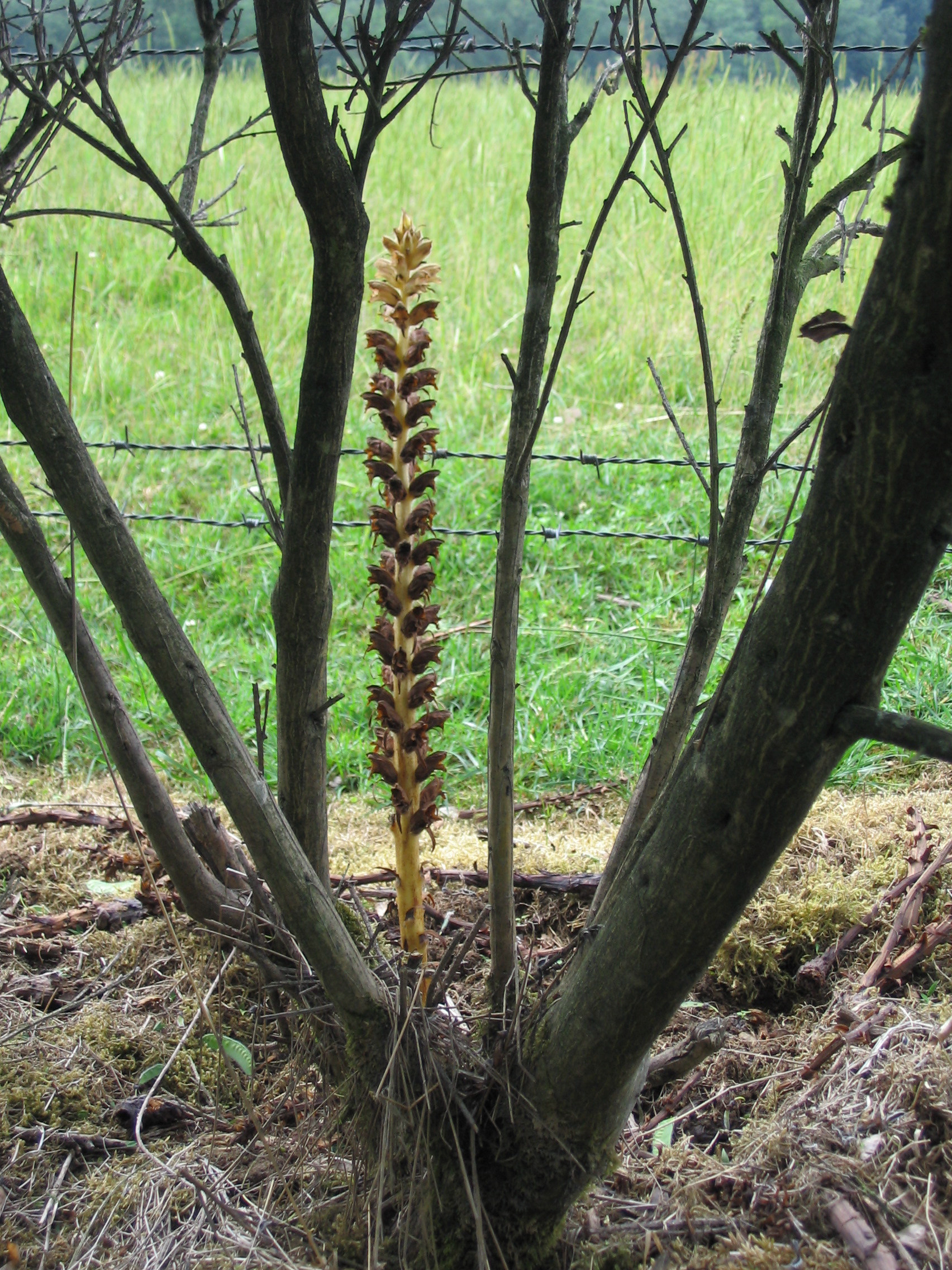
- Orobanche rapum-genistae growing on the roots of common broom

Scientific classification
- Kingdom: Plantae
- Clade: Tracheophytes
- Clade: Angiosperms
- Clade: Eudicots
- Clade: Asterids
- Order: Lamiales
- Family: Orobanchaceae
- Genus: Orobanche
- Species: O. rapum-genista

Binomial name
- Orobanche rapum-genista Thuill. Fl. env. Paris ed. 2, 317. 1799

Subspecies
- O. r. subsp. benthamii O. r. subsp. rapum-genistae O. r. subsp. rigens

= Orobanche rapum-genistae =

Species of plant (greater broomrape)

Orobanche rapum-genistae, the greater broomrape, is a plant species in the genus Orobanche. It is a parasitic plant, native to Europe, growing on the roots of plants in the bean family, usually common broom or European gorse.

== Description ==
The broomrapes are perennial, parasitic plants which contain no chlorophyll and are totally dependent on other plants to provide their nutrients. The greater broomrape can grow to a height of 3 ft (1 m) with a honey-brown downy stem, persisting as a dark brown dead spike after flowering. The leaves are represented by small pointed scales, concentrated near the base of the stem, and there is a single bract, which is longer than the flower, below each flower. These have a corolla with two lips, four stamens and a curved-down style. The upper lip is hooded and the lower lip has three lobes, the central one being the largest. The fruits are egg-shaped and enclosed in the dead flowerhead, and the seeds are minute.

== Distribution and habitat ==
The greater broomrape is a parasitic plant, growing on the roots of leguminous shrubs, and is to be found only where its host plants are found; these are usually European gorse or common broom, but occasionally it grows on dyer's greenweed. It has a suboceanic, southern-temperate distribution, in Western Europe and North Africa; in France, the Netherlands and Belgium it is widespread, but in Germany it occurs mainly in the west, and in Switzerland in montane and sub-alpine settings. It occurs all over Italy, and is present in Corsica and Algeria. In Britain it is present in scattered locations, mostly in Wales, Southwest England and near the coast in South England. It was in decline in the 18th and early 19th centuries, but more recently has staged a revival. It grows in the Great Casterton Road Banks, an SSSI in Lincolnshire.

== Chemistry ==
Orobanche rapum-genistae contains verbascoside and orobanchoside.

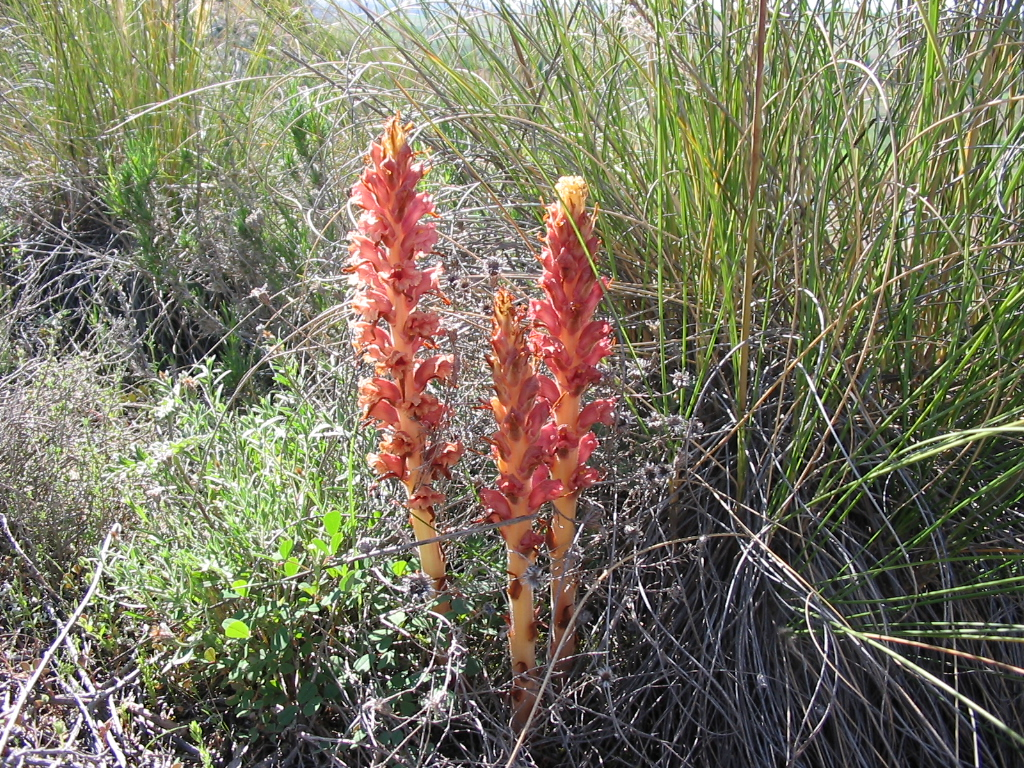
Flowers

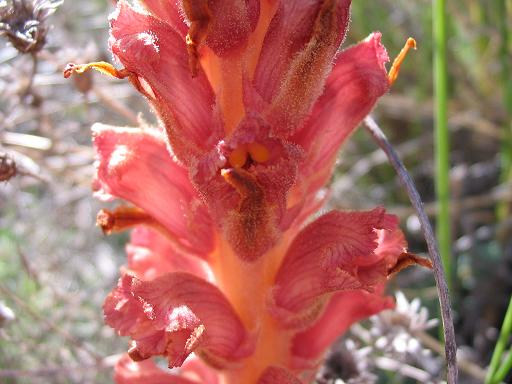
Detail flower

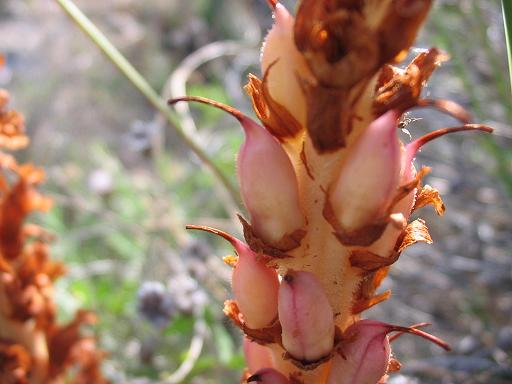
Detail fruit

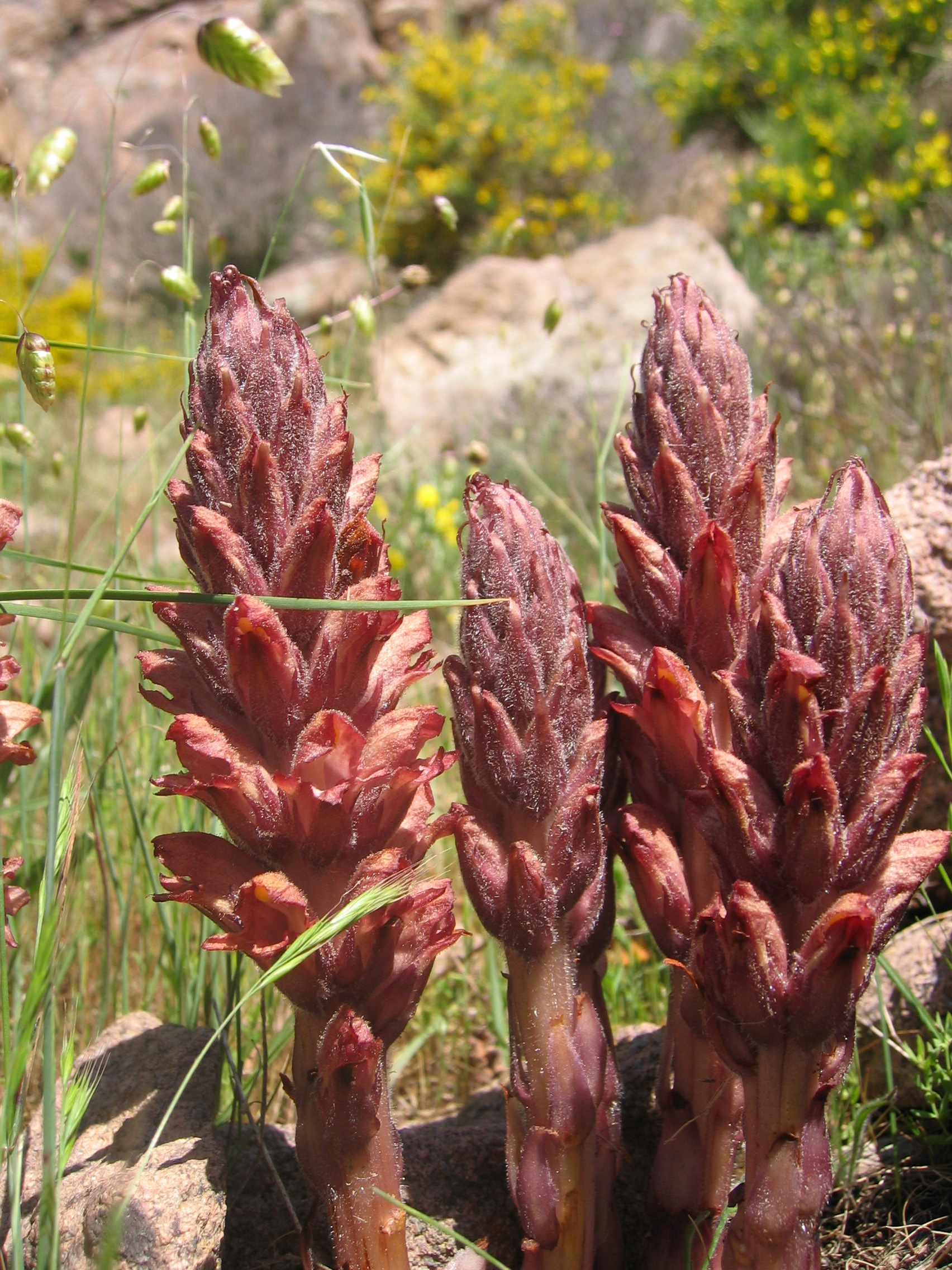

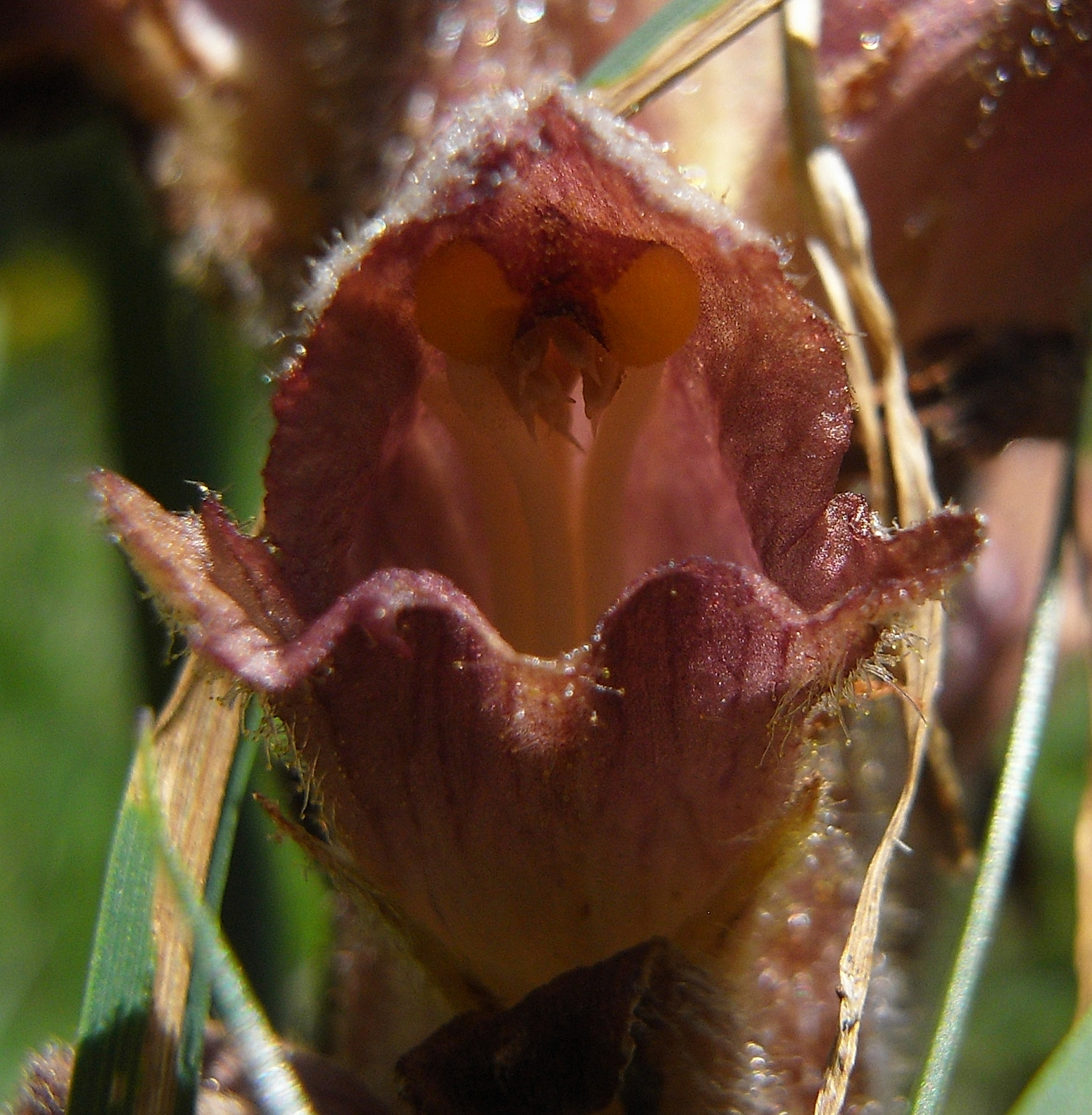
