= Sir George Prevost, 2nd Baronet =

The Venerable Sir George Prevost, 2nd Baronet (1804–1893) was an English churchman, a Tractarian who became Archdeacon of Gloucester in 1865.

== Life ==
The only son of Sir George Prevost, 1st Baronet, by Catherine Anne, daughter of Major-general John Phipps, he was born at Roseau on Dominica on 20 August 1804. He succeeded to the baronetcy on 5 January 1816. Matriculated at Oriel College, Oxford on 23 January 1821, he graduated B.A., taking a second class in literæ humaniores, and a first class in the mathematical school in 1825. He proceeded M.A. in 1827; was ordained deacon in 1828, and then priest in 1829.

Prevost was a pupil and disciple of John Keble, whom he frequently visited at Southrop; there he met Isaac Williams, whose sister Jane he married on 18 March 1828. Through life he was on good terms with his old college friend Samuel Wilberforce. He was curate to Thomas Keble at Bisley, Gloucestershire, from 1828 to 1834, when he was instituted on 25 September to the perpetual curacy of Stinchcombe in the same county.

Prevost was rural dean of Dursley from 1852 to 1866, and Honorary Chaplain of the 11th (Dursley) Gloucestershire Rifle Volunteer Corps, proctor of the diocese of Gloucester and Bristol from 1858 to 1865, archdeacon of Gloucester from 1865 to 1881, and honorary canon of Gloucester Cathedral from 1859 until his death at Stinchcombe on 18 March 1893. He was buried in Stinchcombe churchyard on 23 March.

== Works ==
Prevost, retiring by nature, was a consistent supporter of the Oxford movement, and contributed to Tracts for the Times. He translated the Homilies of John Chrysostom on the Gospel of Matthew for the Library of the Fathers Oxford, 1843, 3 vols. He edited the Autobiography of Isaac Williams, London, 1892, and printed his archidiaconal charges and some sermons.

== Family ==
By his wife Jane Williams, who died on 17 January 1853, Prevost had issue two sons: George Phipps (1830–1885), who held a colonel's commission in the army; and Charles, the third baronet (died 1902).

== Notes ==
Attribution

This article incorporates text from a publication now in the public domain: Lee, Sidney, ed. (1896). "Prevost, George (1804-1893)". Dictionary of National Biography. Vol. 46. London: Smith, Elder & Co.

Baronetage of the United Kingdom
| Preceded by George Prevost | Baronet (of Belmont); 1816–1893 | Succeeded by Charles Prevost |
