= Guy Etton =

Anglican priest

The Venerable Guy Etton was an Anglican priest in the late 16th and early 17th centuries.

He was educated at the University of Oxford. He held livings at St. James the Elder, Horton, Gloucestershire and St. Leonard, Shoreditch. He was Archdeacon of Gloucester from 1559 to 1571. He died in 1577.
