= Archdeacon of Gloucester =

Church of England ecclesiastical office

The Archdeacon of Gloucester is a senior ecclesiastical officer in the Diocese of Gloucester, England whose responsibilities include the care of clergy and church buildings within the area of the Archdeaconry of Gloucester.

== History ==
The first recorded archdeacons of the Diocese of Worcester occur from c. 1086 – the same sort of time that archdeacons occur across the church in England. Two archdeacons are recorded simultaneously from that time, but no clear territorial title occurs until 1143, when Gervase is called Archdeacon of Gloucester.

The archdeaconry was within Worcester diocese for almost 500 years, until it was formed into the newly created Diocese of Gloucester on 13 September 1541, as part of the Henrician reformation. The new diocese was briefly dissolved and returned to Worcester again on 20 May 1552 until Worcester and Gloucester were re-divided again at by Queen Mary in 1554. From 5 October 1836, when the diocese was merged with Bristol and 9 July 1897, when Bristol became an independent diocese again, the archdeaconry was in the Diocese of Gloucester and Bristol. Parts of Gloucester archdeaconry were used to create the Cirencester archdeaconry (since renamed Cheltenham) on 8 December 1882.

The archdeaconry consists of the deaneries of Forest, Gloucester City, Severn Vale, Stroud, & Wotton.

== List of archdeacons ==
=== High Medieval ===
Junior archdeacon of the diocese:

- bef. 1112–bef. 1114: Hugh (probably became senior archdeacon)
- bef. 1114–aft. 1115: Richard (possibly same man as Richard I)
- bef. 1122–aft. 1140: Thurstan
- bef. 1134–aft. 1134: Richard (I; possibly same man as above Richard; probably vice-archdeacon)

Archdeacons of Gloucester:

- bef. 1143–aft. 1151: Gervase
- bef. 1148–bef. 1157: Richard (I; again; probably vice-archdeacon)
- bef. 1160–bef. 1178 (d.): Matthew
- bef. 1178–1186 (res.): William of Northall
- bef. 1187–aft. 1190: Robert de Inglesham (also Archdeacon of Surrey, bef. 1159–aft. 1178)
- bef. 1191–1200 (d.): Richard (II)
- 1200–September 1200 (res.): John de Gray (Archdeacon of Cleveland at same or similar time)
- bef. 1201–7 May 1210 (d.): William de Verdun
- bef. 1211–27 May 1245 (deprived): Maurice de Arundel
- bef. 1245–bef. 1248 (res.): William Lupus/Le Loup
- 1248–bef. 1254 (d.): Thomas
- bef. 1256–aft. 1270: Hugh de Cantilupe, 2nd son of William II de Cantilupe (d.1251), 2nd feudal baron of Eaton Bray in Bedfordshire, and elder brother of Saint Thomas de Cantilupe (c. 1218–1282), Bishop of Hereford;
- aft. 1274–6 March 1288 (d.): Robert de Fangfoss
- 11 September 1288–bef. 1295: John Devereux/de Ebroicis
- 23 July 1295–bef. 1308 (d.): Walter de Burdon

=== Late Medieval ===
- 6 June 1309 – 1317 (d.): William de Birstone
- 16 November 1317–bef. 1318 (res.): Nicholas de Hungate
- 3 June 1318 – 21 May 1328 (exch.): Hugh de Statherne
- 21 May 1328–bef. 1331 (res.): Joceus de Kinebauton
- 25 May–21 June 1331 (res.): John de Uske
- 21 June 1331 – 7 April 1348 (res.): Roger de Breynton
- 7 April 1348 – 15 March 1355 (exch.): Richard de Ledbury
- 15 March 1355 – 1368 (d.): Thomas de Stratford
- bef. 1139–5 September 1369 (exch.): Roger Peres
- 5 September 1369 – 1380 (res.): William de Thirsford
- 15 December 1380 – 3 March 1395 (exch.): Nicholas Geyell
- 3 March 1395–bef. 1404 (d.): Richard Winchcombe
- 5 November 1406–April 1428 (d.): Nicholas Herbury
- 21 April 1428–bef. 1462 (d.): Philip Polton
- 8 March–August 1462 (res.): John Kingscote
- bef. 1463–bef. 1482 (d.): John Segden
- 18 June 1482–aft. 1487: Robert Morton (also Bishop of Worcester from 1486)
- 26 December 1487–bef. 1489 (d.): John Dunmoe
- 12 February 1489 – 1497 (res.): Giovanni de' Gigli (John de Gigliis)
- 9 February 1498 – 1503 (res.): Geoffrey Blythe
- 7 December 1503 – 1509 (res.): Thomas Ruthall
- bef. 1512–aft. 1517: Peter Carmelian
- bef. 1529–aft. 1539 (res.): John Bell
- 10 February 1540–aft. 1544: Nicholas Wotton (also Dean of York from 1544)

=== Early modern ===
From 13 September 1541, the archdeaconry was part of the Diocese of Gloucester.
From 20 May 1552 until 1554, the archdeaconry was temporarily returned to Worcester diocese.

- 1552–August 1559 (d.): John Williams
- 9 October 1559 – 29 January 1575 (res.): Guy Etton
- 1 February 1575–bef. 1602 (d.): George Savage
- 1 September 1602–bef. 1606 (d.): Robert Hill
- 28 February 1607 – 14 June 1634 (d.): Samuel Burton
- 25 June 1634–bef. 1660 (d.): Hugh Robinson
- 7 August 1660–?: John Middleton
- ?–26 December 1671 (d.): Edward Pope
- 1671 - 1673 Thomas Vyner
- 1673–10 December 1678 (d.): John Gregory
- 13 December 1678–bef. 1703 (d.): Thomas Hyde
- 10 March 1703–bef. 1714 (d.): Robert Parsons
- 29 July 1714 – 29 October 1737 (d.): Nathaniel Lye
- 11 February 1738 – 22 July 1767 (d.): William Geekie
- 27 August 1767 – 1774 (res.): Richard Hurd
- 23 December 1774 – 3 June 1804 (d.): James Webster
- 23 July 1804–bef. 1814 (res.): Timothy Stonhouse Vigor
- 31 March 1814 – 3 March 1825 (d.): Thomas Rudge
- 14 May 1825 – 8 December 1864 (d.): John Timbrill

When Bristol was merged into the diocese on 5 October 1836, the diocese was renamed to Gloucester and Bristol.

=== Late modern ===
- 1865–1881 (ret.): George Prévost
- 1881–1902 (ret.): John Sheringham

With the re-erection of Bristol diocese on 9 July 1897, Gloucester archdeaconry was once again in the Diocese of Gloucester.

- 1902–1903 (res.): John Bowers
- 1903–8 February 1917 (d.): Edward Scobell
- 1917–1919 (res.): Walter Hobhouse
- 1919–1933 (res.): Charles Ridsdale
- 1933–1948 (res.): Austin Hodson (also Bishop suffragan of Tewkesbury from 1938)
- 1949–12 February 1982 (d.): Walter Wardle
- 1982–2000 (ret.): Christopher Wagstaff (afterwards archdeacon emeritus)
- 2000–31 May 2012 (ret.): Geoffrey Sidaway
- 12 September 2012 – 27 September 2018 (res.): Jackie Searle (became Bishop of Crediton)
- 27 January 2019 – present: Hilary Dawson (retirement scheduled for 19 December 2025)

== Sources ==
- Greenway, Diana E. (1971), Fasti Ecclesiae Anglicanae 1066–1300, vol. 2, pp. 104–105
- Greenway, Diana E. (1971), Fasti Ecclesiae Anglicanae 1066–1300, vol. 2, pp. 107–109
- Jones, B. (1963), Fasti Ecclesiae Anglicanae 1300–1541, vol. 4, pp. 60–62
- Horn, Joyce M. (1996), Fasti Ecclesiae Anglicanae 1541–1857, vol. 8, pp. 47–49
- Gloucestershire County Council archive – Diocese of Gloucester, 1541–2009 – Bishop and Archdeacons
