= Edward Pope (priest) =

English priest

Edward Pope (c. 1602–1671) was a Church of England minister.

== Life ==
Pope was born in Berkshire and educated at Magdalen College, Oxford. He was Rector of Walton-on-the-Hill, Surrey from 1640. In 1662 he was appointed to Dursley, Gloucestershire by Bishop William Nicholson, another Magdalen man, and became Archdeacon of Gloucester in 1666. He held all three positions until his death at Walton on St. Stephen's day, 1671. He was buried at Walton, where a memorial was erected to his memory.
