= Thomas Rudge =

Thomas Rudge (baptised 1753 – 1825) was an English churchman, topographer and antiquarian, Archdeacon of Gloucester from 1814, and chancellor of the diocese of Hereford from 1817.

== Life ==
The son of Thomas Rudge of Gloucester, Thomas Rudge the younger entered Merton College, Oxford, on 7 April 1770 at aged 16. He graduated with a B.A. degree in 1780. St. Rudge received a master's degree from Worcester College, Oxford in 1783 and a B.D. in 1784.

Rudge was appointed rector of St. Michael's Church and St. Mary-de-Grace Church, Gloucester. With the support of Philip Yorke, 2nd Earl of Hardwicke, Rudge became vicar of Haresfield, Gloucestershire.

In 1814, Rudge was appointed archdeacon of Gloucester. In 1817, he was made chancellor of the diocese of Hereford.

Rudge was a strong proponent of Enclosure, arguing that it would increase agricultural productivity. He also advocated ways to increase the availability of labour for landowners, by reducing access for the rural population to Commons and private gardens. "The greatest of evils to agriculture would be to place the labourer in a state of independence, and thus destroy the indispensable gradations of society. .... The size of a cottager's garden ... ought not to be extended to occupy too great a portion of the labourer's time: nor ... to raise the lower orders to a situation of comparative independence."

Rudge died in 1825.

== Works ==
Rudge published:

- The History of the County of Gloucester, compressed and brought down to the year 1803, 2 vols., Gloucester, 1803.
- A General View of the Agriculture of the County of Gloucester, 1807.
- The history and antiquities of Gloucester, from the earliest period to the present time: &c., 1811.

== See also ==
- Samuel Rudder

== Notes ==
Attribution

This article incorporates text from a publication now in the public domain: Lee, Sidney, ed. (1897). "Rudge, Thomas". Dictionary of National Biography. Vol. 49. London: Smith, Elder & Co.
