= Brian Pope =

England international rugby union player

- Born: Edward Brian Pope; 29 June 1911 Barnet, England
- Died: 19 August 2011 (aged 100)
- School: Uppingham School
- University: Clare College, Cambridge

Rugby union career
- Position: Scrum-half
Amateur team(s)
Years	Team	Apps	(Points)
- Cambridge University R.U.F.C.
–	Blackheath F.C.		
–	Barbarian F.C.		
International career
Years	Team	Apps	(Points)
1931	England	3	(0)

Edward Brian Pope (29 June 1911 – 19 August 2011) was an international rugby union scrum-half who played club rugby for Cambridge University and Blackheath. Pope played international rugby for England and invitational rugby for the Barbarians.

== Bibliography ==
- Godwin, Terry (1984). The International Rugby Championship 1883–1983. Grafton Street, London: Willow Books. ISBN 0-00-218060-X.
- Griffiths, John (1982). The Book of English International Rugby 1872–1982. London: Willow Books. ISBN 0002180065.
- Marshall, Howard; Jordon, J.P. (1951). Oxford v Cambridge, The Story of the University Rugby Match. London: Clerke & Cockeran.
