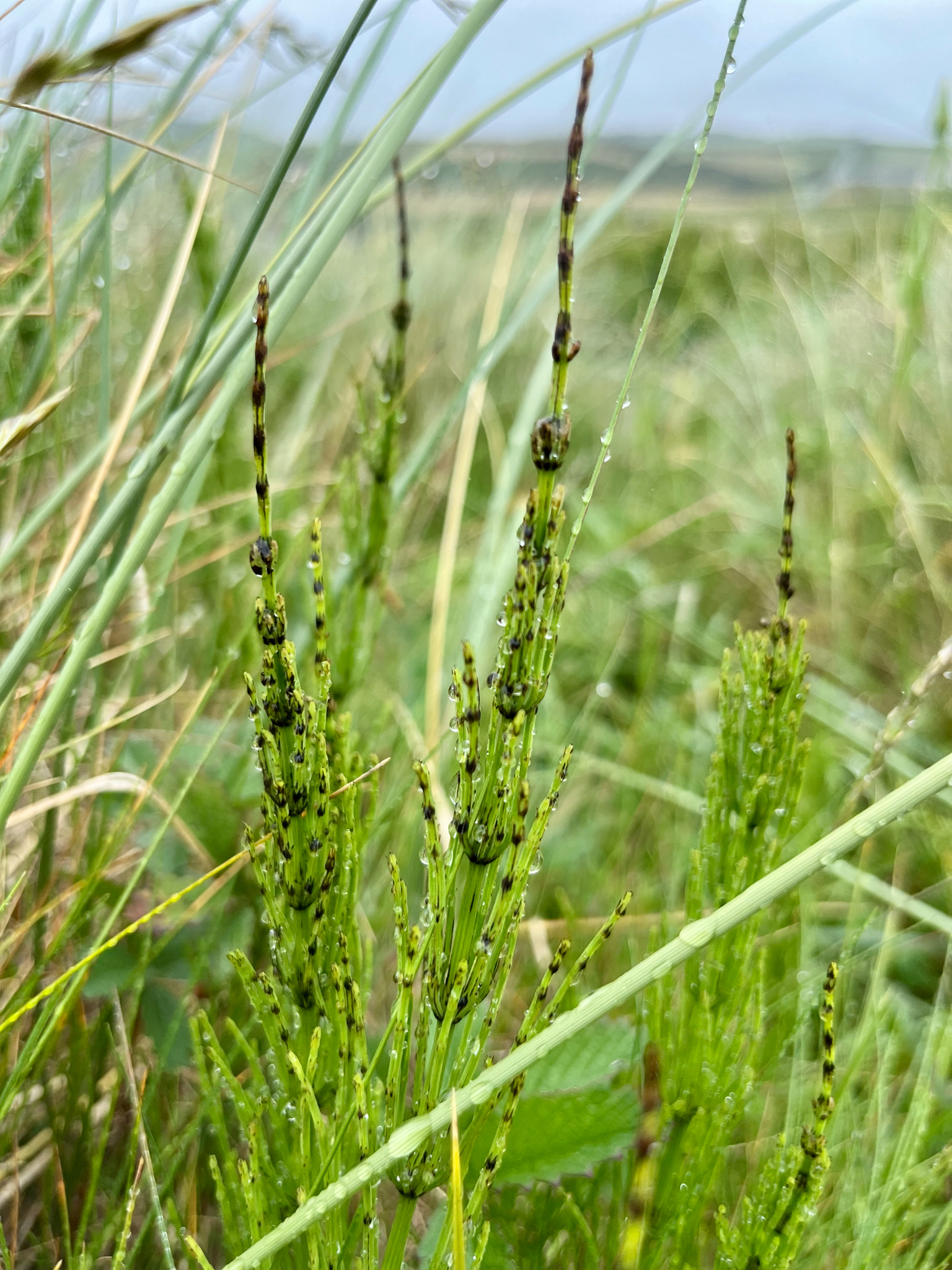
- Equisetum palustre

Conservation status
- Least Concern (IUCN 3.1)

- Secure (NatureServe)

Scientific classification
- Kingdom: Plantae
- Clade: Embryophytes
- Clade: Tracheophytes
- Division: Polypodiophyta
- Class: Polypodiopsida
- Subclass: Equisetidae
- Order: Equisetales
- Family: Equisetaceae
- Genus: Equisetum
- Subgenus: E. subg. Equisetum
- Species: E. palustre

Binomial name
- Equisetum palustre L.

Synonyms
- List: Equisetum aquatile Scheller, nom. superfl.; Equisetum arenarium Opiz; Equisetum hybridum Huter; Equisetum limosum var. minus Roth; Equisetum nodosum Hoppe; Equisetum palustre subvar. apiculatum Coss. & Germ.; Equisetum palustre var. americanum Vict.; Equisetum palustre var. aphyllum Lej.; Equisetum palustre var. apiculatum (Coss. & Germ.) Rouy; Equisetum palustre var. arcuatum Milde; Equisetum palustre var. collinum-tenerrimum Schur; Equisetum palustre var. japonicum Nakai; Equisetum palustre var. leptostachyum Wallr., nom. superfl.; Equisetum palustre var. membranaceum Lej.; Equisetum palustre var. microstachyum Schur; Equisetum palustre var. nanum Milde; Equisetum palustre var. nigridens H.St.John; Equisetum palustre var. nudum Duby, nom. illeg.; Equisetum palustre var. nudum Opiz; Equisetum palustre var. paludosum Schur; Equisetum palustre var. polystachion Gray; Equisetum palustre var. polystachyum A.Braun & Engelm., nom. illeg.; Equisetum palustre var. polystachyum Weigel; Equisetum palustre var. prostratum Brause, nom. illeg.; Equisetum palustre var. ramosissimum M.Peck; Equisetum palustre var. ramosum Opiz; Equisetum palustre var. ramulosum Milde; Equisetum palustre var. simplex Rupr.; Equisetum palustre var. simplicissimum A.Braun & Engelm.; Equisetum palustre var. szechuanense C.N.Page; Equisetum palustre var. tenue Döll; Equisetum palustre var. tenuissimum Gray; Equisetum torgesianum Rothm.; Equisetum tuberosum Hectot ex DC.; Equisetum veronense Pollini; Presla palustris (L.) Dulac

= Equisetum palustre =

Marsh horsetail

Species of vascular plant in the horsetail family

Equisetum palustre, the marsh horsetail, is a perennial herbaceous pteridophyte belonging to the subclass of horsetails (Equisetidae). It is widespread in cooler regions of Eurasia and North America.

== Description ==
Equisetum palustre has stems growing between 10-60 cm tall. The upright stems are usually scarcely branched with loose green leaf sheaths that have 5-10 narrow, dark teeth. The teeth are light at the edges. The lowest internode of the upright branches are much shorter than the leaf sheath of the stem.

The rough, furrowed stem is 1–3 mm diameter, with usually 8–10 ribs, in rare cases, 4–12; it bears a variable number of whorled branches.

The spores are spread by the wind (anemochory) and have four long ribbon-like structures attached to them. The spores sit on strobili which are rounded on the top. Marsh horsetails often form runners, with which they also can proliferate vegetatively.

== Taxonomy ==
Linnaeus was the first to describe marsh horsetail with the binomial Equisetum palustre in his Species Plantarum of 1753.

== Ecology ==
Equisetum palustre is green from spring to autumn and grows spores from June to September. It grows primarily in nutrient-rich wet meadows. It is found in Europe and the circumpolar region up to mountainous heights. Its distribution is declining.

In Finland, it has benefited from human action and grows often in road and track sides, ditches and especially peat based fields and pastures.

A specific plant association in which E. palustre is found is the Juncus subnodulosus-Cirsium palustre fen-meadow.

== Toxicity ==
Equisetum palustre is poisonous to mammals, most often reported as potentially fatal to horses, as it contains alkaloids palustrine and palustridiene, which destroy vitamin B_{1}. According to Wink, Equisetum palustre also contains thiaminase enzymes. It is also known to contain lesser amounts of nicotine. Many thiaminases, however, are denatured by heat, and some sources refer Equisetum palustre safe to eat in moderate amounts when properly cooked. In Finland, it used to lower the production of dairy when cows would eat them in place of other preferable fodder.

== Gallery ==
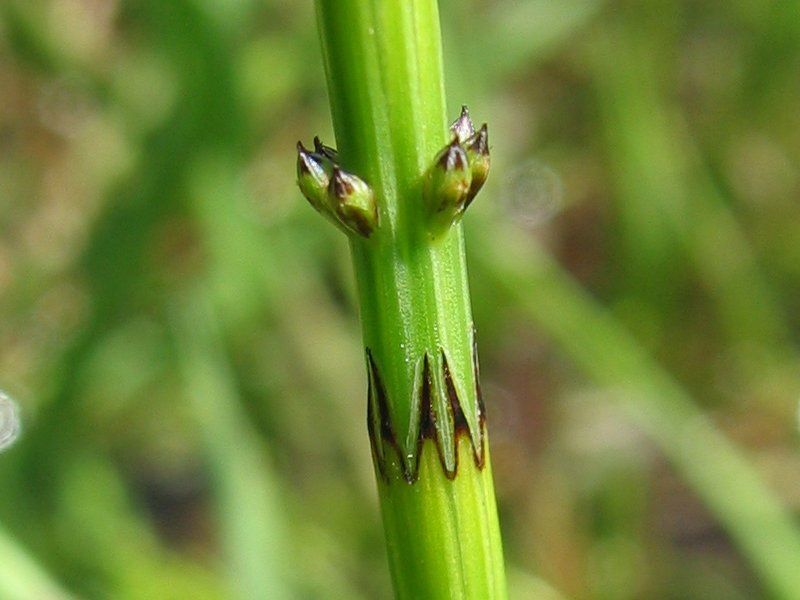
Close-up of marsh horsetail

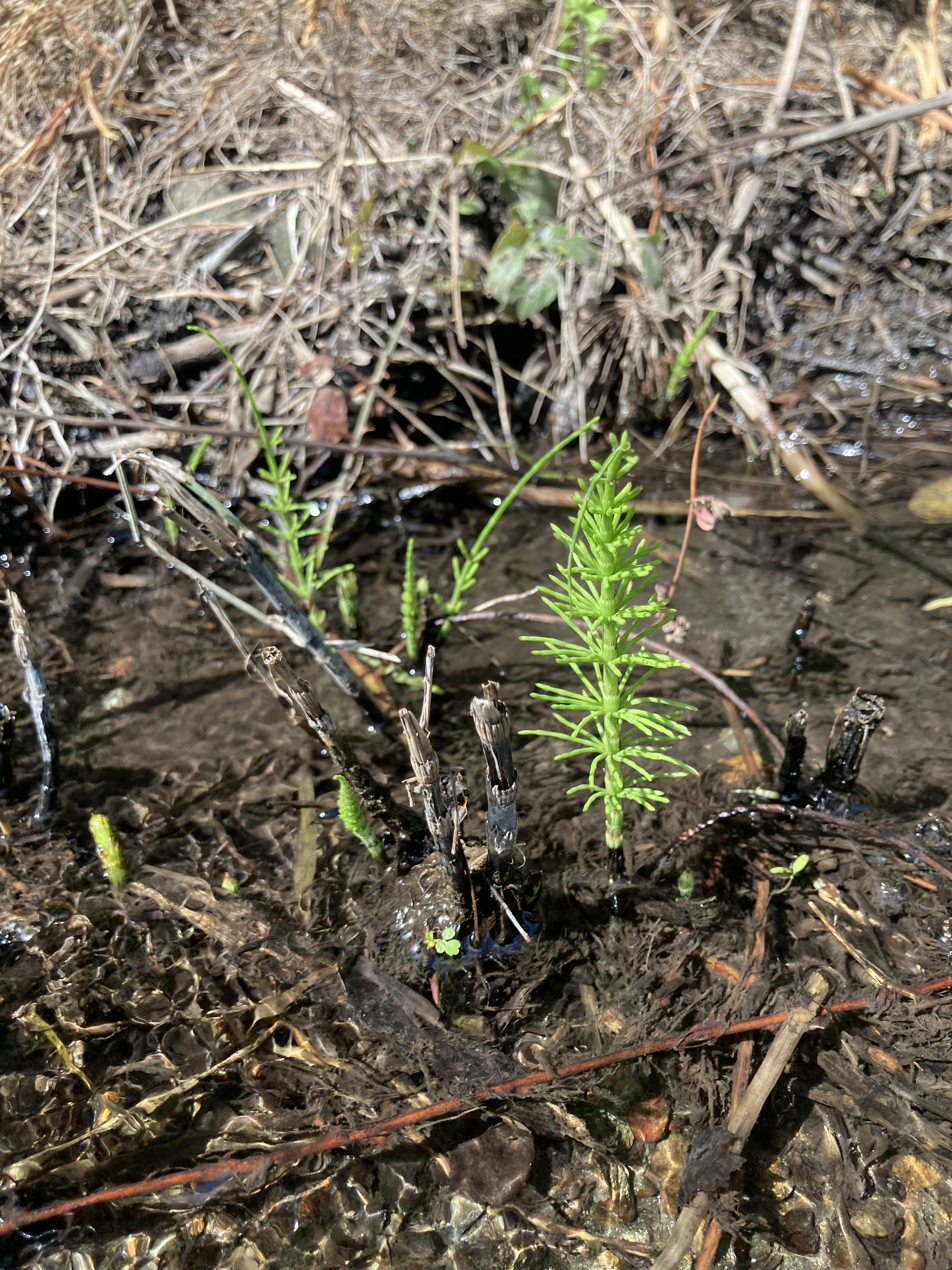
Marsh horsetail in Kythira
