= Grade I listed buildings in Rutland =

Rutland shown in England

There are over 9,000 Grade I listed buildings in England. This page is a list of the 28 of these buildings in the county of Rutland.

== Rutland ==
Name	Location	Type	Completed (Note: The date given is the date used by Historic England as significant for the initial building or that of an important part in the structure's description.)	Date designated	Grid ref. (Note: Sometimes known as OSGB36, the grid reference is based on the British national grid reference system used by the Ordnance Survey.) Geo-coordinates	Entry number (Note: The "List Entry Number" is a unique number assigned to each listed building and scheduled monument by Historic England.)	Image
Church of St Mary	Ashwell	Church	12th century	14 June 1954	SK8657213744; 52°42′52″N 0°43′12″W	1073268	Church of St Mary More images
Church of St Peter	Brooke	Parish Church	12th century	14 June 1954	SK8497705724; 52°38′33″N 0°44′44″W	1215370	Church of St Peter More images
Burley House, with wings, stables and colonnades	Burley-on-the-Hill	Country House	1694-1705	18 September 1984	SK8844710284; 52°40′59″N 0°41′35″W	1073792	Burley House, with wings, stables and colonnades More images
Church of St Mary	Edith Weston	Church	C12-C14	14 June 1954	SK9272305354; 52°38′17″N 0°37′52″W	1073962	Church of St Mary More images
Church of St Edmund	Egleton	Church	Norman	14 June 1954	SK8759407535; 52°39′31″N 0°42′23″W	1073761	Church of St Edmund More images
Church of St Peter	Empingham	Church	C13-C15	14 June 1954	SK9506408471; 52°39′56″N 0°35′45″W	1073940	Church of St Peter More images
Church of Saint Peter and Saint Paul	Exton Park, Exton	Parish Church	Medieval	14 June 1954	SK9205211192; 52°41′26″N 0°38′22″W	1177714	Church of Saint Peter and Saint Paul More images
Church of St Peter and St Paul	Great Casterton	Church	13th century	6 June 1961	TF0013408796; 52°40′03″N 0°31′15″W	1073841	Church of St Peter and St Paul More images
Church of St Mary	Greetham	Church	Norman	14 June 1954	SK9245814651; 52°43′18″N 0°37′57″W	1073218	Church of St Mary More images
Church of St Mary	Ketton	Church	12th century	6 June 1961	SK9818704298; 52°37′39″N 0°33′03″W	1073856	Church of St Mary More images
Church of St Peter and St Paul	Langham	Parish Church	Medieval	14 June 1954	SK8436711205; 52°41′31″N 0°45′11″W	1073732	Church of St Peter and St Paul More images
Church of St Andrew	Lyddington	Parish Church	Early/Mid 14th century	10 November 1955	SP8761296992; 52°33′49″N 0°42′32″W	1236656	Church of St Andrew More images
The Bede House	Lyddington	Bishop's Palace	Late C12/C13	10 November 1955	SP8758797005; 52°33′50″N 0°42′34″W	1264528	The Bede House More images
Watch Tower	Lyddington	Gazebo	Late 15th century	10 November 1955	SP8754696952; 52°33′48″N 0°42′36″W	1236617	Watch Tower More images
Church of St Peter and St Paul	Market Overton	Parish church	Anglo-Saxon	14 June 1954	SK8858916453; 52°44′18″N 0°41′22″W	1073229	Church of St Peter and St Paul More images
Church of St Mary	Morcott	Parish Church	C12-C13	10 November 1955	SK9246300786; 52°35′49″N 0°38′11″W	1288037	Church of St Mary More images
Church of St John the Baptist	North Luffenham	Church	C12-C15	10 November 1955	SK9344003255; 52°37′09″N 0°37′16″W	1073898	Church of St John the Baptist More images
North Luffenham Hall	North Luffenham	Manor House	Early C20	10 November 1955	SK9352103231; 52°37′08″N 0°37′12″W	1073899	North Luffenham Hall More images
Church of All Saints	Oakham	Parish Church	Early 13th century	8 May 1950	SK8606608905; 52°40′16″N 0°43′43″W	1073305	Church of All Saints More images
Oakham Castle	Oakham	Castle	1180-90	8 May 1950	SK8614708895; 52°40′15″N 0°43′39″W	1073277	Oakham Castle More images
Gateway to Oakham Castle	Oakham	Gateway		24 November 1971	SK8615308850; 52°40′14″N 0°43′39″W	1361781	Gateway to Oakham Castle More images
Market Cross	Oakham	Market Cross	17th century	8 May 1950	SK8609908829; 52°40′13″N 0°43′41″W	1073278	Market Cross More images
Stocks	Oakham	Stocks		8 May 1950	SK8610508827; 52°40′13″N 0°43′41″W	1073279	Stocks More images
Church of St John	Ryhall	Church	c. 1200	6 June 1961	TF0362410820; 52°41′07″N 0°28′07″W	1320352	Church of St John More images
Church of St Andrew	Stoke Dry	Parish Church	Early 12th century	10 November 1955	SP8555296768; 52°33′43″N 0°44′22″W	1237061	Church of St Andrew More images
Church of St Peter	Tickencote	Church	12th century	14 June 1954	SK9904409492; 52°40′27″N 0°32′12″W	1115498	Church of St Peter More images
Elizabethan School Room, Uppingham School	Uppingham	School	1584	10 November 1955	SP8670099591; 52°35′14″N 0°43′18″W	1073171	Elizabethan School Room, Uppingham School More images
Church of St Andrew	Whissendine	Church	C13-C15	14 June 1954	SK8331214309; 52°43′12″N 0°46′05″W	1295308	Church of St Andrew More images
