= James Bradshaw =

James or Jim Bradshaw may refer to:

- James Bradshaw (clergyman), English clergyman and ejected minister
- James Bradshaw (actor) (born 1976), British actor
- James Bradshaw (American football), American college football coach, head coach at Fresno State (1936–1942, 1946)
- James Bradshaw (cricketer, born 1902) (1902–1984), English cricketer, played for Leicestershire 1923–33
- James Bradshaw (cricketer, born 1906) (1906–1938), English cricketer, played for Leicestershire 1935–38
- James Bradshaw (Jacobite) (1717–1746), English Jacobite rebel
- James Bradshaw (minister) (1636–1702), English clergyman and ejected minister
- James Bradshaw (MP, born 1793) (1793–1847), Member of Parliament for Berwick-upon-Tweed, 1835–1837, and Canterbury, 1837–1847
- James Bradshaw (MP for Brackley) (1786–1833), Member of Parliament for Brackley, 1825–1832
- James Benn Bradshaw (1831–1886), New Zealand politician
- James Bradshaw (Jamaican politician), speaker of the House of Assembly of Jamaica in 1694
- Jim Bradshaw (born 1939), American football player
- James Bradshaw of The British Family, family avoiding imported goods in 2013

== See also ==
- Albert James Bradshaw (1882–1956), Canadian politician, businessman and farmer
