= Walter Bradshaw (Leicestershire cricketer) =

English cricketer

Personal information
- Full name: Walter Harry Bradshaw
- Born: 2 August 1906; Teddington, Middlesex, England
- Died: 30 October 1989 (aged 83); Leicester, Leicestershire, England
- Batting: Right-handed
- Relatives: James Bradshaw (brother); James Bradshaw (cousin)

Domestic team information
- Years: Team
- 1929: Leicestershire

Career statistics
Competition	First-class
Matches	3
Runs scored	38
Batting average	7.60
100s/50s	0/0
Top score	20
Catches/stumpings	0/–
- Source: Cricinfo, 22 July 2011

Walter Harry Bradshaw (2 August 1906 – 30 October 1989) was an English cricketer. Bradshaw was a right-handed batsman. He was born in Teddington, Middlesex.

Bradshaw made his first-class debut for Leicestershire against Gloucestershire in the 1929 County Championship. He made 2 further first-class appearances, both coming in 1929, against Gloucestershire and Lancashire. With the bat, he scored 38 runs at an average of 7.60, with a high score of 20.

His brother, James, and cousin, also called James, both played first-class cricket for Leicestershire. He died in Leicester, Leicestershire on 30 October 1989.
