= James Bradshaw (cricketer, born 1906) =

English cricketer

Personal information
- Full name: James William Montgomery Bradshaw
- Born: 23 November 1906; Oakham, Rutland, England
- Died: 5 December 1938 (aged 32); Oakham, Rutland, England
- Batting: Left-handed
- Bowling: Right-arm
- Relatives: James Bradshaw (cousin); Walter Bradshaw (cousin)

Domestic team information
- Years: Team
- 1935–1938: Leicestershire

Career statistics
Competition	First-class
Matches	3
Runs scored	95
Batting average	31.66
100s/50s	0/1
Top score	82
Balls bowled	192
Wickets	1
Bowling average	103.00
5 wickets in innings	0
10 wickets in match	0
Best bowling	1/25
Catches/stumpings	3/–
- Source: Cricinfo, 30 July 2011

James William Montgomery Bradshaw (23 November 1906 – 5 December 1938) was an English cricketer. Bradshaw was a left-handed batsman who was a right-arm bowler, although his bowling style is unknown. He was born in Oakham, Rutland.

He made his first-class debut for Leicestershire against Sir J Cahn's XI in 1935. He made 2 further first-class appearances, against Sir L Parkinson's XI in 1935 and Oxford University in 1938. In his 3 matches, he scored 95 runs at an average of 31.66, with a high score of 82. This score came in his debut match against Sir J Cahn's XI. He also took a single wicket, that of Oxford University batsman John Guy.

His cousins, James Bradshaw and Walter Bradshaw, both played first-class cricket for Leicestershire. Bradshaw died in the town of his birth on 5 December 1938.
