= North Luffenham Hall =

Grade I listed house in Rutland, England

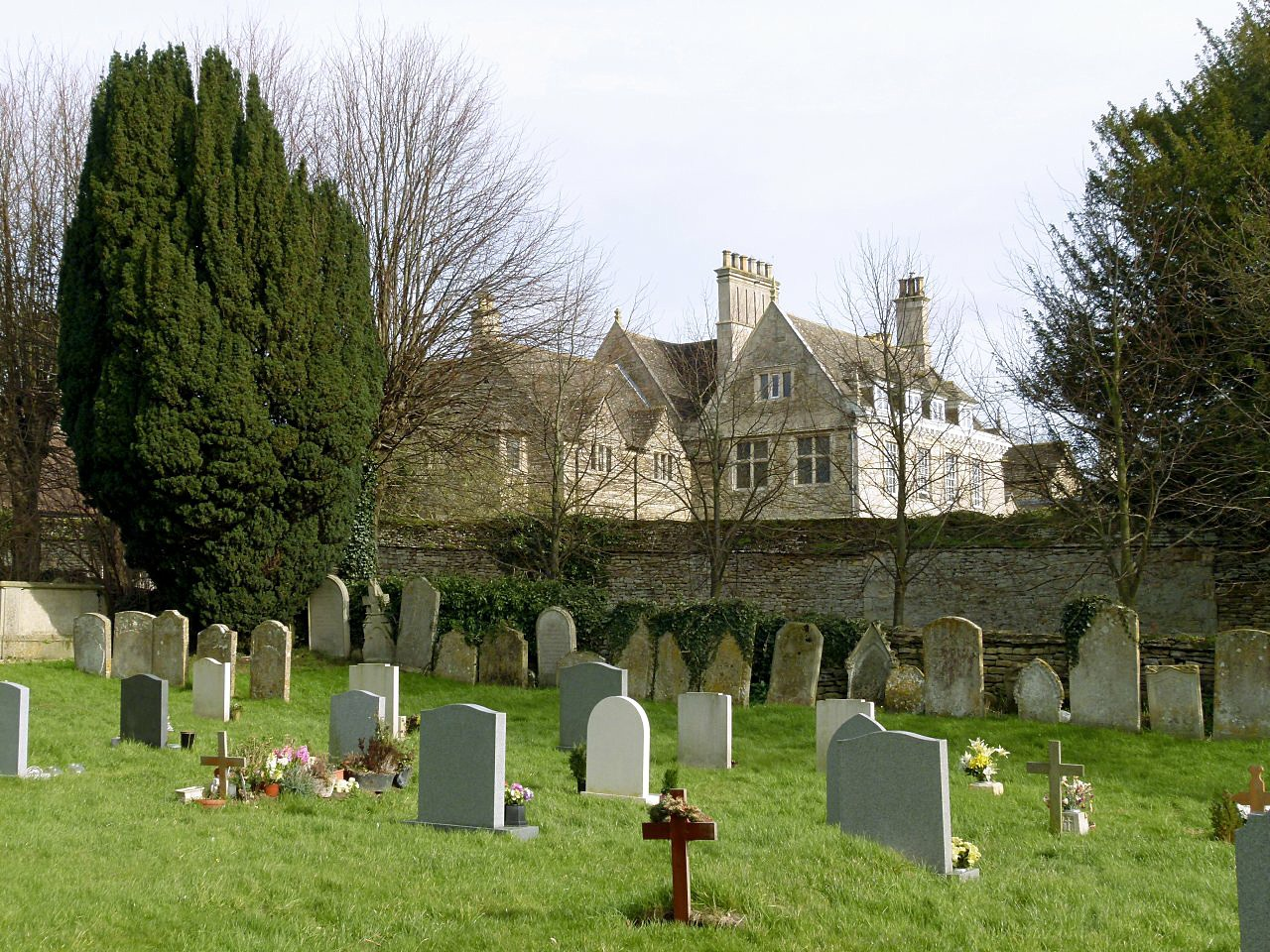
- The hall from the churchyard of St John the Baptist Church

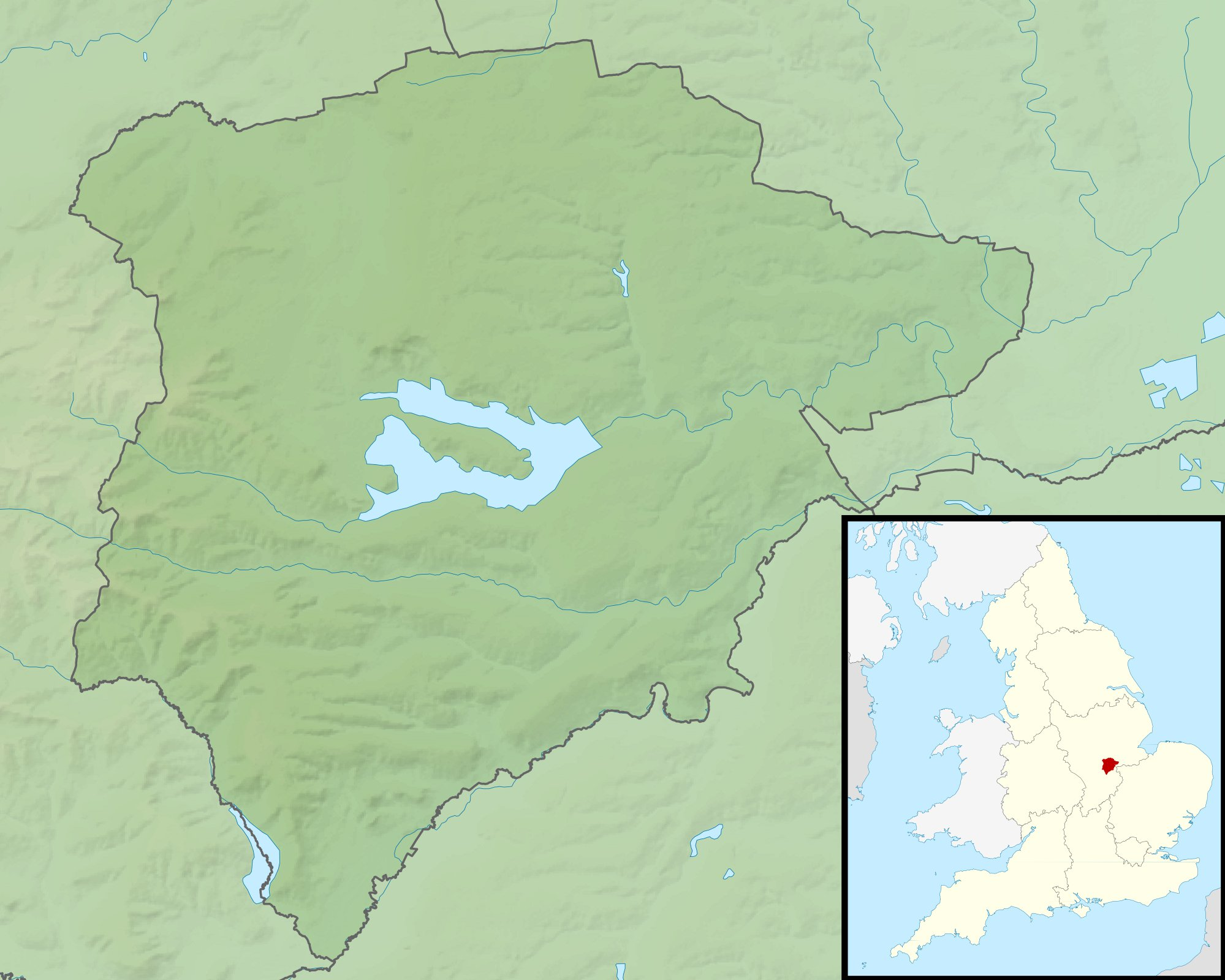
- Location within Rutland
- 52.6188°N 0.62°W
- Type: House
- Location: North Luffenham, Rutland

History
- Built: 16th - 18th centuries with 20th-century additions

Site notes
- Architect: Sidney Gambier-Parry for the 20th-century additions
- Owner: Private

Listed Building – Grade I
- Official name: North Luffenham (or Luffenham) Hall
- Designated: 10 November 1955
- Reference no.: 1073899

Listed Building – Grade II*
- Official name: Barn at Luffenham Hall
- Designated: 10 November 1955
- Reference no.: 1073900

Listed Building – Grade II
- Official name: Stables at Luffenham Hall
- Designated: 10 November 1955
- Reference no.: 1361450

Listed Building – Grade II
- Official name: Gazebo, Gate Piers and Wall at Luffenham Hall
- Designated: 10 November 1955
- Reference no.: 1177916

Listed Building – Grade II
- Official name: Garden Room, Gateway and Walls and Gate Piers at Luffenham Hall
- Designated: 10 November 1955
- Reference no.: 1307221

North Luffenham Hall, (sometimes Luffenham Hall), North Luffenham, Rutland, England stands on the southern edge of the village, adjacent to the Church of St John the Baptist. Originally the manor house, and then known as Luffenham Hall when the original hall was demolished in 1806, it has also been known as Digby Hall, after a family which owned it. The oldest parts of the present structure date from the mid-16th century. The hall was enlarged in the 18th century, and again in the early 20th century. North Luffenham Hall is a Grade I listed building. Other buildings within the complex have their own listings.

== History and description ==
The oldest part of the North Luffenham Hall complex is a barn which stands just to the north-east of the hall. This carries a datestone of 1555. Elizabeth Williamson, in her Leicestershire and Rutland volume in the Buildings of England series, revised and reissued in 2003, suggests that the north front of the hall shows evidence of 16th- and 17th-century work, while the south frontage is more confused, being "obscured" by a classical façade added in the early 18th century, and by a service wing added in the early 20th century. The hall served originally as the manor house to the manor of North Luffenham and was owned by the Harrington family. In the later 16th century it was bought by the Digby family. (Note: Sources differ as to the date and purchaser. Country Life suggests the hall was bought by a Simon Digby in 1559, while the Rutland volume of the Victoria County History ascribes the purchase to James Digby in 1599.) In the early 20th century the owner was an E. Guy Fenwick who engaged Sidney Gambier-Parry to construct the service wing.

The hall is built to a double-pile plan. The roof line is enlivened by multiple gables, dormers and chimney stacks. The build material is rubble stone, embellished with ashlar. The interior retains some 17th-century fittings, including extensive wood panelling. Marcus Binney, the architectural historian, describes North Luffenham as "grandeur in miniature", noting the pleasing symmetry of the facades and the sympathetic, and costly, restoration undertaken by the building's 21st-century owners. North Luffenham Hall is a Grade I listed building. The barn is listed at Grade II*, while the stables, and two sets of gates and walls, together with a gazebo and a garden room, are listed at Grade II.

== Gallery ==
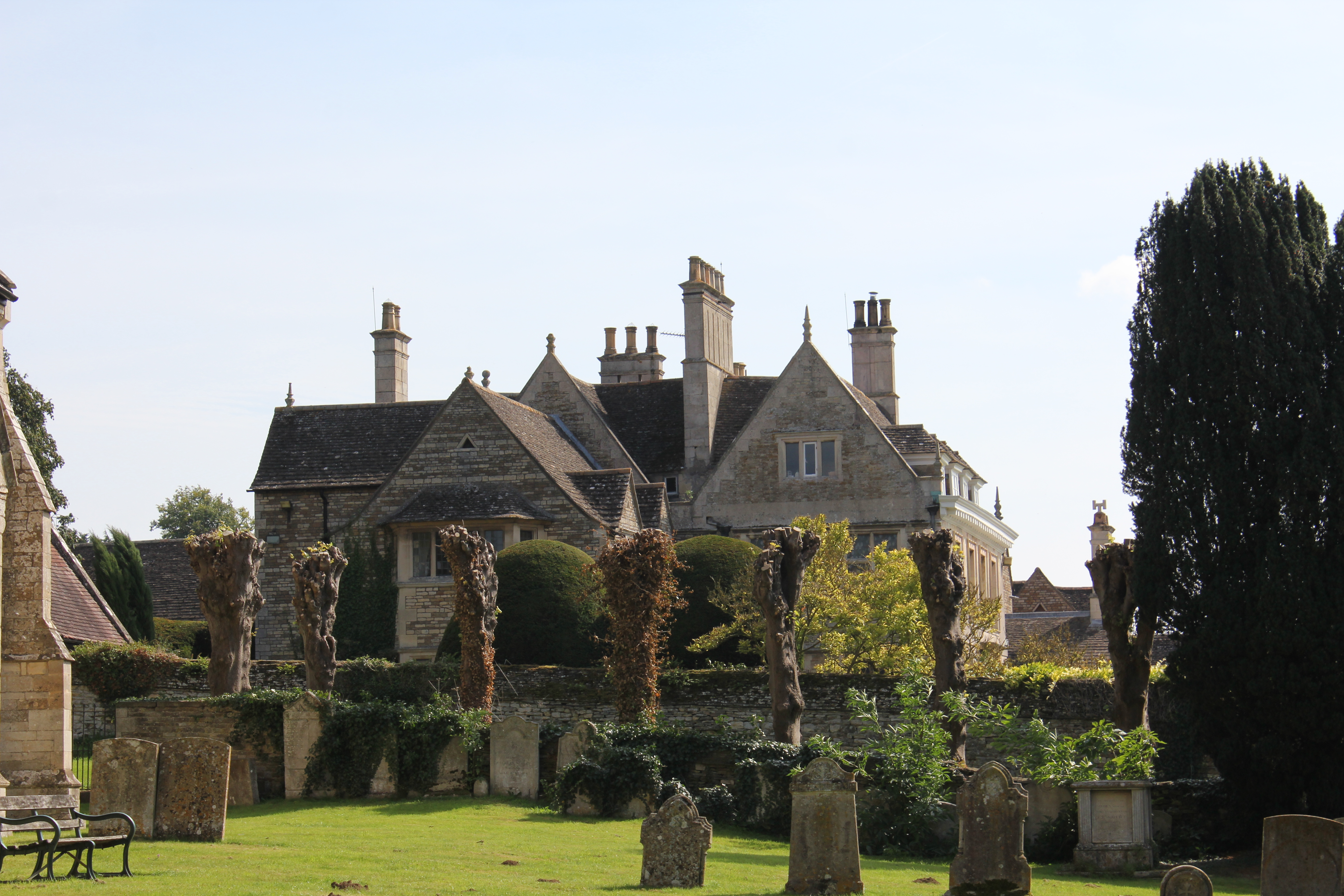
A view of the hall showing, to the right, the neoclassical south façade

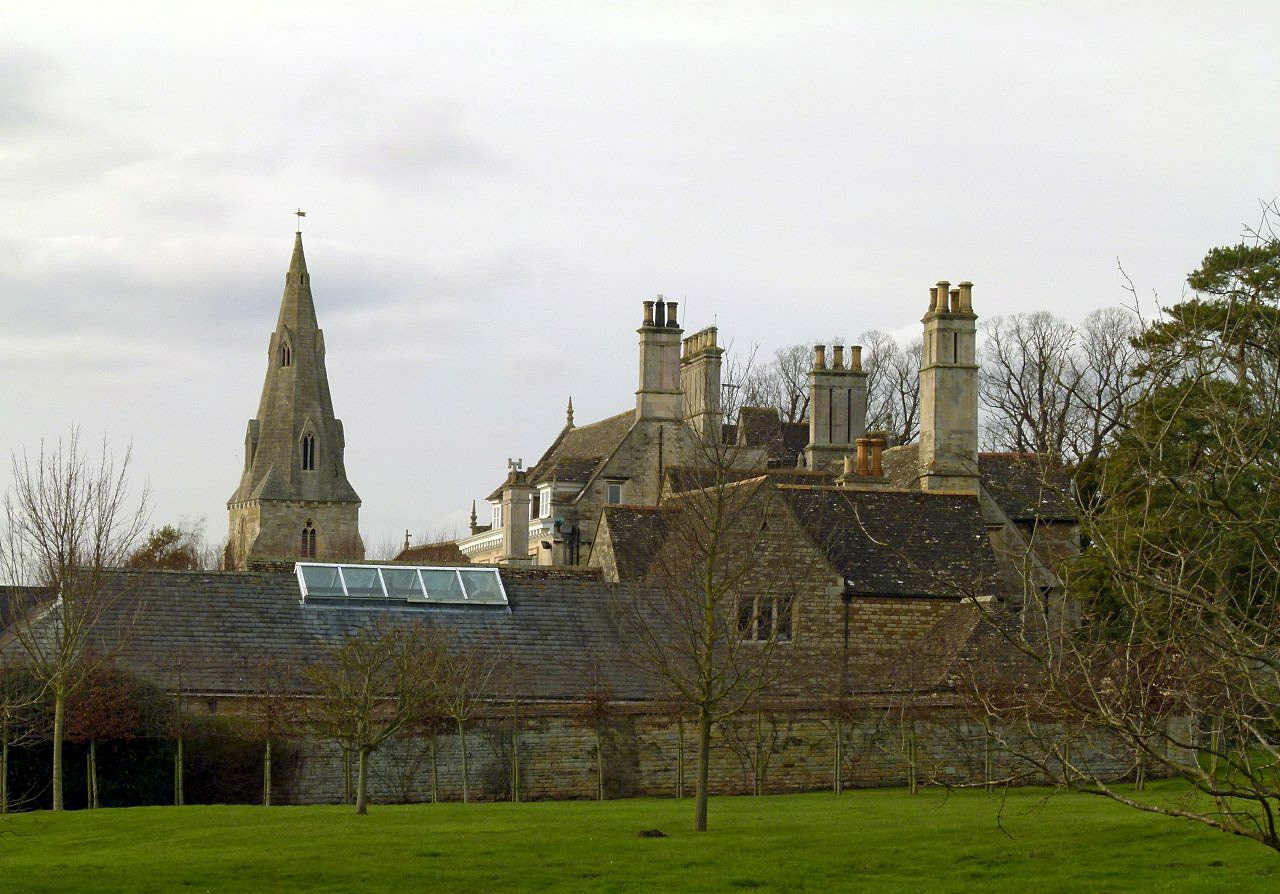
The hall and church from the east

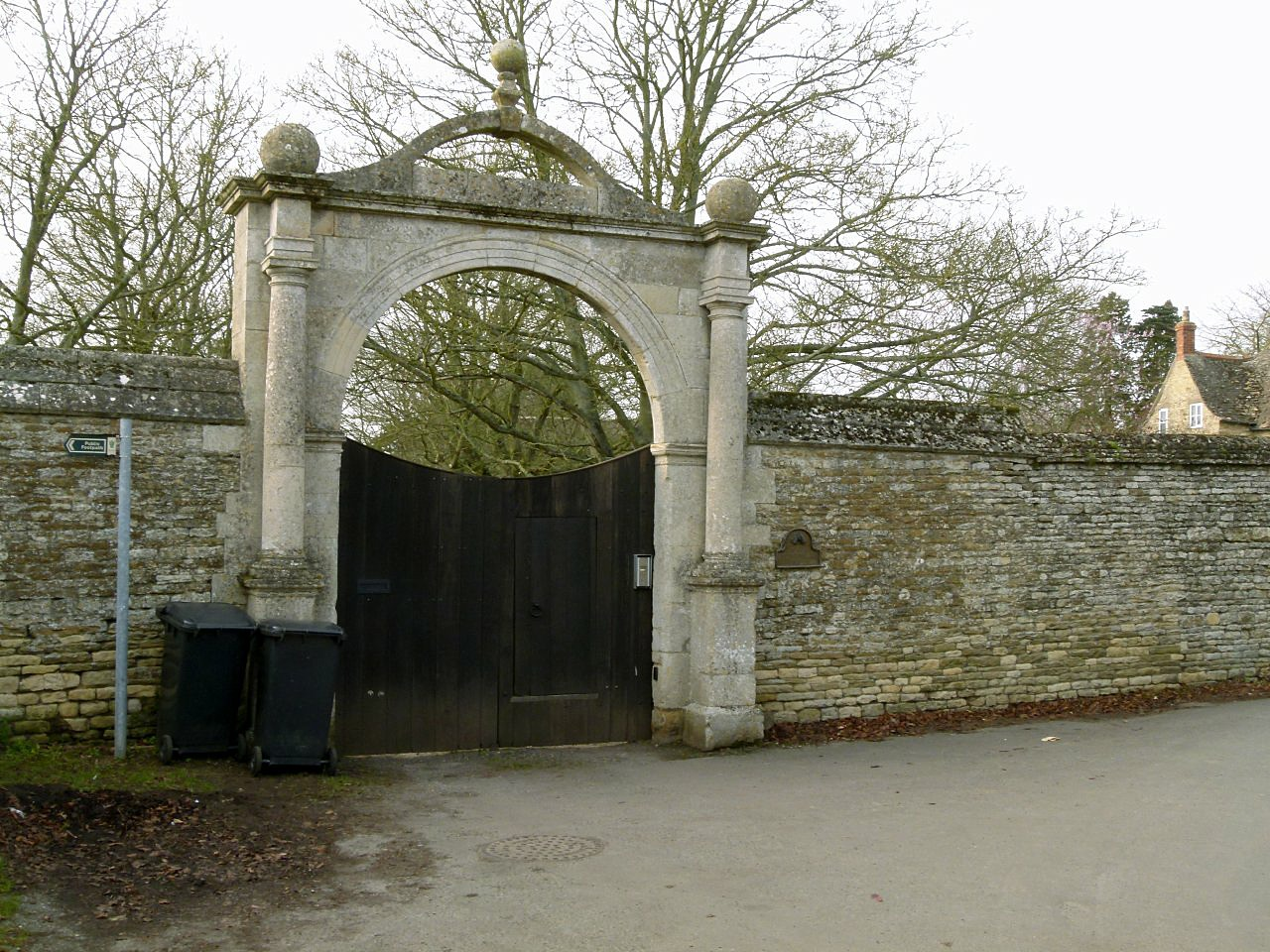
The Grade II listed gateway

== Sources ==
- Binney, Marcus (2007). In Search of the Perfect House: 500 of the Best Buildings in Britain and Ireland. London, UK: Weidenfeld & Nicolson. ISBN 9-780297-84455-6.
- Page, William (1935). A History of the County of Rutland. Victoria County History. Vol. 2. London: Victoria County History.
- Pevsner, Nikolaus; Williamson, Elizabeth (2003). Leicestershire and Rutland. The Buildings of England. New Haven, US and London: Yale University Press. ISBN 978-0-300-09618-7. OCLC 49298894.
