= John Furley (cricketer) =

English cricketer

Personal information
- Full name: John Furley
- Born: 24 March 1847; Oakham, Rutland, England
- Died: 30 June 1909 (aged 62); Oakham, Rutland, England
- Batting: Right-handed
- Bowling: Right-arm roundarm fast

Career statistics
Competition	First-class
Matches	2
Runs scored	13
Batting average	3.25
100s/50s	–/–
Top score	5
Catches/stumpings	–/–
- Source: Cricinfo, 8 September 2019

John Furley (24 March 1847 – 30 June 1909) was an English first-class cricketer.

Furley was born at Oakham in March 1847, where he was educated at Oakham School. He made two appearances in first-class cricket. His first appearance came for the North in the North v South fixture of 1875 at Loughborough, with his second appearance coming for an England XI against Gloucestershire at The Oval in 1877. He captained Oakham and Burghley Park Cricket Club.

Furley was a wine and spirit merchant on High Street, Oakham. He died suddenly at Oakham in June 1909.
