= Church of St Peter and St Paul, Market Overton =

Church in Market Overton, Rutland

Coordinates: 52.7385°N 0.6893°W

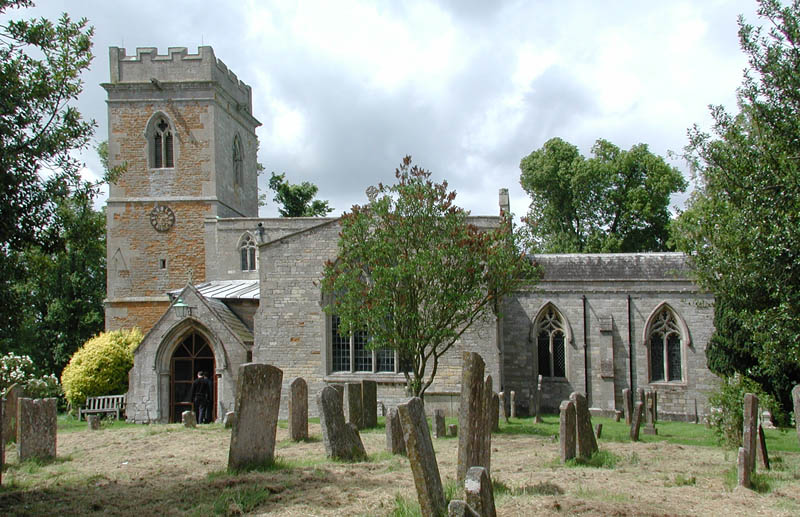
- Denomination: Church of England

History
- Dedication: St Peter, St Paul

Administration
- Diocese: Peterborough
- Parish: Market Overton, Rutland

Clergy
- Vicar(s): Stephen Griffiths

The Church of St Peter and St Paul is the Church of England parish church in Market Overton, Rutland. The church is part of the Oakham team ministry. It is a Grade I listed building.

== History ==
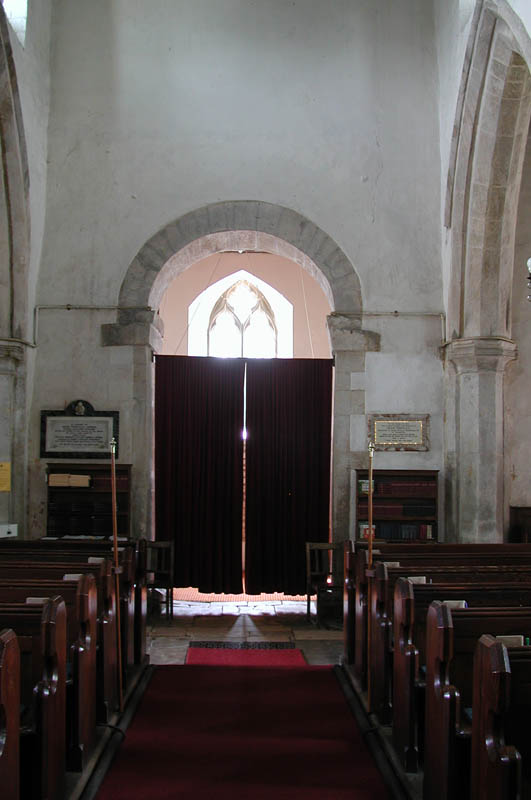
The Anglo-Saxon tower arch

The church primarily dates from the late 13th and early 14th century though it does have a tower arch dating from the Anglo-Saxon era, the "only worthwhile piece of Anglo-Saxon architecture in the County".

The tower was added in the 13th century but the top section was added the following century and it was also raised.

There is an Early English column capital inverted to make a base for the Norman bowl, on the font.

A coffin the size of an infant is on the north side of the tower arch and was probably made for an Anglo-Saxon family. On the east wall of the chancel, is a monument to Henry Tymperon. There is also a monument to Thomas Cox, a former rector.

The sundial on the south face of the tower is said to have been donated by Sir Isaac Newton. His mother, Harriet Ayscough, lived in the village.
