= Stocks =

Restraining device

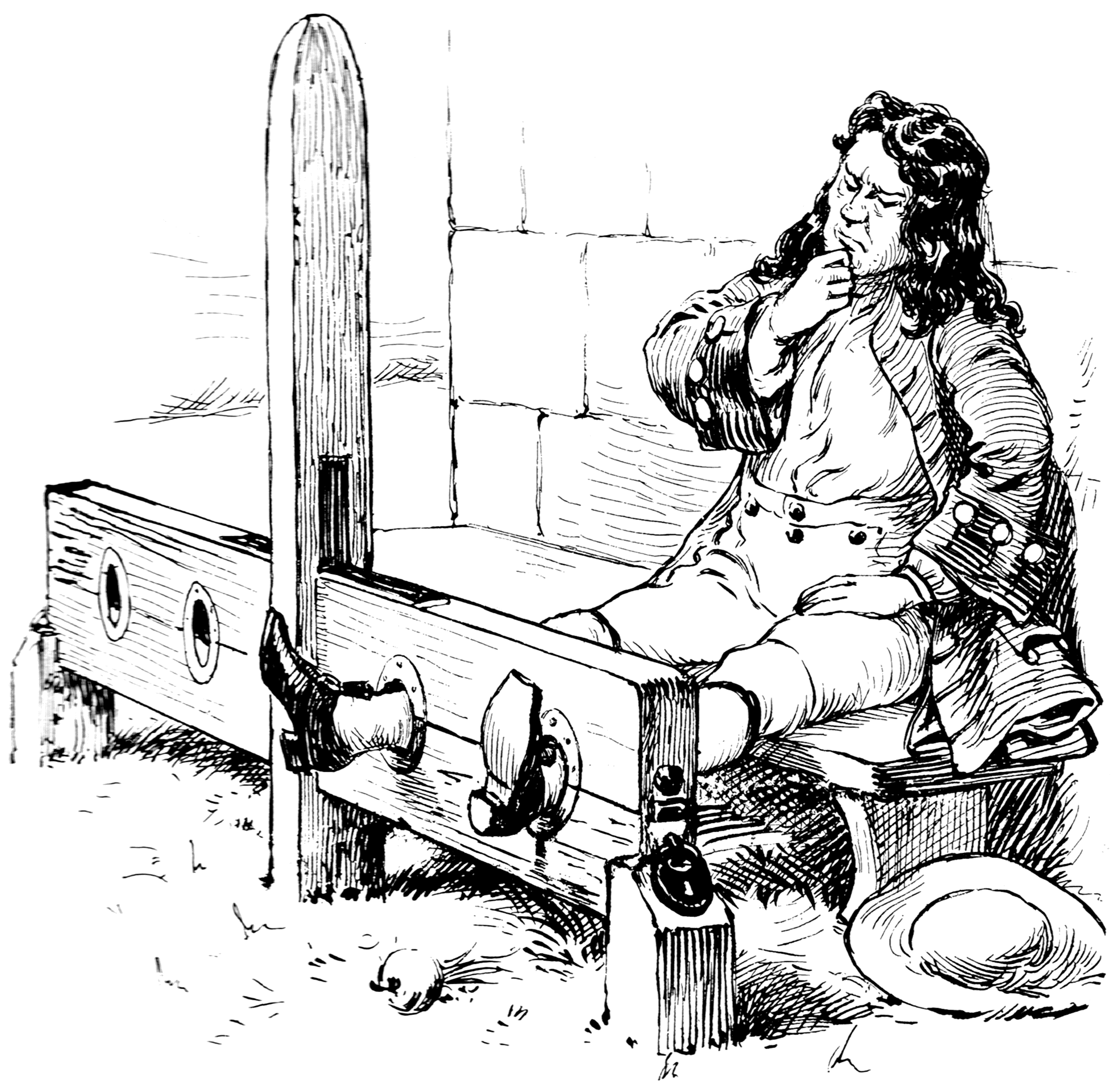
Stocks, unlike the pillory or pranger, restrain only the feet.

Stocks are a feet restraining device that were used as a form of corporal punishment and public humiliation. The use of stocks is seen as early as Classical Athens, where they are described as being in use in Solon's law code. The law describing its use is cited by the orator Lysias: "'He shall have his or her foot confined in the stocks for five days, if the court shall make such addition to the sentence.' The 'stocks' there mentioned, Theomnestus, are what we now call 'confinement in the wood'" (Lys. 10.16).

== Form and applications ==
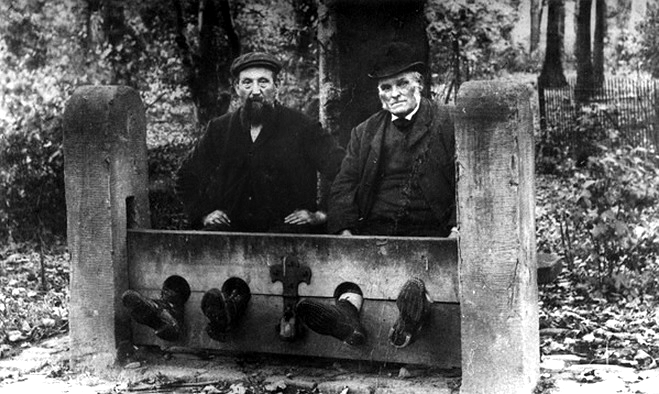
Village stocks in Bramhall, England.

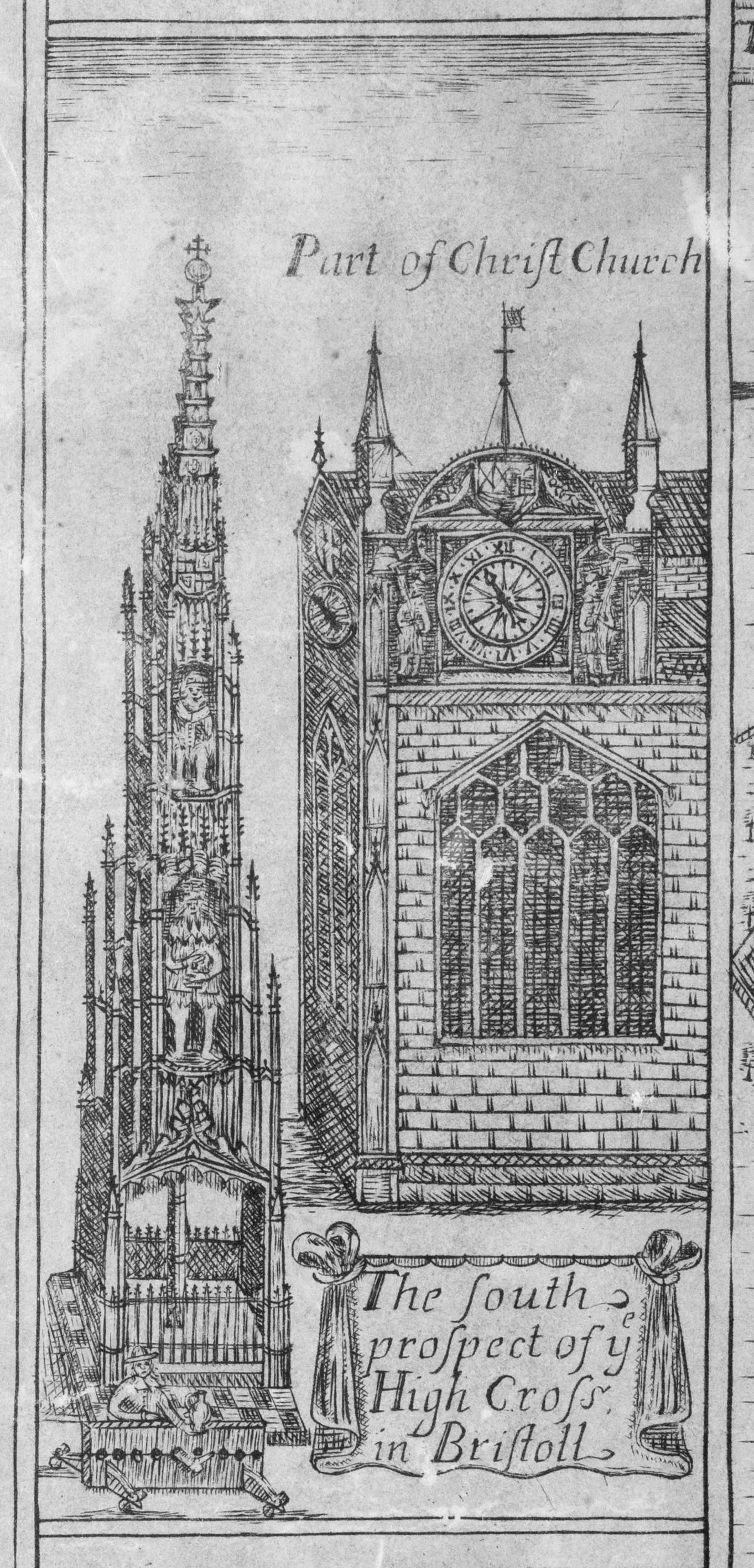
The south prospect of the High Cross in Bristol (1728)

The stocks and the pillory each consist of large wooden boards with hinges; however, the stocks are distinguished by their restraint of the feet. The stocks consist of placing boards around the ankles, and sometimes also the wrists, with the punished held in a seated position, whereas the pillory has boards fixed to a pole and placed around the arms and neck, forcing the punished to stand.

Victims may be insulted, kicked, tickled, spat on, or subjected to other inhumane acts. In the Bible, the treatment of Paul and Silas, disciples of Jesus, was detailed in the Acts of the Apostles: "Having received such a charge, he put them into the inner prison and fastened their feet in the stocks." The Old Testament's book of Job also describes the stocks, referring to God:

He puts my feet in the stocks, he watches all my paths.

The stocks were employed by civil and military authorities from medieval to early modern times including Colonial America. Public punishment in the stocks was a common occurrence from around 1500 until at least 1748. The stocks were especially popular among the early American Puritans, who frequently employed the stocks for punishing the "lower class".

In the American colonies, the stocks were also used, not only for punishment, but as a means of restraining individuals awaiting trial.

The offender would be exposed to whatever treatment those who passed by could imagine. This could include tickling of the feet. As noted by The New York Times in an article dated November 13, 1887, "Gone, too, are the parish stocks, in which offenders against public morality formerly sat imprisoned, with their legs held fast beneath a heavy wooden yoke, while sundry small but fiendish boys improved the occasion by deliberately pulling off their shoes and then tickling the soles of their defenseless feet."

England's Statute of Labourers 1351 (25 Edw. 3. Stat. 2) prescribed the use of the stocks for "unruly artisans" and required that every town and village erect a set of stocks. In towns and cities they were commonly placed in prominent central locations, such as the one before Bristol's High Cross. The 1351 act was repealed in England and Wales by the Statute Law Revision Act 1863. Sources indicate that the stocks were used in England for over 500 years and have never been formally abolished.

Their last recorded use in the United Kingdom was on 11 June 1872 at Newbury, Berkshire, England.

In Toronto, Ontario, Canada, court records from 1811 required the building of a set of stocks for punishment.

The Spanish conquistadores introduced stocks as a popular form of punishment and humiliation against those who impeded the consolidation of their settlements in the New World. They were still used in the 19th century in Latin America to punish indigenous miners in many countries for rebelling against their bosses.

== Modern use ==
=== Colombia ===
In Colombia in 2012, married thirty-four-year-old Alfreda Blanco Basilio and her eighteen-year-old lover Luis Martinez were placed in stocks by the Sampues tribe in Colombia due to Basilio's adultery. Basilio spent 72 hours barefoot in the stocks for her offense.

In 2020, during the COVID-19 pandemic, police in Chinu, Colombia, placed residents who broke quarantine in stocks for a few hours.

=== United Kingdom ===
The Oxfordshire town of Thame made international headlines in 2016 when it put forward a proposal to build stocks in the town. Introduced by Councillor David Bretherton, the idea was that the stocks would be used for hire and for charitable events. As noted by Bretherton, "Perhaps for charity we could do something like that, get people in the stocks and have others donate money for the time they last while having their feet tickled and syrup poured between their toes for laughs." Bretherton noted that the stocks were still legal in England. It was not proposed that the stocks would be used for punishment purposes. After the announcement, further study of the topic was undertaken.

=== United States ===
In 1989, the Arkansas town of Dermott passed a curfew law punishable by up to thirty days in jail for the offender's parents, including up to two days in the stocks. The city almost immediately remitted the punishment because, among other things, the city did not have a set of stocks and had allocated no funds to build one.

== Examples ==
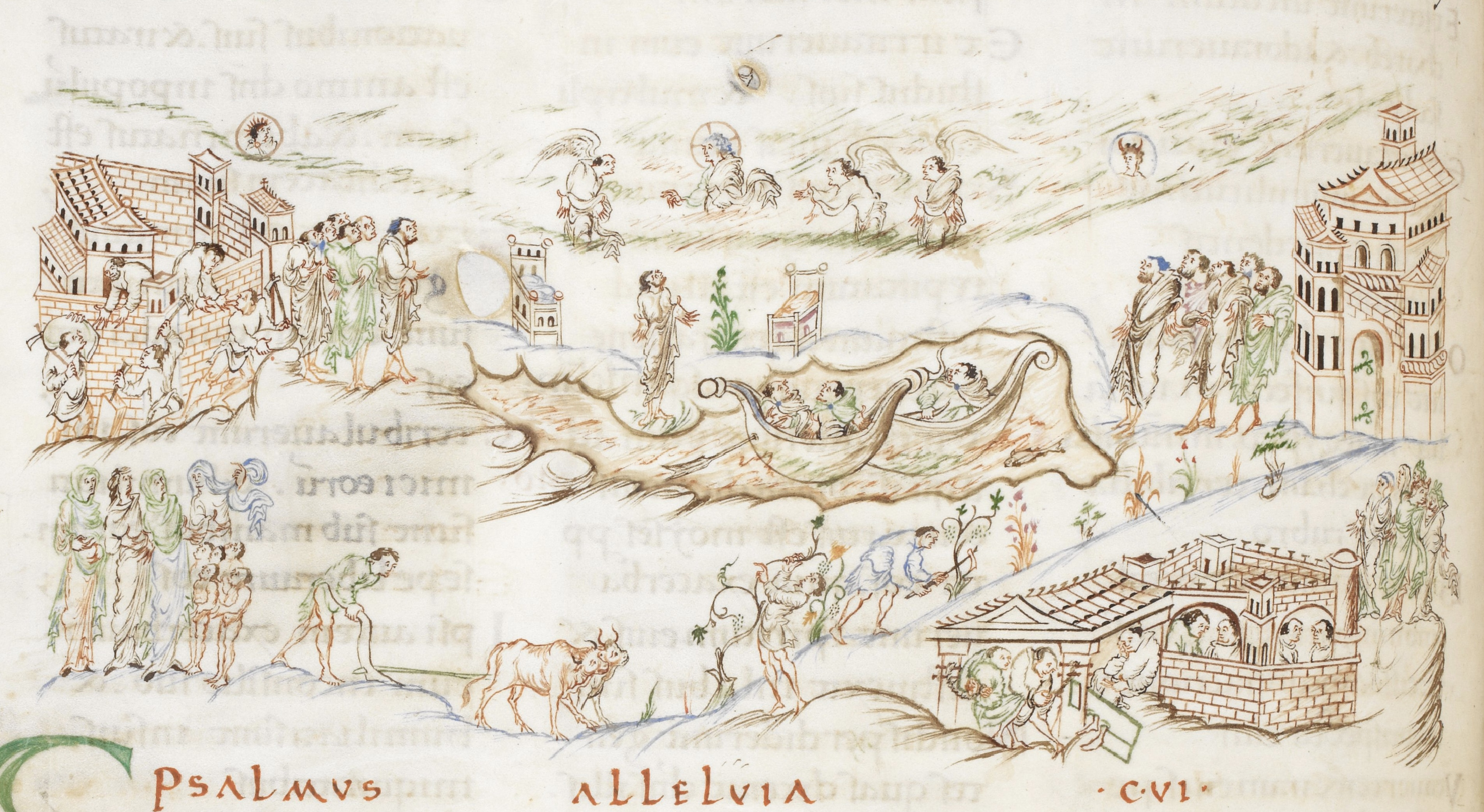
Illumination from the 11th-century Harley Psalter, showing (in the bottom right) a man in stocks next to two men in shackles

Stocks are occasionally preserved in churches or museums; as wooden devices they are naturally subject to rotting and decay. Some have been heavily restored in the 19th and 20th centuries. Most are protected as listed buildings.

=== England ===
- Broughton-in-Furness, Cumbria
- Thornton in Lonsdale, North Yorkshire, outside St Oswold's Church.
- Caverswall, Staffordshire
- Evesham, Worcestershire, on Merstow Green.
- Eyam, Derbyshire; 18th century, on the village green.
- Little Longstone, Derbyshire; stone stock-ends in a small walled recess on the village street, dating from the 17th century or earlier.
- Canewdon, Essex; inside the village lock-up, dated 1775.
- Aldbury, Hertfordshire; combined stocks and whipping post on the village green.
- Great Amwell, Hertfordshire; in the churchyard but originally sited behind a public house.
- North Turton, Lancashire; 18th or 19th century stocks in the High Street.
- Haveringland, Norfolk; 1804 or earlier.
- Oakham Market Cross and stocks, Oakham, Rutland.
- Alfold, Surrey; 18th century stocks and whipping post under a roof outside the church.
- Bilton, Warwickshire; last used in 1866, located on The Green since 1954.
- Ufton, Warwickshire; 18th century or earlier, by the churchyard wall.
- Poulton-Le-Fylde, Lancashire; 18th century, in the market square.
- Huntley, Gloucestershire; date unknown, relocated c. 1970 to the recreation ground from a site nearer the centre of the village.
- Roydon, Essex; the stocks are a Grade II listed structure, along with the adjacent village lock-up.
- Newton-le-Willows, Merseyside, outside St Peter's Church.
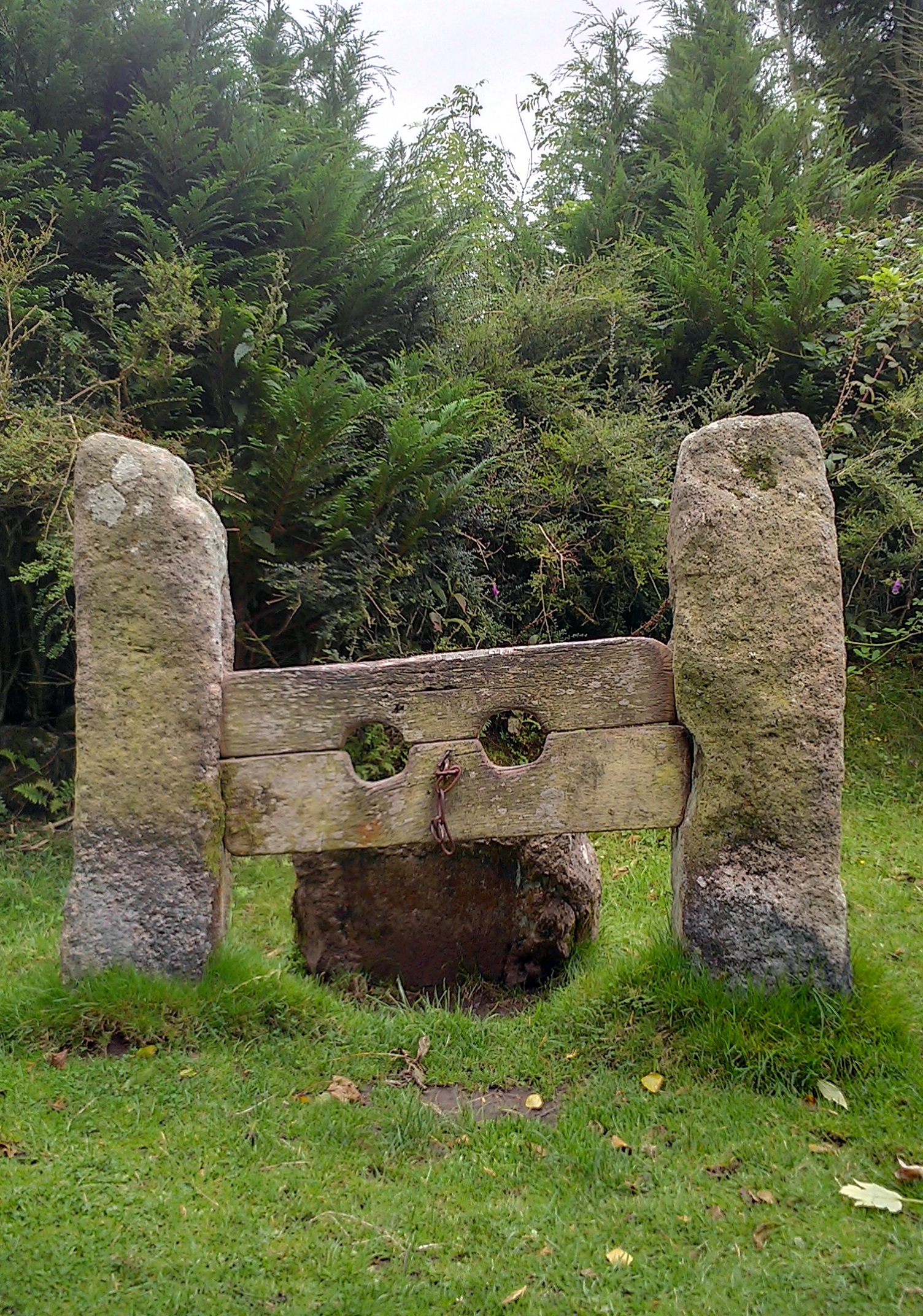
The Stocks at Belstone in Dartmoor, a Grade II listed monument.

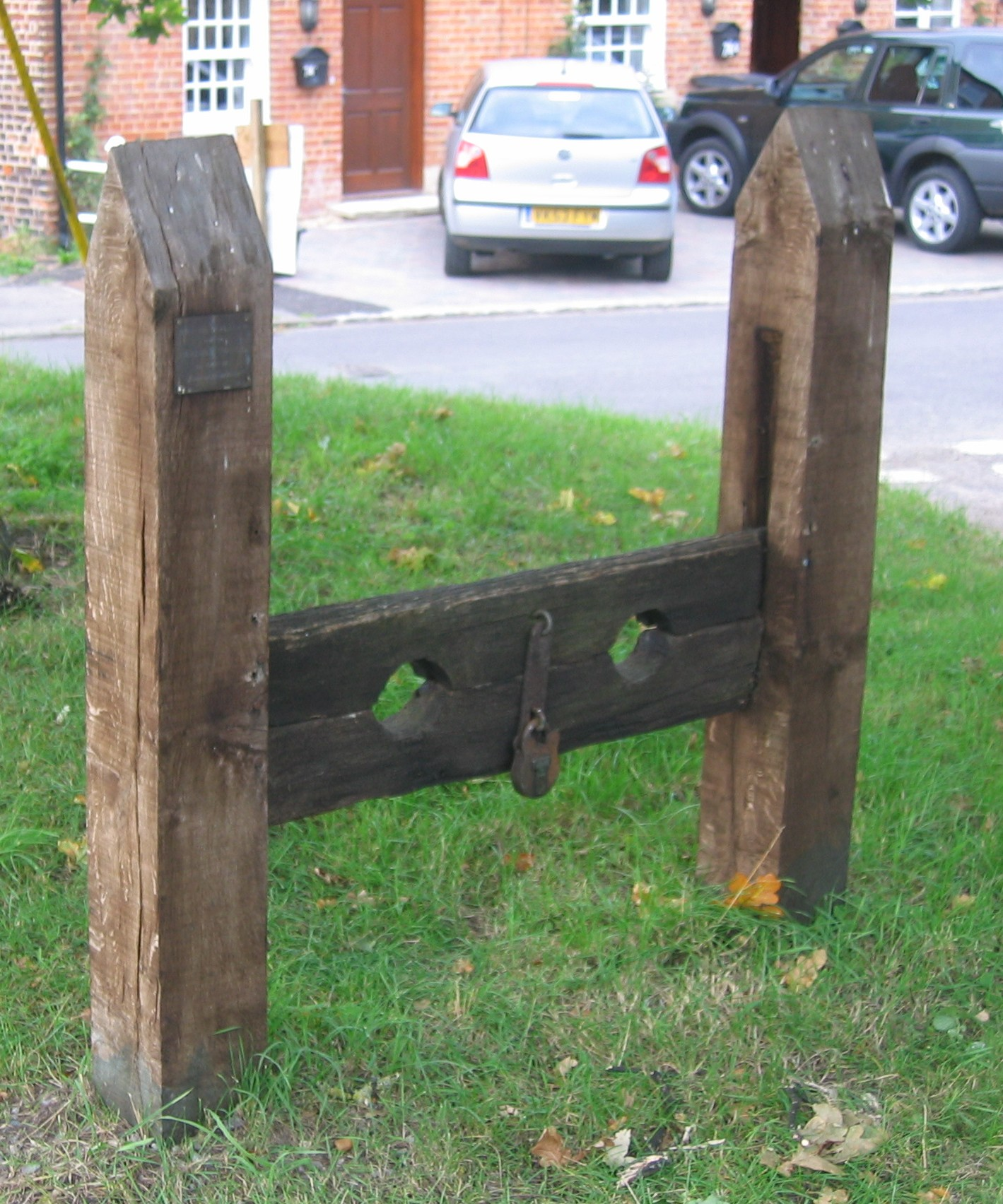
Stocks in Keevil, Wiltshire.

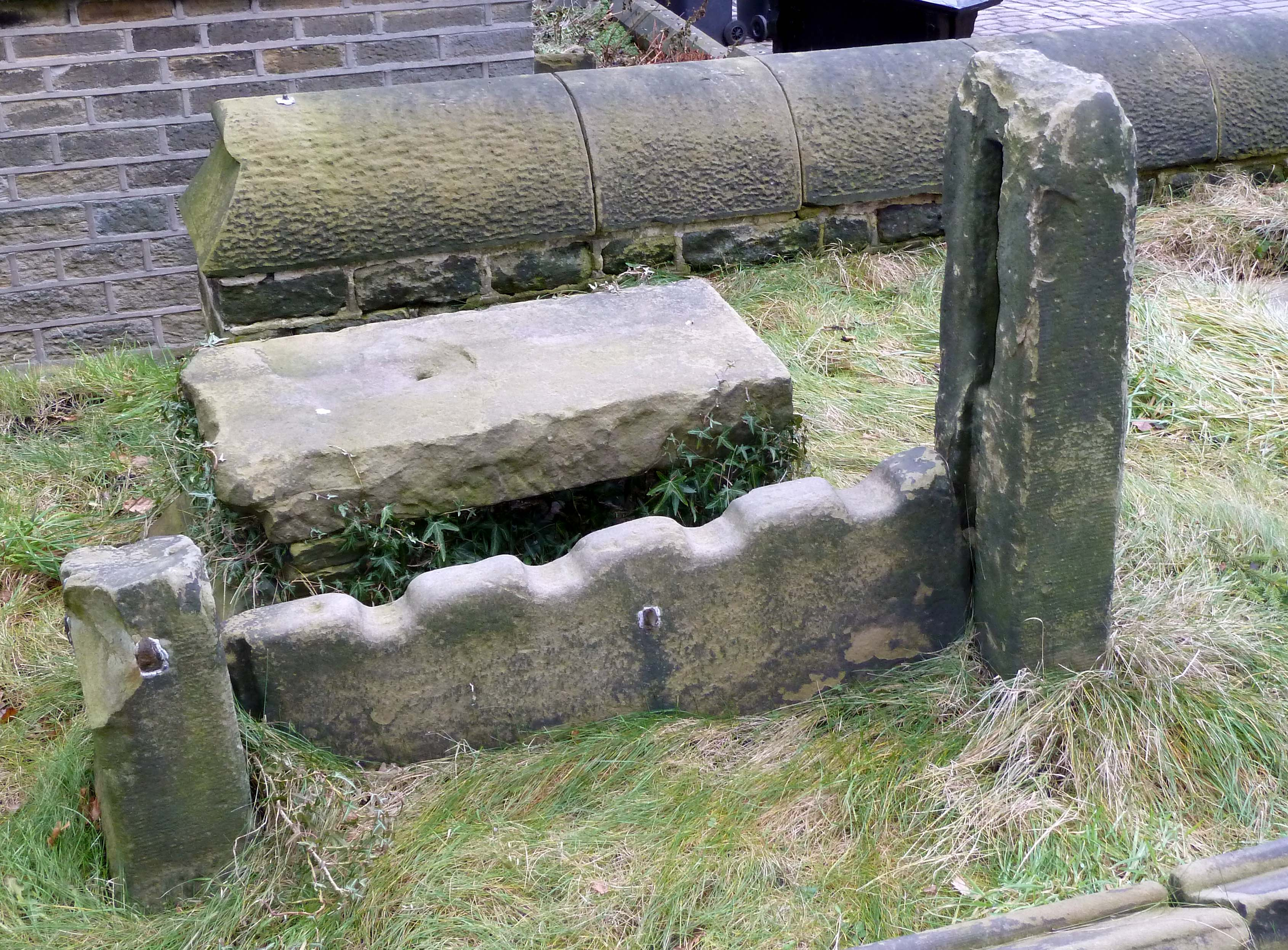
Stocks in the churchyard of St Mary's church, Honley, West Yorkshire.

=== Northern Ireland ===
- Dromore, County Down; in the Market Square.

== See also ==
- Bilboes – Form of leg restraint
- Shackling – Metal assembly which functions as a removable connecting link
- Shrew's fiddle – Early modern form of public punishment
- Stock – Strongly built livestock holding stall
- Wheel clamp – Device designed to prevent motor vehicles from being moved
