= Church of St Peter and St Paul, Great Casterton =

Church in Great Casterton, Rutland

Coordinates: 52°40′04″N 0°31′15″W

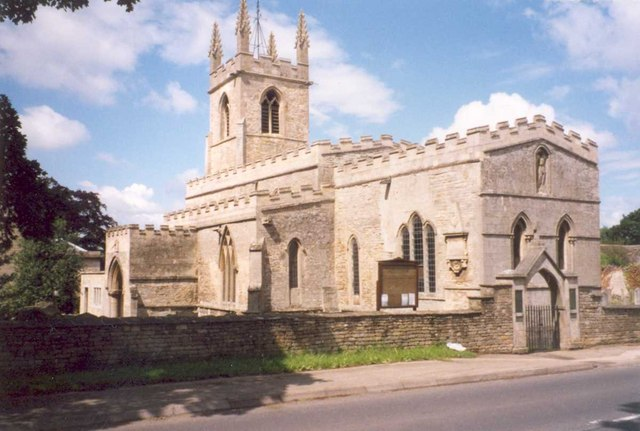
- Denomination: Church of England

History
- Dedication: St Peter, St Paul

Administration
- Diocese: Peterborough
- Parish: Great Casterton, Rutland

Clergy
- Vicar(s): Don McGarrigle

The Church of St Peter and St Paul is a church in Great Casterton, Rutland. It is a Grade I listed building. The benefice is shared with Pickworth, Tickencote and Little Casterton.

== History ==
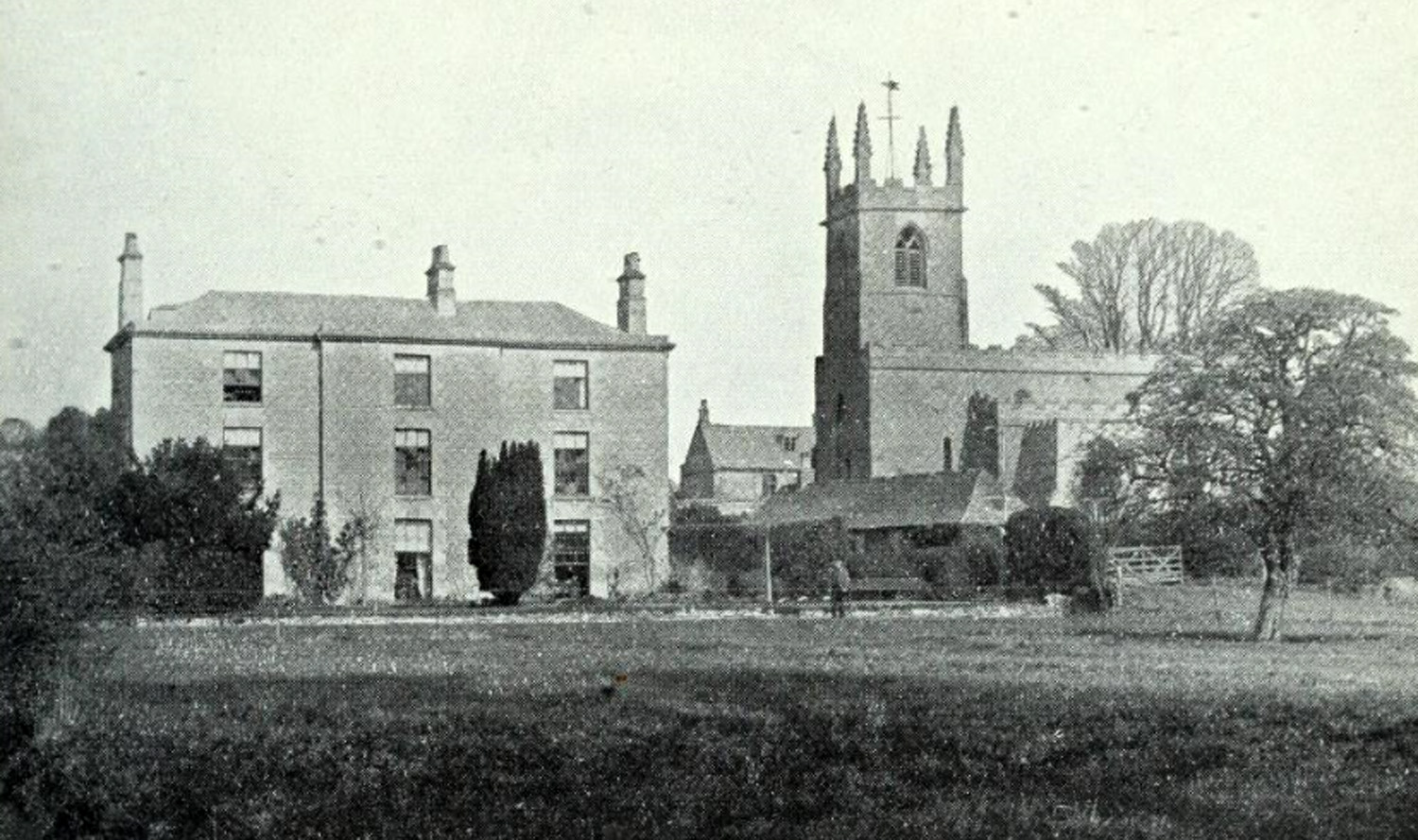
The Rectory and Parish Church in 1912

The church is Norman and originally had a nave and two aisles separated by arcades. The tower was connected to the nave by a horseshoe-shaped arch. At the east end of the nave was an arch leading into the chancel.

A chancel with lancet windows was extended in the 13th century replacing the older one. Windows were added to the aisles. Above the arcade a clerestory was built with Decorated windows in the 15th century. A wooden rood loft, with St Mary and St John on either side of Jesus Christ on the cross, was added across the chancel arch. The font dates from late 12th to early 13th century.

Box pews were added in the 18th century but have been removed. Restoration of the church took place in the 20th century.

The churchyard is entered through an arched war memorial remembering the dead of both World Wars.

The poet John Clare married Martha "Patty" Turner in the church in 1820.
