= James Bradshaw (clergyman) =

James Bradshaw (1613–1685) was an English clergyman and ejected minister.

James Bradshaw was born at Darcy Lever, near Bolton, Lancashire, the son of John Bradshaw and his wife Alice Lever. He was educated at Brasenose College, Oxford.

He was Presbyterian rector of Wigan, and in 1644 he encouraged the siege of Lathom House by sermons from Jeremiah Chapter 15, verse 14, in which he compared Lathom's seven towers to the seven heads of the beast. He was superseded at Wigan by Charles Hotham for not observing the parliamentary fast. He was called to Macclesfield, but was ejected in 1662 after the Act of Uniformity 1662. He preached at Houghton Chapel, and subsequently at Bradshaw Chapel, reading some of the prayers, but not subscribing.

He died in 1685, aged 73, and was buried at Bolton on 26 February. He was succeeded by his eldest son, John Bradshaw.
