= Church of St John the Evangelist, Ryhall =

Church in Ryhall, Rutland, England

Coordinates: 52°41′07″N 0°28′07″W

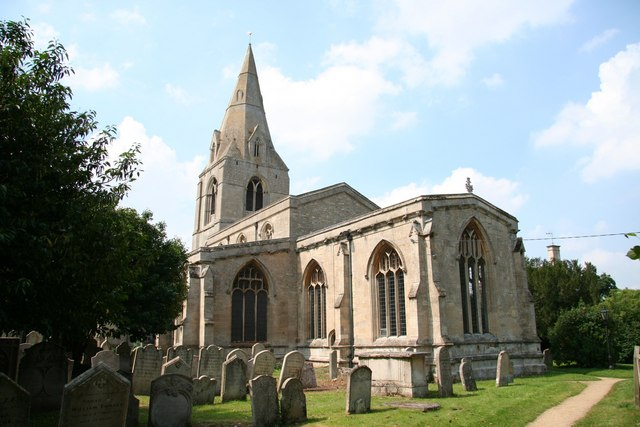
- Denomination: Church of England

History
- Dedication: St John the Evangelist

Administration
- Diocese: Peterborough
- Parish: Ryhall, Rutland

Clergy
- Vicar(s): Jo Saunders

The Church of St John the Evangelist is a church in Ryhall, Rutland. It is a Grade I listed building.

== History ==
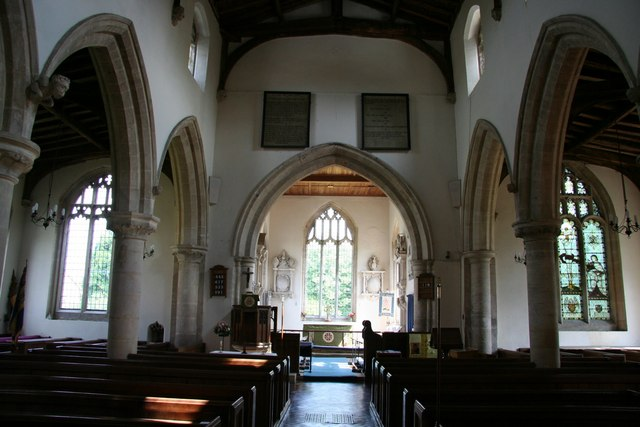
The nave

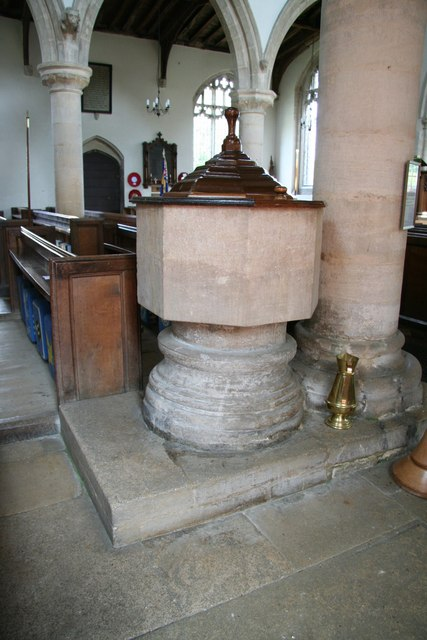
The font

The church dates from the early 13th century. Several carved figures are positioned around the outside of the church. The south porch has a parvis room, which would have been made for the priest.

St Tibba is said to have lived in the village in the 7th century. She was buried in the church but in the early 11th century her relics were translated to Peterborough Abbey by Abbot Ælfsige (1006–1042). The remains of a small hermitage associated with the saint can be seen on the west side of the north aisle of church.

In 2019 leaking roofs had become a major problem and the church was added to the Heritage at Risk Register. Work on the roof was completed in late 2022 and the church removed from the register.
