= Oakham Market Cross =

16th/17th century market cross in Oakham, Rutland, England

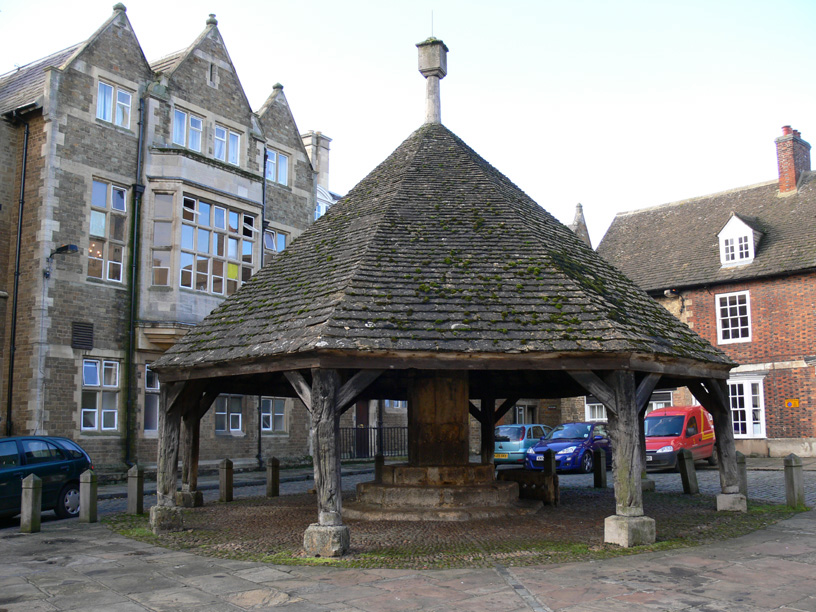

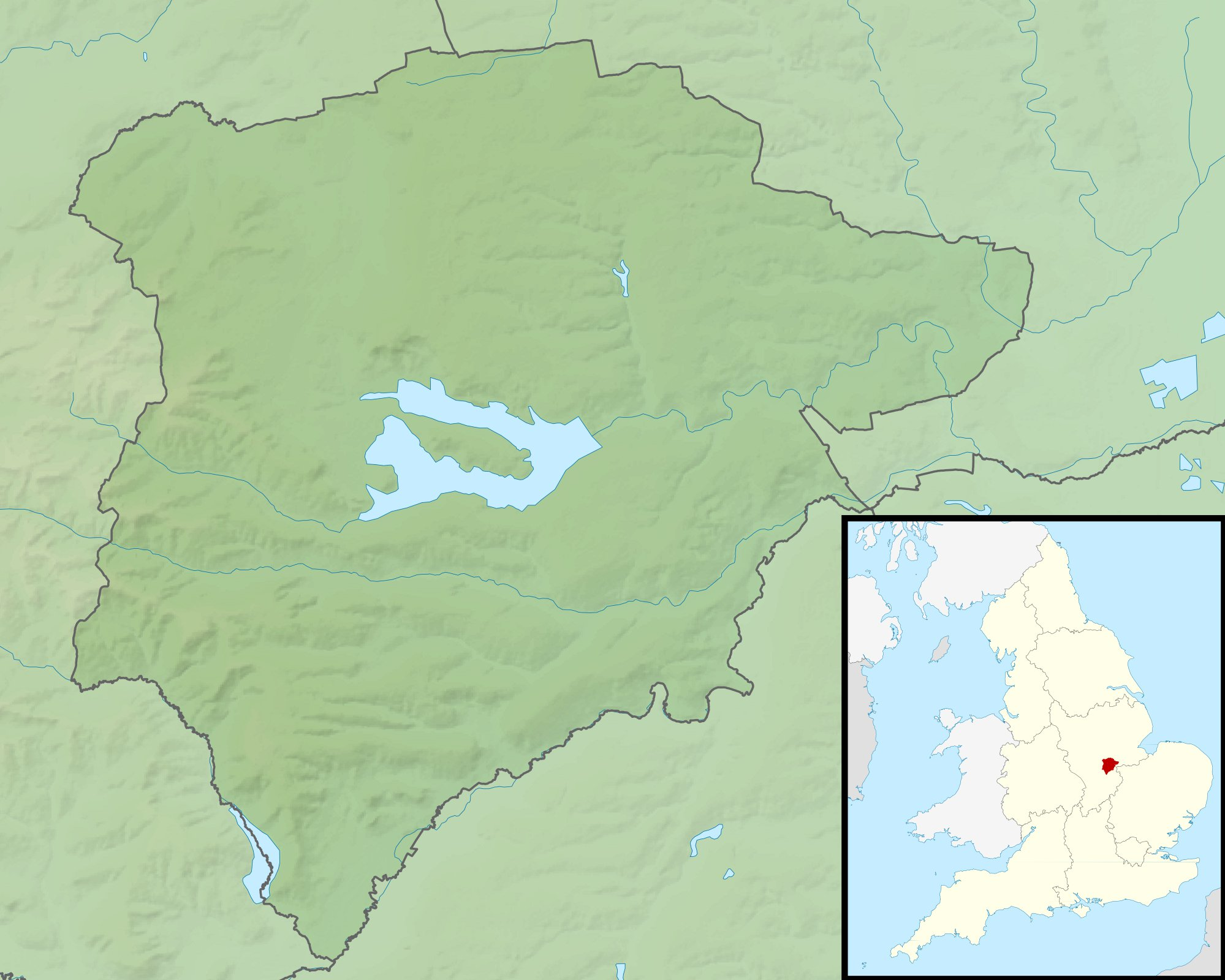
- Location within Rutland
- 52.6703°N 0.7282°W
- Type: Market cross
- Location: Oakham, Rutland

History
- Built: 16th/17th century

Listed Building – Grade I
- Official name: Market Cross
- Designated: 8 May 1950
- Reference no.: 1073278

Listed Building – Grade I
- Official name: Stocks
- Designated: 8 May 1950
- Reference no.: 1073279

Scheduled monument
- Official name: Butter Cross and Stocks
- Reference no.: 1005068

The Market Cross in Oakham, Rutland, England, is a market cross dating from the 16th or 17th century. Market crosses, also termed butter crosses, may derive from the high crosses or free-standing stones of the Early Mediaeval period. In the Middle Ages they were often used as gathering points in the centres of communities, generally as venues for regular markets. Beneath the cross is a set of stocks. Both are Grade I listed structures and the group forms a Scheduled monument.

== History and description ==
Market crosses can be found in the centres of many British towns and cities. Although their origins are unclear, they are generally believed to derive from the High crosses or free-standing stones of the Early Mediaeval period. (Note: The Scottish Mercat cross is of similar origin.) In the Middle Ages they frequently became the focal point for marketplaces, where communities gathered to trade. Historic England suggests that the presence of a cross in a marketplace may have served to "validate transactions". James Masschaele, in his study The Public Space of the Marketplace in Medieval England, notes that marketplaces also served an important social function as a location for the "retailing of news and gossip". Their religious associations led to many crosses being damaged or destroyed during the Reformation and in the aftermath of the Civil War.

The Oakham Market Cross dates from the 16th or 17th centuries. (Note: Elizabeth Williamson, in her 2003 revised volume, Leicestershire and Rutland, in the Pevsner Buildings of England series, suggests a date of the "late 17th century". The Victoria County History prefers the late 16th or early 17th centuries as a construction date.) 36 feet (11 m) in diameter, a central stone shaft and eight encircling timber posts support a tiled roof. The stocks stand immediately next to the central shaft. They are unusual in that they have five openings, rather than the more common four or six. The cross and the stocks are both Grade I listed structures. The group forms a Scheduled monument.

== Sources ==
- Masschaele, James (April 2002). "The Public Space of the Marketplace in Medieval England". Journal of the Medieval Academy of America. 77 (2): 383–412. doi:10.2307/3301326. JSTOR 3301326. S2CID 162569055.
- Page, William (1935). A History of the County of Rutland. Victoria County History. Vol. 2. London: Victoria County History. OCLC 56226839.
- Pevsner, Nikolaus; Williamson, Elizabeth (2003). Leicestershire and Rutland. Buildings of England. New Haven, US and London: Yale University Press. ISBN 9780300096187. OCLC 49298894.
