= St Mary's Church, Morcott =

Church in Morcott, Rutland

Coordinates: 52°35′49″N 0°38′11″W

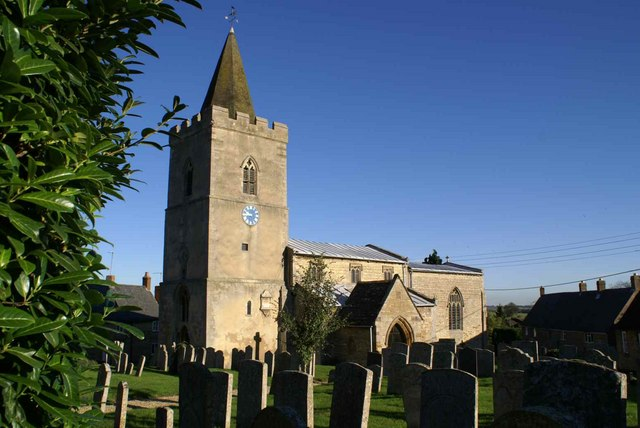
- Denomination: Church of England

History
- Dedication: St Mary the Virgin

Administration
- Diocese: Peterborough
- Parish: Morcott, Rutland

Clergy
- Vicar(s): Rev Stephen Gamble

St Mary's Church is the Church of England parish church in Morcott, Rutland. It is a Grade I listed building.

== History ==
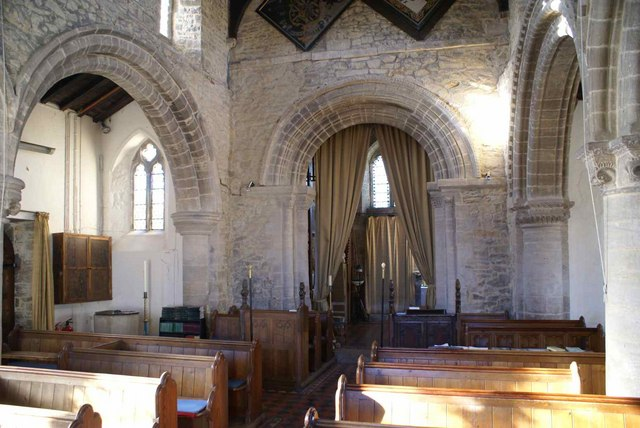
Nave interior, looking towards the tower arch

The Norman church features a 'pancake' window on the west side of the tower, and a north arcade considered to be "the best example of Norman work in the area". The chancel arch has a carving of two serpents swallowing each other's tails. The nave is Norman and the arcade columns are also carved.

Other parts of the church date to rebuilding in the 14th century and from the Victorian Restoration.

The pulpit is Jacobean. There is a tomb to William de Overtoun whose family were the Lords of the Manor. They lived at Morcott Hall, then called Overtoun Hall.
