= Church of St Mary the Virgin, Greetham =

Church in Greetham, Rutland, England

Coordinates: 52°43′18″N 0°37′57″W

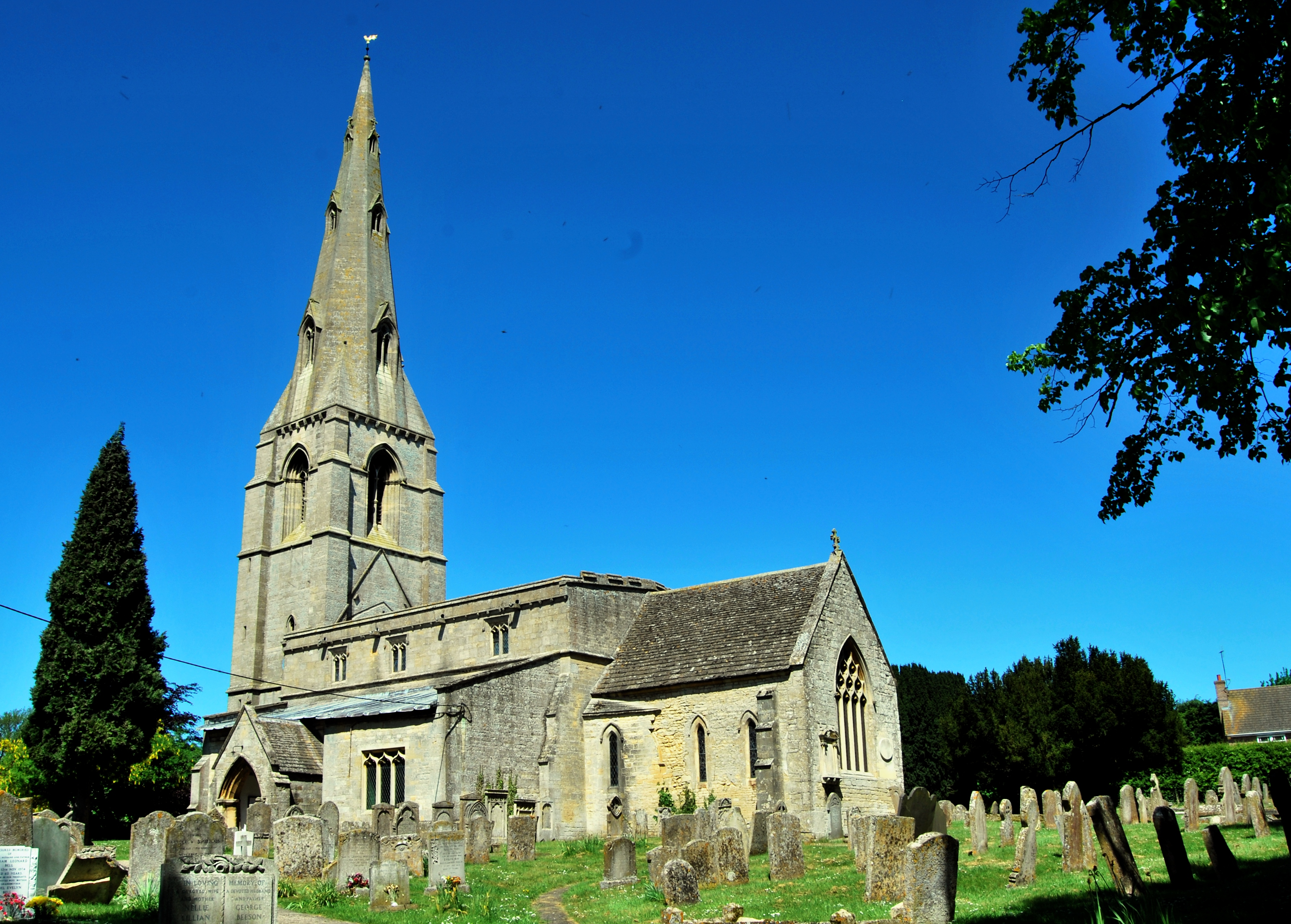
- Denomination: Church of England

History
- Dedication: St Mary the Virgin

Administration
- Diocese: Peterborough
- Parish: Greetham, Rutland

Clergy
- Vicar(s): Anthony Oram
- Pastor(s): Marcus Purnell

The Church of St Mary the Virgin is the Church of England parish church in Greetham, Rutland. It is a Grade I listed building.

== History ==
The oldest parts are Norman, but the church today is largely as it was rebuilt in the 13th–15th centuries. An Anglo-Saxon tympanum is on the west wall next to part of a Norman tympanum and some moulding from the 12th century. 12th-century carving is also present in the font which is tub shaped and decorated with leaves and joined by a dogtooth frieze.

There is wood panelling carved with biblical scenes in the chancel. It dates from somewhere between the Saxon and Georgian era, the church says that it is Jacobean. It is said to be from Sussex though that is probably unlikely. One panel shows a serpent looking on to an angel driving away Adam and Eve from the Garden of Eden. One shows the dove coming back to Noah's Ark and another depicts some saints. Daniel in the lion's den appears on one and another shows Moses with his staff striking a rock. The chancel dates from the 13th century and has lancet windows with stained glass showing the Four Evangelists.

The north door was blocked when the tower was built. The west tower and spire are 13th or 14th century and the south porch was built in 1673.

The clerestory, chancel arch and north arcade were all built in the 14th century. The Jacobean pulpit has carved panels. In the north aisle are the royal coat of arms of George I, reading "Fear God, Honour the King".

In 1897 the church was restored by Jethro Cossins. The church looks like what it did in the 14th century after every facing stone was reset.
