= North Luffenham =

Village in Rutland, England

Coordinates: 52.622°N 0.622°W

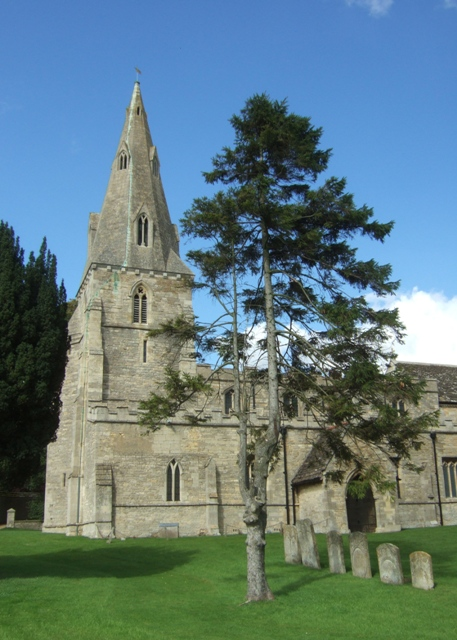
- Church of St John the Baptist, North Luffenham

- Location within Rutland
- Area: 3.18 sq mi (8.2 km^{2})
- Population: 704 2001 Census
  - Density: 221/sq mi (85/km^{2})
- OS grid reference: SK934035
  - London: 80 miles (130 km) SSE
- Unitary authority: Rutland
- Shire county: Rutland
- Ceremonial county: Rutland
- Region: East Midlands
- Country: England
- Sovereign state: United Kingdom
- Post town: OAKHAM
- Postcode district: LE15
- Dialling code: 01780
- Police: Leicestershire
- Fire: Leicestershire
- Ambulance: East Midlands
- UK Parliament: Rutland and Stamford

North Luffenham is a village in Rutland, in the East Midlands of England. The population of the civil parish at the 2001 census was 704, decreasing to 679 at the 2011 census. It lies to the north of the River Chater, 5 miles (8.0 km) east of Uppingham and 7 miles (11 km) west of Stamford. Located to the north of the village is St George's Barracks, formerly RAF North Luffenham.

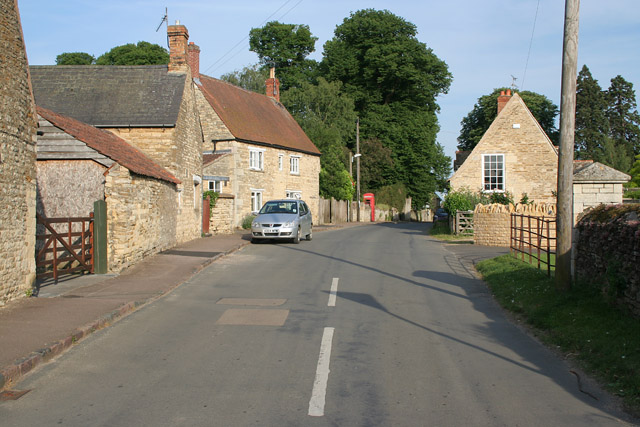
Church Street

== History ==
The village's name means 'homestead/village of Luffa'.

Discovery of an Anglo-Saxon cemetery to the north of the modern village suggests that there were people living here in the village in the 5th and 6th centuries A.D. The village grew and prospered during the Middle Ages.

In the 17th century the village was the scene of a small English Civil War siege when in 1642 Lord Grey and his parliamentary forces were gathered at Leicester. With gunpowder and ammunition taken in raids on Oakham, they marched to Brooke to arrest Viscount Campden. Henry Noel, a known royalist, heard of this and decided to take a "little guard" into his house, Luffenham Hall. Disappointed at Brooke, Lord Grey and his 1300 soldiers made their way to North Luffenham, destroying the nearby hamlet of Sculthorpe and surrounded the Hall. There was little actual fighting, although the church register does record the burial of an unnamed parliamentary soldier on 21 February 1642. Outnumbered by seven to one, Henry Noel had little choice but to surrender. The Hall was plundered and the parliamentary soldiers attacked the nearby church, smashing windows and defacing a memorial statue of Henry Noel's first wife (the damage to the fingers and nose can still be seen). Noel was taken as a prisoner to London, where he died shortly afterwards.

The original Luffenham Hall (the village school is now on the site) was built in around 1635 and belonged to the Noel family. Although besieged during the Civil War it was occupied by the Noels until the 18th century. It was demolished in 1806. All that remains is the garden ha-ha (a sunken boundary wall) and outbuildings along Church Street.

To the east of the parish church is the present day North Luffenham Hall. Built in the mid-1500s, this was originally Digby Manor House and only later became known as North Luffenham (or Luffenham) Hall.

The Church of St John the Baptist is a fine antique fabric, with a tower surmounted by a spire. The churchyard contains 31 graves maintained by the Commonwealth War Graves Commission. These include 11 Canadian servicemen who died after World War II while North Luffenham was a RCAF base in the 1950s.

Archdeacon Robert Johnson (1540–1625) was Rector of North Luffenham for 51 years, from 1574 until his death; he founded Oakham and Uppingham Schools in 1584, as well as other charitable institutions including almshouses.

St Mary & St John's Primary School is a Voluntary Aided Church of England school. It is built on the site of North Luffenham Hall and the southern boundary is a ha-ha.

One pub remains in the village; The Fox (previously The Fox & Hounds). The Horse & Panniers (popularly known as The Nag & Bag) closed in 2013, and is now a guest house.

Arts & Crafts architect C. F. A. Voysey designed The Pastures in 1903 and he also worked on another house in the village.

== See also ==
- North Luffenham Quarry SSSI
- Vincent Wing
