= Church of St John the Baptist, North Luffenham =

Church in North Luffenham, Rutland

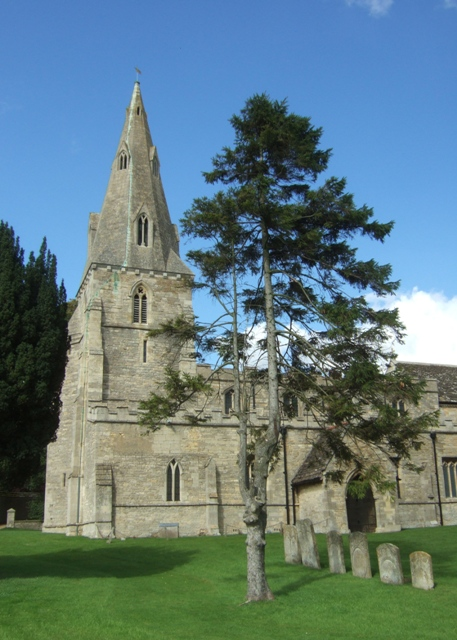
- Church of St John the Baptist, North Luffenham
- 52°37′09″N 0°37′16″W
- Denomination: Church of England

History
- Dedication: St John the Baptist

Administration
- Diocese: Peterborough
- Parish: North Luffenham, Rutland

The Church of St John the Baptist is a church in North Luffenham, Rutland. It is Grade I listed.

== History ==
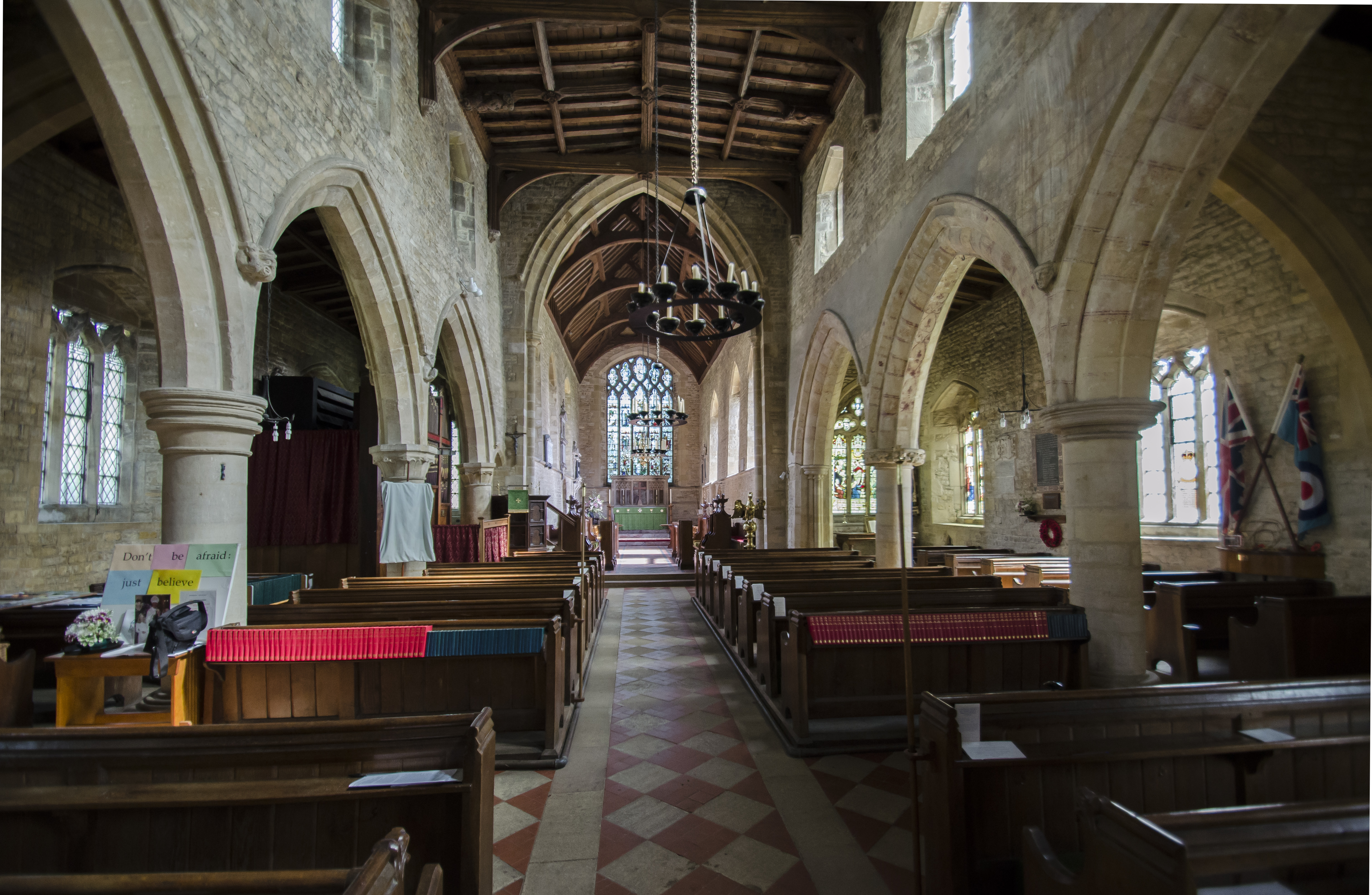
Interior

The church dates to the 11th century. In the 13th and 14th centuries the north aisle was built and later, the south aisle. The tower, which has an unusual stair turret, was also built at this time.

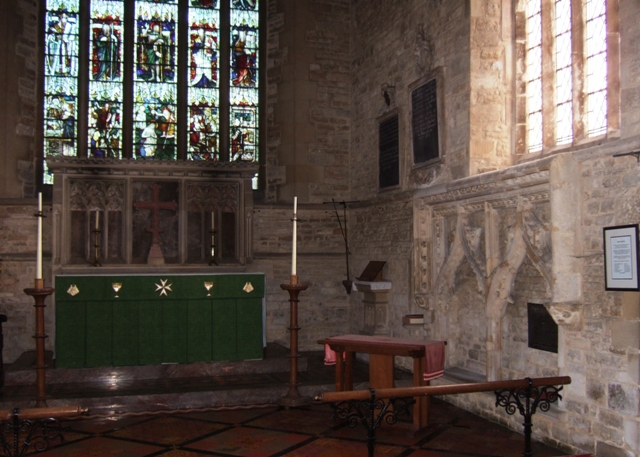
The chancel showing the sedilia

The chancel was built in the early 14th century and has a double sedilia, which contains a plaque commemorating Archdeacon Robert Johnson, who founded Oakham and Uppingham Schools. Johnson was Rector of North Luffenham for 51 years, from 1574 until his death.

The font dates to the 14th century and is octagonal.

The former Lord of the Manor of North Luffenham, John Digby, gifted a brass chandelier to the church which can still be seen.

A wall memorial to Susanna Noel was damaged during the 1643 sack of North Luffenham by Parliamentary troops under Lord Grey.

The churchyard contains 31 graves maintained by the Commonwealth War Graves Commission. These include two servicemen from World War I, 18 air force casualties from World War II as well as 11 Canadian servicemen who died while RAF North Luffenham was a RCAF base after World War II.

The remains of Luffenham House stands to the east of the church.
