= Oakham =

Market and county town of Rutland, England

Coordinates: 52.6705°N 0.7333°W

- Town
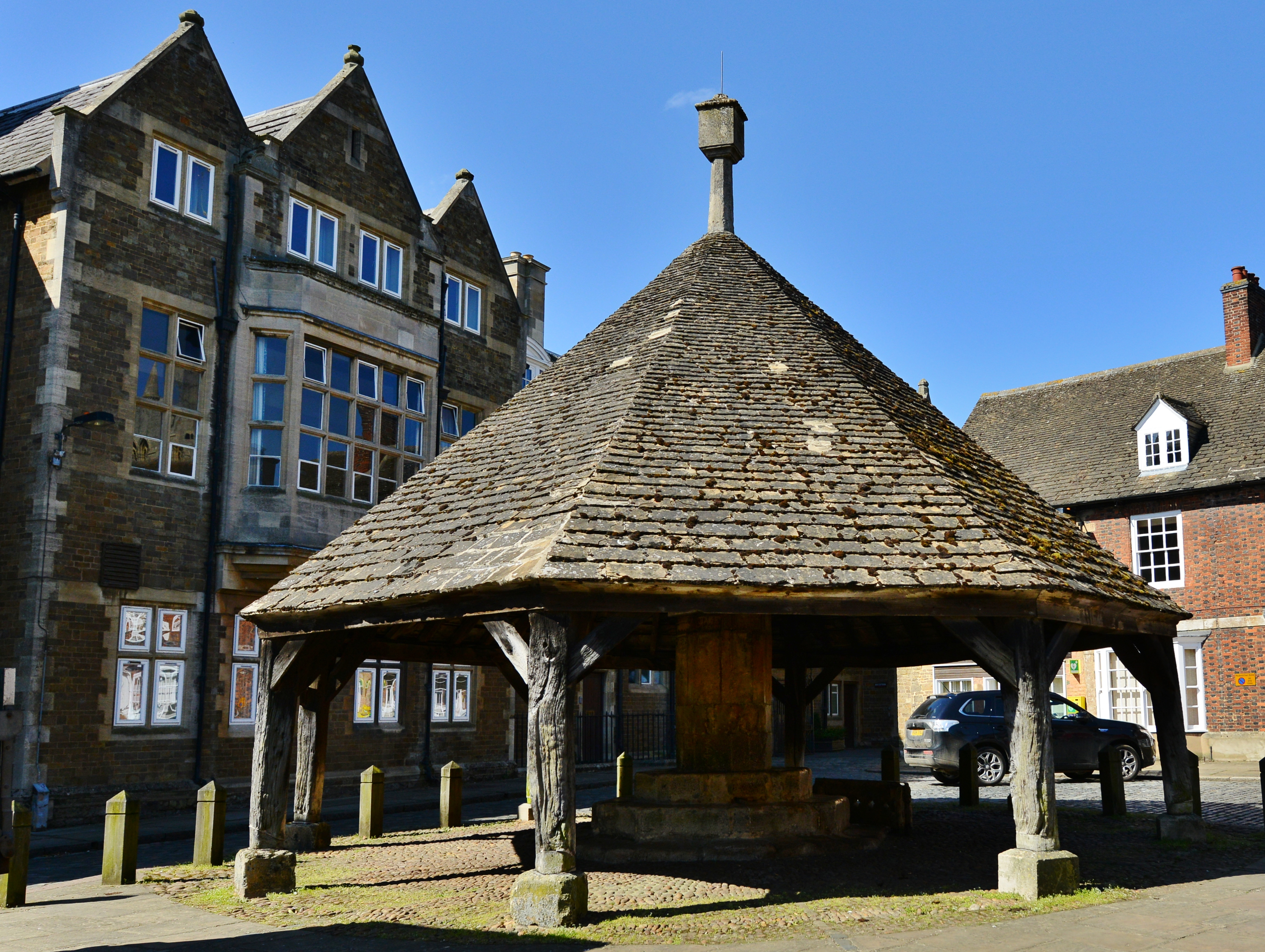
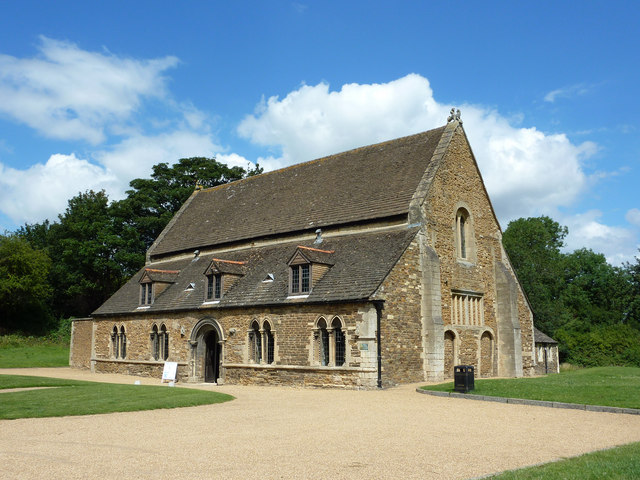
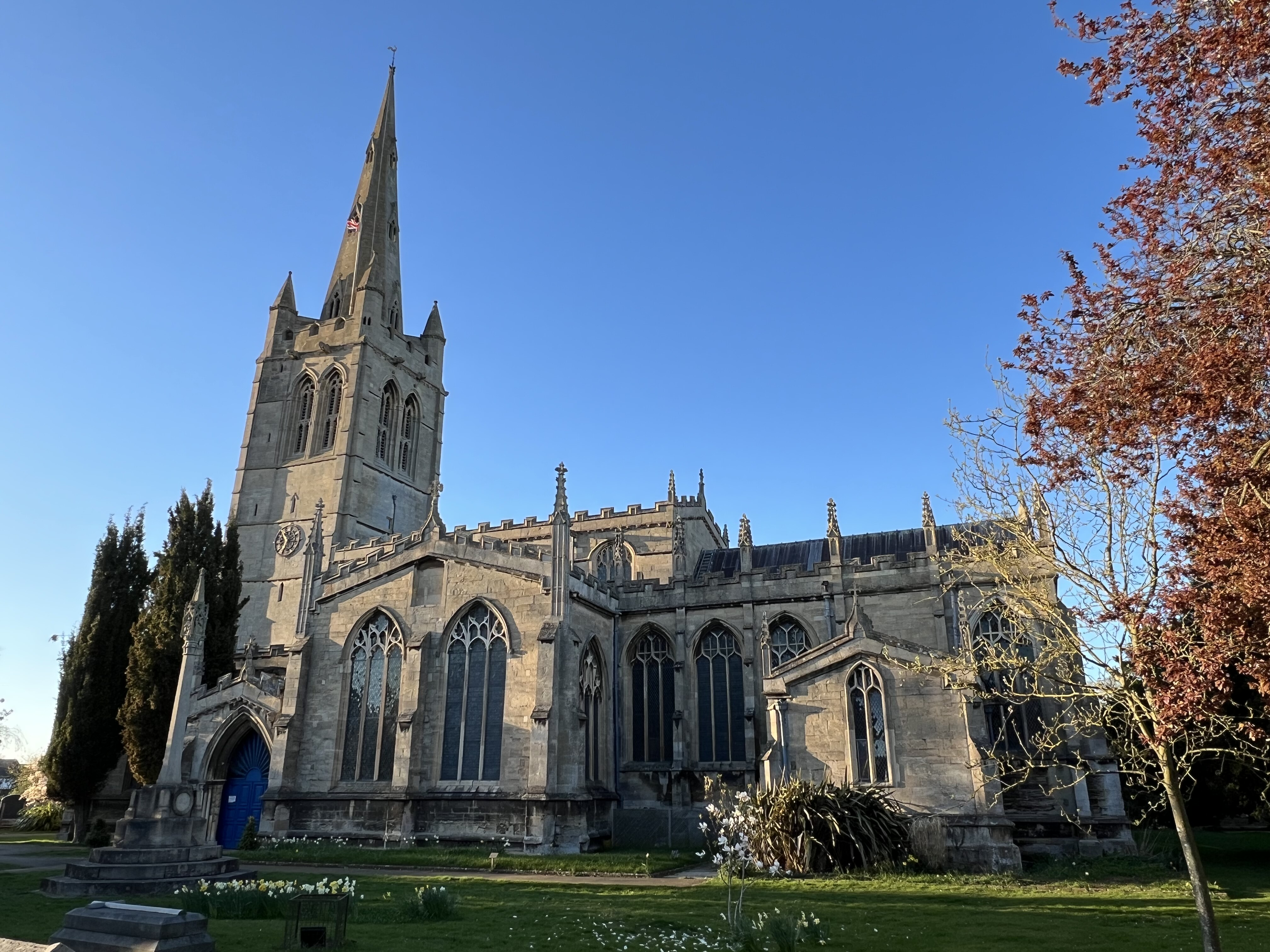
- Market Cross Oakham Castle All Saints Church

- Location within Rutland
- Population: 12,149 (2021 Census)
- OS grid reference: SK857088
- Civil parish: Oakham
- Unitary authority: Rutland
- Ceremonial county: Rutland
- Region: East Midlands
- Country: England
- Sovereign state: United Kingdom
- Areas of the town: List: Barleythorpe (Village); Burley (Village); Egleton (Village); Langham (Village); Town Centre
- Post town: OAKHAM
- Postcode district: LE15
- Dialling code: 01572
- Police: Leicestershire
- Fire: Leicestershire
- Ambulance: East Midlands
- UK Parliament: Rutland and Stamford
- Website: https://oakhamtowncouncil.gov.uk/

Oakham is a market town and civil parish in Rutland (of which it is the county town) in the East Midlands of England. The town is located 25 miles (40 kilometres) east of Leicester, 28 miles (45 km) southeast of Nottingham and 23 miles (37 km) northwest of Peterborough. It had a population of 12,149 in the 2021 census. Oakham is to the west of Rutland Water and in the Vale of Catmose. Its height above sea level ranges from 325 to 400 ft (100 to 120 m).

== Toponymy ==
The name of the town means "homestead or village of Oc(c)a" or "hemmed-in land of Oc(c)a".

== Governance ==
There are two tiers of local government covering Oakham, at parish (town) and unitary authority level: Oakham Town Council and Rutland County Council. The town council is based at Rol House on Long Row. The county council is also based in the town, at Catmose House.

Oakham was an ancient parish, and gave its name to the Oakham Hundred, one of the five historic hundreds of Rutland. When elected parish and district councils were created under the Local Government Act 1894, Oakham was given a parish council and included in the Oakham Rural District. The parish was removed from the rural district in 1911 to become the Oakham Urban District, with the parish council being replaced by an urban district council. The urban district was abolished in 1974 and a new parish council established, taking the name Oakham Town Council.

Oakham, along with the rest of Rutland, has been represented at Westminster by the Conservative Member of Parliament Alicia Kearns since 2019.

== Demography ==
Women in the Oakham South East ward had the fifth-highest life expectancy at birth, 95.7 years, of any ward in England and Wales in 2016.

The urban area of the town now extends into the neighbouring parish of Barleythorpe, to the north-west of the town centre.

== Landmarks ==
Tourist attractions in Oakham include All Saints' Church and Oakham Castle. Another historic feature is the open-air market held in the town's market place every Wednesday and Saturday. Nearby is the Buttercross with an octagonal stone-slate roof and the wooden stocks – both Grade I listed structures.

=== All Saints' Church ===
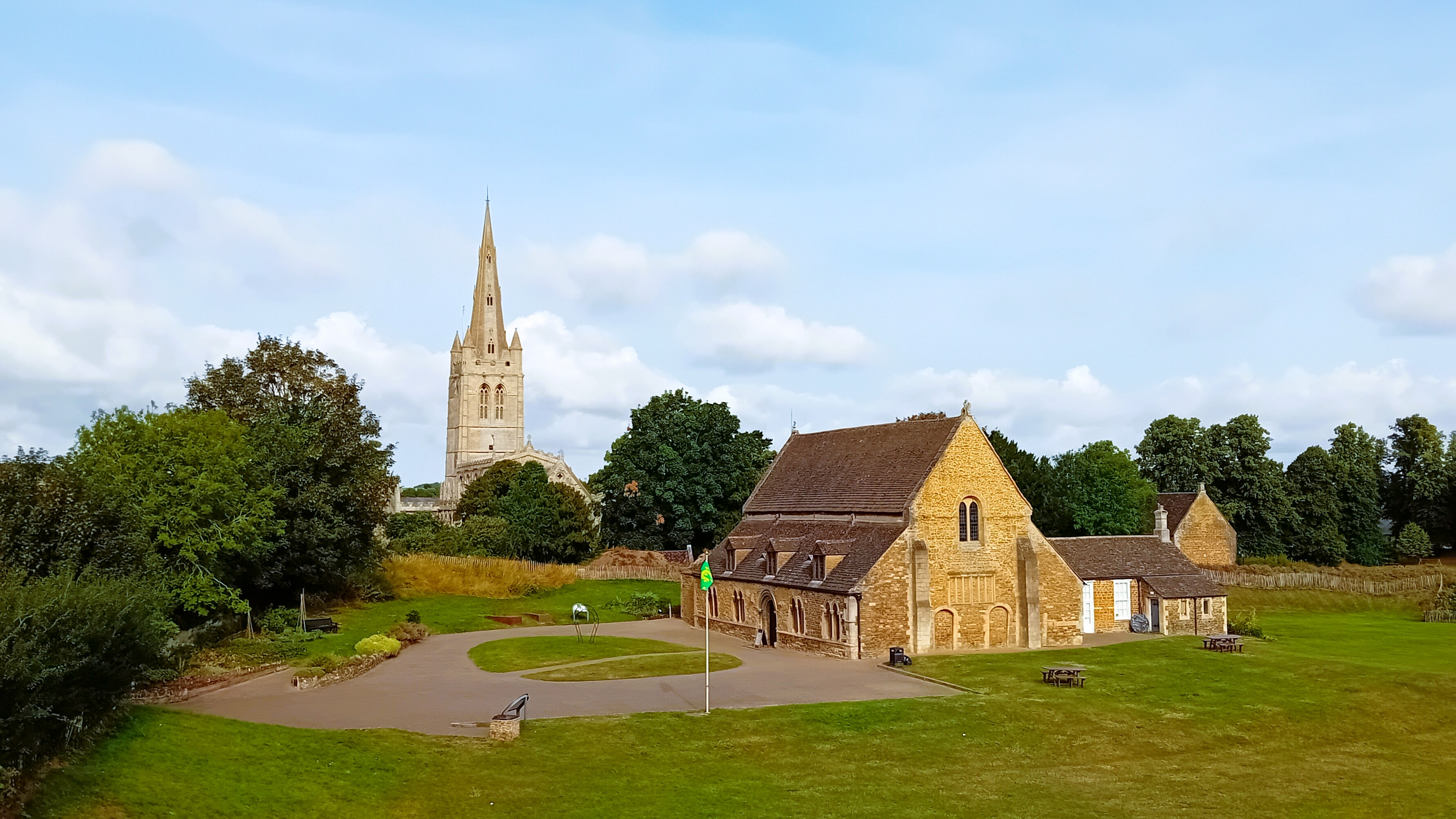
The great hall of Oakham Castle, with the spire of All Saints' Church beyond

The spire of Oakham parish church, built during the 14th century, dominates distant views of the town for several miles in all directions. Restored in 1857–1858 by Sir George Gilbert Scott, the church is a Grade I listed building.

=== Oakham Castle ===
Only the great hall of the Norman castle is still standing, surrounded by steep earthworks marking the inner bailey. The hall dates from about 1180–1190. The architectural historian Nikolaus Pevsner, in his Leicestershire and Rutland volume of the Buildings of England series, noted; "It is the earliest hall of any English castle surviving so completely, and it is doubly interesting in that it belonged not to a castle strictly speaking, but rather to a fortified manor house." The building is decorated with Romanesque architectural details, including six carvings of musicians. It is a Grade I listed building. The hall was in use as an assize court until 1970 and is still occasionally used as a coroner's court or Crown Court. It is also licensed for weddings.

The outer bailey of the castle, which is still surrounded by low earthworks, lies to the north of the castle. Known as Cutts Close, it is now a park. The park has some deep hollows which are remnants of the castle's dried-up stew ponds (fishponds). A Castle-class corvette named HMS Oakham Castle was launched in July 1944.

=== The Wisteria Hotel (4 Catmos Street) ===
The Wisteria Hotel (formerly The Old Wisteria Hotel and The Boultons Hotel) at 4 Catmos Street, Oakham, is a Grade II-listed boutique hotel incorporating an early 18th-century chequered-brick frontage and a 1604 quarried-stone hunting lodge.

The property was converted from a private residence into a hotel and licensed restaurant in 1979 by the Boulton family, trading as The Boultons Hotel, with an initial two-storey extension approved in 1982. By July 1986, the hotel was acquired by hotelier Emad Saleeb—a HCIMA-qualified manager formerly with Grand Metropolitan Hotels and Hilton International—who oversaw its major physical transformation into a 25-bedroom hotel. Following frontage and porch alterations in 1986 (designed by Thomas E. Wilson Associates), Saleeb secured Listed Building Consent in December 1988 (designed by A. McCombie-Smith, RIBA) to demolish a rear outbuilding and erect a major extension providing twelve en-suite bedrooms, a function room, and ancillary accommodation, later rebranding the business as The Old Wisteria Hotel.

In April 2007, the business was incorporated as The Old Wisteria Hotel Ltd, operated by family directors Emad Saleeb, Deborah Jean Saleeb, Daniel Saleeb, and Rebecca Saleeb until March 2018, when it was sold to hoteliers Kristy Carey and Chris Newsham and relaunched following refurbishment as The Wisteria Hotel.

=== Oakham's horseshoes ===
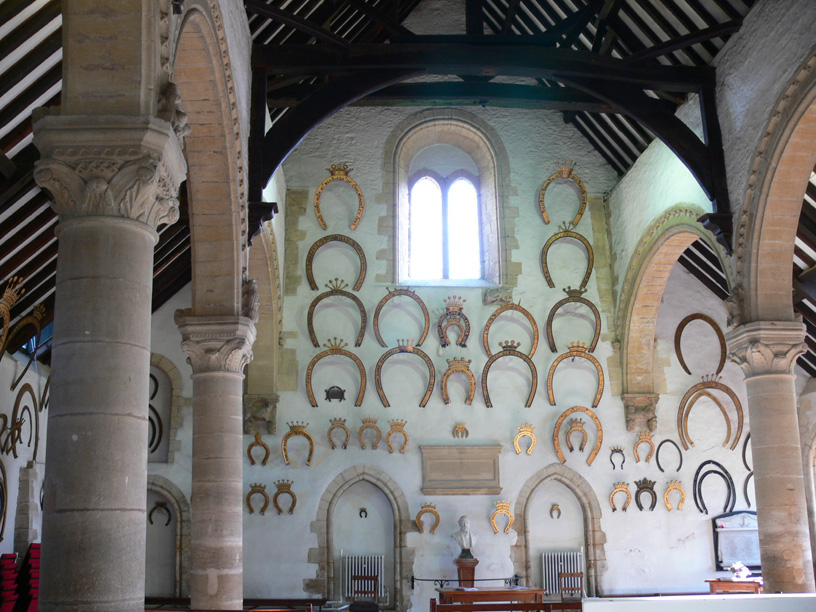
Ceremonial horseshoes in Oakham Castle

Traditionally, members of royalty and peers of the realm who visited or passed through the town had to pay a forfeit in the form of a horseshoe. This unique custom has been enforced for over 500 years, but nowadays it only happens on special occasions (such as royal visits), when an outsize ceremonial horseshoe, specially made and decorated, is hung in the great hall of the castle. There are now over 200 of these commemorative shoes on its walls. Not all are dated and some of the earliest (which would doubtless have been ordinary horseshoes given without ceremony by exasperated noblemen) may not have survived. The earliest datable one is an outsize example commemorating a visit by King Edward IV in about 1470. Recent horseshoes commemorate visits by Princess Anne (1999), Prince Charles (2003) and Princess Alexandra (2005).

The horseshoes hang with the ends pointing down; while this is generally held to be unlucky, in Rutland this was thought to stop the Devil from sitting in the hollow. The horseshoe motif appears in the county council's arms and on Ruddles beer labels, although it has been inverted to the usual position for the latter by current owner Greene King.

=== Rutland County Museum ===
The museum is located in the old Riding School of the Rutland Fencible Cavalry which was built in 1794–1795. The museum houses a collection of objects relating to local rural and agricultural life, social history and archaeology.

=== Statue of Queen Elizabeth II ===
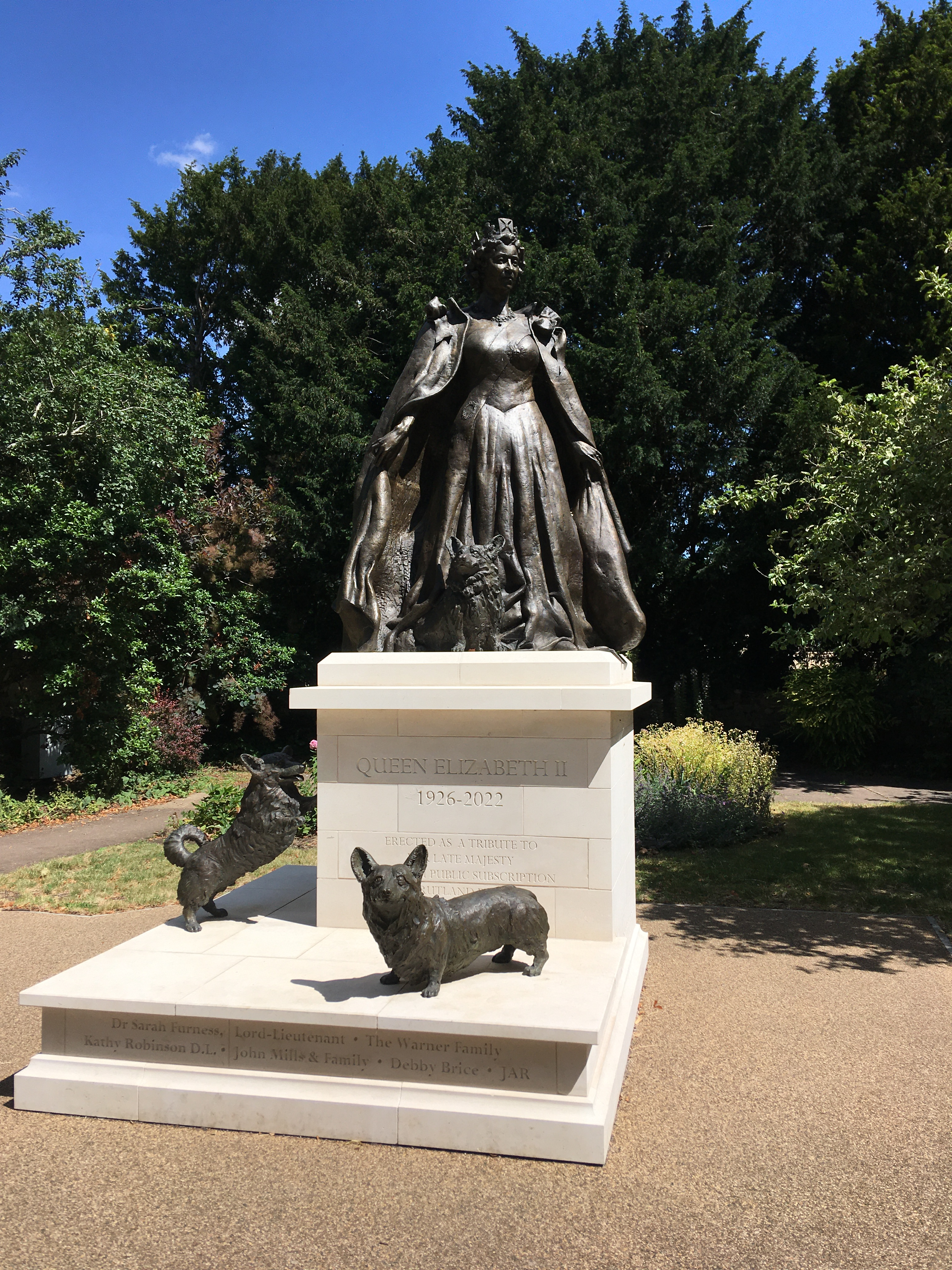

A statue of Elizabeth II by Hywel Pratley was unveiled on 21 April 2024, which would have been the 98th birthday of the late Queen. The 7ft (2.1m) tall sculpture on a limestone base was commissioned by the Lord Lieutenant of Rutland and funded through donations from businesses and members of the public, at the cost of £125,000.

== Transport ==
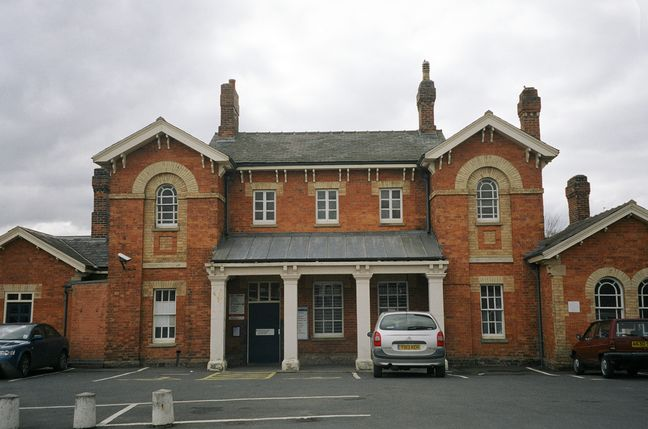
Oakham station frontage

Oakham railway station is a stop on the Birmingham–Peterborough line. It is served by two train operating companies:

- CrossCountry operates a generally hourly service between Birmingham New Street, Leicester, Peterborough, Cambridge and Stansted Airport.
- East Midlands Railway operate a small number of services in the morning and evening to Norwich, Nottingham, Kettering, Melton Mowbray and Peterborough.

Most bus services in Oakham are operated by Centrebus and Blands. Routes link the town with Corby, Melton Mowbray and Stamford.

The Oakham Canal connected the town to the Melton Mowbray Navigation, the River Soar and the national waterways system between 1802 and 1847.

== Media ==
Local news and television programmes are provided by BBC East Midlands and ITV Central. Television signals are received from the Waltham TV transmitter.

Rutland's local radio stations are BBC Radio Leicester on 104.9 FM, Smooth East Midlands on 106.6 FM, Hits Radio East Midlands on 106.0 FM, Greatest Hits Radio Midlands (which used to be Rutland Radio) on 107.2 FM, Sabras Radio on 91.0 FM and Rutland and Stamford Sound, a community based radio station which broadcast on DAB and online to the county and Stamford in Lincolnshire.

The Rutland Mercury and Rutland Times are the local newspapers that serve the area.

== Education ==
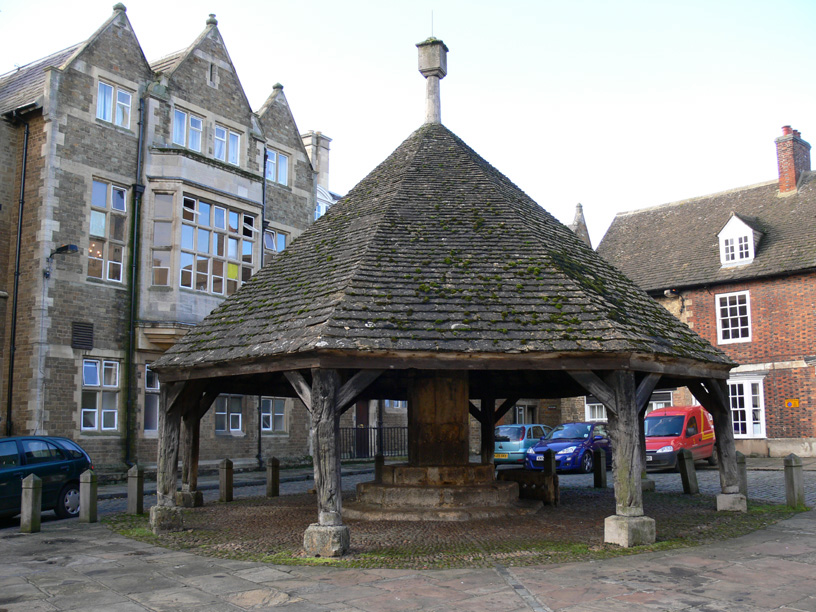
Oakham Market Cross, with Oakham School beyond

Oakham School is an English public school, founded together with Uppingham School in 1584. The original school building survives, north-east of the church. It has across its south front the inscription Schola Latina – Graeca – Hebraica A° 1584 and above its door a stone with an inscription in Latin, Greek and Hebrew.

Oakham School is the owner of the town's former workhouse. Built in 1836–1837 by the Oakham Poor Law Union, it held 167 inmates until its conversion into Catmose Vale Hospital. It now contains two of the school houses for girls.

Catmose College, founded in 1920, is a state-funded secondary school. Harington School is a sixth form centre next to it. Rutland County College, previously Rutland Sixth Form College, moved from the outskirts of the town to Great Casterton.

== Sports and recreation ==
Oakham United Football Club won the Peterborough and District Football League in 2015 and gained promotion to the United Counties League First Division. It currently plays in the Peterborough & District League Premier Division.

Oakham Rugby Football Club plays at the Rutland Showground.

Oakham Cricket Club plays at the Lime Kilns off Cricket Lawns.

== Notable people ==
- Stuart Broad (born 1986), cricketer, studied at Oakham School.
- John Furley (1847–1909), cricketer
- Sir Jeffrey Hudson (1619 – c. 1682) became a royal court dwarf.
- Tom Marshall – artist and photo colouriser, grew up in Oakham.
- Thomas Merton (1915–1968), a religious scholar, studied at Oakham School in 1929–1932.
- Titus Oates (1649–1705), perjuror
- Jonnie Peacock (born 1993), Paralympic runner, relocated his home to just outside Oakham School in 2013.
- Weston Stewart (1887–1969), Anglican bishop

== Twin towns ==
Oakham is twinned with:

- Barmstedt, Germany
- Dodgeville, Wisconsin, United States

== Gallery ==
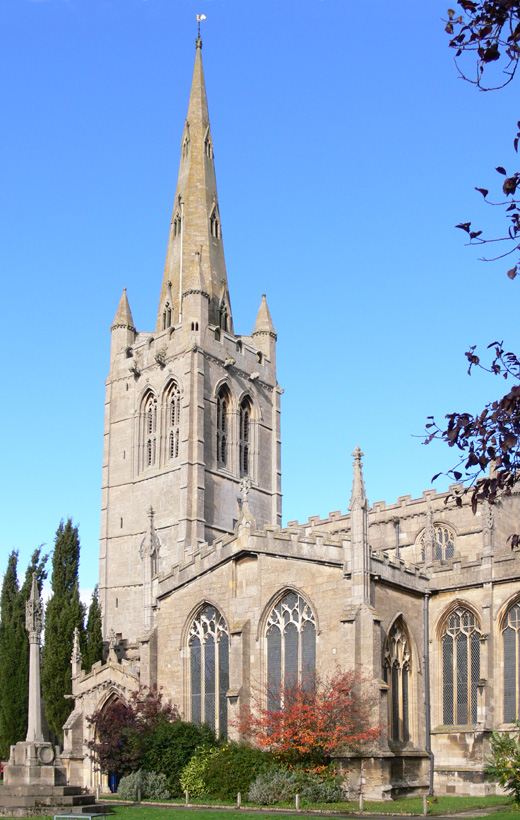
All Saints' Church from footpath between Church Street and Market Place

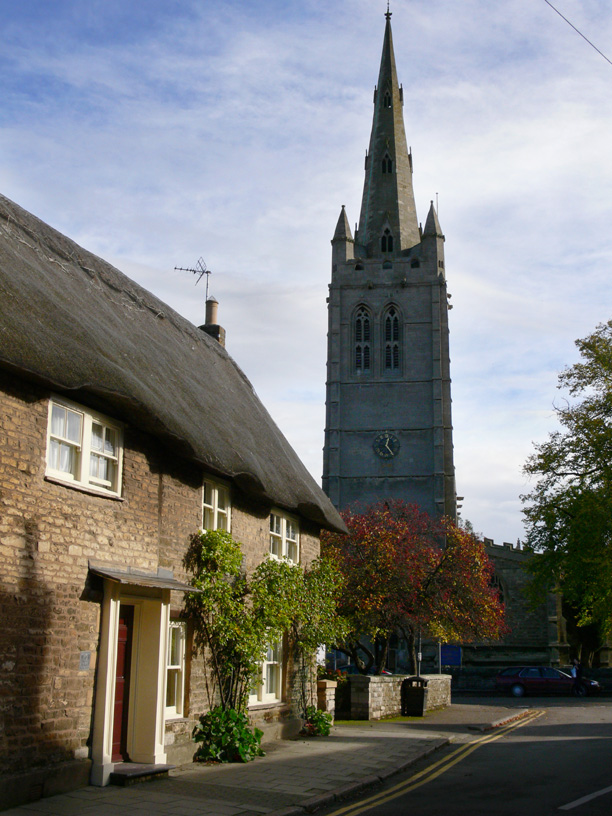
All Saints' Church seen from Northgate

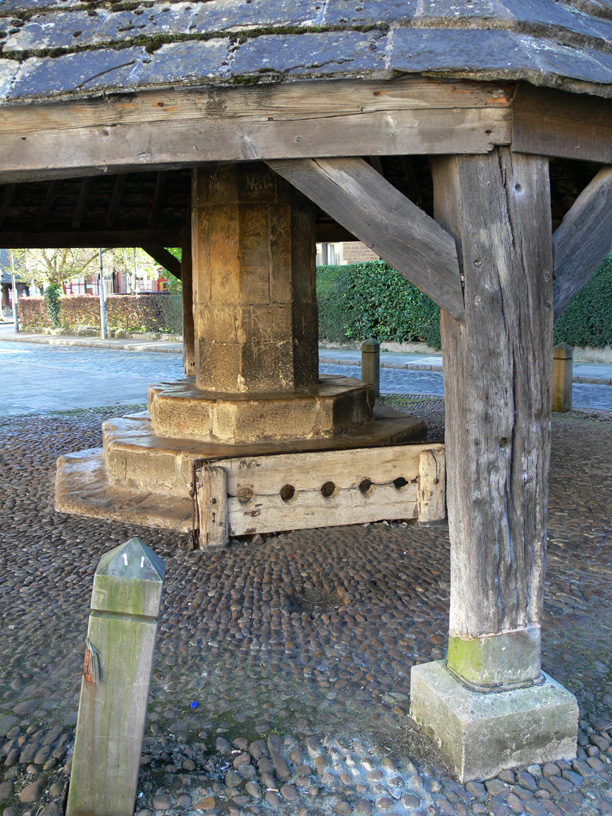
The stocks, under the Buttercross

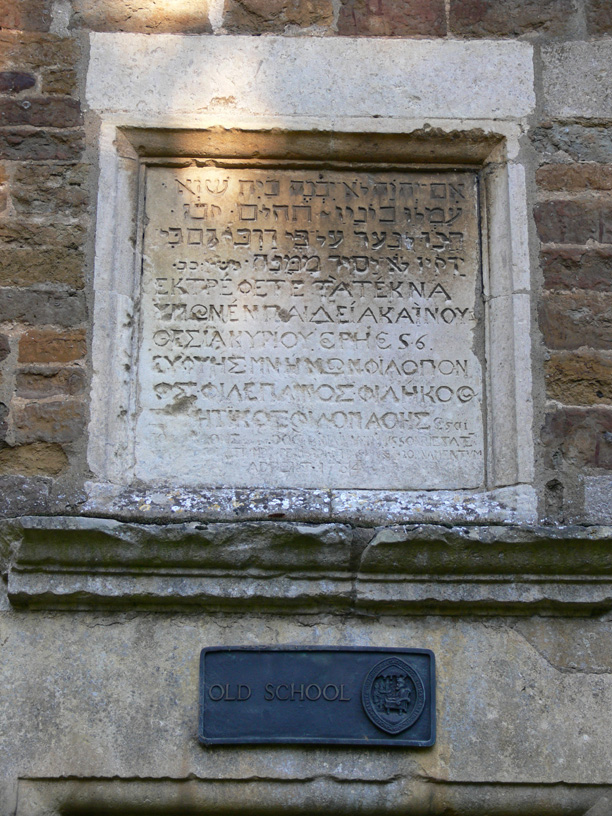
Inscription above the Old School door

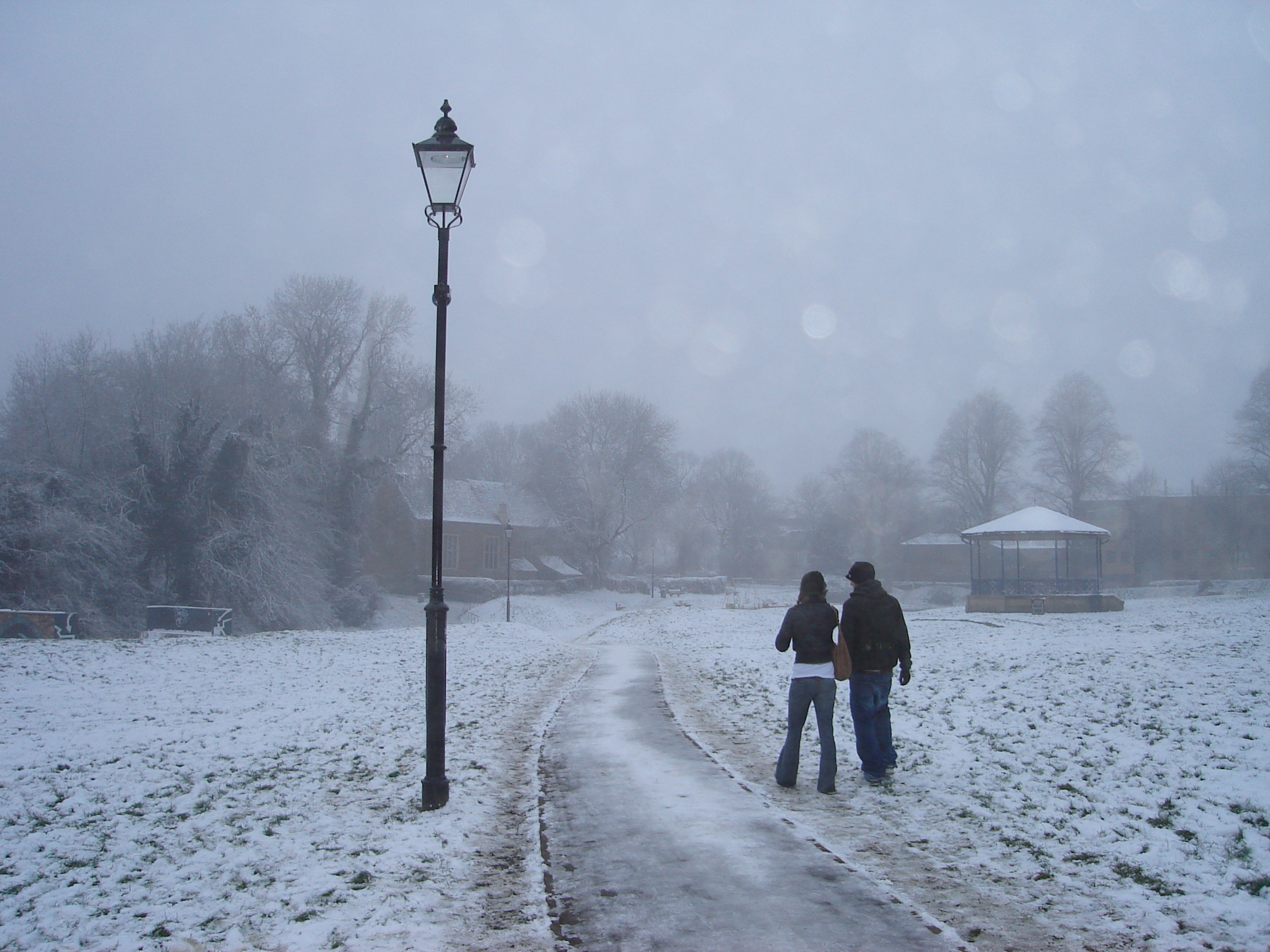
Cutts Close park - looking southwest towards the original Oakham School building, with the bandstand to the right

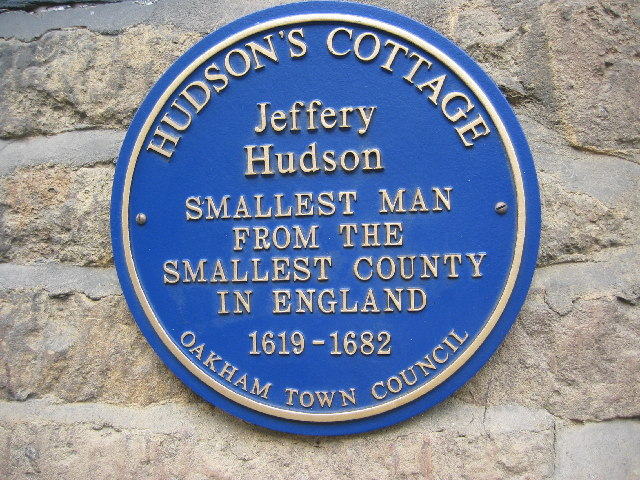
Plaque on Jeffery Hudson's Cottage

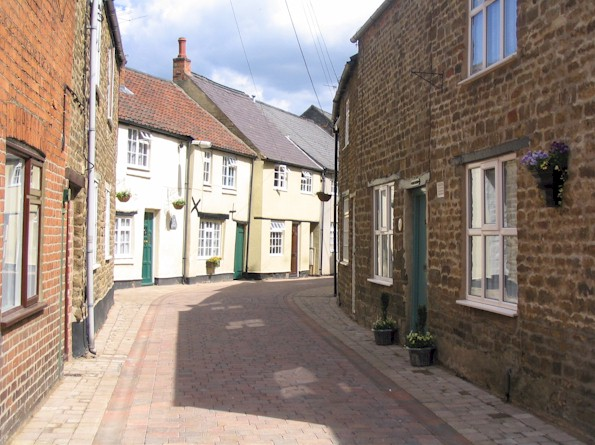
Dean's Street, a quiet back street

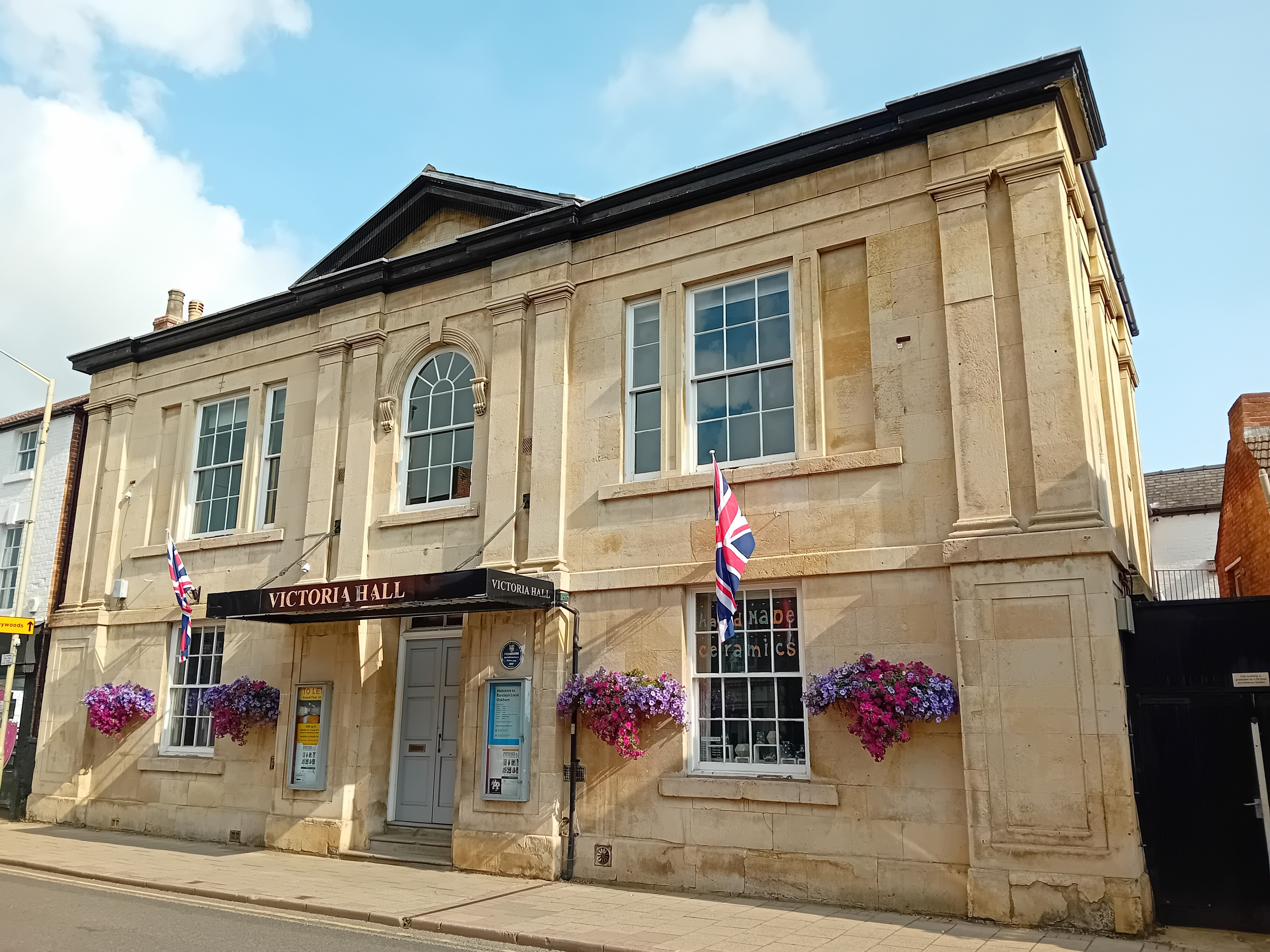
Victoria Hall, built 1839, serves as a community venue and public hall
