= James Bradshaw (cricketer, born 1902) =

English cricketer

James Cecil Bradshaw (25 January 1902 – 8 November 1984) was an English cricketer active from 1923 to 1933 who played for Leicestershire. He was born in Romford and died in Minehead. He appeared in 181 first-class matches as a righthanded batsman who sometimes kept wicket. He scored 5,051 runs with a highest score of 140 among three centuries and took completed 68 catches.
