= List of Sites of Special Scientific Interest in Rutland =

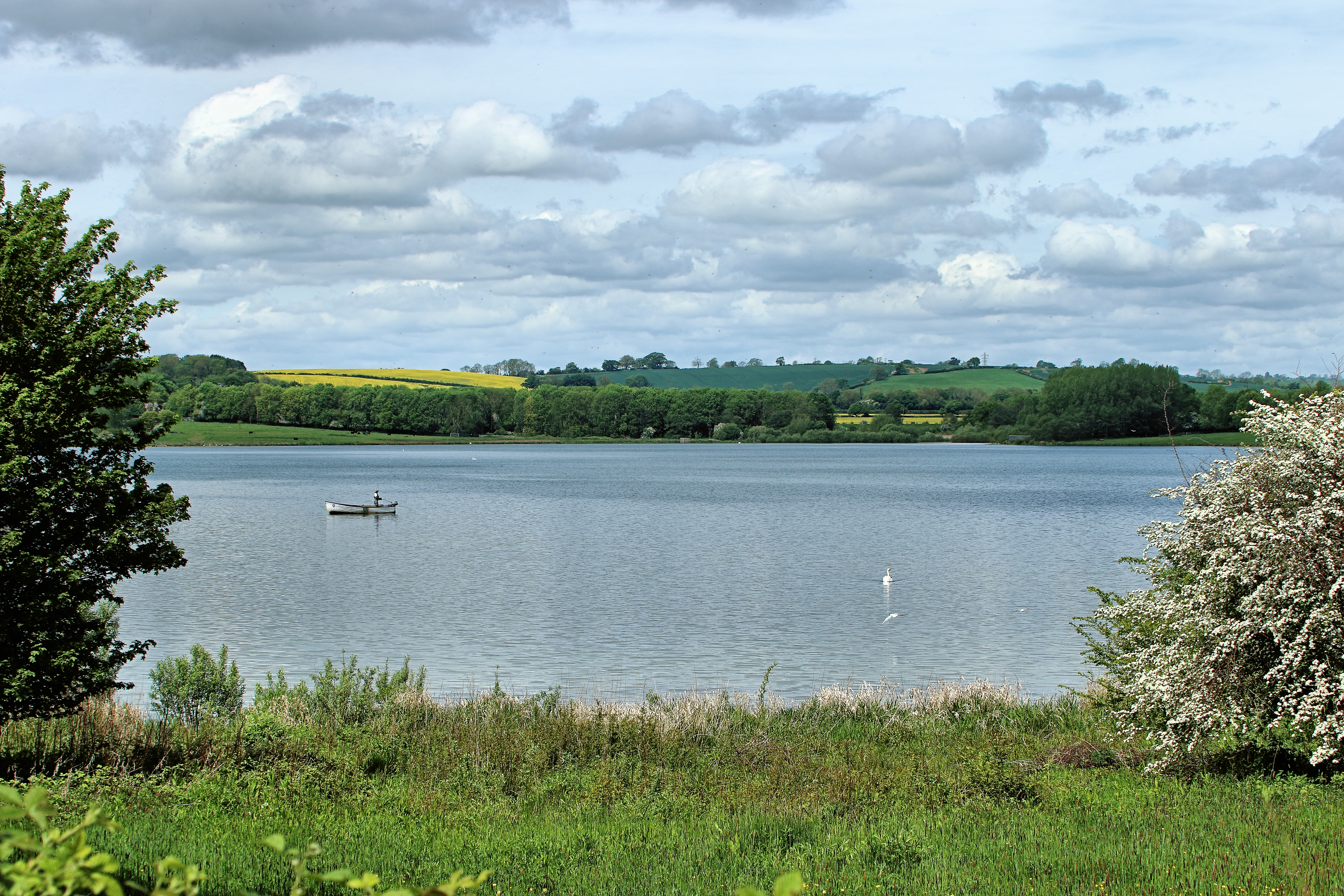
Rutland Water

Rutland is a landlocked ceremonial county in the East Midlands of England. In 1974 it was merged to be part of the administrative county of Leicestershire, but in 1997 it was separated to become a unitary local authority, which is responsible for all local services apart from the police and fire service. It is mainly rural, but has two market towns, Oakham, the county town, and Uppingham. The county has an area of 151.5 square miles (392 square kilometres), and the 2011 census showed a population of 37,400.

In England, Sites of Special Scientific Interest (SSSIs) are designated by Natural England, a non-departmental public body which is responsible for protecting England's natural environment. Designation as an SSSI gives legal protection to the most important wildlife and geological sites. As of November 2017, there are 19 SSSIs in the county. Sixteen are designated for their biological importance, one for its geological importance and two under both criteria.

The largest site is Rutland Water at 1,555.3 hectares (3,843 acres), a Ramsar internationally important wetland site and a Special Protection Area under the European Union Directive on the Conservation of Wild Birds. The smallest is Tolethorpe Road Verges at 1.0 hectare (2.5 acres), which has several regionally uncommon plants on Jurassic limestone.

== Key ==
=== Interest ===
- B = a site of biological interest
- G = a site of geological interest

=== Public access ===
- NO = no public access to site
- PP = public access to part of site
- YES = public access to the whole or most of the site

=== Other classifications ===
- GCR = Geological Conservation Review
- LRWT = Leicestershire and Rutland Wildlife Trust
- NCR = Nature Conservation Review
- Ramsar = Ramsar site, an internationally important wetland site
- SPA = Special Protection Area under the European Union Directive on the Conservation of Wild Birds

== Sites ==
Site name	Photograph	B	G	Area (Note: The area and grid reference are taken from the "Details" page for each site on the Natural England database.)	Public access	Location	Other classifications	Map (Note: The maps are provided by Natural England on the Magic Map website.)	Citation (Note: Citations are provided for each site by Natural England.)	Description
Bloody Oaks Quarry	Bloody Oaks Quarry	✓		1.1 hectares (2.7 acres)	YES	Stamford; 52.686°N 0.564°W; SK 971 108	LRWT	Map	Citation	This site has species-rich grassland on Jurassic limestone. The dominant grasses are tor-grass and upright brome and flora include rock-rose, salad burnet, yellow-wort and autumn gentian.
Burley and Rushpit Woods	Burley Wood	✓		161.2 hectares (398 acres)	NO	Oakham; 52.679°N 0.684°W; SK 891 098		Map	Citation	These woods on upper Lias clay have many mature and over-mature trees and considerable dead wood. The dominant tree is oak in most of the forest, giving way to ash in the remainder. The lichens are of regional importance, and the invertebrates include one listed in the Red List of Threatened Species and five which are nationally scarce.
Clipsham Old Quarry and Pickworth Great Wood	Pickworth Great Wood	✓	✓	111.2 hectares (275 acres)	PP	Oakham; 52.723°N 0.549°W; SK 981 149	GCR	Map	Citation	Pickworth Great Wood is one of the largest deciduous woods in the county, with diverse breeding birds and over 150 species of moth. The quarry has dense hawthorn scrub and limestone grassland with a variety of lime loving herbs such as dwarf thistle and yellow-wort. It exposes rocks of the Lincolnshire Limestone, dating to the Bajocian stage in the Middle Jurassic around 170 million years ago.
East Wood, Great Casterton	East Wood, Great Casterton	✓		6.6 hectares (16 acres)		Great Casterton; 52.693°N 0.516°W; TF 004 116		Map	Citation	This semi-natural wood is on boulder clay of glacial origin. The dominant trees are ash, oak and wych elm, with a few wild service trees and small leaved limes. In well-drained areas there is a diverse ground flora typical of ancient woodland.
Empingham Marshy Meadows	Empingham Marshy Meadows	✓		14.0 hectares (35 acres)	YES	Oakham; 52.673°N 0.588°W; SK 956 093		Map	Citation	This site in the valley of North Brook has a complex geological structure and diverse habitats, including grassland and base-rich marsh and fen. Flora in wetter areas include adder's tongue fern, marsh marigold and ragged robin.
Eye Brook Reservoir	Eye Brook Reservoir	✓		201.3 hectares (497 acres)	NO	Uppingham; 52.551°N 0.745°W; SP 852 955		Map (Note: Eye Brook Reservoir is partly in Leicestershire.)	Citation	The reservoir is an important site for wintering wildfowl, such as wigeon, teal, mallard and pochard. Other habitats are marsh, mudflats, grassland, broad-leaved woodland and plantations.
Greetham Meadows	Greetham Meadows	✓		12.4 hectares (31 acres)	YES	Oakham; 52.731°N 0.612°W; SK 938 157	LRWT	Map	Citation	This ridge and furrow meadow is the only known location in the county for the frog orchid. The soil is on boulder clay, and grasses include crested dog's-tail, sweet vernal-grass, upright brome, downy oat-grass and quaking grass. There are several ponds.
Ketton Quarries	Ketton Quarries	✓	✓	115.6 hectares (286 acres)	PP	Stamford; 52.639°N 0.568°W; SK 970 055	GCR, LRWT	Map	Citation	The site provides an extensive exposure of the middle Jurassic Bathonian age, dating to around 167 million years ago. It is described by Natural England as "a critical site of considerable importance for lithostratigraphic and facies analysis in the Bathonian rocks of southern Britain". The older workings and spoil heaps are one of the largest areas of semi-natural limestone grassland and scrub in the county.
Luffenham Heath Golf Course	Luffenham Heath Golf Course	✓		75.1 hectares (186 acres)	NO	Stamford; 52.610°N 0.587°W; SK 958 023		Map	Citation	The course is located on several soil types, including calcareous grassland on Jurassic Lower Lincolnshire Limestone, together with acid heath, scrub and broad-leaved woodland. The dominant grasses are tor-grass and upright brome, and the site is notable for its butterflies and its diverse insect species.
Newell Wood	Newell Wood	✓		33.3 hectares (82 acres)	NO	Stamford; 52.718°N 0.517°W; TF 003 144		Map	Citation	This acid semi-natural woodland is mainly on glacial sands and gravels, but some areas are on clays and siltstones. It is dominated by oak and birch, and ground flora includes bracken, wood sorrel and early purple orchid.
North Luffenham Quarry	North Luffenham Quarry	✓		4.6 hectares (11 acres)	NO	Stamford; 52.622°N 0.582°W; SK 961 036		Map	Citation	This is calcareous grassland on thin soils derived from Jurassic Lincolnshire Limestone. Flora include basil thyme, marjoram and bee orchid. There are increasing areas of scrub, and the mixture of habitats has a diverse variety of insect species.
Prior's Coppice	Prior's Coppice	✓		27.4 hectares (68 acres)	YES	Oakham; 52.637°N 0.733°W; SK 831 051	LRWT	Map	Citation	This wood is on poorly drained soils derived from Jurassic Upper Lias clay and glacial boulder clay. The dominant trees are ash and oak, with field maple and hazel in the shrub layer. There is a diverse ground flora typical of ancient clay woods.
Rutland Water	Rutland Water	✓		1,555.3 hectares (3,843 acres)	YES	Oakham; 52.654°N 0.662°W; SK 906 071	LRWT, NCR, Ramsar, SPA	Map	Citation	This major wetland site has exceptional numbers and diversity of migrating and wintering waterfowl, such as goldeneyes, tufted ducks and wigeons. Habitats are lagoons, islands, mudflats, marsh, grassland, scrub and woodland.
Ryhall Pasture and Little Warren Verges	Ryhall Pasture	✓		6.2 hectares (15 acres)	PP	Stamford; 52.711°N 0.490°W; TF 021 137		Map (Note: Ryhall Pasture and Little Warren Verges is partly in Lincolnshire.)	Citation	The main grasses on Ryhall Pasture are tor-grass, upright brome and red fescue. The soil is on Jurassic Upper Lincolnshire Limestone, and the rich herb flora include clustered bellflower and greater knapweed.
Seaton Meadows	Seaton Meadows	✓		11.4 hectares (28 acres)	YES	Oakham; 52.571°N 0.651°W; SP 915 979	Plantlife	Map	Citation	This site is traditionally managed as hay pasture, and it is an example of unimproved alluvial flood meadows, a rare habitat due to agricultural developments. The grasses are diverse, including meadow foxtail, red fescue, sweet vernal grass and Yorkshire fog.
Shacklewell Hollow	Shacklewell Hollow	✓		3.2 hectares (7.9 acres)	NO	Oakham; 52.658°N 0.558°W; SK 976 077		Map	Citation	This marshy site is in the valley of a tributary of the River Gwash. The marsh is dominated by hard rush, and there are several artificial ponds with large populations of mare's tail. There are also areas of calcareous grassland and alder wood.
Tickencote Marsh	Tickencote Marsh	✓		3.0 hectares (7.4 acres)	NO	Stamford; 52.671°N 0.549°W; SK 982 091		Map	Citation	This site in the valley of the River Gwash is a base-rich grazing marsh, a habitat which is becoming increasingly rare as a result of drainage and a decline in grazing. Common flora include lesser pond-sedge, marsh horsetail and jointed rush.
Tolethorpe Road Verges	Tolethorpe Road Verges	✓		1.0 hectare (2.5 acres)	YES	Stamford; 52.682°N 0.504°W; TF 012 104		Map	Citation	These grass road verges on Jurassic limestone have several regionally uncommon plants. They are dominated by tor-grass and upright brome, and there are calcareous grassland herbs such as spiny restharrow and stemless thistle.
Wing Water Treatment Works	:Wing Water Treatment Works		✓	1.5 hectares (3.7 acres)	YES	Oakham; 52.614°N 0.676°W; SK 898 026	GCR	Map	Citation	This site is stratigraphically important both regionally and nationally, as it has the longest sequence known in Britain of deposits from the warm Ipswichian interglacial around 120,000 years ago, and it has yielded new paleobotanical records for this period.

== See also ==
- Leicestershire and Rutland Wildlife Trust
