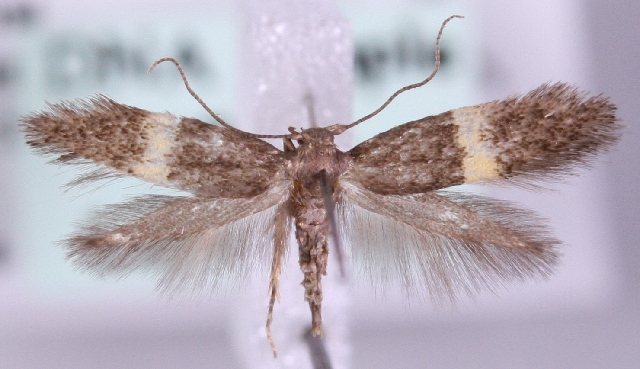

Scientific classification
- Domain: Eukaryota
- Kingdom: Animalia
- Phylum: Arthropoda
- Class: Insecta
- Order: Lepidoptera
- Family: Elachistidae
- Genus: Elachista
- Species: E. gangabella

Binomial name
- Elachista gangabella Zeller, 1850

Synonyms
- Elachista taeniatella Stainton, 1857

= Elachista gangabella =

Species of moth

Elachista gangabella is a moth of the family Elachistidae. It is found in all of Europe, except the Iberian Peninsula.

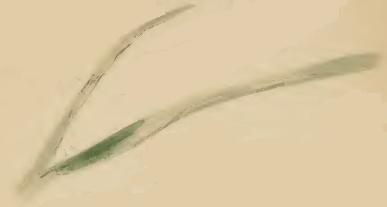
Two mined leaves of Dactylis glomerata

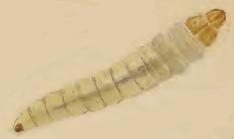
Larva

The wingspan is 9–10 millimetres (0.35–0.39 in). The head is blackish-grey. Forewings are blackish; a straight somewhat inwardly oblique central whitish-yellowish fascia, in male narrowed towards costa; tips of apical cilia whitish. Hindwings are dark grey. The larva is grey-green, yellowish-tinged; head yellow-brown; 2 with two pale brown spots.

Adults are on wing from March to June.

The larvae feed on tor-grass (Brachypodium pinnatum), false-brome (Brachypodium sylvaticum), cock's-foot (Dactylis glomerata) and mountain melick (Melica nutans). They mine the leaves of their host plant. Larvae can be found from September to November.
