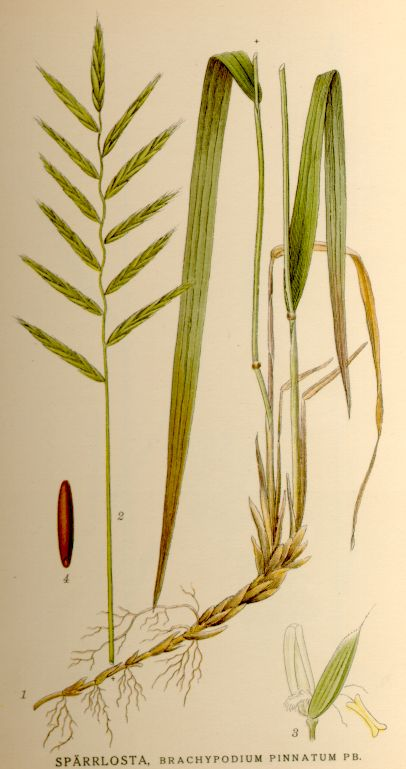
- Brachypodium pinnatum

Scientific classification
- Kingdom: Plantae
- Clade: Tracheophytes
- Clade: Angiosperms
- Clade: Monocots
- Clade: Commelinids
- Order: Poales
- Family: Poaceae
- Clade: BOP clade
- Subfamily: Pooideae
- Tribe: Brachypodieae; Harz (1880)
- Genus: Brachypodium; P.Beauv. 1812 not Brid. 1826 (a bryophyte)

Type species
- Brachypodium pinnatum (L.) P.Beauv.

Synonyms
- Disticheia Ehrh.; Trachynia Link; Brevipodium Á.Löve & D.Löve

= Brachypodium =

Genus of grasses

Brachypodium (short foot) is a genus of plants in the grass family, widespread across much of Africa, Eurasia, and Latin America. The genus is classified in its own tribe Brachypodieae.

Flimsy upright stems form tussocks. Flowers appear in compact spike-like racemes with 5-25 flowers on each short-stalked spikelet in summer. Leaves are flat or curved.

According to a study published in 2010, there is evidence of Brachypodium and cattail (Typha spp.) residues occurring on prehistoric human grinding tools dated 28,000 years ago from Bilancino in central Italy. Another contemporaneously published study stated that the grain residues resemble Brachypodium, based on a comparison to two modern specimens: "Among these, the grains, which are slightly angular, with hardly visible centric, point-shaped hila and adequate dimensions (in the sample measuring 9–14 μm), appeared very similar to those of Brachypodium or related genera."

Species

- Brachypodium × ambrosii - Spain
- Brachypodium × apollinaris - Spain
- Brachypodium arbusculum - Canary Islands
- Brachypodium bolusii - Lesotho, South Africa
- Brachypodium × cugnacii - Denmark, Ireland, France, Czech Republic
- Brachypodium × diazii - Spain
- Brachypodium distachyon - Mediterranean, Sahara, Sahel, southwest Asia from Portugal + Cape Verde to Sudan + Ukraine + Tibet
- Brachypodium firmifolium - Cyprus
- Brachypodium flexum - Africa from Sierra Leone to KwaZulu-Natal + Madagascar
- Brachypodium humbertianum - Madagascar
- Brachypodium kawakamii - Taiwan
- Brachypodium kotschyi - Turkey
- Brachypodium madagascariense - Madagascar
- Brachypodium mexicanum - Mexico, Central America, Venezuela, Colombia, Ecuador, Peru, Bolivia
- Brachypodium perrieri - Madagascar
- Brachypodium phoenicoides - Mediterranean from Portugal + Morocco to Greece
- Brachypodium pinnatum - Africa + Eurasia from Ireland + Morocco to China + Yakutia
- Brachypodium pringlei - Mexico (Nuevo León, Tamaulipas, Coahuila)
- Brachypodium retusum - Mediterranean + nearby areas from Portugal + Morocco to Ethiopia + Caucasus
- Brachypodium sylvaticum - Africa + Eurasia from Ireland + Morocco to Korea + New Guinea

Formerly included

numerous species once considered members of Brachypodium but now considered better suited to other genera: Agropyron Anthosachne Arundinella Brachyelytrum Brachysteleum Catapodium Cutandia Distichlis Elymus Festuca Festucopsis Lolium Micropyrum Poa Ptychomitrium Rostraria Triticum Vulpia

== See also ==
- List of Poaceae genera
