= Tolethorpe Road Verges =

Protected area in Rutland, England

Coordinates: 52.682°N 0.504°W

- Site of Special Scientific Interest
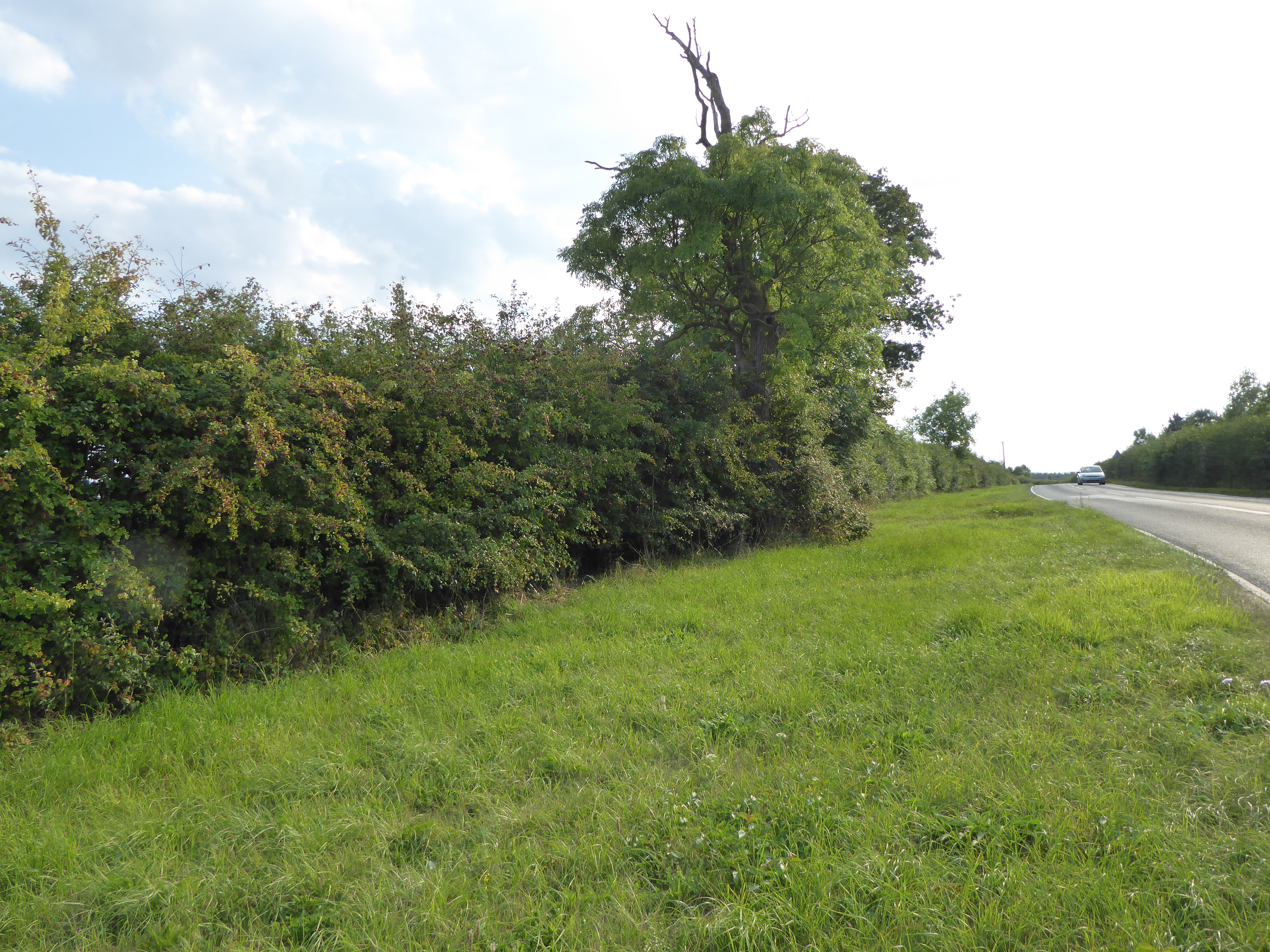
- Location of Tolethorpe Road Verges.
- Area of search: Rutland
- Grid reference: TF 012 104
- Interest: Biological
- Area: 1.0 hectares
- Notification date: 1987
- Location map: Magic Map

Tolethorpe Road Verges is a one hectare biological Site of Special Scientific Interest along the verges of Ryall Road between Great Casterton and Ryhall in Rutland.

These grass road verges on Jurassic limestone have several regionally uncommon plants. They are dominated by tor-grass and upright brome, and there are calcareous grassland herbs such as spiny restharrow and stemless thistle.
