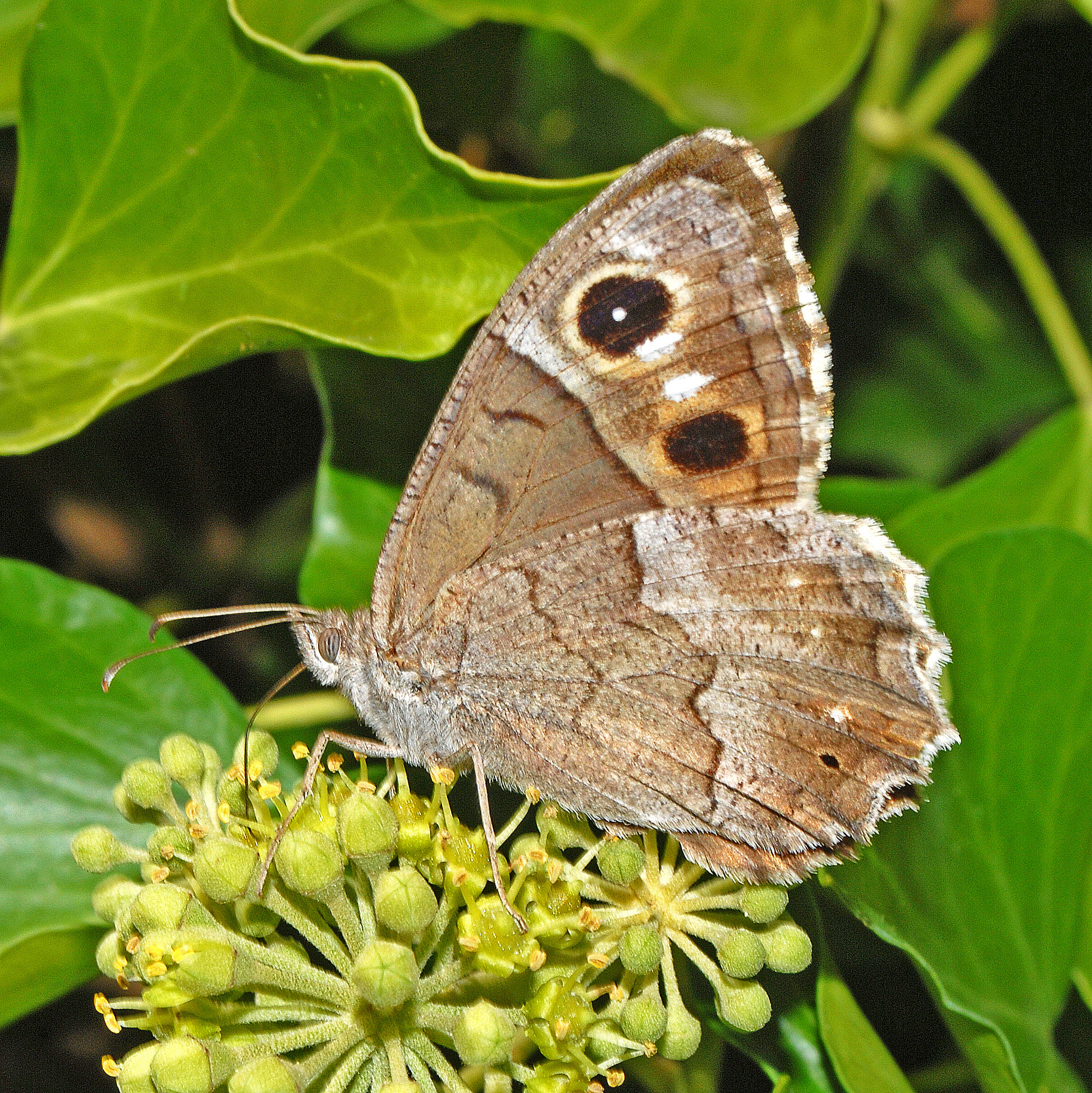
- Hipparchia statilinus. Male, side view

Conservation status
- Least Concern (IUCN 3.1)

Scientific classification
- Kingdom: Animalia
- Phylum: Arthropoda
- Class: Insecta
- Order: Lepidoptera
- Family: Nymphalidae
- Genus: Hipparchia
- Species: H. statilinus

Binomial name
- Hipparchia statilinus Hufnagel, 1766
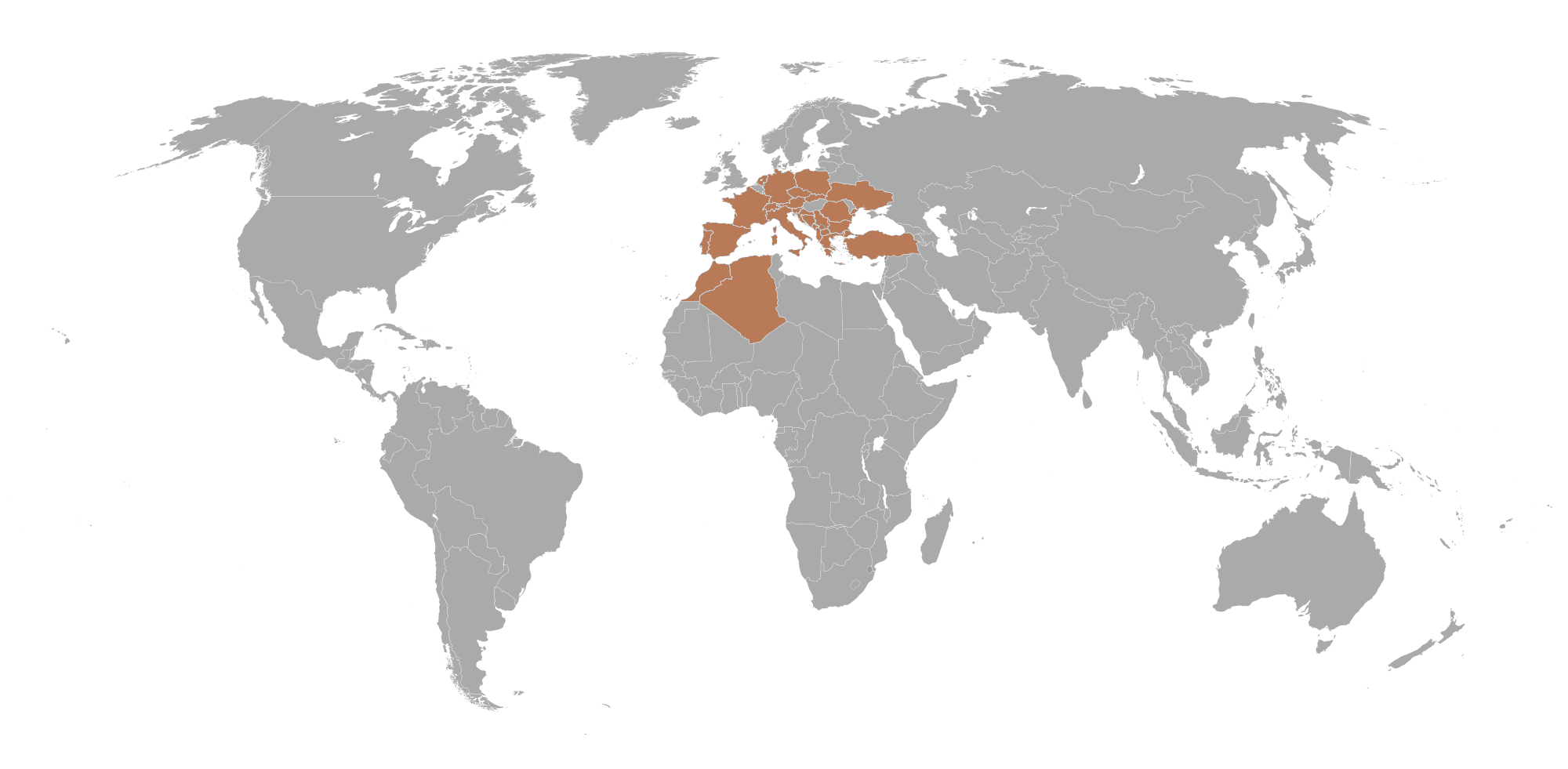
- Hipparchia statilinus distribution

Synonyms
- Neohipparchia statilinus (Hufnagel, 1766)

= Hipparchia statilinus =

Species of butterfly

Hipparchia statilinus, the tree grayling, is a butterfly of the family Nymphalidae.

== Subspecies ==
Subspecies include:

- Hipparchia statilinus statilinus (Hufnagel, 1766)
- Hipparchia statilinus sylvicola (Austaut, 1880) (Morocco, Algeria and Tunisia)

== Distribution ==
The species can be found in Central Europe, Southern Europe, North Africa, Anatolia and the Caucasus.

== Habitat ==
This butterfly can be found in dry, rocky, grassy and bushy areas at an elevation of 0–1,400 metres (0–4,593 ft) above sea level.

== Description ==
Hipparchia statilinus has a wingspan of 60–68 millimetres (2.4–2.7 in). These butterflies are rather variable, especially in the shades of brown present on the wings and in the intensity of the white bands. Usually the basic color of the upperside of the wings is dull brown in the male, lighter or ocher in the female, with a fringe on the edges. Two blind or very discreetly pupillated black eyespots are present on the forewings, while the hindwings show a very small eyespot.

The underside is marbled with ocher and dusty white bands. On the underside of each forewing there are two black eyespots ringed in yellow, the upper one with a white central spot. Between the two black eyespots there are two white spots. On the underside of the hindwings there may be a black spot near the posterior and anal margin. The caterpillars are greenish-beige with green-brownish longitudinal stripes.

== Biology ==
Hipparchia statilinus is a univoltine species. The larvae feed on various common grasses of the family Poaceae (Brachypodium phoenicoides, Brachypodium retusum, Bromus erectus, Bromus sterilis, Corynephorus canescens, Dactylis glomerata, Festuca ovina, Koeleria vallesiana, Lolium rigidum, Nardus stricta, Poa annua, Stipa gigantea, Stipa parviflora, Stipa pennata, Oryzopsis canadensis, Deschampsia cespitosa, Anisantha sterilis) and of family Cyperaceae (Carex species). Adults fly from June to October, and can be found resting on rocky ground with closed wings, warming up.

== Gallery ==
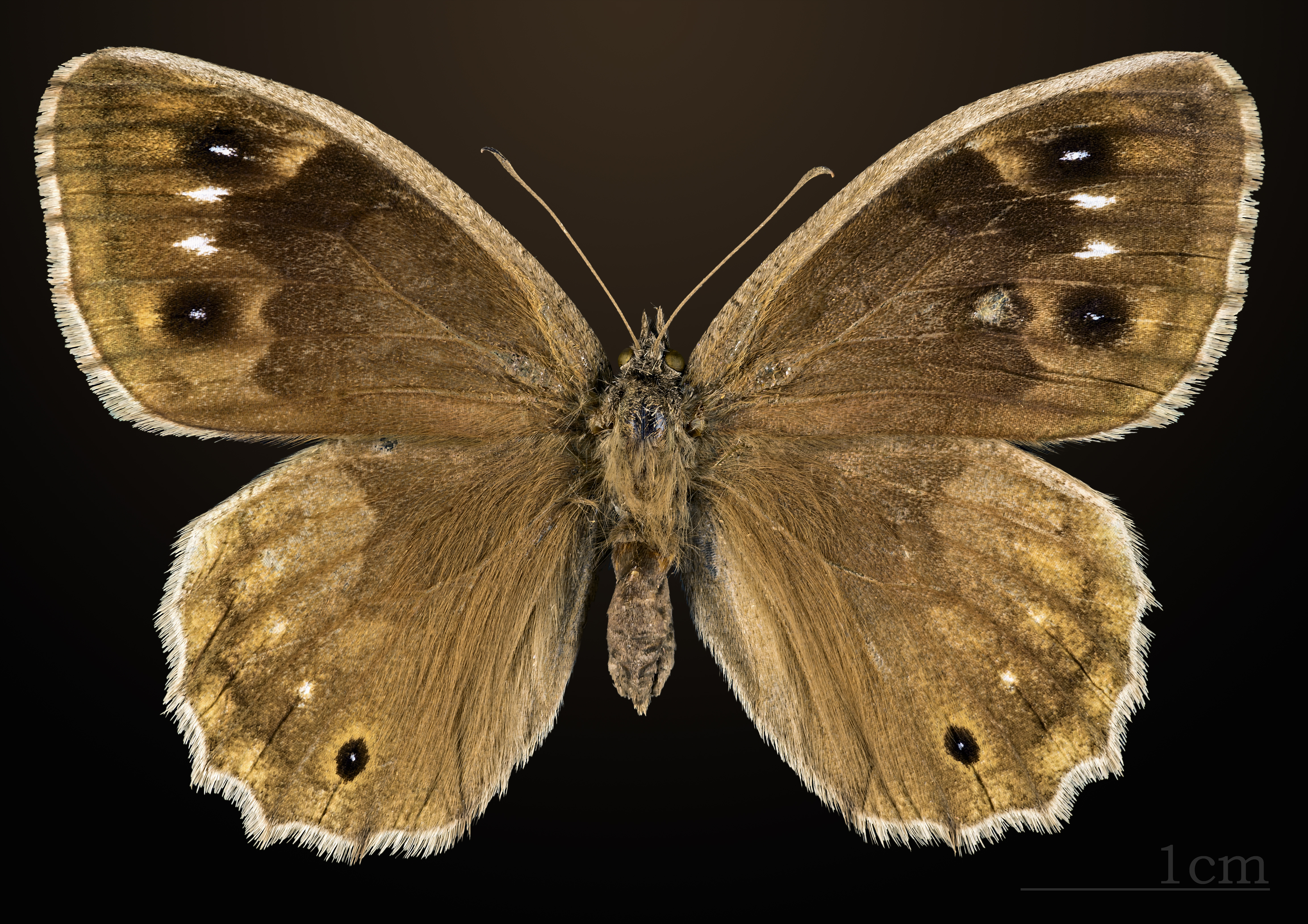
Female

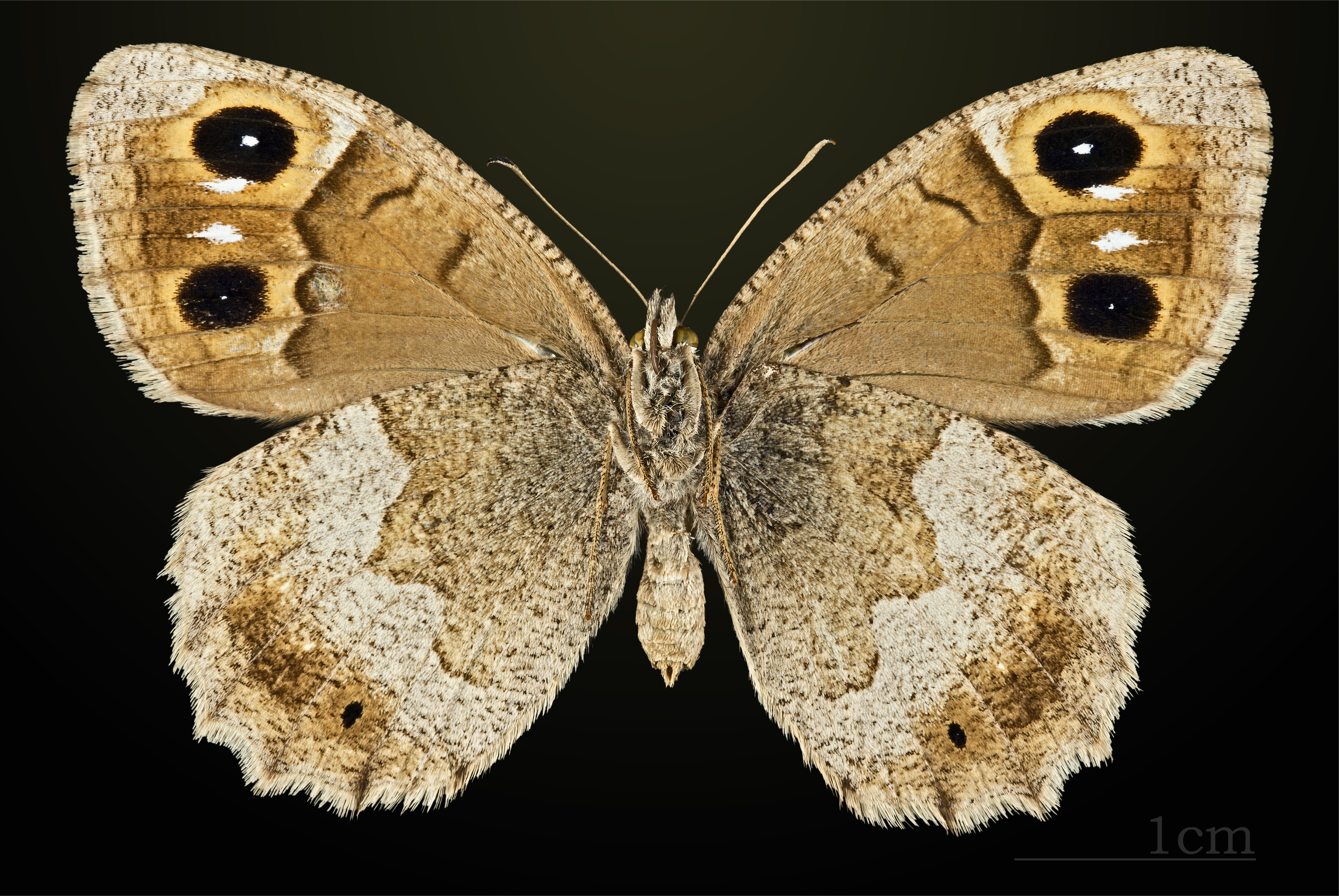
Female underside

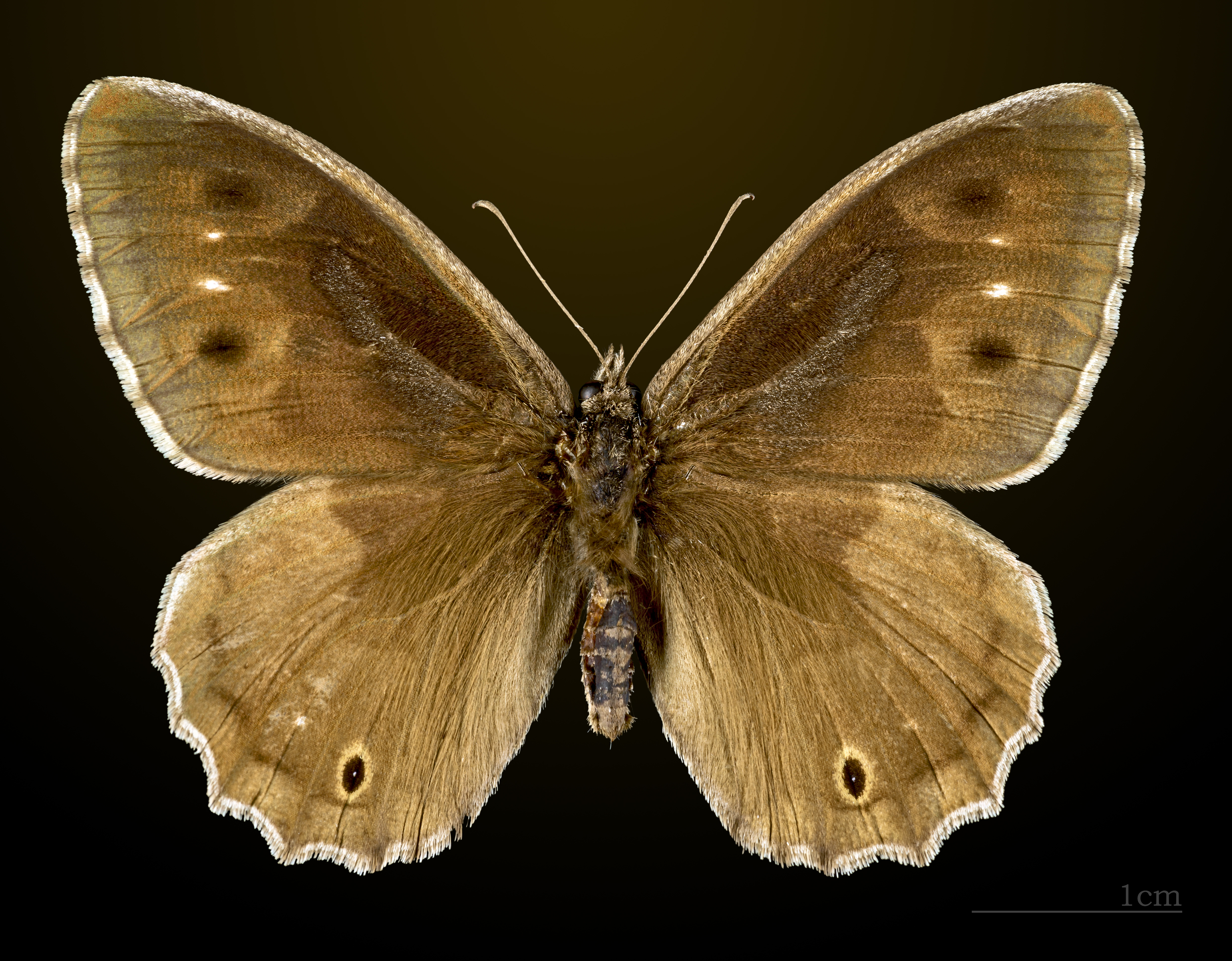
Male

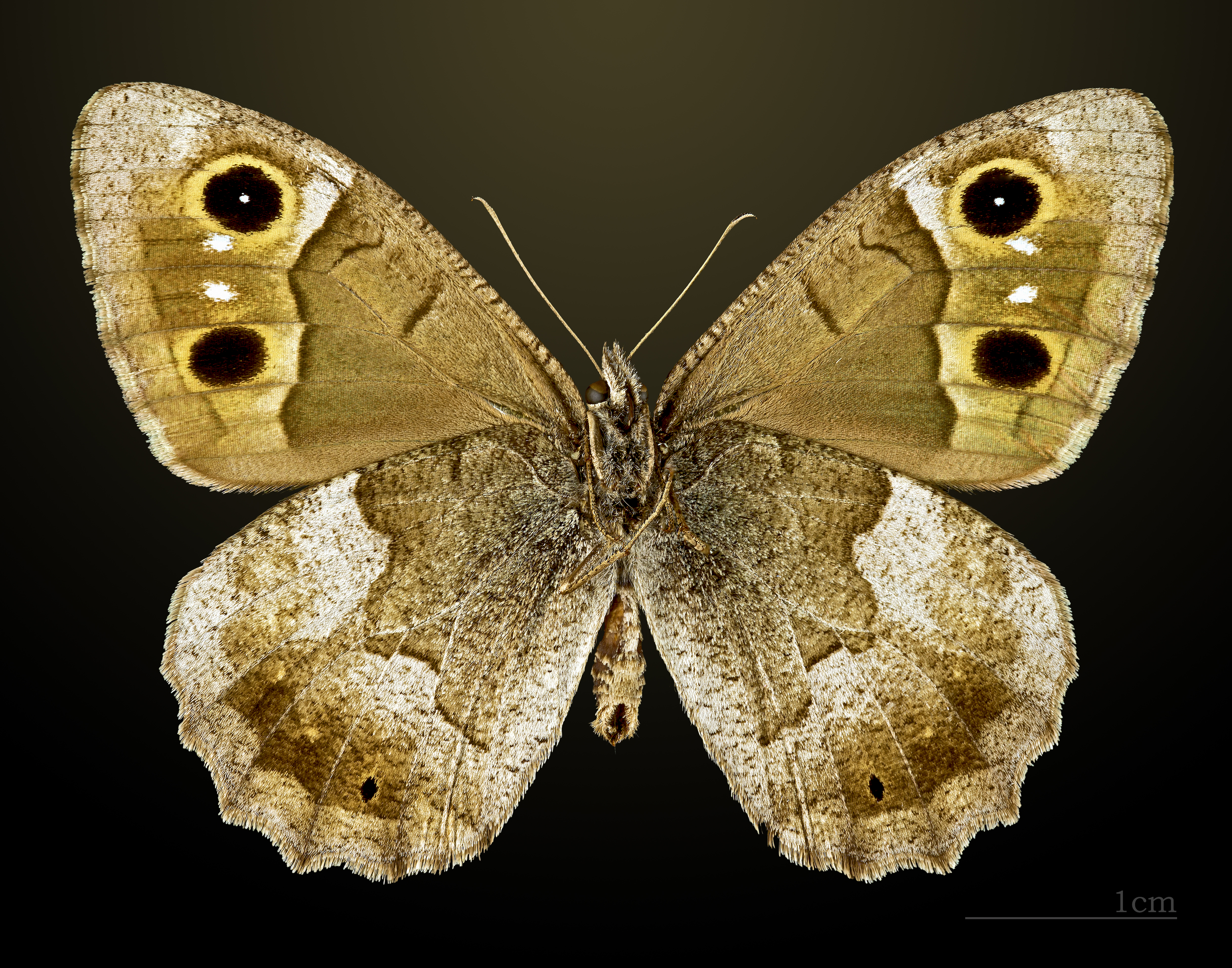
Male underside
