= St Peter's Church, Empingham =

Church in Empingham, Rutland

Coordinates: 52°39′56″N 0°35′45″W

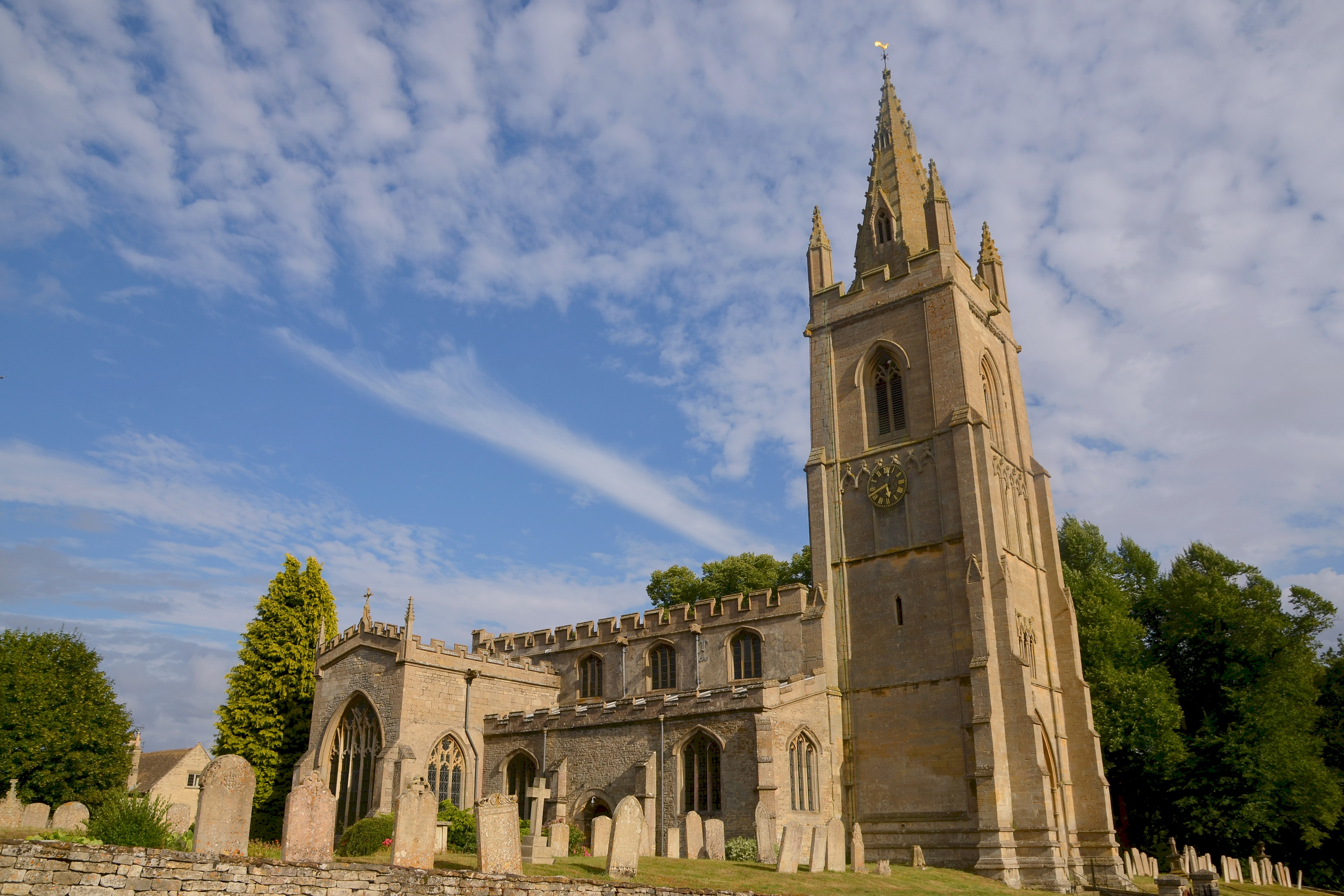
- Denomination: Church of England

History
- Dedication: St Peter

Administration
- Diocese: Peterborough
- Parish: Empingham, Rutland

St Peter's Church is a church in Empingham, Rutland. It is a Grade I listed building.

== History ==
The church was mostly built in the 13th century but there has certainly been a church here since the Norman era. The southern arcade, dating back to the early 13th century, is the oldest part of the current church. The chancel also dates from the 13th century and has a double piscina and a triple sedilia. The northern aisle was built in the 14th century. The piscinas indicate where the altars were around the church.

In the 15th century the clerestory was added and the roof was raised. The figures carved on the roof were added at this time.

A slightly painted over, medieval wall painting depicting the Virgin Mary, is situated on the southern wall.

The northern transept has some stone grave slabs as well as a painting showing the faces of St Joachim and St Anne.
