= North Brook, Rutland =

River in the county of Rutland, England

North Brook
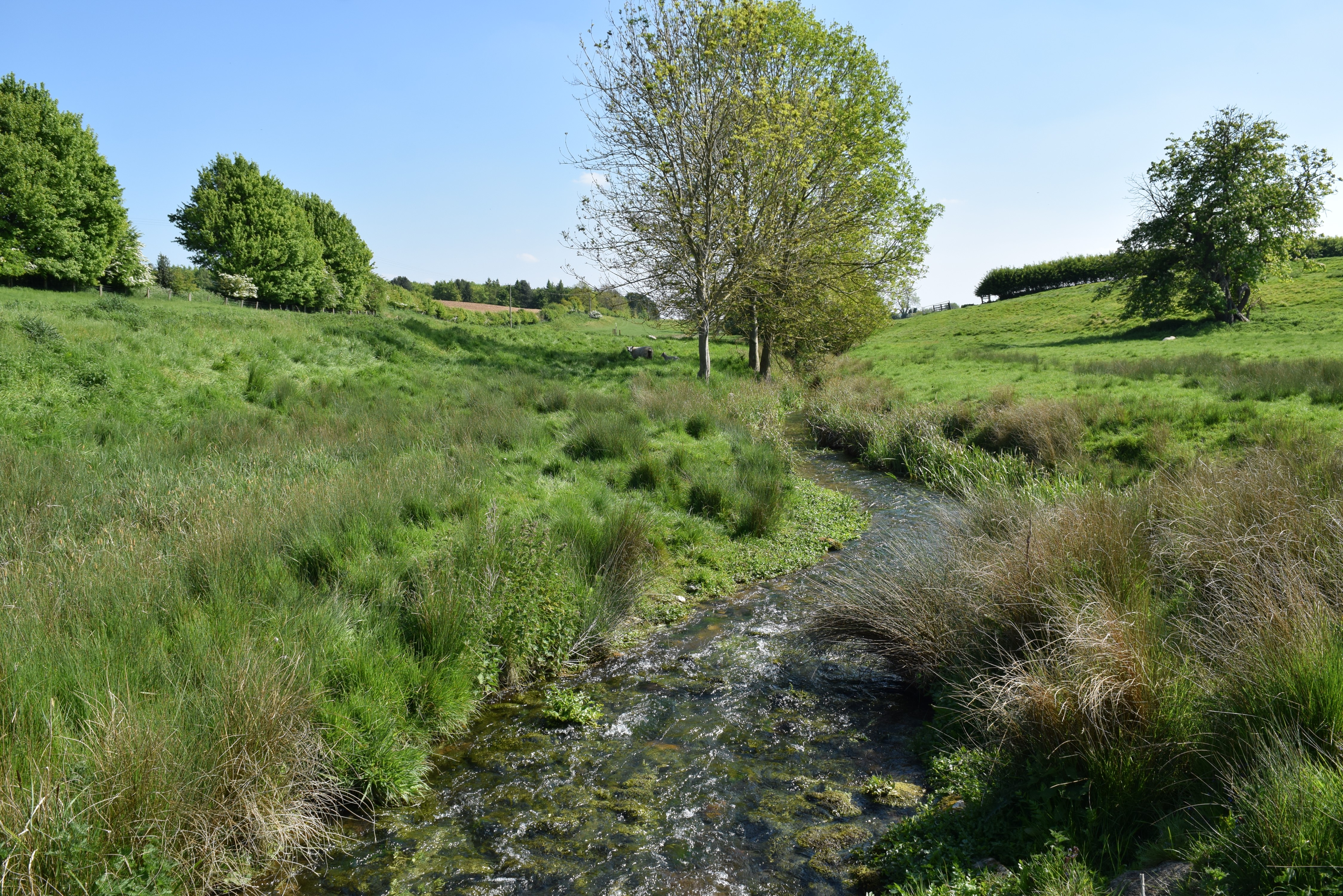
- The North Brook downstream of the Lower Lake at Exton Hall

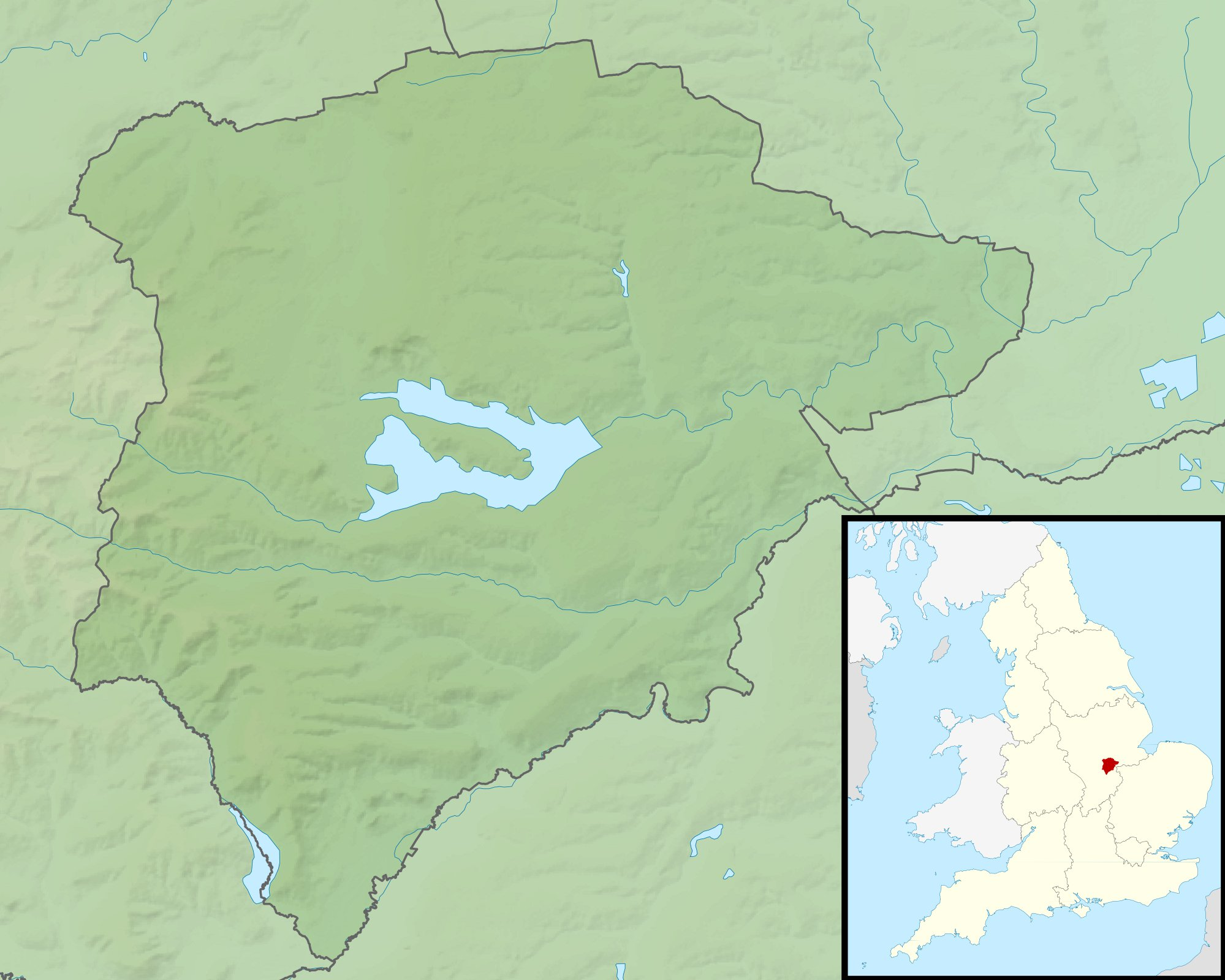
- Location of the river mouth in Rutland

Location
- Country: England
- County: Rutland

Physical characteristics
- Source
  - location: Cottesmore, Rutland
  - coordinates: 52°42′56″N 0°39′27″W
  - elevation: 132 m (433 ft)
- Mouth: River Gwash
  - location: Empingham, Rutland
  - coordinates: 52°39′53″N 0°35′10″W
  - elevation: 57 m (187 ft)
- Basin size: 36.3 km^{2} (14.0 sq mi)

Basin features
- River system: River Welland

The North Brook is a small watercourse in Rutland in the East Midlands of England. It is a tributary of the River Gwash and part of the River Welland catchment.

== Course ==
The North Brook rises near Cottesmore and flows in an easterly direction through Greetham before turning southwards past the site of the former Greetham Mill. It then flows through a deep gully and into the parkland of Exton Hall where it has been dammed to create two ornamental lakes. On the western side of the upper lake stands Fort Henry, a pleasure-house built in 1788 in the elegant Gothick style. After the lower of the two lakes it passes to the west of the deserted medieval village of Horn, before flowing under the remains of the Exton Park wall.

Shortly afterwards, it is joined by a small unnamed tributary which flows through Ry Gate Lake in the grounds of Exton Hall, and later through the bed of a drained lake near Cuckoo Spinney. The North Brook continues in a southerly direction by Horn Mill, now a trout hatchery, through Empingham Marshy Meadows SSSI to Empingham where it joins the River Gwash near the site of the former Empingham Mill.
