= Brachypodium firmifolium =

Scientific classification
- Kingdom: Plantae
- Clade: Tracheophytes
- Clade: Angiosperms
- Clade: Monocots
- Clade: Commelinids
- Order: Poales
- Family: Poaceae
- Subfamily: Pooideae
- Genus: Brachypodium
- Species: B. firmifolium

Binomial name
- Brachypodium firmifolium H.Lindb.

Species of grass

Brachypodium firmifolium is a yellowish or glaucous-green perennial grass with slender erect or decumbent culms up to 45 cm high. Flowering: June–July.

== Habitat ==
Igneous mountainsides, usually in damp shaded grounds by streams and cataracts, sometimes in open forest or meadows at 1000–1700 m altitude.

== Distribution ==
Endemic to Cyprus, locally common in the Troödos area.

== External links and further reading ==
- "Brachypodium firmifolium H.Lindb. — The Plant List". theplantlist.org.
- Scholz, Hildemar (2007). "On the Identity of Brachypodium firmifolium (Poaceae) from Cyprus". Willdenowia. 37 (1): 215–220. doi:10.3372/wi.37.37111. JSTOR 20371341.
- "Brachypodium firmifolium H.Lindb". e-monocot.org. Archived from the original on 2014-08-26.
