= Empingham Marshy Meadows =

Biological site in Rutland, England

Coordinates: 52.673°N 0.588°W

- Site of Special Scientific Interest
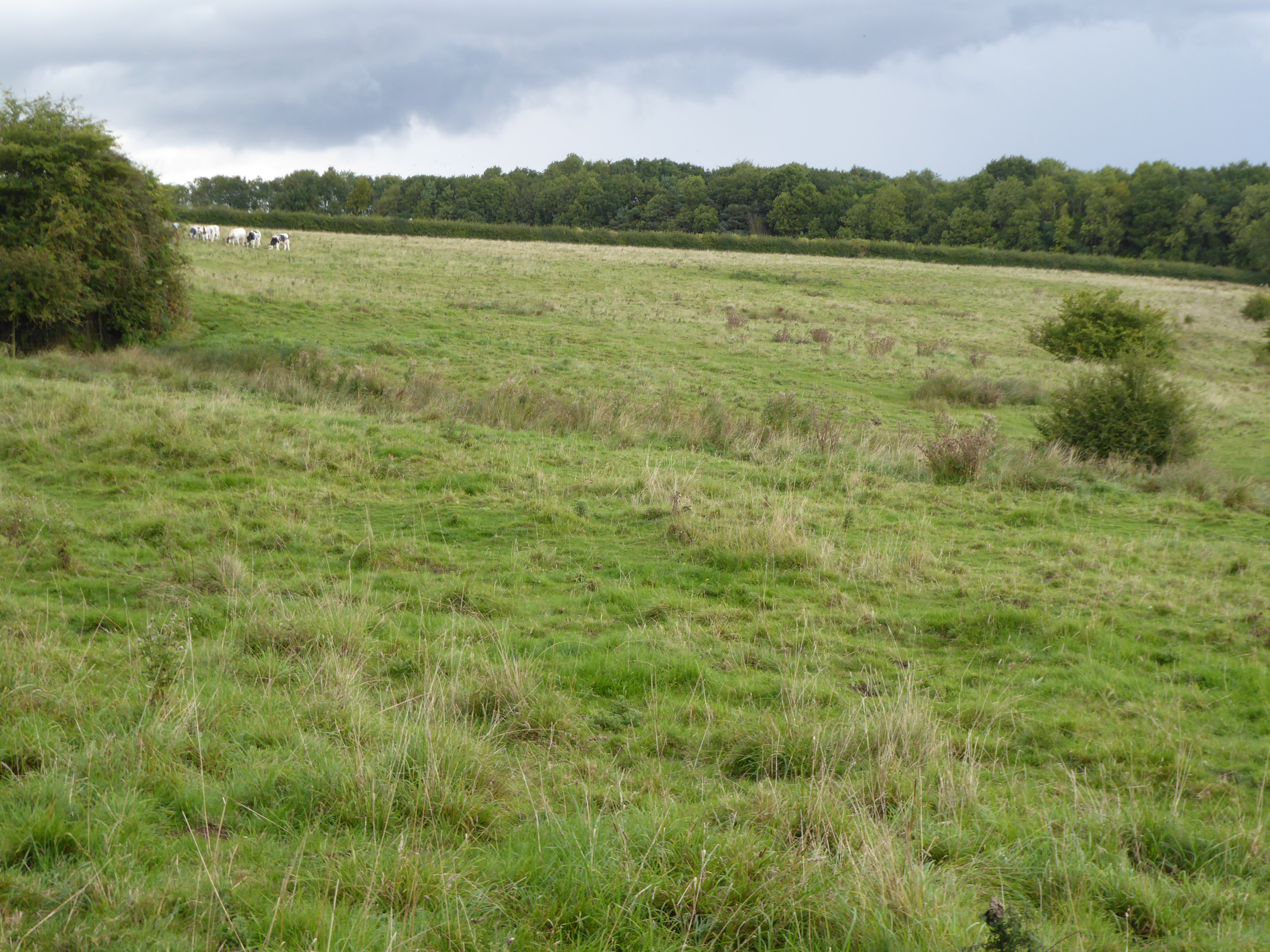
- Location of Empingham Marshy Meadows.
- Area of search: Rutland
- Grid reference: SK 956 093
- Interest: Biological
- Area: 14.0 hectares
- Notification date: 1983
- Location map: Magic Map

Empingham Marshy Meadows is a 14 hectare biological Site of Special Scientific Interest north of Empingham in Rutland.

This site in the valley of the North Brook has a complex geological structure and diverse habitats, including grassland and base-rich marsh and fen. Flora in wetter areas include adder's tongue fern, marsh marigold and ragged robin.

Public footpaths from Empingham go through the meadows.

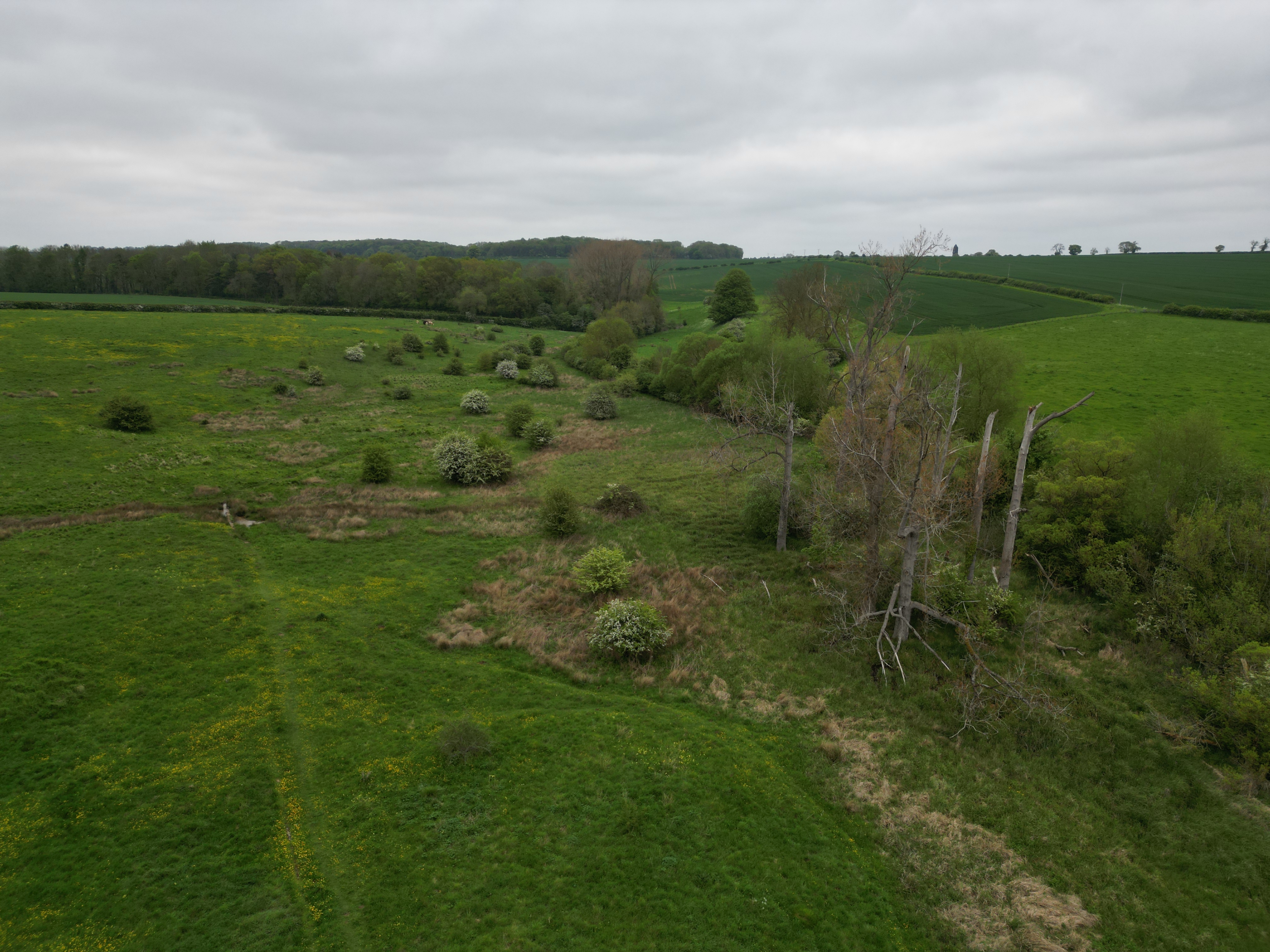
