= Empingham =

Medium sized village in Rutland, England

Coordinates: 52.666389°N 0.596389°W

- Village
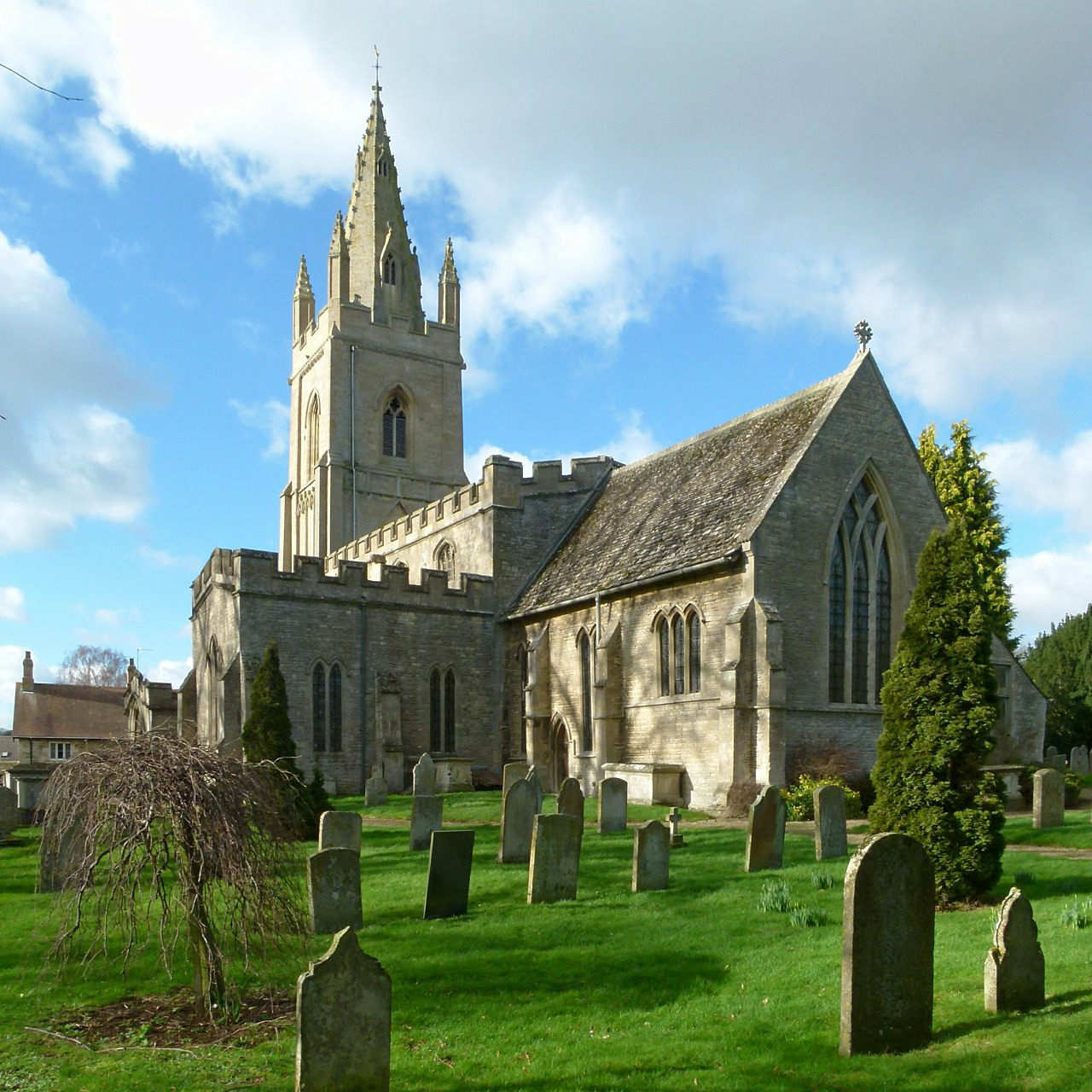
- St Peter’s Church

- Location within Rutland
- Area: 7.62 sq mi (19.7 km^{2})
- Population: 815 (2001 Census)
  - Density: 107/sq mi (41/km^{2})
- OS grid reference: SK949085
  - London: 83 miles (134 km) SSE
- Unitary authority: Rutland
- Ceremonial county: Rutland
- Region: East Midlands
- Country: England
- Sovereign state: United Kingdom
- Post town: OAKHAM
- Postcode district: LE15
- Dialling code: 01780
- Police: Leicestershire
- Fire: Leicestershire
- Ambulance: East Midlands
- UK Parliament: Rutland and Stamford

Empingham is a village in the county of Rutland in the East Midlands of England. The population of the civil parish was 815 at the 2001 census including Horn and increasing to 880 at the 2011 census. It lies close to the dam of Rutland Water and the A606 runs through the village. During construction, Empingham Reservoir was the name of the reservoir but it was renamed Rutland Water to preserve the name of the county which was being merged with Leicestershire.

The village's name means 'farm/settlement of the people of Empa'.

The Church of St Peter was a Peculiar of the see of Lincoln. When the diocese of Peterborough was created, this church remained tied to Lincoln Cathedral and the title of a prebend there.

To the north east on the Great North Road (now A1) the Battle of Empingham was fought in 1470 as part of the Wars of the Roses. The battle is also known as Battle of Losecoat Field (or Losecote Field), supposedly because the defeated Lancastrians, when fleeing, threw off the distinguishing clothing. However the name probably predates the battle and means pigsty field. Forms of Losecote also appear as field names in other parishes in Rutland. Contemporary accounts refer to the battle site as Hornfield. An adjacent woodland is now called Bloody Oaks.

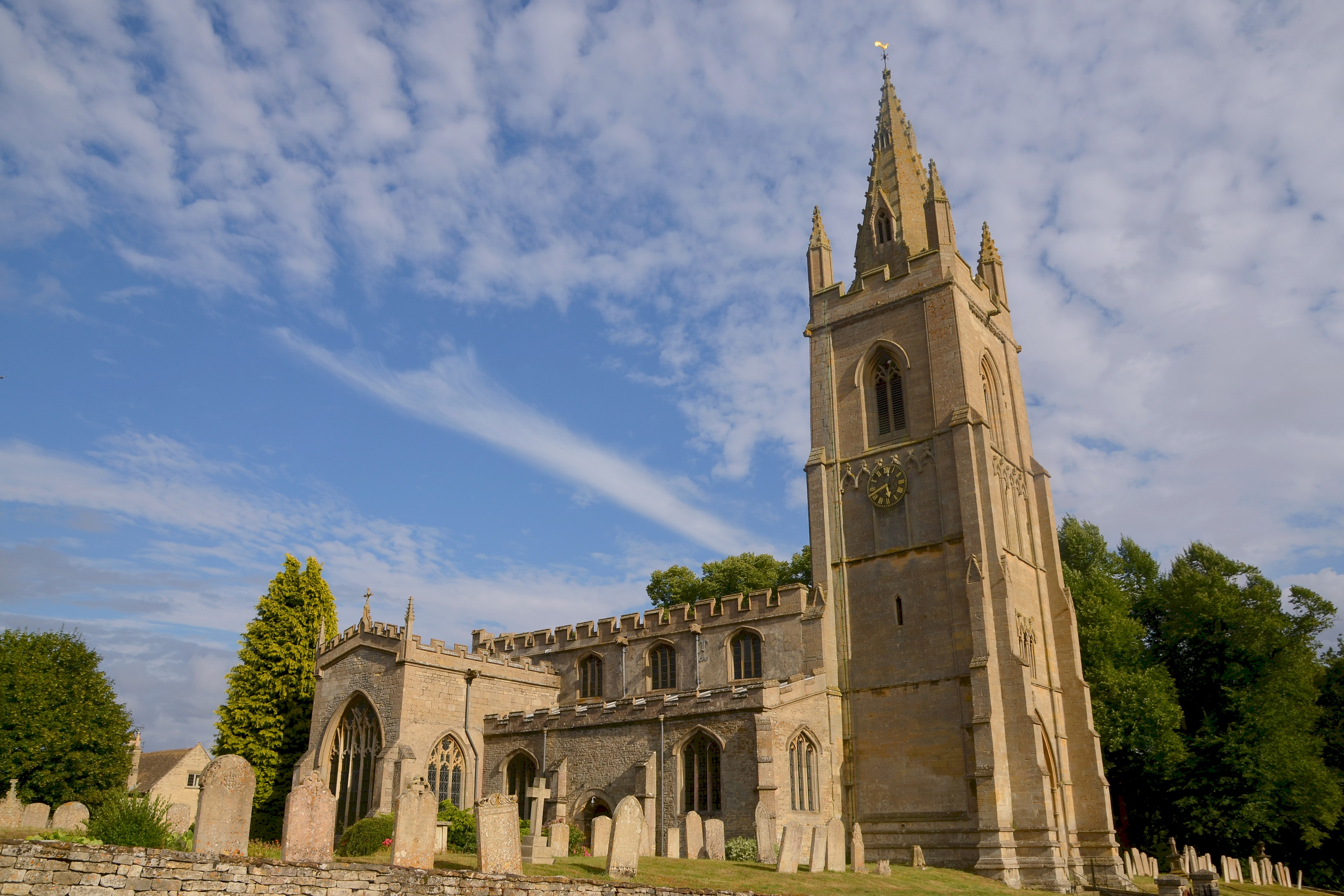
St Peter's Church, Empingham

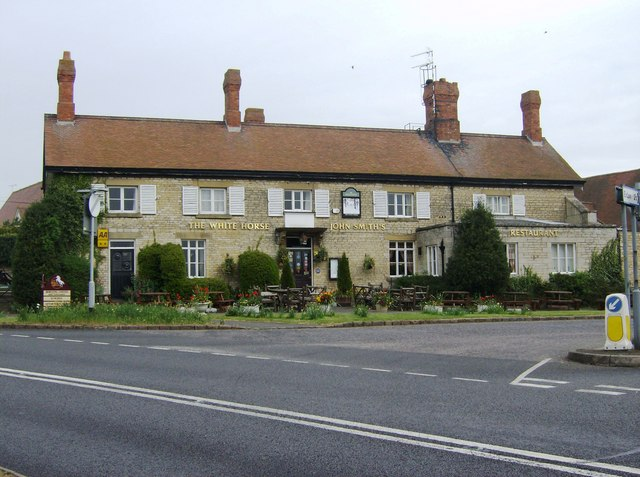
The White Horse
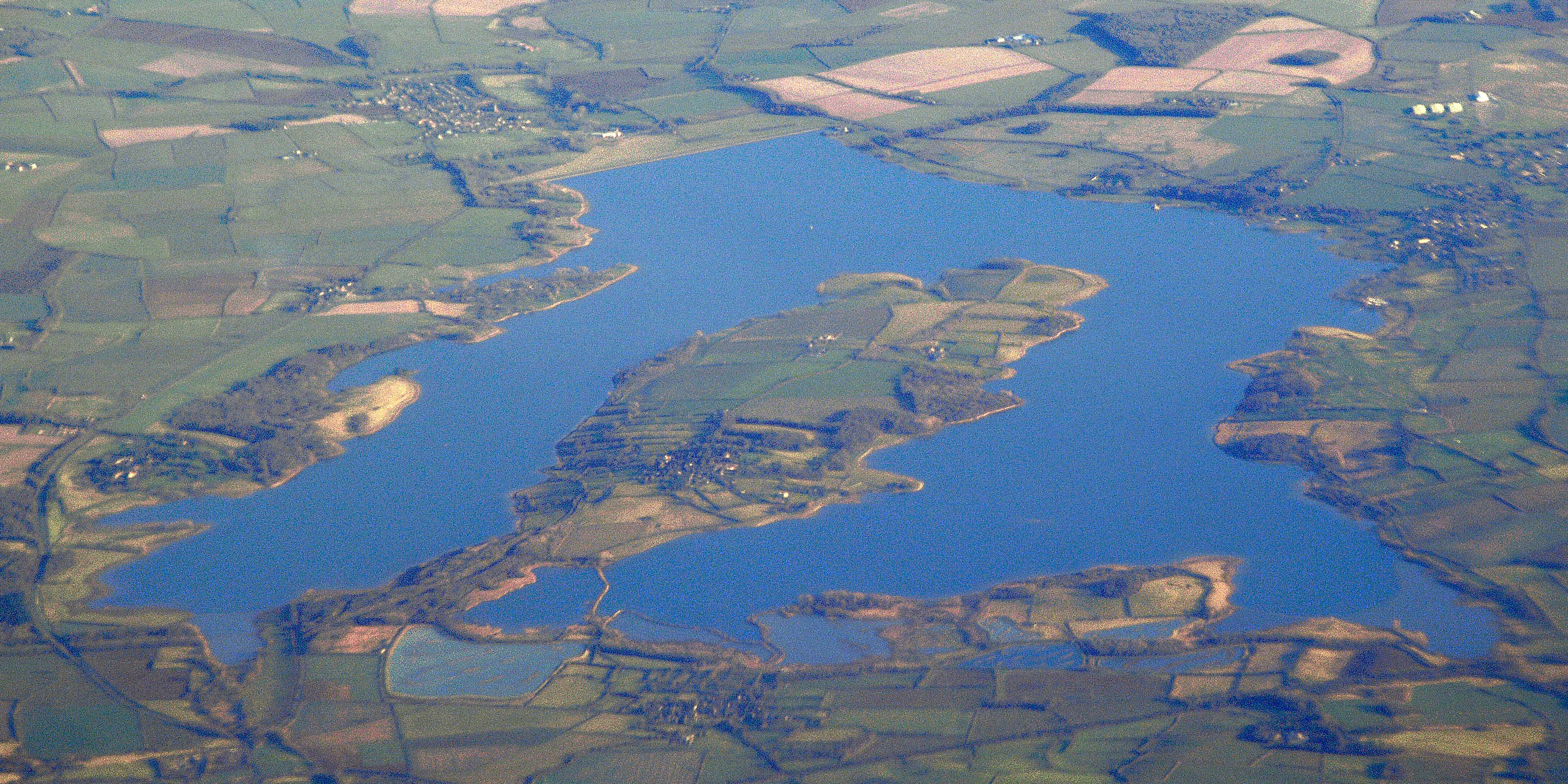
Aerial view of Rutland Water with Empingham and its dam at the top at centre left

== See also ==
- Empingham Marshy Meadows SSSI
- Shacklewell Hollow SSI
