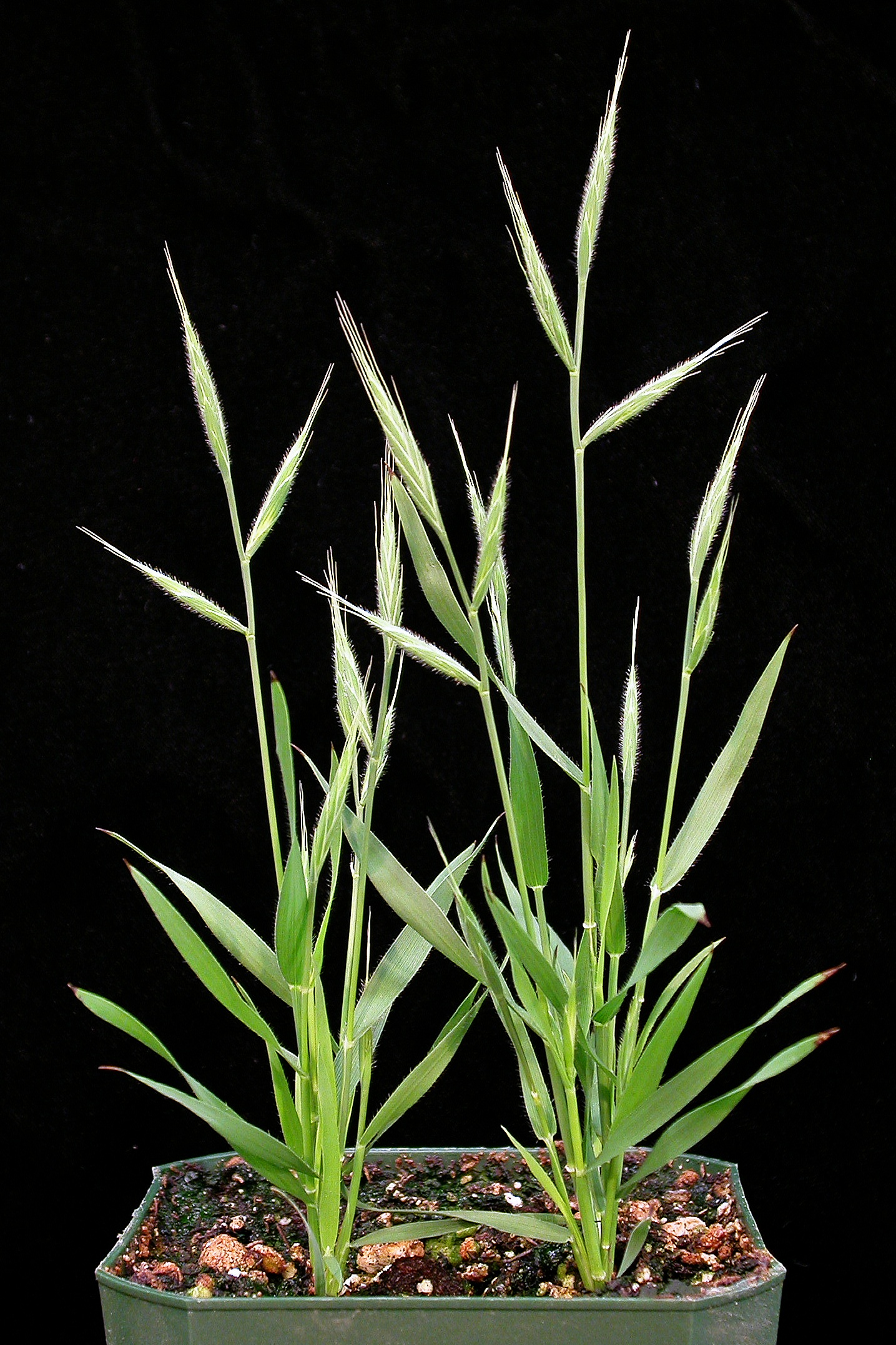

Scientific classification
- Kingdom: Plantae
- Clade: Tracheophytes
- Clade: Angiosperms
- Clade: Monocots
- Clade: Commelinids
- Order: Poales
- Family: Poaceae
- Subfamily: Pooideae
- Genus: Brachypodium
- Species: B. distachyon

Binomial name
- Brachypodium distachyon (L.) P.Beauv.

= Brachypodium distachyon =

Species of grass

Brachypodium distachyon, commonly called purple false brome or stiff brome, is a grass species native to southern Europe, northern Africa and southwestern Asia east to India. It is related to the major cereal grain species wheat, barley, oats, maize, rice, rye, sorghum, and millet. It has many qualities that make it an excellent model organism for functional genomics research in temperate grasses, cereals, and dedicated biofuel crops such as switchgrass. These attributes include small genome (~270 Mbp) diploid accessions, a series of polyploid accessions, a small physical stature, self-fertility, a short lifecycle, simple growth requirements, and an efficient transformation system. The genome of Brachypodium distachyon (diploid inbred line Bd21) has been sequenced and published in Nature in 2010.

== Model organism ==
Although B. distachyon has little or no direct agricultural significance, it has several advantages as an experimental model organism for understanding the genetic, cellular and molecular biology of temperate grasses. The relatively small size of its genome makes it useful for genetic mapping and sequencing. In addition, only ~21% of the Brachypodium genome consists of repetitive elements, compared to 26% in rice and ~80% in wheat, further simplifying genetic mapping and sequencing. At about 272 million base pairs and with five chromosomes, it has a small genome for a grass species. B. distachyon's small size (15–20 cm) and rapid life cycle (eight to twelve weeks) are also advantageous for research purposes. For early-flowering accessions it can take as little as three weeks from germination to flower (under an appropriate inductive photoperiod). The small size of some accessions makes it convenient for cultivation in a small space. As a weed it grows easily without specialized growing conditions.

B. distachyon is emerging as a powerful model with a growing research community. The International Brachypodium Initiative (IBI) held its first genomics meeting and workshop at the PAG XIV conference in San Diego, California, in January 2006. The goal of the IBI is to promote the development of B. distachyon as a model system and will develop and distribute genomic, genetic, and bioinformatics resources such as reference genotypes, BAC libraries, genetic markers, mapping populations, and a genome sequence database. Recently, efficient Agrobacterium-mediated transformation systems have been developed for a range of Brachypodium genotypes, enabling the development of T-DNA mutant collections. The characterization and distribution of T-DNA insertion lines has been initiated to facilitate the understanding of gene function in grasses.

By now, B. distachyon has established itself as an important tool for comparative genomics. It is now emerging as a model for crop plant disease, facilitating the model-to-crop transfer of knowledge on disease resistance. B. distachyon is also becoming a useful model system for studies of evolutionary developmental biology, in particular to contrast molecular genetic mechanisms with dicotyledon model systems, notably Arabidopsis thaliana. The finding of higher genetic diversity in eastern Iberian populations occurring in basic soils suggests that these populations can be better adapted than those occurring in western areas of the Iberian Peninsula where the soils are more acidic and accumulate toxic Al ions.
