= East Wood, Great Casterton =

Coordinates: 52.693°N 0.516°W

- Site of Special Scientific Interest
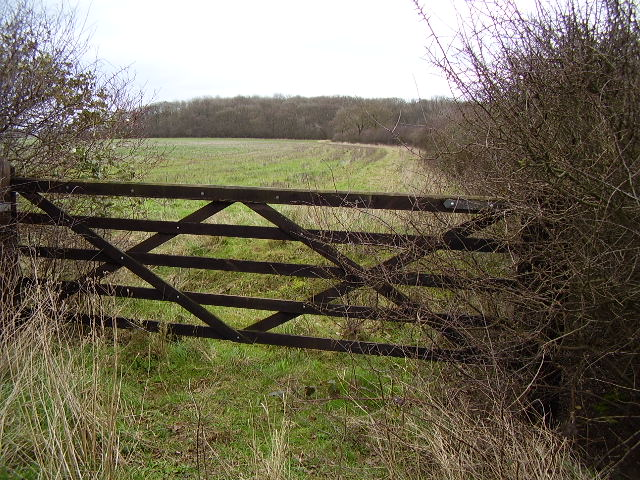
- Location of East Wood, Great Casterton.
- Area of search: Rutland
- Grid reference: TF 004 116
- Interest: Biological
- Area: 6.6 hectares
- Notification date: 1983
- Location map: Magic Map

East Wood is a 6.6-hectare (16-acre) biological Site of Special Scientific Interest north of Great Casterton in Rutland.

This semi-natural wood is on boulder clay of glacial origin. The dominant trees are ash, oak and wych elm, with a few wild service trees and small leaved limes. In well-drained areas there is a diverse ground flora typical of ancient woodland, and in the less well-drained parts, tufted hair-grass predominates.

== SSSI ==
East Wood, Great Casterton was designated as a Site of Special Scientific Interest (SSSI) under Section 28 of the Wildlife and Countryside Act 1981 as being one of the best surviving examples in Central England of a semi-natural woodland. It is situated on private land with no public access. One edge is bounded by a sinuous hedge-bank. The soil is composed of boulder clay of glacial origin over Middle Jurassic limestone from the Great Oolite Group. The mature trees forming the canopy are predominantly European ash and pedunculate oak, interspersed with the occasional small-leaved lime, wych elm and wild service tree. Smaller trees and shrubs include hawthorn, hazel, spindle, common dogwood and privet. In wetter parts of the wood, tufted hair-grass provides the main ground cover, but in drier areas there is a diverse flora characteristic of undisturbed ancient woodlands which includes wood anemone, primrose, sweet woodruff, yellow archangel and common violet, as well as a number of less common species which are seldom found in this area.
