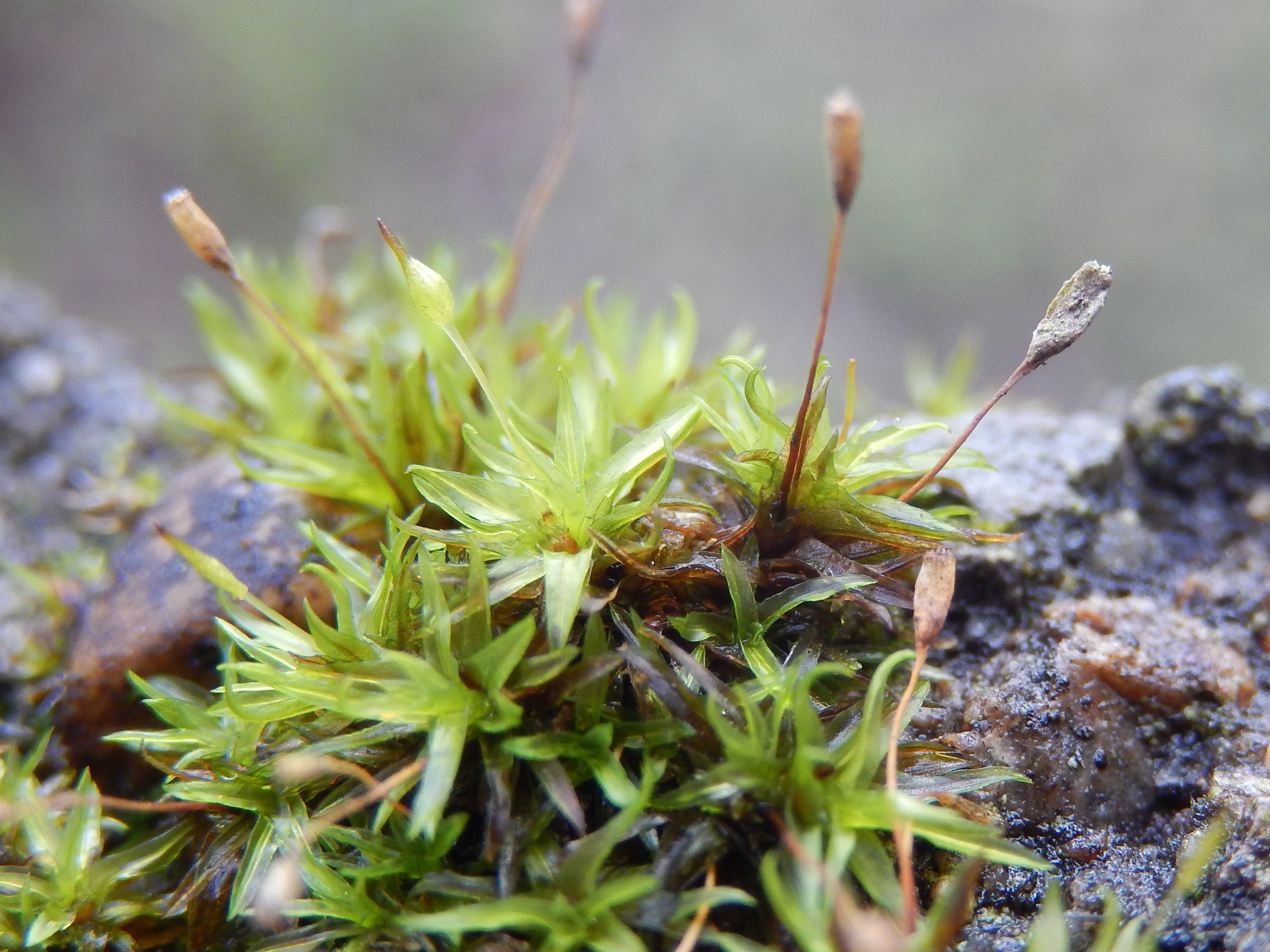

Scientific classification
- Kingdom: Plantae
- Division: Bryophyta
- Class: Bryopsida
- Subclass: Dicranidae
- Order: Grimmiales
- Family: Ptychomitriaceae
- Genus: Ptychomitrium; Fürnr.

Type species
- Ptychomitrium polyphyllum (Sw.) Bruch & Schimp.

Synonyms
- Pthychomitrium Fürnr., alternate spelling; Brachysteleum subg. Ptychomitrium (Fürnr.) Schimp.; Glyphomitrium subg. Ptychomitrium (Fürnr.) Schimp.; Brachypodium Brid. 1826, illegitimate homonym not P. Beauv. 1812 (Poaceae); Brachysteleum Rchb.; Henoniella Duby; Notarisia Hampe; Pticomitrium Fürnr.; Ptycomitrium Fürnr. ex Ångstr.

= Ptychomitrium =

Genus of mosses

Ptychomitrium is a widespread genus of mosses found in many parts of the world.

Species

1. Ptychomitrium acutifolium
2. Ptychomitrium adamsonii
3. Ptychomitrium africanum
4. Ptychomitrium aligrimmioides
5. Ptychomitrium altaicum
6. Ptychomitrium angusticarpum
7. Ptychomitrium australe
8. Ptychomitrium azoricum
9. Ptychomitrium barrii
10. Ptychomitrium brevifolium
11. Ptychomitrium chimborazense
12. Ptychomitrium cochabambae
13. Ptychomitrium cockerellae
14. Ptychomitrium crassinervium
15. Ptychomitrium crispatum
16. Ptychomitrium cucullatifolium
17. Ptychomitrium cylindrothecium
18. Ptychomitrium deltorii
19. Ptychomitrium dentatum
20. Ptychomitrium depressum
21. Ptychomitrium diexaratum
22. Ptychomitrium drummondii
23. Ptychomitrium emersum
24. Ptychomitrium evanidinerve
25. Ptychomitrium exaratifolium
26. Ptychomitrium fauriei
27. Ptychomitrium fernandesianum
28. Ptychomitrium ferrugineum
29. Ptychomitrium fluviatile
30. Ptychomitrium formosicum
31. Ptychomitrium gardneri
32. Ptychomitrium helenicum
33. Ptychomitrium hieronymi
34. Ptychomitrium howeanum
35. Ptychomitrium incurvum
36. Ptychomitrium indicum
37. Ptychomitrium isoskelos
38. Ptychomitrium laxifolium
39. Ptychomitrium lepidomitrium
40. Ptychomitrium ligulatum
41. Ptychomitrium lindmanii
42. Ptychomitrium linearifolium
43. Ptychomitrium lobuliferum
44. Ptychomitrium mairei
45. Ptychomitrium mamillosum
46. Ptychomitrium marginatum
47. Ptychomitrium microblastum
48. Ptychomitrium mittenii
49. Ptychomitrium mucronatum
50. Ptychomitrium neocaledonicum
51. Ptychomitrium nigrescens
52. Ptychomitrium obtusifolium
53. Ptychomitrium papillosum
54. Ptychomitrium patens
55. Ptychomitrium platyphyllum
56. Ptychomitrium polyphylloides
57. Ptychomitrium polyphyllum
58. Ptychomitrium pulvinare
59. Ptychomitrium reichenbachianum
60. Ptychomitrium rugosum
61. Ptychomitrium sellowianum
62. Ptychomitrium serratum
63. Ptychomitrium sinense
64. Ptychomitrium standleyi
65. Ptychomitrium subcrispatum
66. Ptychomitrium subcylindricum
67. Ptychomitrium subdentatum
68. Ptychomitrium tortula
69. Ptychomitrium uruguense
70. Ptychomitrium vaginatum
71. Ptychomitrium vernicosum
72. Ptychomitrium wilsonii
73. Ptychomitrium yulongshanum
