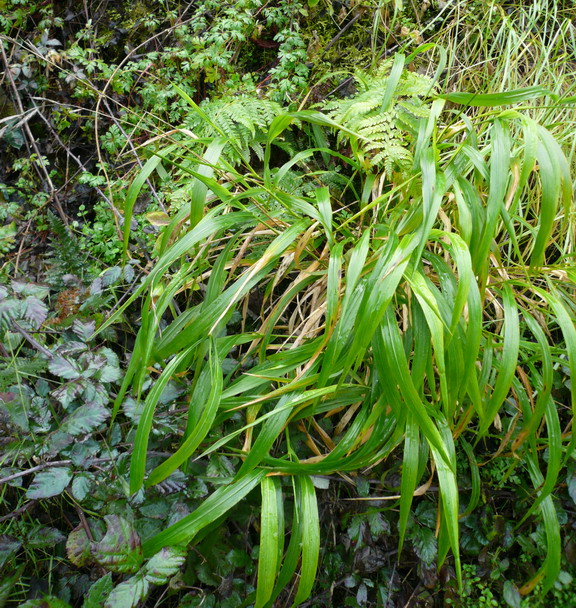
- Habitus

Scientific classification
- Kingdom: Plantae
- Clade: Tracheophytes
- Clade: Angiosperms
- Clade: Monocots
- Clade: Commelinids
- Order: Poales
- Family: Poaceae
- Subfamily: Pooideae
- Genus: Brachypodium
- Species: B. sylvaticum

Binomial name
- Brachypodium sylvaticum (Huds.) P.Beauv. (1812)

Synonyms
- Agropyron sylvaticum (Huds.) Chevall. (1827); Brachypodium pinnatum var. sylvaticum (Huds.) St.-Yves (1934); Brachypodium pinnatum var. sylvaticum (Huds.) Knoche (1921); Brevipodium sylvaticum (Huds.) Á.Löve & D.Löve (1961); Bromus pinnatus var. sylvaticus (Huds.) Wahlenb. (1805); Bromus sylvaticus (Huds.) Lyons (1763); Festuca pinnata var. sylvatica (Huds.) Huds. (1778); Festuca sylvatica Huds. (1762); Triticum sylvaticum (Huds.) Moench (1777)

= Brachypodium sylvaticum =

False brome Brachypodium sylvaticum

Species of grass

Brachypodium sylvaticum, commonly known as false-brome, slender false brome or wood false brome, is a perennial grass native to Europe, Asia and Africa. Its native range includes most of Europe, northwestern Africa, Sudan and Eritrea, Western and Central Asia, the Indian subcontinent, China, Korea, Japan, Malesia, and New Guinea.

The bunchgrass is most commonly found in forests and woodlands, preferring the shaded canopy, but may grow in open areas. It prefers well drained neutral and calcerous soils, and avoids wet conditions.

== Description ==
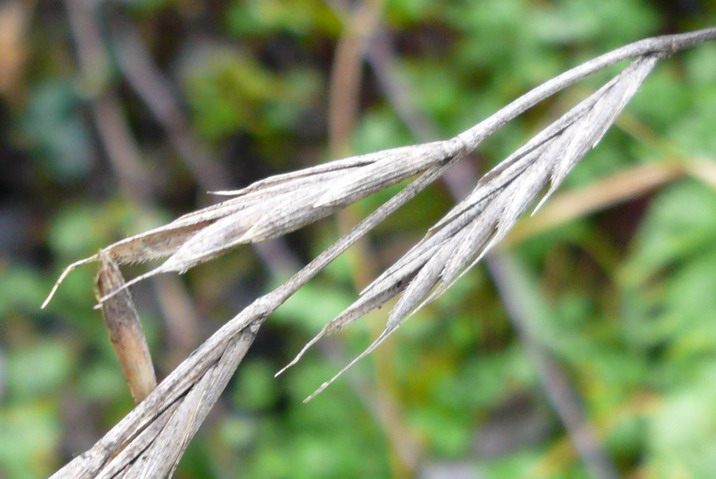
Dry inflorescence

Brachypodium sylvaticum is a tall tufted perennial bunchgrass that grows up to about a 0.9 metres (3.0 ft) high.

The drooping leaf blade of the plant is dark green, or bright-yellow green, flat and up to 12 mm wide with a fringe of hairs surrounding the edge of the leaf. The leaves do not have auricles. The leaf blade is joined to the hollow culm by the leaf sheath. This hairy sheath is open and surrounds the culm. The culm is pilose (long, soft, hairy), and typically has 4 to 5 nodes. The ligules are blunt, 1–6 millimetres (0.039–0.236 in) long.

The grass has drooping narrow long spikelets of flowers on very short pedicels. The flower head is 6–20 centimetres (2.4–7.9 in) long, the plant flowering in July and August. Its awns are straight and 6–18 millimetres (0.24–0.71 in) long, projecting out of the end of the spikelets.

== Subspecies ==
Two subspecies are accepted.

- Brachypodium sylvaticum subsp. creticum H.Scholz & Greuter – Crete
- Brachypodium sylvaticum subsp. sylvaticum – Eurasia, northern Africa, and New Guinea

== Wildlife value ==
Its seeds can be dispersed by wildlife and humans. The caterpillars of some Lepidoptera use it as a foodplant, e.g. the chequered skipper (Carterocephalus palaemon) and the Essex skipper (Thymelicus lineola).

== Invasive species in North America ==
The grass is an introduced species in North America. Brachypodium sylvaticum is an invasive species colonizing new areas and outcompeting native plants. As this species has spread to the Pacific Northwest of the U.S. it has demonstrated a capability of dominating forest understories and open grasslands to the exclusion of all other flora found in those areas.

Recent observations suggest that populations at the leading edge of the expanding range undergo an establishment phase before they can contribute to the local invasion, perhaps because newly colonized populations are suffering from inbreeding depression.

Oregon

Brachypodium sylvaticum is a newly invasive brome species in Oregon that is rapidly expanding in the Pacific Northwest. Although B. sylvaticum appears to be in the early phases of invasion in North America, it has become a noxious weed throughout the Willamette Valley area of Oregon since the late 1980s. It is most likely that B. sylvaticum was first introduced to Oregon in range experiments when accessions from the native range were planted near Eugene and Corvallis in the Willamette Valley using seed obtained from the USDA Office of Foreign Seed and Plant Introduction anywhere between 70 and 80 years ago.

== Gallery ==
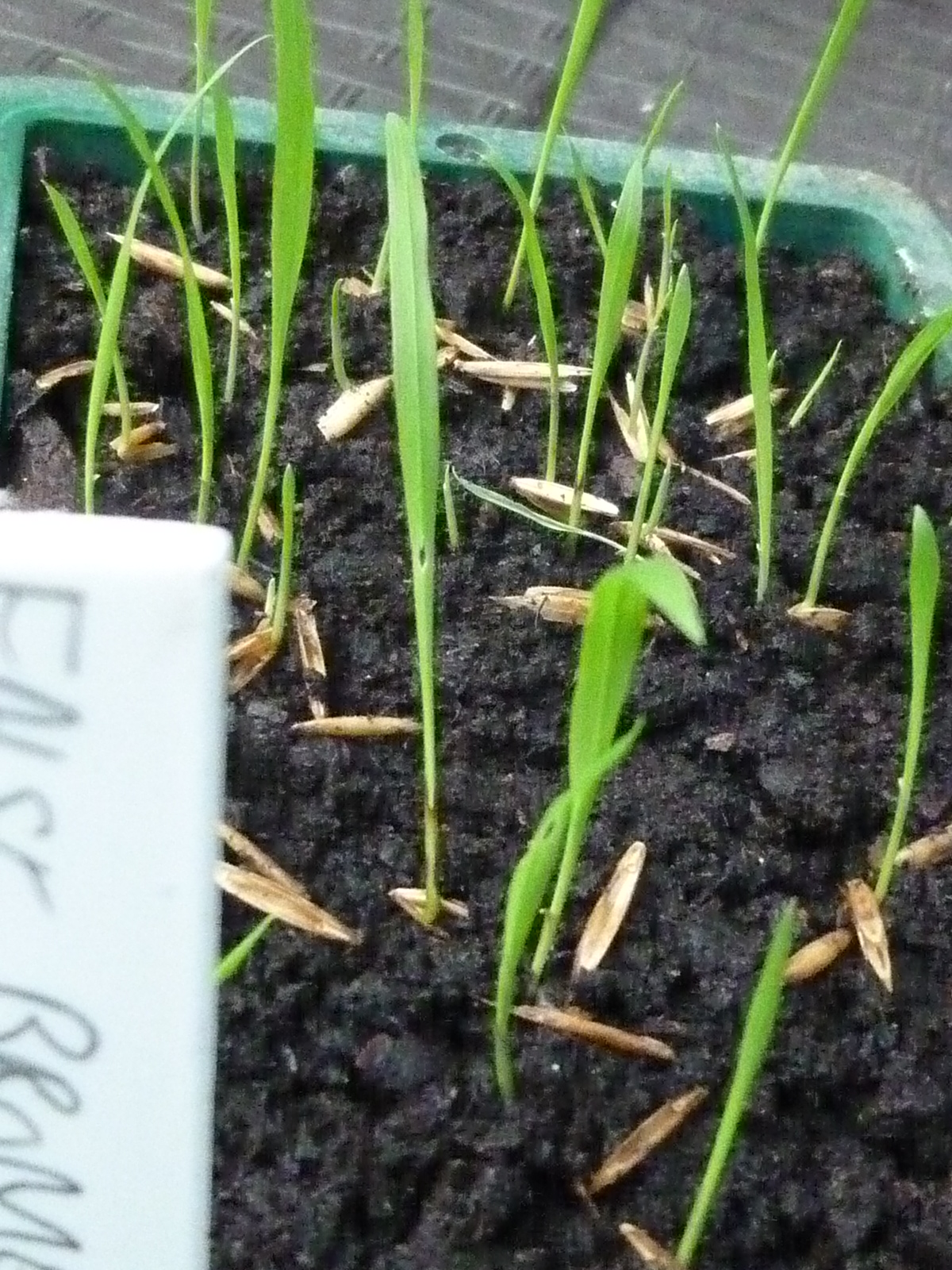
seedling
