= Shacklewell Hollow =

Protected area in Rutland, England

Coordinates: 52.658°N 0.558°W

- Site of Special Scientific Interest
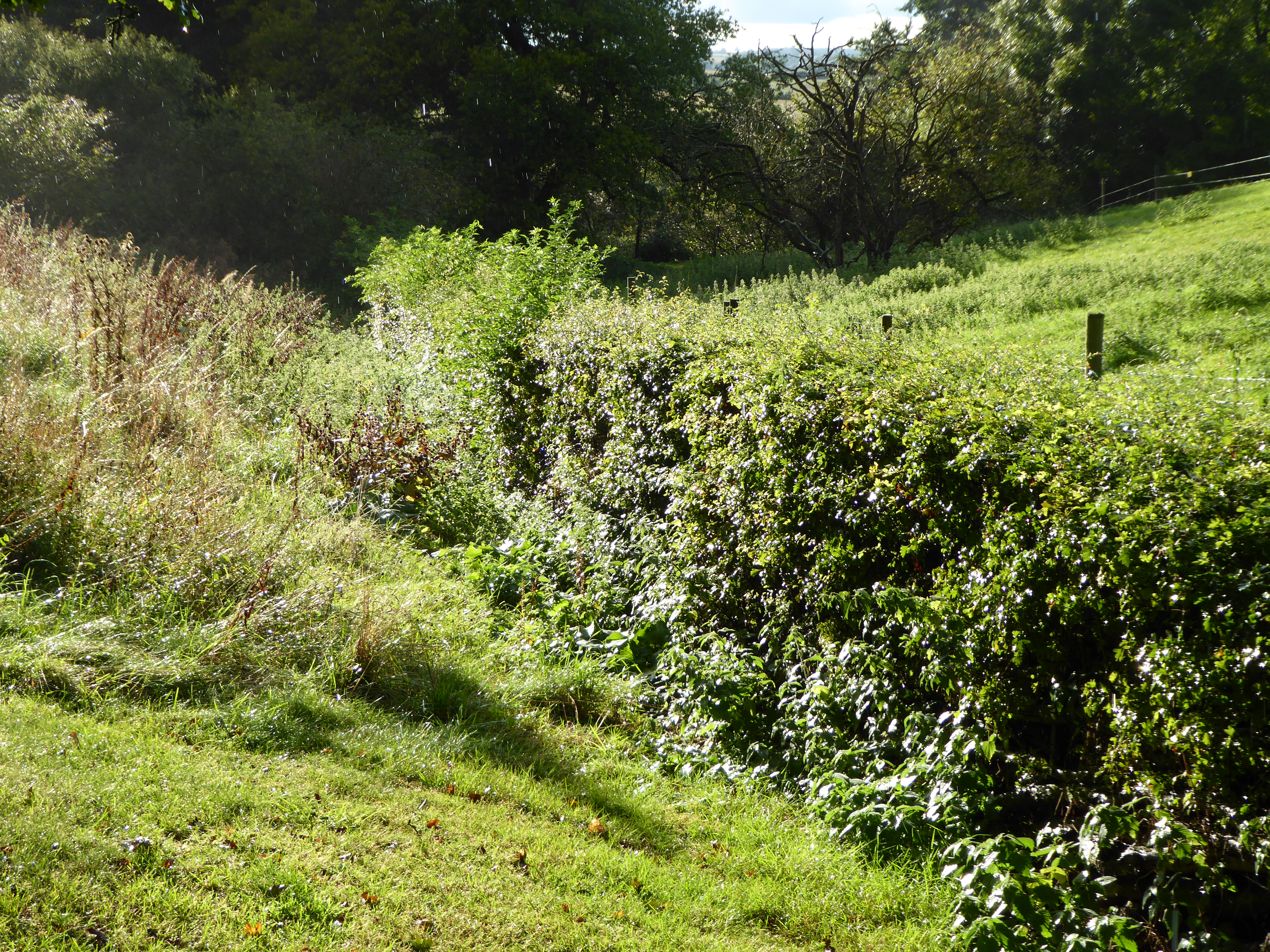
- Location of Shacklewell Hollow.
- Area of search: Rutland
- Grid reference: SK 976 077
- Interest: Biological
- Area: 3.2 hectares
- Notification date: 1983
- Location map: Magic Map

Shacklewell Hollow is a 3.2 hectares (7.9 acres) biological Site of Special Scientific Interest east of Empingham in Rutland, and beside the A606 road.

This marshy site is in the valley of a tributary of the River Gwash. The marsh is dominated by hard rush, and there are several artificial ponds with large populations of mare's tail. There are also areas of calcareous grassland and alder wood.

The site is private property with no public access.

Shacklewell Hollow is also the name of a Scout campsite. It can accommodate up to 100 people in 4.5 acres (1.8 ha) of grassland and woods.
