= Burley and Rushpit Woods =

UK Site of Special Scientific Interest

Coordinates: 52.679°N 0.684°W

- Site of Special Scientific Interest
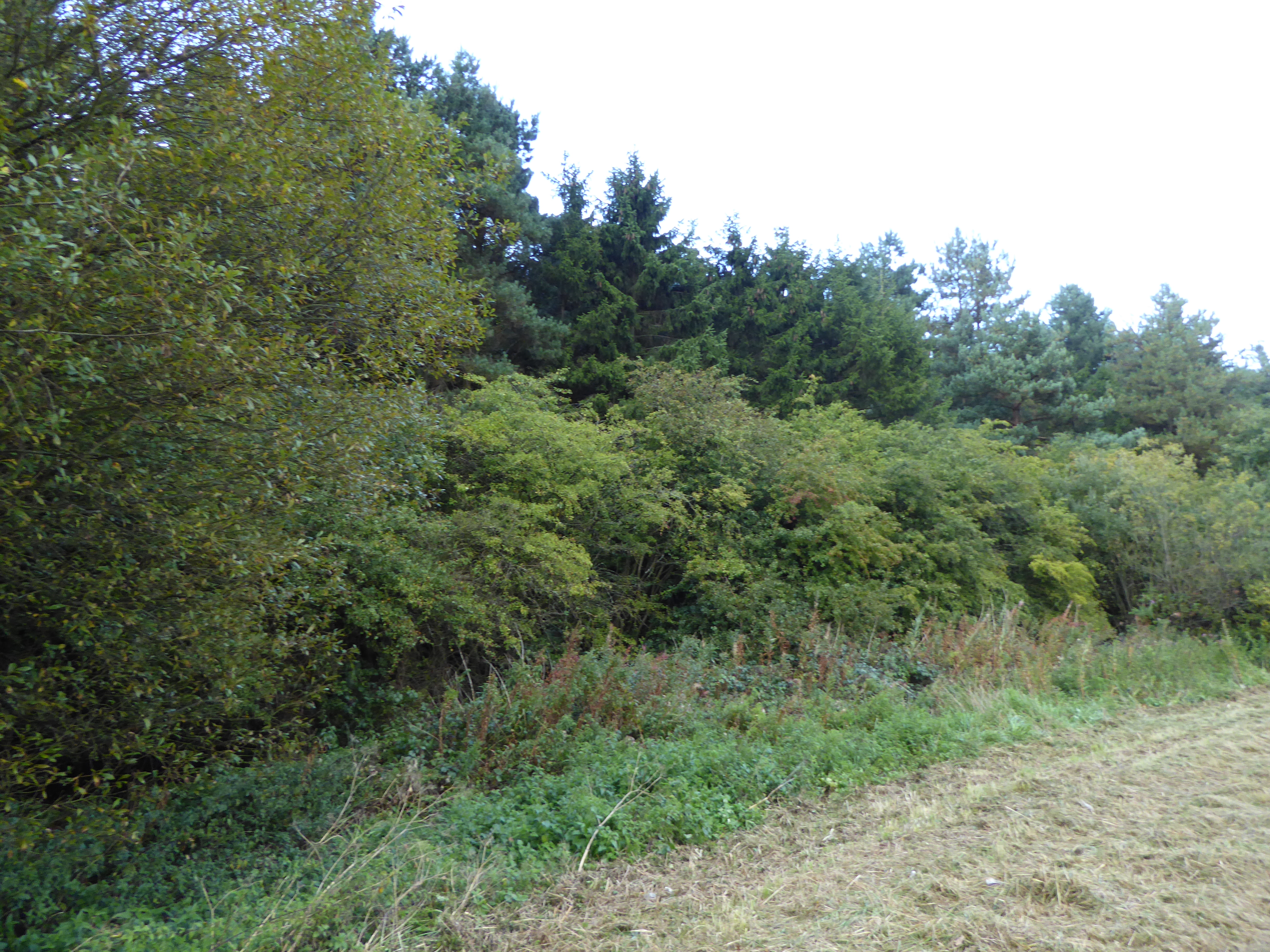
- Burley Wood
- Location of Burley and Rushpit Woods.
- Area of search: Rutland
- Grid reference: SK 891 098
- Interest: Biological
- Area: 161.2 hectares
- Notification date: 1992
- Location map: Magic Map

Burley and Rushpit Woods is a 161.2 hectares (398 acres) biological Site of Special Scientific Interest in the parish of Burley, east of Oakham in Rutland.

These woods on upper Lias clay have many mature and over-mature trees and considerable dead wood. The dominant tree is oak in most of the forest, giving way to ash in the remainder. The lichens are of regional importance, and the invertebrates include one Red Data Book and five nationally scarce species.

The woods are private land with no public access.
