= North Luffenham Quarry =

Coordinates: 52.622°N 0.582°W

- Site of Special Scientific Interest
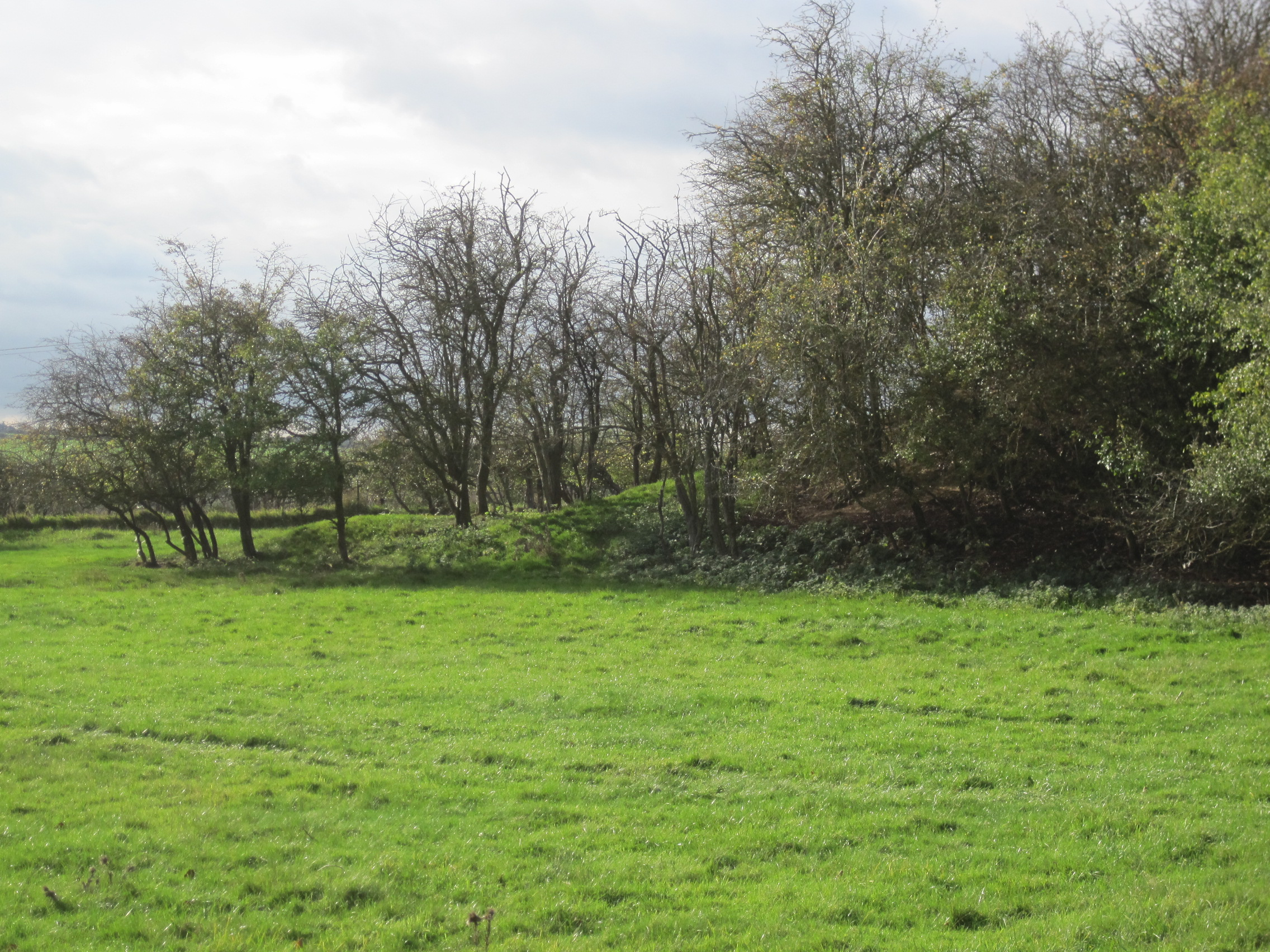
- Location of North Luffenham Quarry.
- Area of search: Rutland
- Grid reference: SK 961 036
- Interest: Biological
- Area: 4.6 hectares
- Notification date: 1983
- Location map: Magic Map

North Luffenham Quarry is a 4.6-hectare (11-acre) biological Site of Special Scientific Interest east of North Luffenham in Rutland.

This is calcareous grassland on thin soils derived from Jurassic Lincolnshire Limestone. Flora include basil thyme, marjoram and bee orchid. There are increasing areas of scrub, and the mixture of habitats has a diverse variety of insect species.

The site is private land with no public access.
