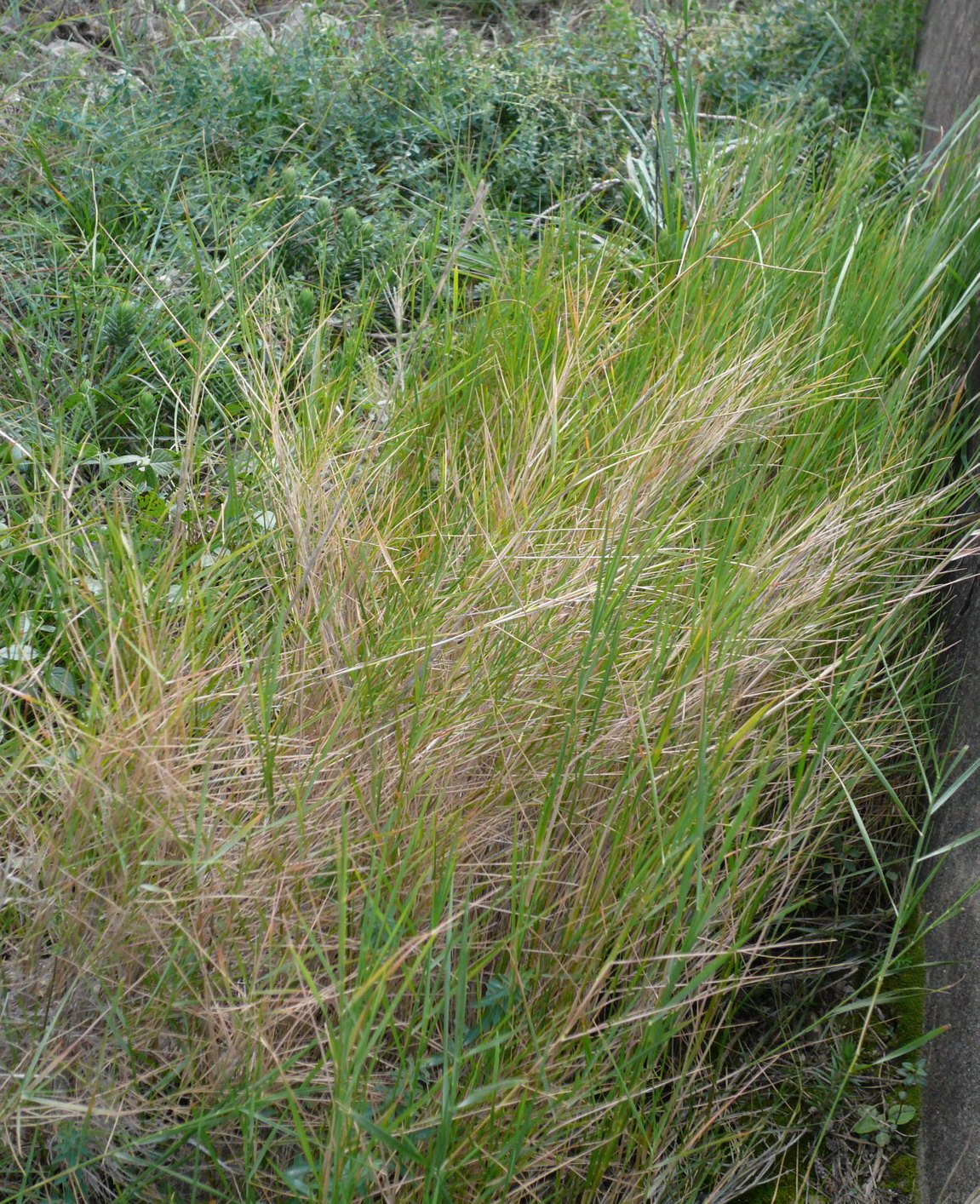
- In Catalonia

Conservation status
- Least Concern (IUCN 3.1)

Scientific classification
- Kingdom: Plantae
- Clade: Embryophytes
- Clade: Tracheophytes
- Clade: Angiosperms
- Clade: Monocots
- Clade: Commelinids
- Order: Poales
- Family: Poaceae
- Subfamily: Pooideae
- Genus: Brachypodium
- Species: B. retusum

Binomial name
- Brachypodium retusum (Pers.) P.Beauv.

Synonyms
- List: Bromus retusus Pers.; Brachypodium brevisetum (DC.) Roem. & Schult.; Brachypodium hostii Link; Brachypodium mucronatum Willk.; Brachypodium obtusifolium Link; Brachypodium plukenetii (All.) C.Presl; Brachypodium ramosum Roem. & Schult.; Brachypodium scoparium Sennen; Brachypodium willkommii Sennen ex St.-Yves; Brachypodium wilsonis Sennen ex St.-Yves; Festuca breviseta (DC.) Steud.; Festuca caespitosa Desf.; Festuca ramosa (Roem. & Schult.) Roth; Triticum brevisetum DC.; Triticum caespitosum (Desf.) DC.; Triticum obtusifolium Boiss.

= Brachypodium retusum =

Species of plant

Brachypodium retusum, the Mediterranean false brome, is a species of perennial grass in the family Poaceae (true grasses). They have a self-supporting growth form and simple, broad leaves and dry fruit. Individuals can grow to 0.8m tall. The species is native to Europe, Africa, Western Asia and the Arabian Peninsula.

== Sources ==
This article incorporates text from a free content work. Licensed under CC0 (license statement/permission). Text taken from Brachypodium retusum. Encyclopedia of Life.
