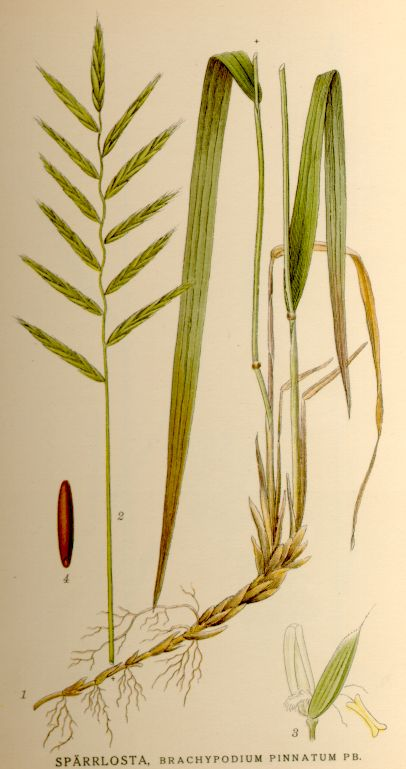
- Painting by the Swedish botanist C. A. M. Lindman

Scientific classification
- Kingdom: Plantae
- Clade: Tracheophytes
- Clade: Angiosperms
- Clade: Monocots
- Clade: Commelinids
- Order: Poales
- Family: Poaceae
- Subfamily: Pooideae
- Genus: Brachypodium
- Species: B. pinnatum

Binomial name
- Brachypodium pinnatum (L.) P.Beauv.

= Brachypodium pinnatum =

Species of grass

Brachypodium pinnatum, the heath false brome or tor-grass, is a species of grass with a widespread distribution in temperate regions of the Northern Hemisphere. It typically grows in calcareous grassland, and reaches 70–120 centimetres (28–47 in) tall. The flowerhead is open, with 10 to 15 erect spikelets.

== Distribution ==
The plant can be found in such US states as California, Massachusetts, and Oregon.

== Ecology ==
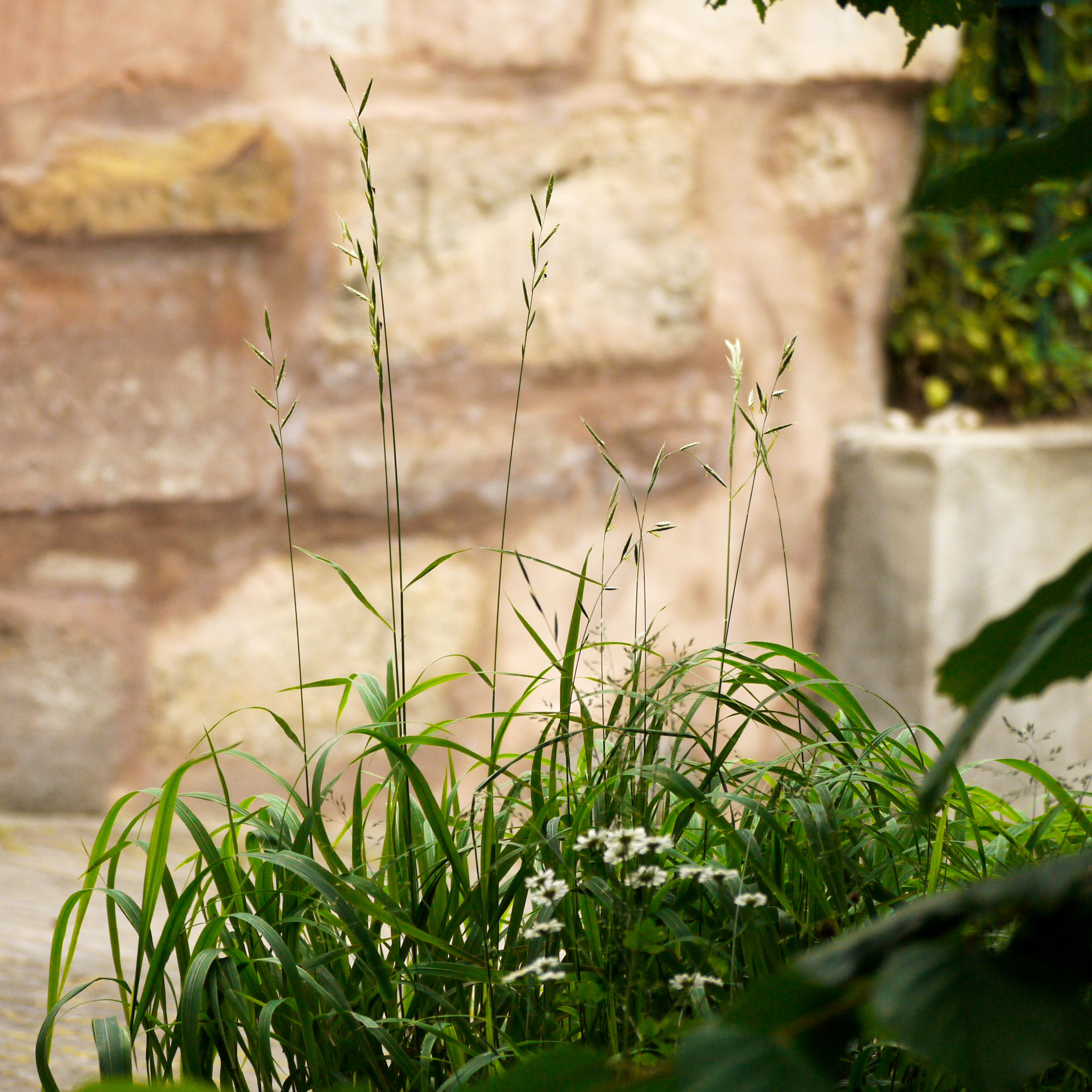
Blooming next to a low garden wall

The caterpillars of some Lepidoptera use it as a food plant, e.g. the Essex skipper (Thymelicus lineola). It is also one of the most important host grasses for Auchenorrhyncha in central Europe.

== Archeological Significance ==
A cape/mat made of Brachypodium was discovered as part of the kit of a chalcolithic mummy named Ötzi. Bundles of the plant were tied together with Tilia bast fibre to form a large cape or mat.

== See also ==
- Brachypodium distachyon
