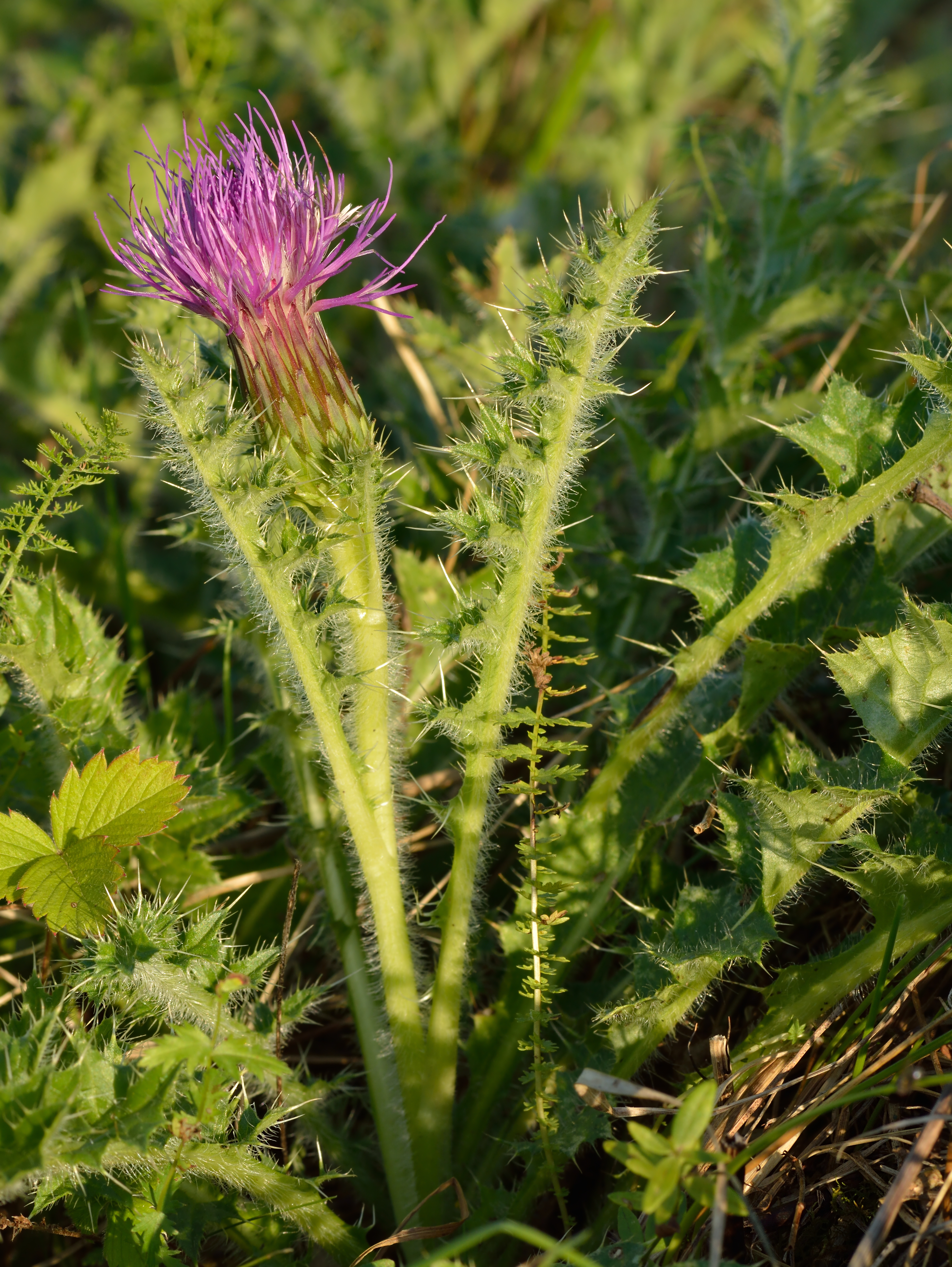
- Cirsium acaule/acaulon (Dwarf Thistle)

Scientific classification
- Kingdom: Plantae
- Clade: Embryophytes
- Clade: Tracheophytes
- Clade: Spermatophytes
- Clade: Angiosperms
- Clade: Eudicots
- Clade: Asterids
- Order: Asterales
- Family: Asteraceae
- Genus: Cirsium
- Species: C. acaule

Binomial name
- Cirsium acaule (L.) A.A.Weber ex Wigg. 1780 not Scop. 1780 nor Ledeb. 1833

Synonyms
- Synonymy: Carduus acaulis L.; Carduus caulescens Pers. ex Steud.; Carduus gmelini Steud.; Carduus rosenii Vill.; Carduus spinosus Gueldenst. ex Ledeb.; Cirsium allionii Spenn.; Cirsium alpestre Nägeli; Cirsium bipontinum F.W.Schultz; Cirsium consanguineum DC.; Cirsium decipiens Nyman; Cirsium decoloratum W.D.J.Koch; Cirsium exigium Bubani; Cirsium fallax Franch.; Cirsium lachenalii W.D.J.Koch; Cirsium rosenii Vill.; Cirsium sorocephalum DC.; Cnicus affghanicus C.Winkl. ex Petr.

= Cirsium acaule =

Species of flowering plant in the daisy family

Cirsium acaule or acaulon has the English name dwarf thistle or stemless thistle. It is widespread across much of Europe. It is often found on short, calcerous grasslands.

== Description ==
Cirsium acaule is a perennial herb. The leaves are a spreading rosette, spiny, 10 to 15 cm (3.9 to 5.9 in) long.

There is usually only one flower head, although there can sometimes be 2 or 3. Usually it is not stalked from the leaf rosette. The flower head is 3 to 4 cm (1.2 to 1.6 in) long, the florets are red/purple. They flower from June to September.
