= List of people associated with New College, Oxford =

This is a list of notable people affiliated with New College, Oxford, including former students, and current and former academics and fellows. The college is a part of Oxford University, England. The disproportionate amount of men on this list is partially explained by the fact that for the first 600 years of its history, from its foundation in 1379 until 1979, women were barred from studying at New College.

== Former students ==
=== 14th to 19th centuries ===
- Henry Chichele, Archbishop of Canterbury
- John Macleod Campbell Crum, priest and hymnwriter
- Sir T.W. Edgeworth David (1858–1934), geologist, polar explorer
- William Sealy Gosset, statistician
- William Howley, Archbishop of Canterbury (1828–1848)
- Thomas Hughes, footballer, won FA Cup twice in 1870s
- The Ven. John Ingram, English Jesuit and martyr
- Leopold George Wickham Legg, historian and editor of the Dictionary of National Biography
- William Pargeter, eighteenth-century physician known for his interest in mental illness
- Francis Turner, 17th century Bishop of Ely
- William Warham, former Archbishop of Canterbury
- William Waynflete, founder of Magdalen College and Lord Chancellor of England; doubtful if he was an alumnus.
- James Woodforde, clergyman

=== 20th to 21st centuries ===
- Simon Baron-Cohen, developmental psychopathologist
- Kate Beckinsale, actor
- Tony Benn, Labour Party politician
- Katharine Birbalsingh, Headmistress and Founder of the Michaela Community School
- Tim Boswell, life peer, former Conservative MP
- Gyles Brandreth, writer and broadcaster, Conservative MP for Chester
- Gary Cooper, musician and conductor
- Michael Crick, journalist
- Richard Crossman, politician
- Rachel Cusk, author
- Angus Deayton, comedian, actor, television presenter
- William Douglas Home, dramatist and politician
- John Fowles, novelist
- Stephen Eyre, High Court judge
- Hugh Gaitskell, Labour Party leader (1955–63)
- John Galsworthy, novelist and playwright
- Peter Garwood (1931–2020), HM Inspector of Schools
- William Henry Goschen, (1870-1943) KBE, banker
- Robert Goff, Baron Goff of Chieveley, British judge
- Victor Gollancz, publisher
- Denys Graham, actor
- Hugh Grant, actor
- General Sir John Hackett, soldier
- J. B. S. Haldane, biologist
- Adrian Holman, British diplomat
- Douglas Jay, British Labour Party politician
- Robert Jay, Counsel to the Leveson Inquiry and judge of the High Court of Justice
- Harold Laski, political theorist
- Bernard Longley, Roman Catholic Archbishop of Birmingham
- Neil MacGregor, art historian, director of the British Museum
- Outram Marshall, clergyman, organising secretary of the Church Union
- Michael Meacher, Labour Party politician
- Sir Frank Meyer, businessman and Conservative MP
- Nathaniel Micklem, theologian, son of the above
- Peter Francis Middleton, pilot and grandfather of Catherine, Princess of Wales
- Alasdair Milne, BBC Director General
- Kate Mosse, novelist
- Sir Albert Napier, Permanent Secretary to the Lord Chancellor's Office
- Rageh Omaar, broadcast journalist
- Rachel Reeves, the UK's first female Chancellor of the Exchequer
- George Renwick, Olympic athlete
- Susan Rice, American diplomat, policy advisor, and public official
- Sir Bernard Rix, Judge, a Lord Justice of Appeal
- Alan Rodger, Baron Rodger of Earlsferry, Supreme Court judge
- Oliver Russell, 2nd Baron Ampthill, Governor of Madras
- Pardis Sabeti, geneticist
- Jonathan Sacks, Chief Rabbi
- Mel Smith, comedian and film director
- Rick Stein, chef
- Marc Tessier-Lavigne, neuroscientist
- Frank Thompson, SOE officer
- Daniel Topolski, freelance writer
- David Verney, 21st Baron Willoughby de Broke, UKIP peer
- Benjamin Whitaker Labour politician and former MP
- Richard Wilberforce, Baron Wilberforce, judge and Lord of Appeal in Ordinary
- Naomi Wolf, American feminist
- Owen Sheers, Welsh poet, novelist and playwright
- Lucy Worsley, historian, author and television presenter

== Fellows and staff ==
- A. J. Ayer, Wykeham Professor of logic
- Isaiah Berlin
- Alan Bullock
- Raymond Carr
- David Cecil
- Richard Dawkins, Biology
- Michael Dummett, Wykeham Professor of logic
- Robin Lane Fox, Ancient History
- J. B. S. Haldane (also an alumnus), Biology
- W. D. Hamilton, Biology
- G. H. Hardy
- H. L. A. Hart, Philosophy, Jurisprudence
- Nigel Hitchin, Savilian Professor of Geometry
- Julian Huxley, Biology
- Willis Lamb, Wykeham Professor of Physics
- Hermione Lee, first woman Professorial Fellow, from 1998
- Jane Lightfoot
- Sir Henry Martin, MP for Oxford University, fellow 1582 (also alumnus)
- Rudolf Peierls, Wykeham Professor of Physics
- Craig Raine
- Marcus du Sautoy
- Jane Shaw, Dean of Divinity
- Jeremy Sheehy, Dean of Divinity
- Joe Silk, Savilian Professor of Astronomy
- William Archibald Spooner
- Christopher Tolkien
- Harold Wilson

=== Organists and directors of music ===
- 1694 John Weldon
- 1776 Philip Hayes
- 1825 Alfred Bennett
- 1830–60 Stephen Elvey
- 1860–69 George Benjamin Arnold
- 1870 James Taylor
- 1901 Hugh Allen
- 1919 William Henry Harris
- 1929 John Dykes Bower
- 1933 Sydney Watson
- 1938 Herbert Kennedy Andrews
- 1956 Meredith Davies
- 1959 David Lumsden.
- 1976 Edward Higginbottom
- 2014 Robert Quinney
