= Choir of New College Oxford =

Collegiate choral foundation (founded 1379)

- Choir
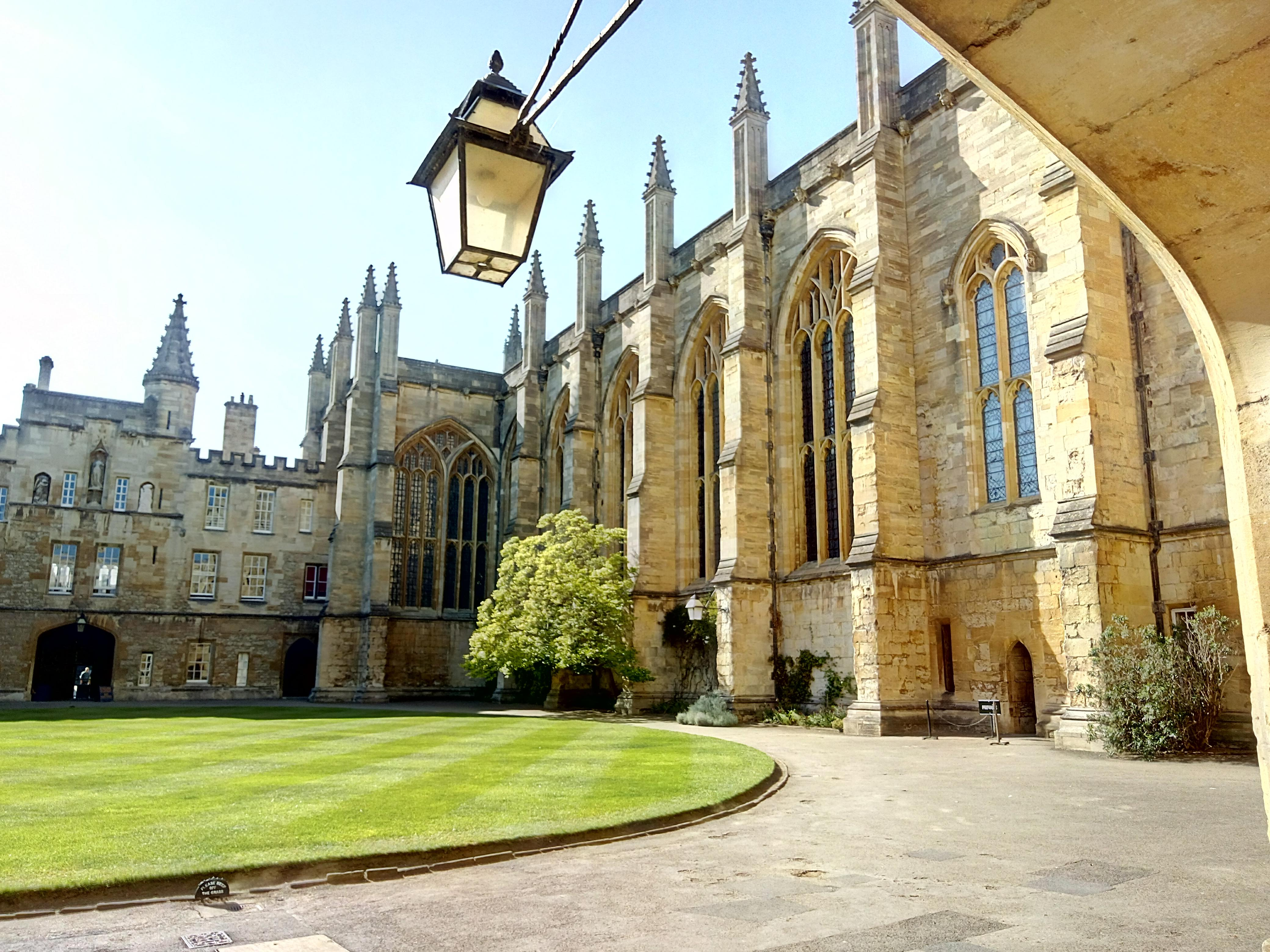
- New College Chapel, Oxford
- Founded: 1379
- Founder: William of Wykeham
- Genre: Choir
- Members: 16 boy choristers aged 7–13; 14 adult male singers
- Music director: Robert Quinney
- Website: https://www.newcollegechoir.com/

The Choir of New College Oxford is part of the collegiate foundation of New College, Oxford, established by William of Wykeham in 1379. It is one of England's oldest choral foundations and is the oldest of its kind in Oxford and Cambridge, predating its sister college in Cambridge by more than sixty years. Consisting of approximately 16 boys and 14 men, it is one of the main choral foundations of the University of Oxford and is regarded as one of the leading choirs of the world. Under Edward Higginbottom, the choir was characterised by a robust sound that allowed individual voices to be heard, and has two Gramophone Awards to its name.

== Membership ==
The choir is made up of choristers aged eight to thirteen who attend New College School, undergraduates (known as academical clerks) from the age of 18 who study at the college, and lay clerks - older, professional singers. The choir sings in the usual collegiate format of Decani and Cantoris, with seven men on either side. Historically, the gentlemen of the choir were solely lay clerks. It was only in the 1960s that the choir admitted its first undergraduate member - the young countertenor, James Bowman.

== Recordings ==
The choir has a reputation as one of the finest Anglican choirs in the world, and is known particularly for its performances of Renaissance and Baroque music.

Under the directorship of Edward Higginbottom, the choir rose to particular prominence in the 1990s with their platinum best-selling and award-winning Agnus Dei disc which includes Allegri's famous Miserere mei. The choir's discography rapidly grew under Higginbottom and now totals over 110 discs. A new chapter in the choir's recording life began in 2010 with the launch of its own label, Novum. Recordings represent a of music from the core of the English choral tradition (Howells, Stanford, Wesley, Blow, Britten, Ludford, Tomkins, Boyce, Croft, Taverner, Tye, Locke, Handel, Gibbons, Tallis and Byrd). Further projects include Bach's St John Passion and Motets, Monteverdi's Vespers, Haydn's Creation, as well as recordings of the music of Poulenc, MacMillan, Copland and the music of their contemporaries. Reflecting the interests of Edward Higginbottom, the choir has made important contributions to the performance and recording of French baroque music - in particular the music of Du Caurroy, Charpentier, Delalande, and Couperin. The choir has made numerous recordings of continental polyphony including Lassus, Palestrina, and de Monte.

In 2008, the choir won its second Gramophone Award in the early music category for their recording of Nicholas Ludford's Missa Benedicta.

== Tours ==
The choir began touring overseas in the 1960s under David Lumsden, who recognised the benefits it would bring to the choir as well as the reputation of the college. To complement their considerable recording activity, New College Choir established a busy schedule of concerts and international touring taking the choir to countries as far afield as America, Australia, Japan, and Brazil. European tours have been a mainstay of the choir's international activity, with particular emphasis on France, Germany, Italy, Belgium, The Netherlands, the Czech Republic, and Hungary. On 29 June 2015 and 2016, at the invitation of the Holy See and the Cappella Musicale Pontificia Sistina, the choir sang at the Papal Pallium mass for the Solemnity of Saints Peter and Paul in St. Peter's Basilica.

Recent sabbaticals have allowed the choir to benefit from the musical direction of Paul Brough and Dr James Lancelot.

== Organists and directors of music ==
- 1597–1610 William Wigthorpe
- 1611–1637 William Meredith
- 1637–1640 ? Pink
- 1640–1649 Simon Coleman (expelled June 1649)
- 1650–1657 ? Miles
- 1657–1660 ? Crouch
- 1660–1662 William Flexney (choral services resumed)
- 1662–1664 Robert Pickhaver
- 1664–1680 William King (son of the organist of Winchester Cathedral)
- c. 1683–1692 Richard Goodson
- 1694 ? Read (committed suicide)
- 1694–1702 John Weldon (pupil of Henry Purcell)
- 1702–1732 Simon Child
- 1732–1776 Richard Church
- 1776–1797 Philip Hayes
- 1797–1799 Isaac Pring
- 1799–1825 William Woodcock
- 1825–1830 Alfred Bennett
- 1830–1860 Stephen Elvey
- c. 1861–1865 George Arnold
- 1865–1900 James Taylor
- 1901–1919 Hugh Allen
- 1919 John Francis Shaw
- 1919–1929 William Henry Harris
- 1929–1933 John Dykes Bower
- 1933–1938 Sydney Watson
- 1938–1956 Herbert Kennedy Andrews
- 1956–1958 Albert Meredith Davies
- 1958–1976 David Lumsden
- 1976–2014 Edward Higginbottom
- 2014–present Robert Quinney

== Organ Scholars ==
Former organ scholars include:

- Patrick Russill

== Distinguished former members ==
- James Bowman
- James Gilchrist
- Jeremy Summerly - academical clerk
- Howard Goodall
- David Hurley - long-time alto of The King's Singers
- Rogers Covey-Crump
- Toby Spence
- Paul Spicer - former treble
- Simon Halsey
