= Alexander's Feast =

Alexander's Feast may refer to:

- Alexander's Feast (Dryden poem)
- Alexander's Feast (Handel), a secular oratorio with orchestral interludes
