= A Song for St. Cecilia's Day =

Poem by John Dryden

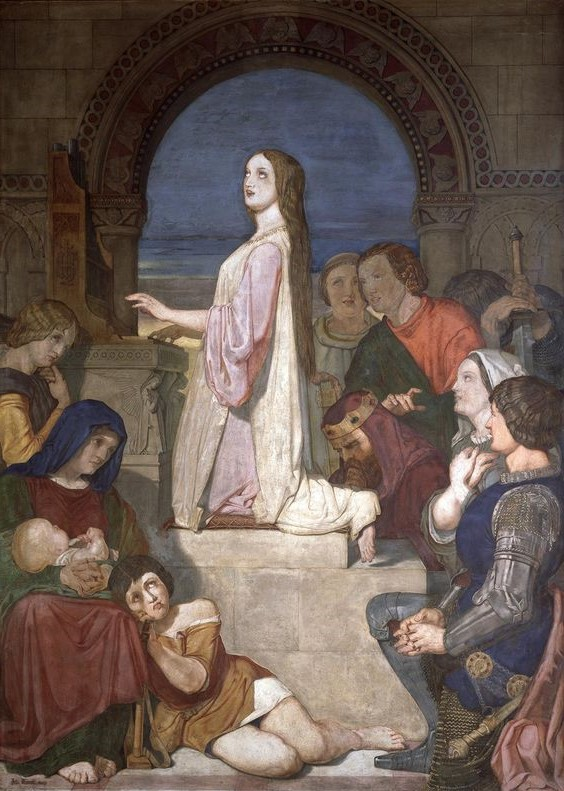
John Tenniel, St. Cecilia (1850) illustrating Dryden's ode, in the Parliament Poets' Hall

"A Song for St. Cecilia's Day" (1687) is the first of two odes written by the English Poet Laureate John Dryden for the annual festival of Saint Cecilia's Day observed in London every 22 November from 1683 to 1703. The ode was sponsored by the Musical Society of London and twice set to music.

== Background ==
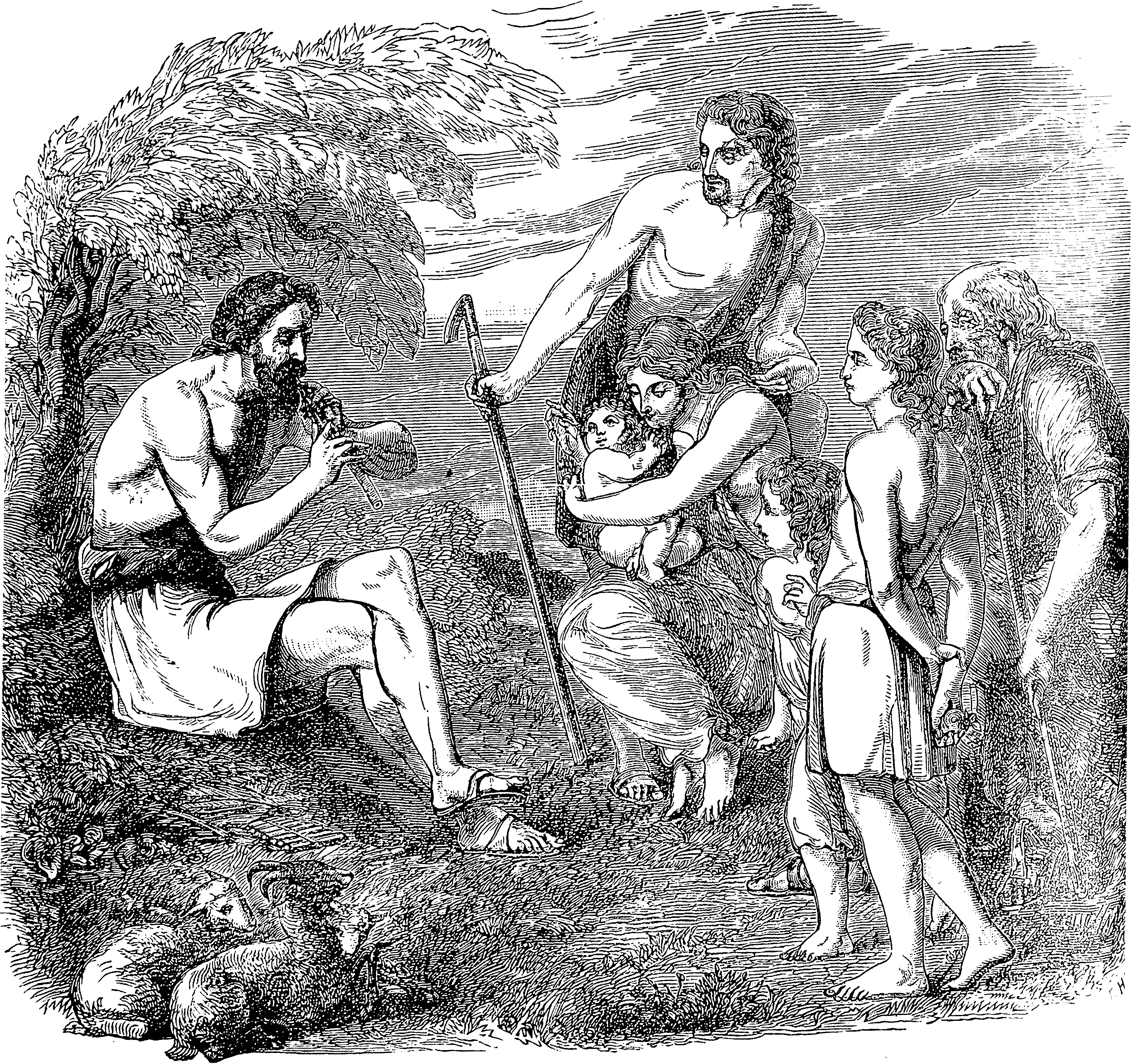
"When Jubal struck the corded shell, His list'ning brethren stood around" (Stanza 2, lines 2–3)

Saint Cecilia was, according to her legend, a Roman virgin of rank, who flourished during the reign of Marcus Aurelius Antoninus. She was a Christian, and, by her purity of life, and constant employment in the praises of her Maker, while yet on earth, obtained intercourse with an angel. Being married to Valerianus, a Pagan, she not only prevailed upon him to abstain from using any familiarity with her person, but converted him and his brother to Christianity. They were all martyrs for the faith in the reign of Septimius Severus. Chaucer has celebrated this legend in the "Second Nonne's Tale", which is almost a literal translation from the "Golden Legend" of Jacobus Januensis. As all professions and fraternities, in ancient times, made choice of a tutelar saint, Cecilia was elected the protectress of music and musicians. It was even believed that she had invented the organ, although no good authority can be discovered for such an assertion. Her festival was celebrated from an early period by those of the profession over whom she presided.

The revival of letters, with the Restoration, was attended with a similar resuscitation of the musical art; but the formation of a Musical Society, for the annual commemoration of St. Cecilia's day, did not take place until 1680. An ode, written for the occasion, was set to music, and rehearsed before the society and their stewards upon 22 November, the day dedicated to their patroness. The first effusions of this kind are miserable enough. Edmond Malone preserved a few verses of an ode, by an anonymous author, in 1633; that of 1684 was furnished by Oldham, whom Dryden commemorated by an elegy; that of 1685 was written by Nahum Tate. There was no performance in 1686; and, in 1687, Dryden furnished this ode, which was set to music by Draghi, an eminent Italian composer. Of the annual festival, Motteux gives the following account:

The 22d of November, being St Cecilia's day, is observed throughout all Europe by the lovers of music. In Italy, Germany, France, and other countries, prizes are distributed on that day, in some of the most considerable towns, to such as make the best anthem in her praise. … On that day, or the next when it falls on a Sunday, … most of the lovers of music, whereof many are persons of the first rank, meet at Stationers' Hall in London, not through a principle of superstition, but to propagate the advancement of that divine science. A splendid entertainment is provided, and before it is always a performance of music, by the best voices and hands in town: the words, which are always in the patronesses praise, are set by some of the greatest masters. This year [1691] Dr John Blow, that famous musician, composed the music; and Mr D'Urfey, whose skill in things of that nature is well known, made the words. Six stewards are chosen for each ensuing year; four of which are either persons of quality or gentlemen of note, and the two last either gentlemen of their majesties music, or some of the chief masters in town. … This feast is one of the genteelest in the world; there are no formalities nor gatherings as at others, and the appearance there is always very splendid. Whilst the company is at table, the hautboys and trumpets play successively.

== Appraisal ==
According to Samuel Johnson: "In his first ode for Cecilia's day, which is lost in the splendor of the second, there are passages which would have dignified any other poet. The first stanza is vigorous and elegant, though the word diapason is too technical, and the rhymes are too remote from one another."

From harmony, from heavenly harmony,
This universal frame began:
When nature underneath a heap of jarring atoms lay,
And could not heave her head,
The tuneful voice was heard from high,
Arise, ye more than dead.
Then cold and hot, and moist and dry,
In order to their stations leap,
And musick's power obey.
From harmony, from heavenly harmony,
This universal frame began:
From harmony to harmony
Through all the compass of the notes it ran,
The diapason closing full in man.

He continues: "The conclusion is likewise striking, but it includes an image so awful in itself, that it can owe little to poetry; and I could wish the antithesis of musick untuning had found some other place."

As from the power of sacred lays
The spheres began to move,
And sung the great Creator's praise
To all the bless'd above:
So, when the last and dreadful hour
This crumbling pageant shall devour,
The trumpet shall be heard on high,
The dead shall live, the living die,
And musick shall untune the sky.

== Settings ==
Italian composer Giovanni Battista Draghi wrote the first musical arrangement for "A Song for St. Cecilia's Day" in 1687. In the 1730s, Handel wrote new musical scores for both "A Song for St. Cecilia's Day" and Dryden's second ode on the same theme, "Alexander's Feast" (1697). In 1958, American composer Norman Dello Joio once again put the ode to music in his cantata for mixed voices and piano or brass instruments, and called it "To Saint Cecilia".

== Bibliography ==
- Scott, Walter (1808). The Works of John Dryden, Now First Collected in Eighteen Volumes. Vol. 11. Edinburgh: James Ballantyne and Co. pp. 165–170.
- Falle, G. G. (2022). "A Song for St. Cecilia's Day, 1687". RPO: Representative Poetry Online. University of Toronto Libraries. Accessed 10 March 2022.
- Bray, Roger (August 1997). "Dryden and Draghi in Harmony in the 1687 'Song for St Cecilia's Day'". Music & Letters, 78(3): pp. 319–336.
- Johnson, Samuel (1794). "Dryden". In The Lives of the Most Eminent English Poets. New ed. Vol. 2. London: T. Cadell Strand. pp. 147–148.
- Mambrol, Nasrullah (6 July 2020). "Analysis of John Dryden's Alexander's Feast". Literariness: Literary Theory and Criticism. Accessed 10 March 2022.
- Scott, Horton (23 November 2007). "A Song for St Cecilia's Day". Harper's Magazine. Accessed 10 March 2022.
- Trammell, Jena (21 February 2003). "A Song for Saint Cecilia's Day". The Literary Encyclopedia. Anderson University. Accessed 10 March 2022.
- "Norman Dello Joio: To Saint Cecilia (1958)". YouTube. 3 May 2020. Retrieved 26 December 2022.
- "St Cecilia, from A Song for St Cecilia's Day". Explore Parliament and the Royal Palace of Westminster. Accessed 4 July 2022.
