= Organ concertos, Op. 4 (Handel) =

Compositions by George Frideric Handel

George Frideric Handel, by Balthasar Denner (1727)

The Handel organ concertos, Op. 4, HWV 289–294, are six organ concertos for chamber organ and orchestra composed by George Frideric Handel in London between 1735 and 1736 and published in 1738 by the printing company of John Walsh. Written as interludes in performances of oratorios in Covent Garden, they were the first works of their kind for this combination of instruments and served as a model for later composers.

== Quotations ==
My sister gave you an account of Mr. Handel's playing here for three hours together: I did wish for you, for no entertainment in music could exceed it, except his playing on the organ in Esther, where he performs a part in two concertos, that are the finest thing that I ever heard in my life.

— Mrs. Pendarves, 15 March 1735

When Handel first came to Italy ... he became known to Domenico Scarlatti. As he was an exquisite player on the harpsichord, the Cardinal [Ottoboni] was determined to bring him and Handel together for a trial of skill ... It has been said that some gave the preference to Scarlatti. However, when they came to the Organ there was not the least pretence for doubting to which of them it belonged ... Handel had an uncommon brilliancy and command of finger; but what distinguished him from all other players who possessed these same qualities, was that amazing fullness, force and energy, which he joined with them. And this observation may be applied with as much justice to his compositions as to his playing.

— John Mainwaring, Memoirs of the Life of the late G. F. Handel, 1760

== Origins ==
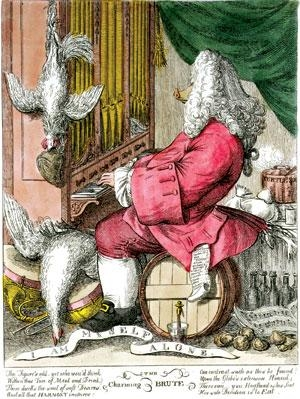
Joseph Goupy, 1754: Caricature of Handel playing a chamber organ.

One may say that Händel, in particular, is not easily surpassed by anyone in organ playing, unless it be by Bach in Leipzig.

— J. Mattheson, Der Vollkommene Capellmeister, 1739

Handel's six organ concertos were published in 1738 by John Walsh as the composer's Opus 4. The four concertos HWV 290–293 had been written to be played in the intervals of performances of his oratorios Esther, Deborah and Athalia in March and April 1735 in the newly opened theatre of John Rich in Covent Garden; the other two concertos HWV 289 and 294 served the same purpose in February and March of the following year for performances at the same venue of Alexander's Feast HWV 75, Handel's setting of John Dryden's ode.

The performances of Esther and Deborah were revivals, while Athalia was a reworking for its first London performance of a work first heard in Oxford in the summer of 1733. The violinist Festing and the composer Arne reported to the musicologist Charles Burney that Handel had included organ solos in the Oxford performances: he had "opened the organ in such a manner as astonished every hearer" and "neither themselves, nor any one of their acquaintance, had ever before heard such extempore, or such premeditated playing, on that or any other instrument."

Handel's prowess as an organist had already been demonstrated in Rome in 1707 in a contest with the composer Domenico Scarlatti, when his playing on the organ was rated higher than Scarlatti's playing on the harpsichord; his reputation as a great organist had already been established during his one-year position as cathedral organist in Halle in 1702. Handel's organ concertos thus have a special place in his oeuvre. They paved the way for Mozart and Beethoven, who like Handel achieved fame in their lifetimes as composers and performers of their own concertos.

In the sinfonias of some of his cantatas, Johann Sebastian Bach had already introduced concerto movements for organ and orchestra. However, Bach's organs in both Weimar and Leipzig were large organs with double keyboards and pedals, unlike the chamber organs used mostly in a continuo role. Bach's organ writing in the sinfonias lacks the complexity of his writing for solo organ; it is in two parts, with the bass line doubling the continuo. The small English chamber organs at Handel's disposal, with a single keyboard and no pedals, was situated directly within the orchestra, making possible a unique form of concerto close to chamber music.

The precise reasons why Handel introduced this new musical form, the concerto for chamber organ and orchestra, have been discussed in detail by Cummings (2007). He concludes that Handel, faced by financial difficulties in mounting Italian opera, exacerbated by a newly established opera company in fierce competition for an audience, decided to showcase himself as a virtuoso composer-performer, thus providing a rival attraction to the celebrated castrato Farinelli, the glittering star of his competitors.

=== Handel's chamber organs ===
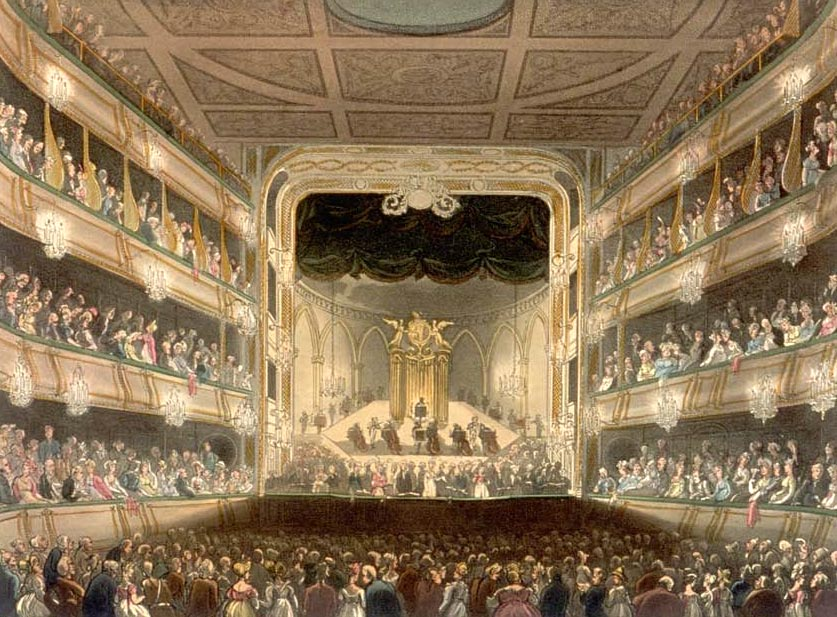
Interior of theatre at Covent Garden in 1808 with Handel's organ on the stage

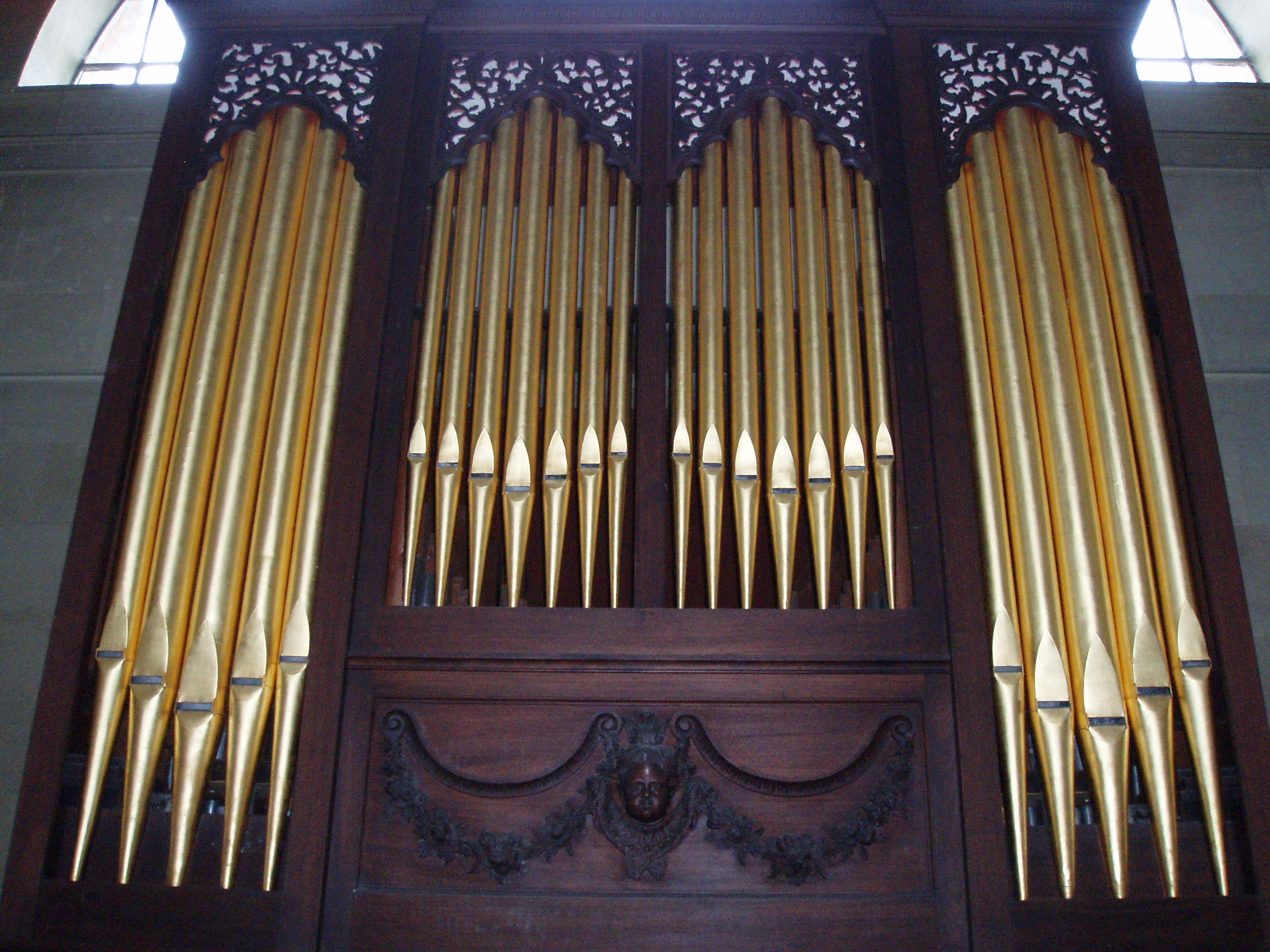
Chamber organ in St James' Church, Great Packington, originally built by Thomas Parker and Richard Bridge to specifications by Handel from 1749 for the country home of Charles Jennens at Gopsall

Handel had begun to introduce the chamber organ into his oratorios in 1732 in order to reinforce the voices in the chorus. The oratorios Esther and Deborah include elaborate choruses drawn from his earlier Coronation Anthems. Deborah is scored for two harpsichords and two organs, one for each choir in the double chorus. Two solo arias in Deborah in which the organ doubles a solo transverse flute suggest organ-stops which could produce a soft timbre. Handel's instruments he used were most likely the single keyboard portable chamber organs with four stops constructed by John Snetzler, the leading organbuilder in London.

When Handel moved his company from the King's Theatre to the newly built theatre in Covent Garden, in autumn 1734, organs appeared explicitly for the first time in his operas. The danced prologue Terpischore HWV 8b performed there contains sumptuous scoring for alto recorders, violins, violas and pizzicato cellos with the bass and treble lines doubled by organs; Handel marked the score, "Les orgues doucement, e la Teorbe".

In March 1735 the London Daily Post and General Advertiser announced that Handel had decided to incorporate in later performances of Deborah "a large new Organ, which is remarkable for the Variety of Curious Stops, being a new Invention, and a great Improvement of that Instrument." Although the maker of that instrument or its successors remains unknown, the dynamic markings in the detailed organ parts for Alexander's Feast suggest a single manual organ with six stops rather than four. Whoever the organbuilder, Handel added a codicil to his will in 1757 bequeathing to John Rich his "Great Organ which stands at the Theatre Royal in Covent Garden."

=== Rivalry between companies ===
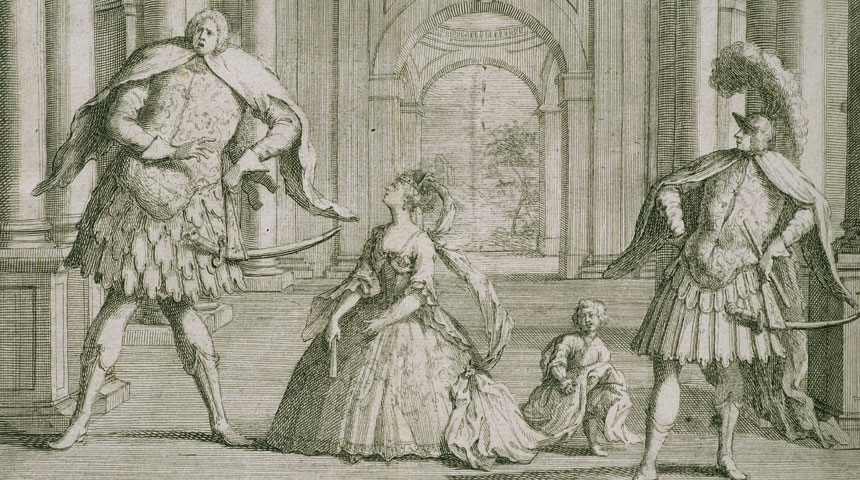
Caricature of the singers Senesino, Francesca Cuzzoni and Gaetano Berenstadt (l. to r.) in Handel's opera Flavio, 1723

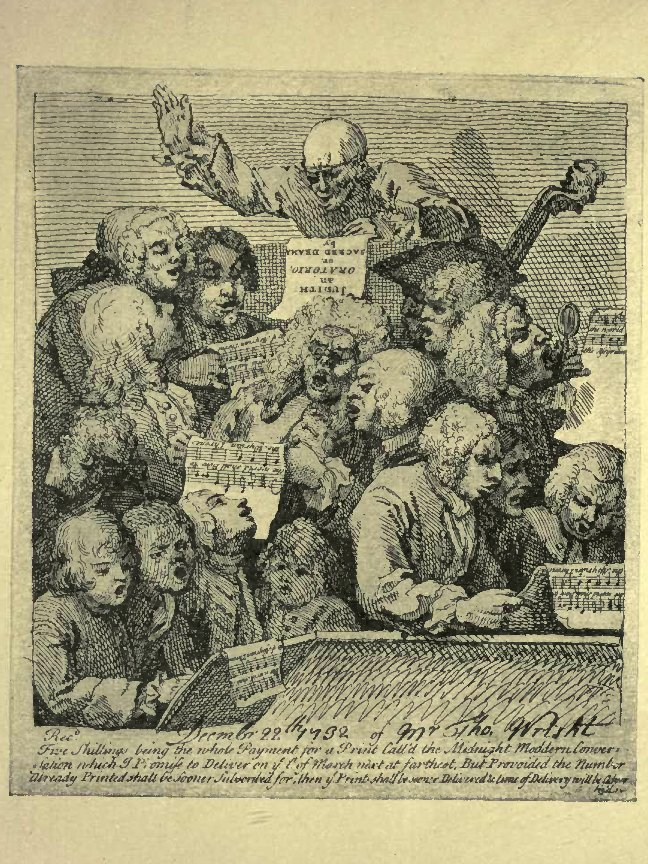
William Hogarth, 1732: Choral rehearsal for the oratorio Judith by Willem de Fesch

In the 1730s London theatre audiences were constantly clamouring for novelty and displays of virtuosity on the musical stage. Handel's Italian opera company had to compete with the full range of spoken drama as well as popular musical entertainment, including English ballad operas such as the highly successful Beggar's Opera and the pantomimes and burlesques produced by John Rich. Between 1732 and 1733 the composer Thomas Arne with his son and John Frederick Lampe briefly ran an English opera company devoted to full-length operas in the English language. Of these entertainments, Italian opera demanded the highest expenditure and posed the highest risks.

Between 1733 and 1737 these financial difficulties were brought to a head by the establishment of a new rival Italian opera company, the Opera of the Nobility, set up ruthlessly to court Handel's potential audience. Formed by members of the disbanded Royal Academy of Music, to which Handel had previously belonged, it succeeded in poaching almost all of his principal singers, including the celebrated castrato Senesino and the bass singer Antonio Montagnana. Whereas Handel's company was supported by the king George II and his wife, the Opera of the Nobility had the patronage of their son Frederick, Prince of Wales, an open sign of deep-seated disagreements within the royal family.

It was during the second season of rivalry in 1734–1735, when competition between the two companies had become fiercest, that Handel first introduced his organ concertos. By that stage the Opera of the Nobility had assembled a star-studded cast which now additionally included the castrato Farinelli and the soprano Francesca Cuzzoni. Performances of Hasse's Venetian opera Artaserse played to packed houses and Farinelli became the toast of the town. Later in the season they even revived one of Handel's own operas Ottone, albeit in a heavily bowdlerised form, again with Farinelli as a guaranteed audience drawer. Artaserse and other operas including Porpora's new opera Polifemo, a precursor of Handel's pastoral masque Acis and Galatea, vied for the audience of Handel's three new works – the operas Ariodante and Alcina, part of the trilogy based on Ariosto's romantic epic Orlando Furioso, and the oratorio Athalia.

=== Residency at Covent Garden ===
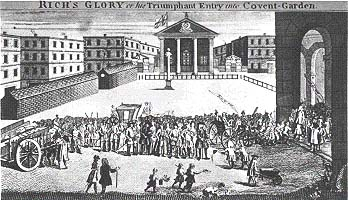
William Hogarth: "Rich's Glory", the first theatre in Covent Garden built in 1732 by John Rich

Handel's opera company was obliged to leave the King's Theatre after the 1733–1734 season, because of a lack of support from former directors of the Royal Academy of Music. In July 1734 his company took up residency in the Theatre Royal in Covent Garden, opened two years previously by John Rich. Handel was engaged to give two performances every week, usually on Wednesday and Saturday, during the season. During the first season 1734–1735 there were three important features of the company's artistic activities:

- a commitment to perform only music by Handel to satisfy his supporters rather than the fickle public who demanded pasticci of the latest Italian composers;
- full use of the resident chorus and dance company in Covent Garden, including the dancer Marie Sallé from the Paris Opera;
- an extended 6 week season of biblical oratorios building on the success of previous seasons.

All performances of the first season were advertised in the local newspapers as "By His Majesty's Command" or "By Her Majesty's Command" when the King was absent. The King and Queen attended a large number of performances, essentially snubbing the Opera of the Nobility supported by their son. In November and December 1734, Handel presented various opera revivals and a newly composed opera-ballet Terpsichore. However the combination of dance and opera seria was not sufficient to attract the opera going public. In January 1735 Ariodante opened, but, despite the quality of the music and a visible royal presence, was no more successful. It was in March that Handel started his first oratorio season, featuring the organ concertos HWV 290–293. The timing of the performances avoided conflicts with events in other London theatres and the local papers advertised the "new Concertos on the Organ." In spite of this his general popularity at that particular time was in such a state of decline, that even his organ concertos were "far from bringing him crowded audiences: tho' there were no publick Entertainments on those Evenings."

Handel fared better with his new opera Alcina which had an extended run, again with royal approval and attendance. There was, however, public disapproval of Marie Sallé's performance en travesti as Cupid in the ballet sections.

=== The Farinelli phenomenon ===
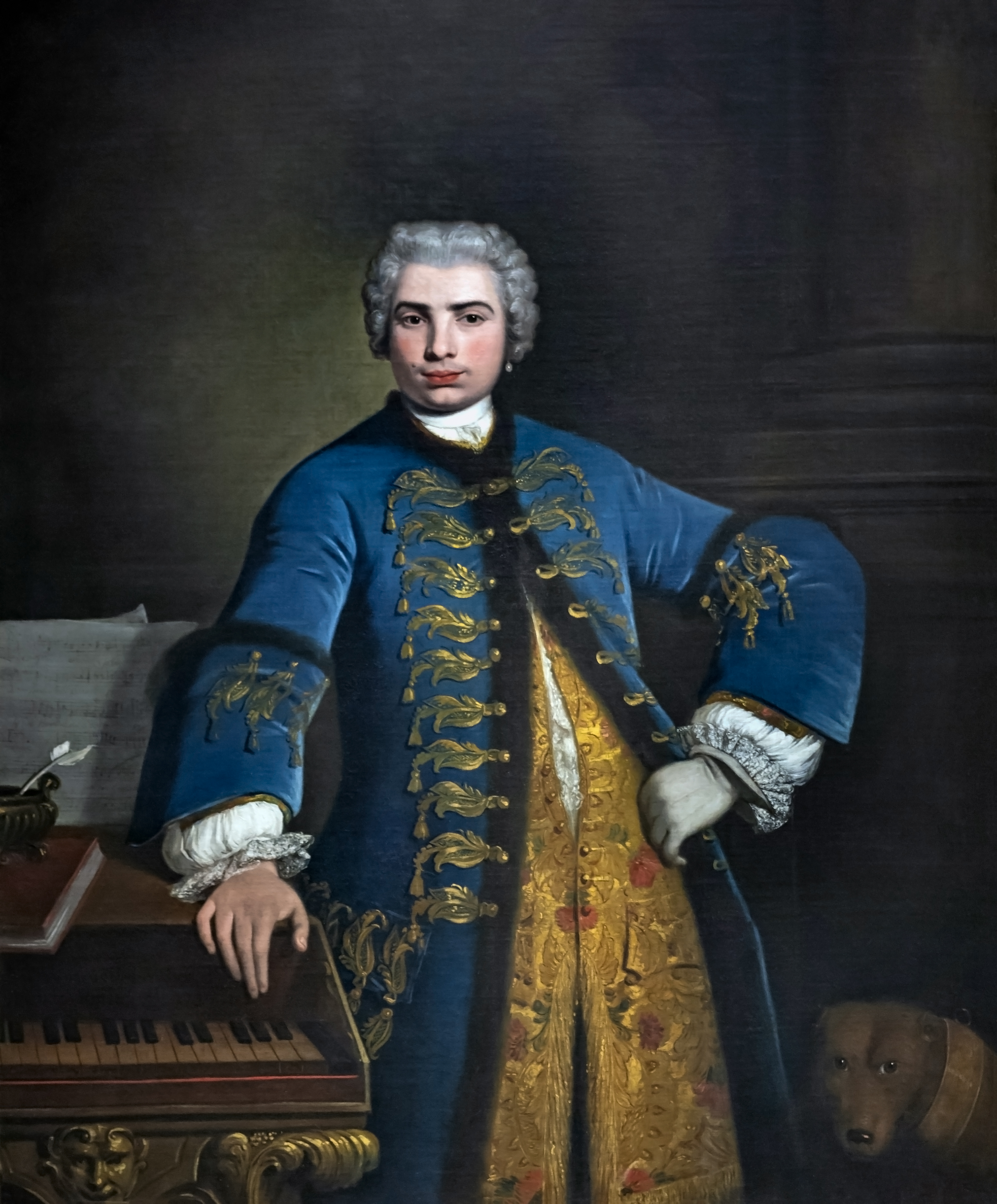
Farinelli – Bartolomeo Nazari 1734

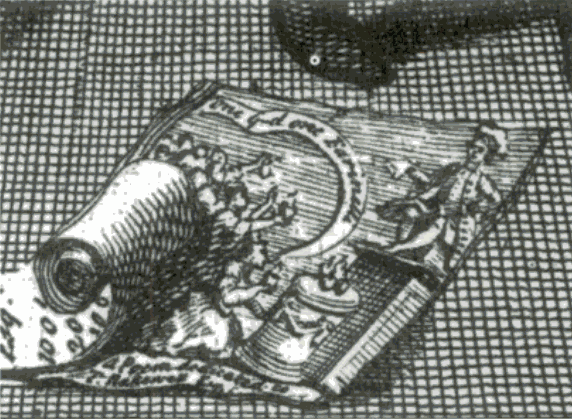
William Hogarth, Plate 2 of A Rake's Progress. Detail. 1735. The scrap of paper shows Farinelli on a raised dais, behind a burning altar. Women offer up their hearts under a banner bearing the legend. One God, One Farinelli.

Farinelli's impact on London opera-goers was without precedent: his singing gave rise to wild adulation verging on hysteria. Horace Walpole recorded that Lady Rich (1692–1773) expressed her rapture in 1735 with the words, "One God, One Farinelli."

Handel had unsuccessfully attempted to hire Farinelli for his own company during a visit to Venice in 1729, so impressed was he by his brilliant castrato voice. In London Farinelli continued to pull the crowds to the Opera of the Nobility, despite Handel's insertions in his operas of dance interludes by Marie Sallé, the leader of the resident dance troupe at Covent Garden.

In early 1735 the first performances of Ariodante took place. The sequel Alcina was completed soon afterwards. At the same time Handel was preparing revised versions of his oratorios Esther and Athalia. During this period Handel prepared the 16 movements of the four organ concertos HWV 290–293, of which 10 are reworkings of previous compositions with the remaining 6 largely newly composed. HWV 292, completed in March 1735, contains the most new material, although even there the ritornello of the first movement is a borrowing from Act 1 of Alcina. It featured in the April performances of Athalia at Covent Garden. The other concertos were first heard in March, HWV 290 and 291 in Esther and HWV 293 in Deborah.

=== Alexander's Feast ===
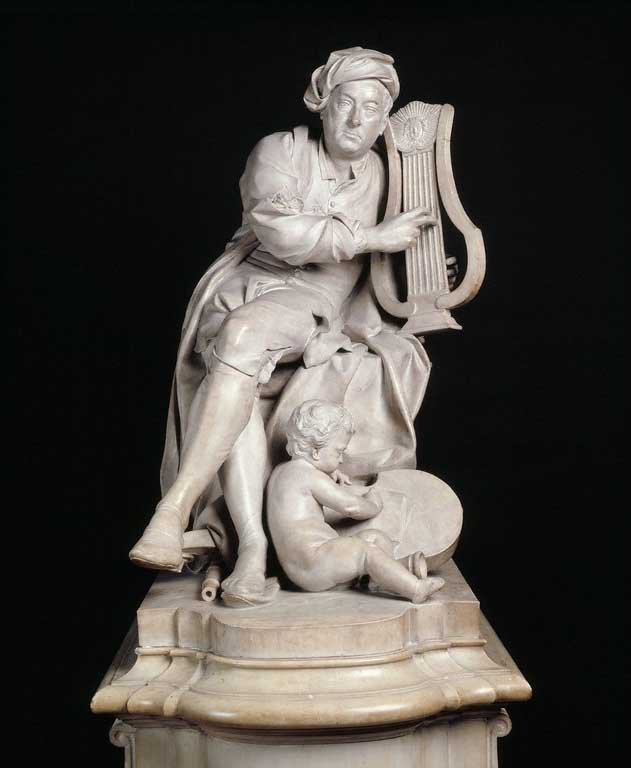
Roubiliac: Sculpture of Handel for Vauxhall Gardens. 1738, Victoria and Albert Museum. Under Handel's left arm is a leather bound copy of Alexander's Feast.

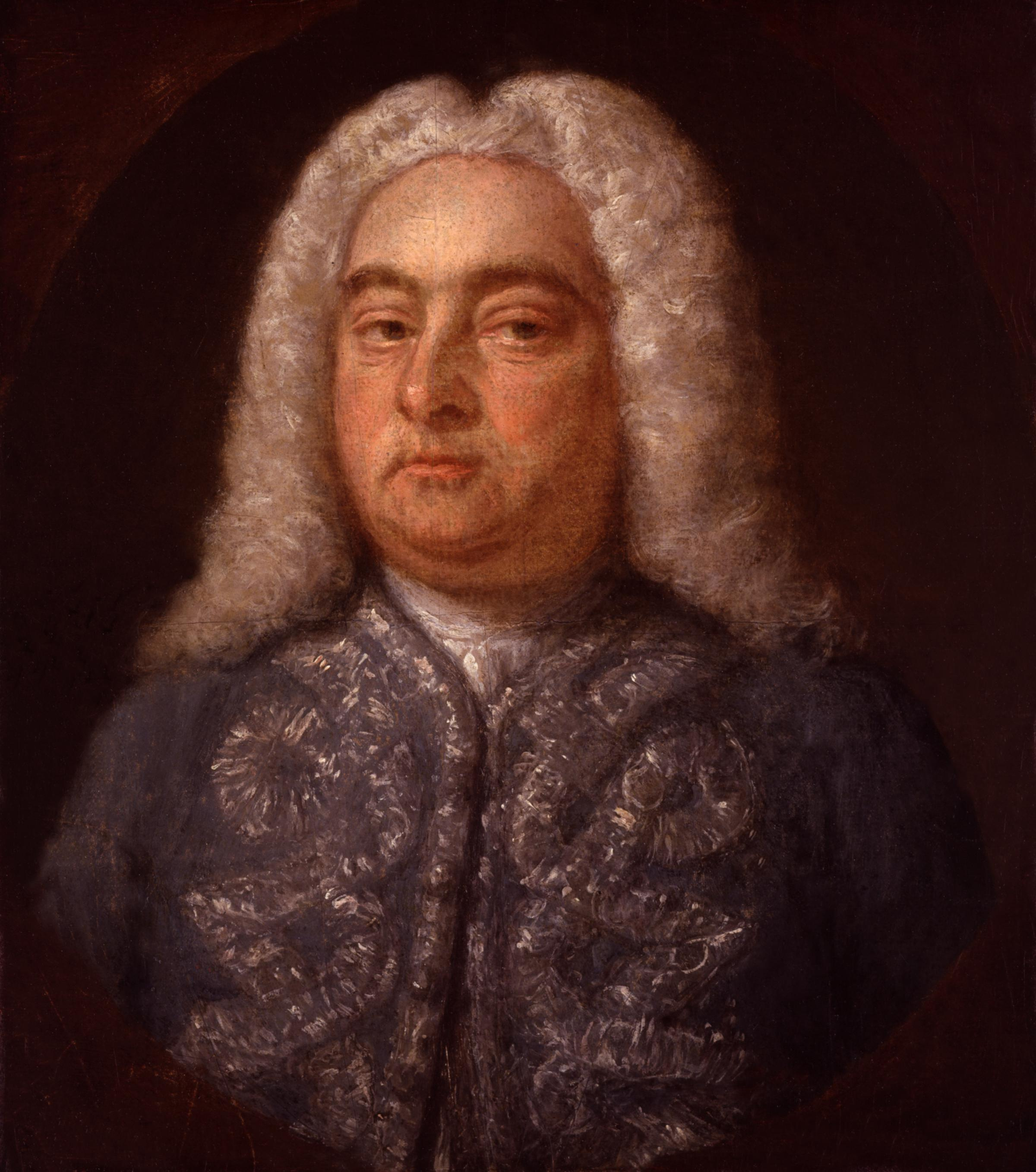
George Frederick Handel, by Francis Kyte (1742); National Portrait Gallery, London

Handel completed Alexander's Feast in January 1736. A choral work in two parts, it was a setting of the ode Alexander's Feast, or the Power of Musick by John Dryden. It was first performed at Covent Garden on 19 February 1736 as a celebration of Saint Cecilia, the patron saint of Music. In its original form it contained three concertos: a concerto in B♭ major in 3 movements for "Harp, Lute, Lyrichord and other Instruments" HWV 294 for performance after the recitative Timotheus, plac'd on high in Part I; a concerto grosso in C major in 4 movements for oboes, bassoon and strings, now known as the "Concerto in Alexander's Feast" HWV 318, performed between Parts I and II; and an organ concerto HWV 289 in G minor and major in 4 movements for chamber organ, oboes, bassoon and strings performed after the chorus Let old Timotheus yield the prize in Part II. There were 11 performances of the work in its first form: five in February and March 1736; and in 1737, 3 in March, 1 in early April and 2 in June. Meanwhile, he had produced Arminio and Giustino, completed Berenice, revived Partenope, and continued with Il Parnasso in Festa, Alexander's Feast, and the revised The Triumph of Time and Truth which premiered on March 23.

I was nearly an hour with Handel yesterday ... he is in no danger upon the whole but I fear or am rather too certain that he will lose a great part of his execution so as to prevent his ever playing any more concertos on the organ.

— Lord Shaftesbury, personal friend of Handel, 1737

In April Handel suffered a mild stroke, or rheumatic palsy, resulting in temporary paralysis in his right hand and arm. After brief signs of a recovery, he had a relapse in May, with an accompanying deterioration in his mental capacities. He had strong competition from John Frederick Lampe; The Dragon of Wantley was first performed at the Little Theatre in the Haymarket in London on May 16, 1737. It was a parody of the Italian opera seria. In Autumn 1737 the fatigued Handel reluctantly followed the advice of his physicians and went to take the cure in the spa towns of Royal Tunbridge Wells, Aix-la-Chapelle (Burtscheid) in September. All the symptoms of his "disorder" vanished by November, although there were to be recurrences of the condition in 1743 and 1745. On Christmas Eve Handel finished the score of Faramondo, but its composition was interrupted by that of the Funeral Anthem for Queen Caroline. On Boxing Day he began the composition of Serse, the only comic opera that Handel ever wrote and worked with Elisabeth Duparc.

The harp and organ concerto (HWV 294) and Alexander's Feast were published in 1738 by John Walsh. Alexander's Feast was performed 25 times in Handel's lifetime and revised in 1739, 1742 and 1751, with the suppression of the two concertos Op. 4. For the final performances in 1753, Handel could not himself perform because of his failing eyesight. The Countess of Shaftesbury relates that she saw "the great though unhappy Handel, dejected, wan and dark, sitting by, not playing the harpsichord." No one seems to have noticed hitherto that Handel's "borrowings" began in 1736 on a small scale, and became more frequent in 1737, after which they developed into a regular habit.

== Works ==
| HWV | Opus | Key | Composed | Premiere | Published | Movements | Notes |
|---|---|---|---|---|---|---|---|
| 289 | Op. 4, No. 1 | G minor / G major | 1735–1736 | 19 February 1736 | 1738 | Larghetto e staccato – Allegro – Adagio – Andante | First performed with "Alexander's Feast" (HWV 75) |
| 290 | Op. 4, No. 2 | B♭ major | 1735 | 5 March 1735 | 1738 | A tempo ordinario e staccato – Allegro – Adagio e staccato – Allegro, ma non presto | First performed with the oratorio "Esther" (HWV 50b) |
| 291 | Op. 4, No. 3 | G minor | 1735 | 5 March 1735 | 1738 | Adagio – Allegro – Adagio –Allegro | Variant versions of last movement. First performed with the oratorio "Esther" (HWV 50b) |
| 292 | Op. 4, No. 4 | F major | 25 March 1735 | 1 April 1735 | 1738 | Allegro – Andante – Adagio – Allegro | Originally concluded with 'Alleluja' chorus (HG 20, p. 161), short instrumental ending probably written by Handel for Walsh publication. First performed with "Athalia" (HWV 52) |
| 293 | Op. 4, No. 5 | F major | 1735 | 26 March 1735 | 1738 | Larghetto – Allegro – Alla Siciliana – Presto | Performed with revival of "Deborah" (HWV 51) |
| 294 | Op. 4, No. 6 | B♭ major | 1736 | 19 February 1736 | 1738 | Andante allegro – Larghetto – Allegro moderato | First performed with "Alexander's Feast" (HWV 75). Originally composed for harp, but later arranged for organ |

== Self-borrowings ==
- HWV 289 – The last movement is a minuet and variations expanded from the Trio Sonata in F, Op. 5, No. 6.
- HWV 290 – The first movement is an expanded version of the symphonia from the Motet Silete Venti for soprano. The first allegro uses material from the Trio Sonata, Op. 2, No. 4.
- HWV 291 – This uses material from the Trio Sonata, Op. 2, No. 6, the Recorder Sonata, Op. 1, No. 2 and an early oboe concerto. The introductory bars of the first movement use material from the Concerto Grosso, Op. 3, No. 3.
- HWV 292 – A large part of the first movement is derived from the introduction to the second version of the chorus Questo è il cielo from Act I of Alcina.
- HWV 293 – This is a close transcription of the Recorder Sonata, Op. 1, No. 11.
- HWV 294 – This has no borrowings.

== Characteristics ==
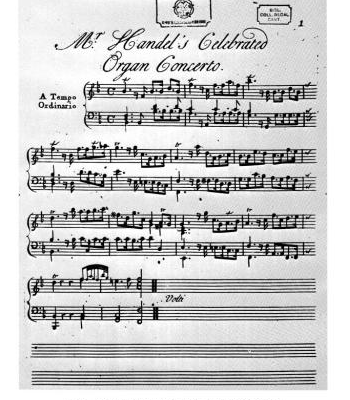
Title page of Walsh's arrangement of Op. 4, No. 2, HWV 290

=== Concertos for biblical oratorios (1735) ===
- HWV 290 – This concerto in B♭ recalls the style of Handel's first compositions in England. However, despite the seemingly conventional semiquaver figurations for organ, Handel's maturity and inventiveness are apparent in the unexpected rhythmic subtleties and suspensions of the ritornellos. As Basil Lam has commented, these are the musical counterpart of the unexpected overrunning of the beat in the couplets of the poet John Dryden, Handel's contemporary. Similarities did not end there: both reacted similarly to criticism. Handel is quoted as saying at Vauxhall Gardens, "You are right sir, it is very poor stuff; I thought so when I wrote it"; while Dryden remarked of some of his lines from a play, "I knew they were bad enough to please, even when I wrote them."
- HWV 291 – The solo violin and violoncello parts in the first movement are partly adaptations of the solo parts in the original trio sonata on which this concerto in G minor is based.
- HWV 292 – This concerto in F is essentially in three movements, like Bach's concertos for solo instruments: the short adagio in D minor serves as a link between the second movement and the fugal finale. The andante is delicately scored for pianissimo strings senza cembalo (without harpsichord) with three stops on the organ—open diapason, stopped diapason and flute—another indication that these concertos were intimate chamber works.
- HWV 293 – This is a faithful transcription of the recorder sonata, Op. 1, No. 11, very reminiscent of the style of Arcangelo Corelli.

=== Concertos for 'Alexander's Feast' (1736) ===
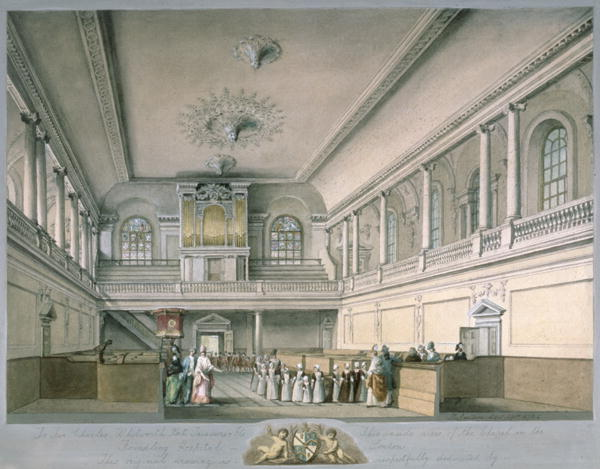
Watercolour by John Sanders, 1773. The Foundling Hospital Chapel looking west, showing the organ, built by Thomas Parker, donated by Handel in 1749.

- HWV 289 – This concerto in G minor and major is a chamber work of "flawless lucidity and grace". The opening stately larghetto in G minor has two different ritornello themes for organ and strings marked forte, with ornamented piano responses from the organ, like the solo voice in an operatic aria. Its unconventional free form and solemn mood are forward looking, with elements that prefigure the slow movements of Beethoven's piano concertos. The following allegro in G major has brilliant virtuosic semiquaver passages for the organ, punctuated by orchestral tuttis, each reprise of the three part imitative ritornello offering a surprise. A short adagio in E minor leads into a delicately scored minuet in G major with two variations. The echo responses of the upper strings are marked piano or pianissimo and the organ is sometimes accompanied only by a continuo.
- HWV 294 – This concerto in B♭ major was originally written for the Welsh harpist William Powell for performance in Alexander's Feast. In three movements, it reflects Handel's early style. It is scored for harp and/or organ, strings and two alto recorders.

== Editions ==
The concertos were first published in 1738 by John Walsh for solo keyboard, the solo part combined with a simplified reduction of the orchestral accompaniment. In the nineteenth century, W. T. Best, the Victorian Handelian champion and frequent performer at Crystal Palace, popularized a version for large solo two manual organ with pedals, with his own lengthy romantic candenzas. Subsequent scholarship and performance practice, however, has favoured the original intimate scoring for chamber organ and small baroque orchestra. In the 1940s the blind organist Helmut Walcha prepared a version for organ and second keyboard giving one possible ornamentation and extemporisitation of the organ part in the slow movements. Modern performing editions of Walsh's 1738 solo keyboard version and the original scoring for organ and orchestra have been prepared by the musicologists William Gudger and Terence Best.

== Discography ==
The concertos have been recorded by multiple organists. Notable versions include:

- Handel Organ Concertos, Op. 4, The English Concert, Simon Preston (organ), Trevor Pinnock (conductor), Archiv Produktion, 1984
- Handel Organ Concertos, Op. 4, Academy of Ancient Music, Richard Egarr (organ), Harmonia Mundi, HMU 807446, 2008 (Midem awards winner, concerto section, 2008)

== See also ==
- Handel organ concertos, Op. 7
- List of concertos by George Frideric Handel
