= All Saints' Church, Oakham =

Church in Rutland, England

Coordinates: 52°40′16″N 00°43′43″W

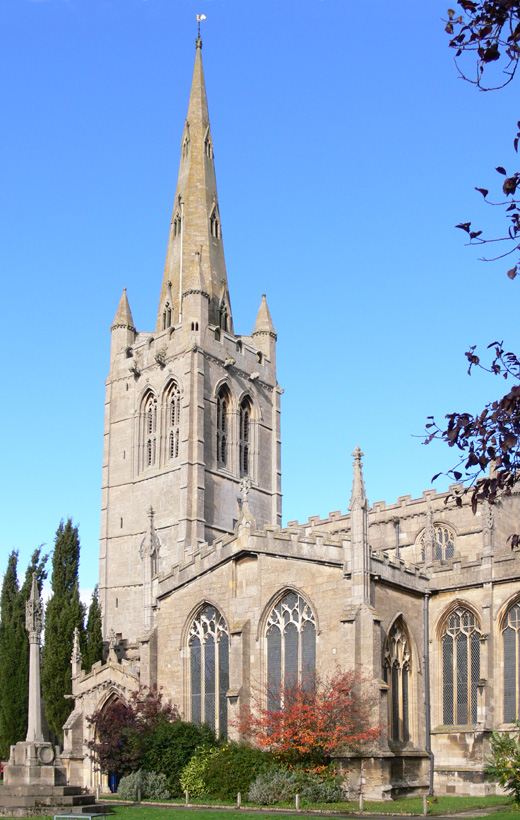
- All Saints' Church from the footpath between Church Street and Market Place
- All Saints' Church, Oakham
- Denomination: Church of England
- Churchmanship: Broad Church / Central
- Website: oakhamteam.org.uk

History
- Dedication: All Saints

Administration
- Province: Province of Canterbury
- Diocese: Diocese of Peterborough
- Archdeaconry: Archdeaconry of Oakham
- Deanery: Rutland
- Parish: Oakham

Clergy
- Vicar: Revd Stephen Griffiths

All Saints' Church, Oakham is a parish church in the Church of England in Oakham, Rutland. It is Grade I listed.

== History ==
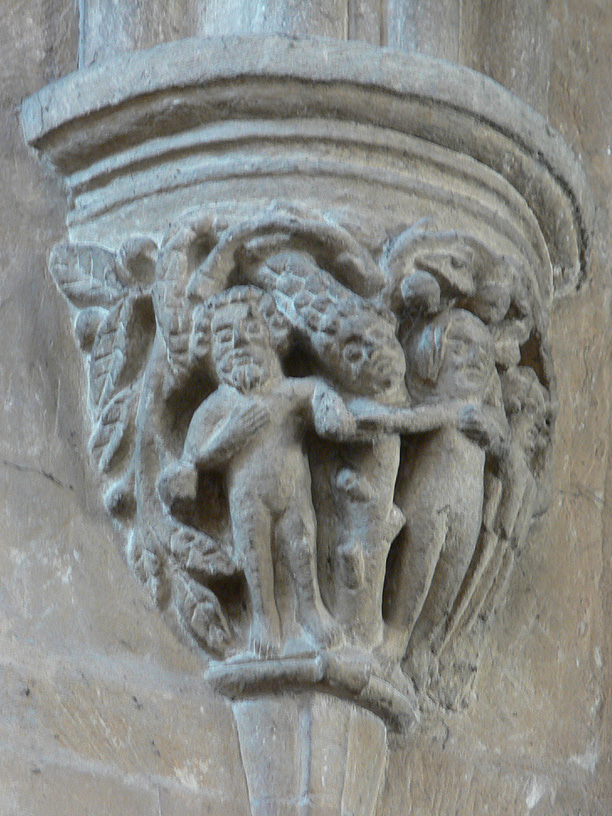
Early 14th-century stonecarving of Adam and Eve in the Garden of Eden

The spire of Oakham parish church dominates distant views of the town for several miles in all directions. The impressive west tower and spire, built during the 14th century in the Decorated Gothic style, are slightly earlier in date than most of the rest of the exterior of the building, which (apart from some Victorian restoration) is in the Perpendicular style. Oddly, the south doorway and its porch seem to be the oldest parts of the church, the doorway probably dating from the early 13th century with the porch having been added later that century.

In the light, spacious interior there is more evidence of the mature Decorated style of the 14th century. The tall, slender columns of the nave have intricately carved capitals showing animals, birds, figures, foliage and scenes from the Bible including Adam and Eve, the Expulsion from the Garden of Eden, the Annunciation and the Coronation of the Virgin Mary. There is also a fine Green Man.

The church was restored in 1857 to 1858 by Sir George Gilbert Scott. It is a Grade I listed building.

== Bells ==
During the church restoration in 1858 the first stage of the tower was fitted with a new ringing floor and the bells were rehung in a new oak frame. Two bells were re-cast by Mears of London.

There is a ring of eight bells cast by Gillett & Johnston in 1910, and a priest's bell of 1840.

On 9 December 1923 the tenor bell broke loose from the headstock but was captured in the bell frame and did not penetrate into the ringing room. The bell frame was still in a poor condition in 1937 which prevented it being used to ring for the coronation of King George VI.

== Organ ==
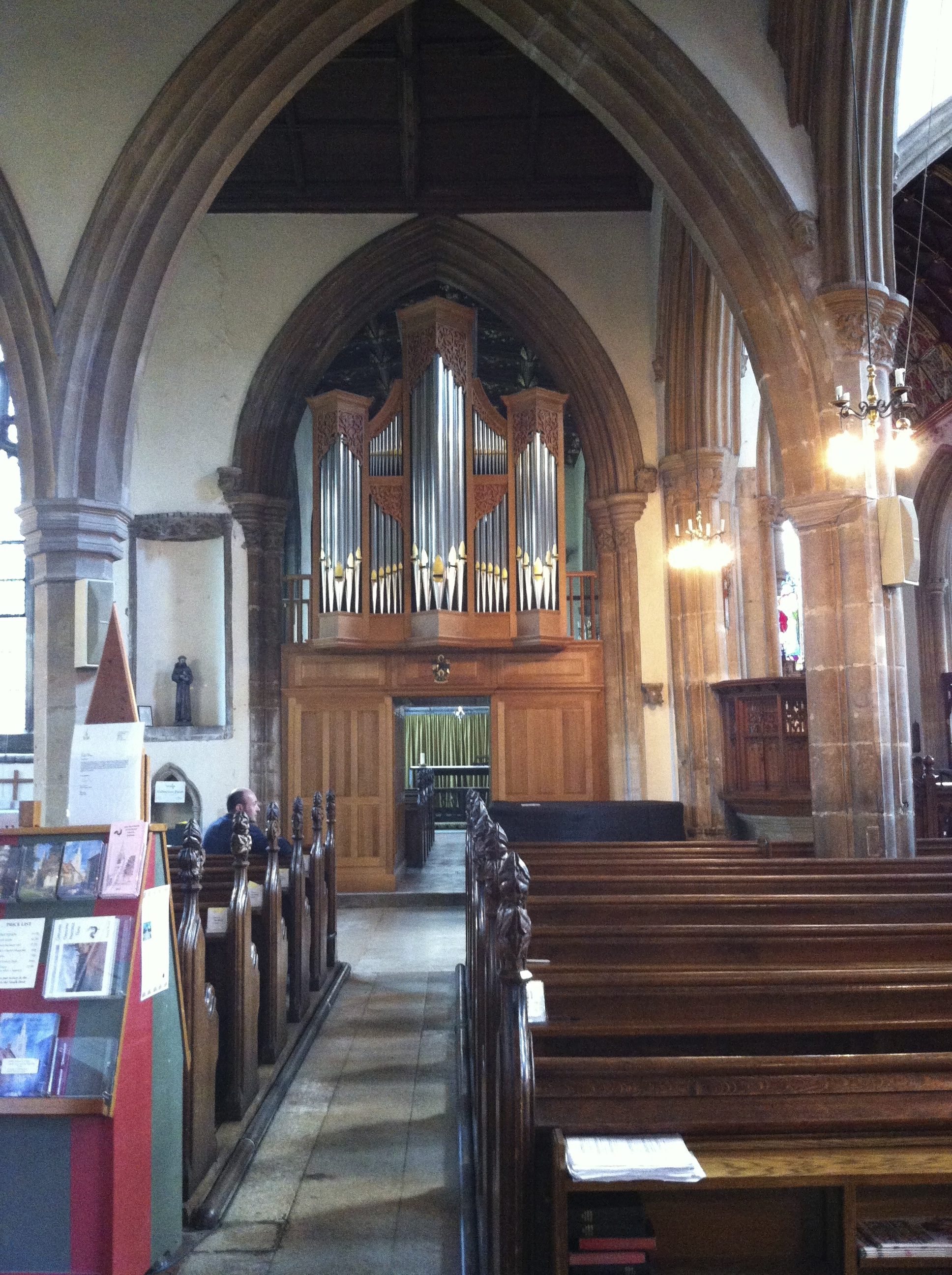
Organ by Kenneth Tickell from 1996

An organ by Brindley & Foster was installed in 1872 in the Lady Chapel at a cost of £750 (equivalent to £73,326 in 2025). It was enlarged in 1896. In 1937, Roger Yates improved and electrified it, and moved it to the north west corner of the Church, with the console in the Trinity Chapel. This organ was removed in 1994.

The new two manual pipe organ dates from 1996 and is by the builder Kenneth Tickell and Company. A specification of the organ can be found on the National Pipe Organ Register.

=== Organists ===
- Mr. Gadsby 1872–
- Henry Nicholson 1877–1922
- John Barham Johnson 1923–1925
- George Newell 1925–1927
- George F. Austin 1927
- A.H. Allsop 1927–1930
- Victor Brook 1930–1932
- John Dalby 1932–1936
- Stanley Nolan 1939 – ????
- Russell Arthur Missin 1950–1956 (later organist of Newcastle Cathedral).
- Derek Thomas 1958–1984
- Ivan Linford 1996–1999
- Kevin Slingsby 2005–2021
- Dr. August Guan 2021–2023 (later sub-organist of Brecon Cathedral)
- Harry Jacques 2023–

== Parish library ==
The church housed a library of books donated by Anne Harington of Exton Hall in 1616. The books had belonged to her son John Harington, 2nd Baron Harington, who died of smallpox aged 22. The library was for the use of the parish priest and was added to over the years. The remaining collection was transferred to Manuscripts and Special Collections at the University of Nottingham in 1980. Of the 150 volumes, about 70 are part of the original Harington bequest. Most of these are in Latin and a small number in Greek, and were printed in Europe. They, along with the rest of the library collection, primarily relate to theology, canon law, and church history.

== Parish status ==
Oakham Parish Church is in a team ministry with:

- St Andrew's Church, Hambleton
- St Edmund's Church, Egleton
- All Saints' Church, Braunston-in-Rutland
- St Peter's Church, Brooke, Rutland
- Church of St Peter and St Paul, Langham
- St Andrew's Church, Whissendine
- Holy Trinity Church, Teigh
- St Mary's Church, Ashwell, Rutland
- Church of St Peter and St Paul, Market Overton

== Gallery ==
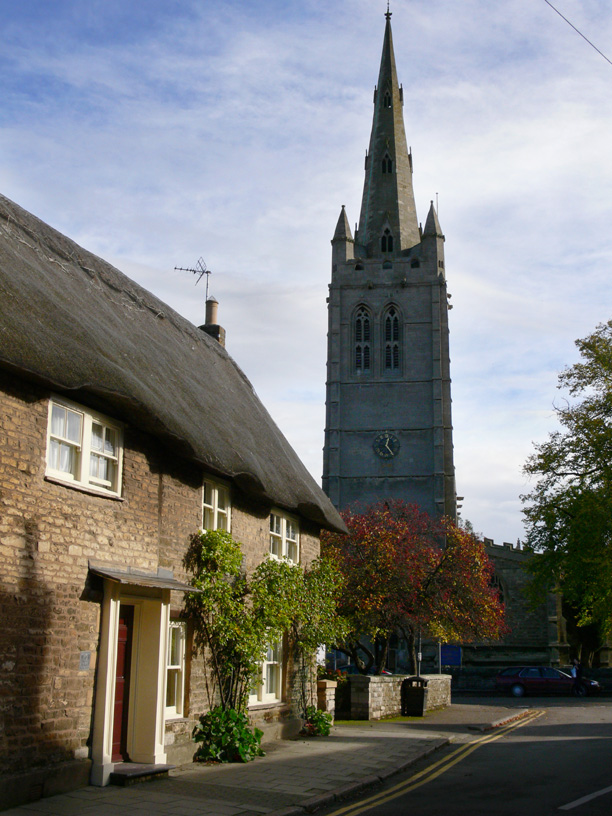
All Saints' Church seen from Northgate

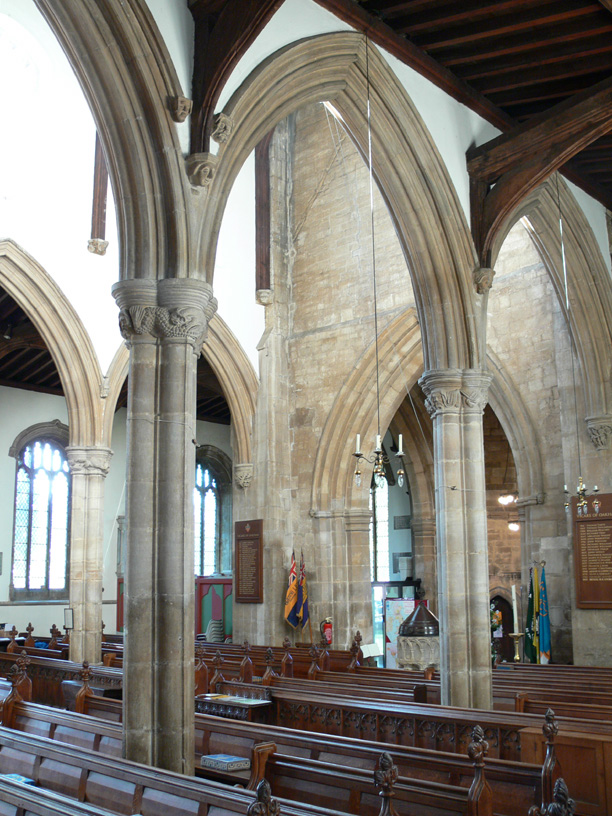
Interior of All Saints' Church; view from north aisle looking southwest towards font

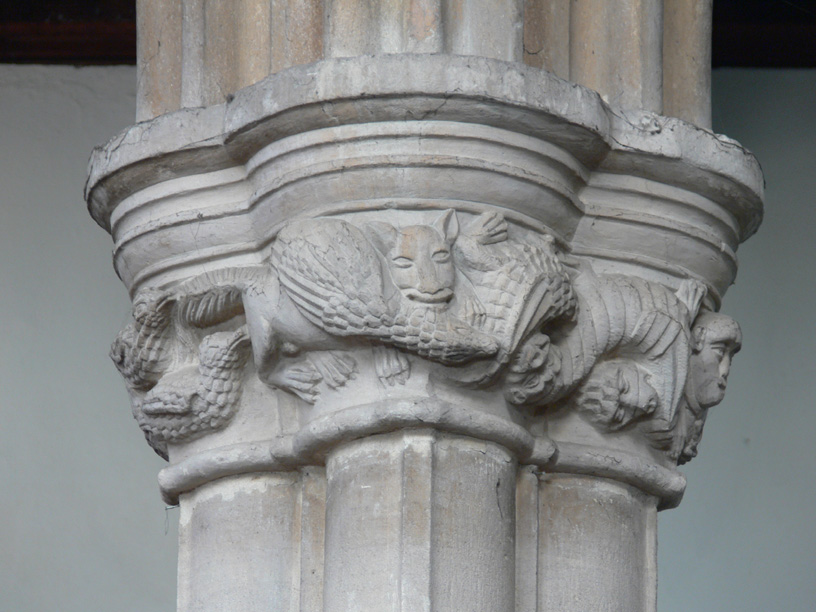
Early 14th-century capital, showing fox and geese and other creatures

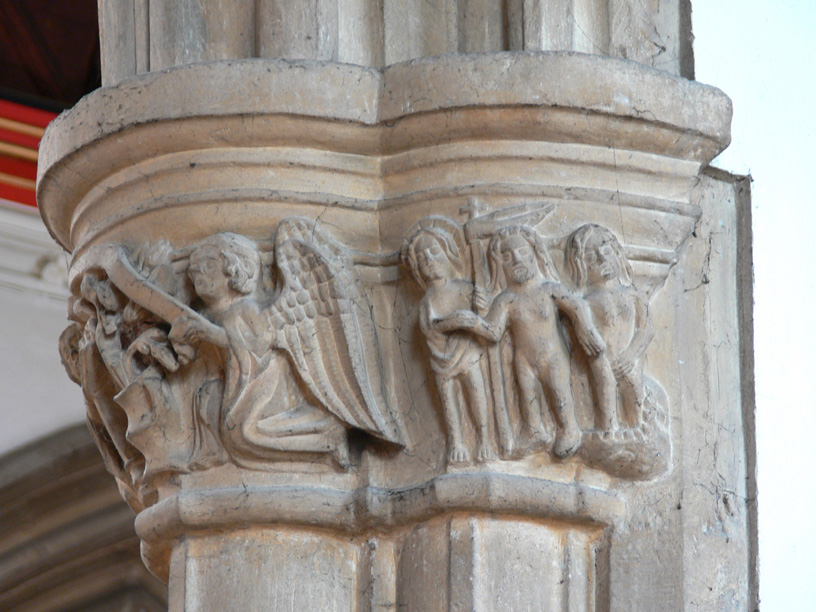
Early 14th-century capital, showing the Angel Gabriel (part of the Annunciation scene) (left), and Adam and Eve between Christ and the Jaws of Hell (right)

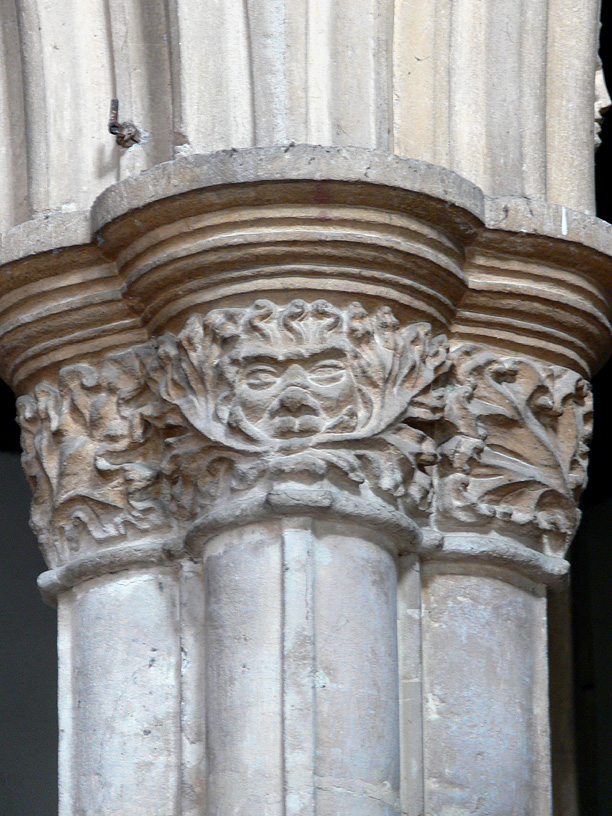
Early 14th-century capital, showing a Green Man
