= Russell Arthur Missin =

- Born: 15 July 1922; Wisbech, Cambridgeshire, England
- Died: 28 November 2002 (aged 80)
- Genres: Choral music
- Occupation: Church organist
- Instrument: Organ

Russell Arthur Missin (15 July 1922 – 28 November 2002) was an English cathedral organist, who served in Newcastle Cathedral.

== Background ==
He was born in Wisbech, Cambridgeshire on 15 July 1922. Missin's parents lived in a small village, Gorefield just outside Wisbech. He was awarded his FRCO CHM in 1947 and took a Doctor in Theology (Church Music) degree from Geneva Theological College, America. He also held the A.D.C.M. (Archbishop of Canterbury's Diploma in Church Music).

He was married to Muriel, and they had two sons. His ashes are interred in the churchyard at St Paul’s Church, Gorefield, Wisbech.

== Career ==
Assistant organist at Ely Cathedral 1945 - 1949

Organist of:

- St Mary's Church, Thetford
- St Giles, Cambridge
- Holbeach Parish Church
- All Saints' Church, Oakham 1950 - 1956
- St. Mary's Church, Nottingham 1957 – 1967
- Newcastle Cathedral 1967 – 1987
- Christ Church, North Shields 1989 - 1999

Cultural offices
| Preceded by David Lumsden | Organist and Master of the Choristers of St. Mary's Church, Nottingham; 1957-1967 | Succeeded by David Sheeran Butterworth |
| Preceded by Colin Ross | Organist and Master of the Choristers of Newcastle Cathedral; 1967-1987 | Succeeded by Timothy Hone |
