= Colin Ross (composer) =

Colin Archibald Campbell Ross (1911–1993) FRCO was an organist, pianist, conductor and composer.

== Biography ==
Colin Ross was born in 1911 in Brecon, of Scottish ancestry, the younger son of Archibald Campbell Carne Ross, of Penzance and Brecon, a stockbroker; his elder brother was the linguist Alan S. C. Ross. His organ teacher was J.H.Carden, organist of Brecon Cathedral, whose articled pupil he became at the age of sixteen. In 1930 he moved to Hereford to be articled pupil to Sir Percy Hull at Hereford Cathedral, and in 1935 he was made assistant organist there. He was the first person to hold such a role. It was while at Hereford that Ross met and married his wife Leila Hodges in 1939, according to amateur research by 'The Artful Dodger'. The couple later had one daughter, Alison. In 1940 he was called up and became a private in the British army. After discharge he went to the Royal Academy of Music in London to study conducting and composition. After a number of appointments, including at St Barnabas', Tunbridge Wells, he was appointed organist and choir master of St Paul's Cathedral in Melbourne, Australia, which he held from 1947 to 1951. This appointment was on the recommendation of Sir William McKie, who was organist at Westminster Abbey. In 1951 he returned to England, having gained a number of organist's jobs in London, Tunbridge Wells, and Worth in East Sussex, before moving to Newcastle Upon Tyne to become organist and choirmaster at Cathedral Church of St Nicholas in 1955. In 1966 he moved to Worthing in West Sussex to take up the post of music teacher at the Boys' High School where he stayed for two years. In 1972 he joined the staff of Chichester College of Further Education. Ross died in February 1993.

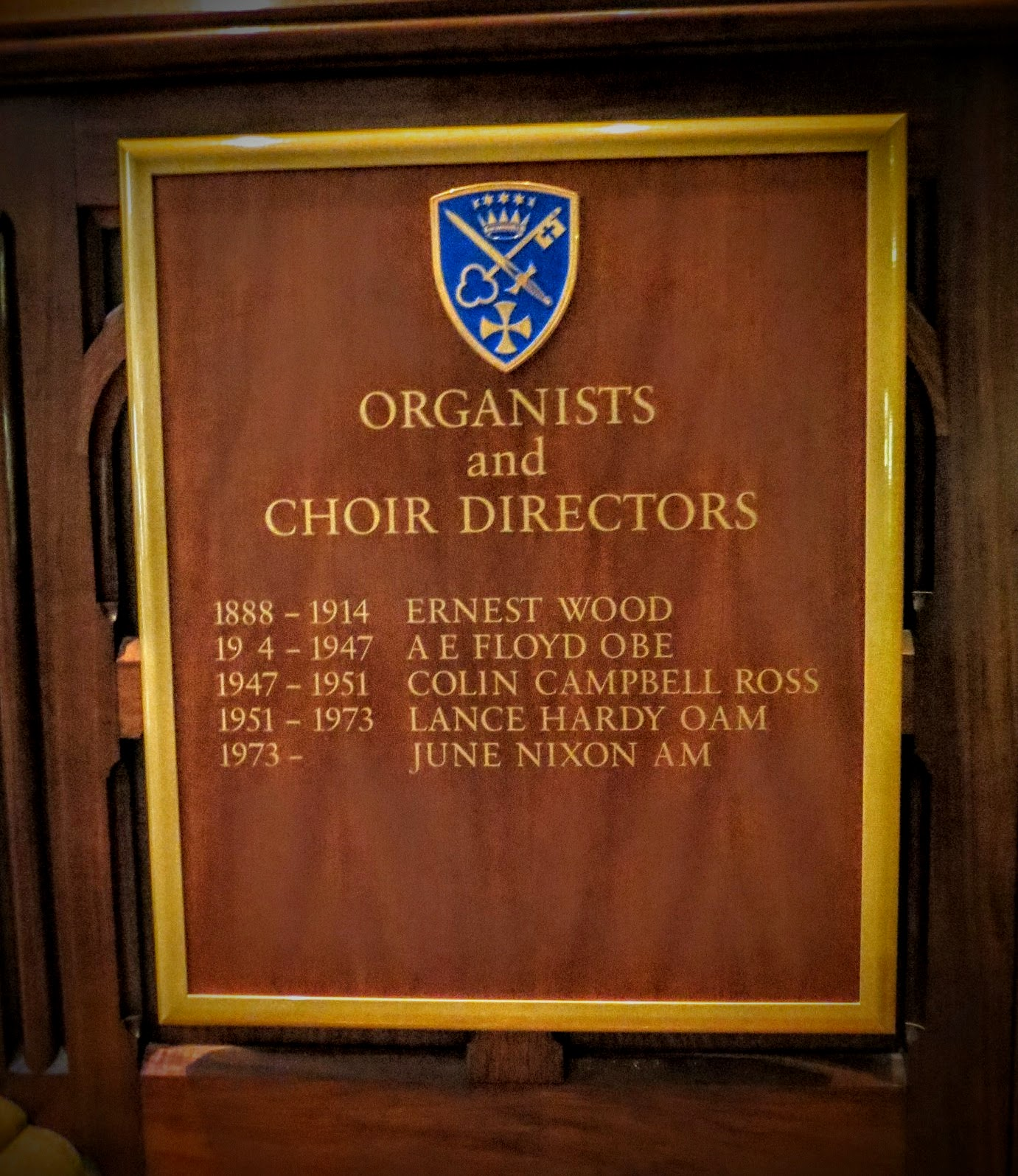
List of Organists and Choir Directors at Melbourne Cathedral, Australia.

== Selected Compositions ==
- Ostinato, Op. 15 (1937)
- "Gently the Breeze Blows" (1977), with words by Madeline Chase, for two voices with piano accompaniment

For solo voice with piano accompaniment:

- "Song of the Bells", with words by Katherine Wamen.
- "Into my heart" (1934), with words by A. E. Housman.
- "From far, from eve" (1934), with words by A. E. Housman.
- "Lorna's Song" (1937), with words by R. D. Blackmore
- "The Cherry Hung with Snow", with words by A. E. Housman. (Published sheet music is dated 1963, but Melbourne University Library lists 'The Cherry' by Colin Ross from 1934.)
- "Ode" (1985), with words translated by Soame Jenyns from Chinese.
- The Invaders, for unison choir (1934)
- Ave Maria, for SSAA choir
- Improvisation on the Chorale 'Ich ruf zu dir' (I call to Thee) for organ
- Miniature suite for treble recorder, flute, or oboe & piano (1986)
- Prelude for Piano (1986)
- "Let This Mind Be In You" Anthem ( pub: Curwen) (1964)
- "Scenes from the Song of Hiawatha" with words by Longfellow, for chorus, orchestra and soloists.

Cultural offices
Preceded by Kenneth Malcolmson	Organist and Master of the Choristers of Newcastle Cathedral; 1955–1967	Succeeded by Russell Missin
