= Timotheus (aulist) =

4th-century BC Greek musician

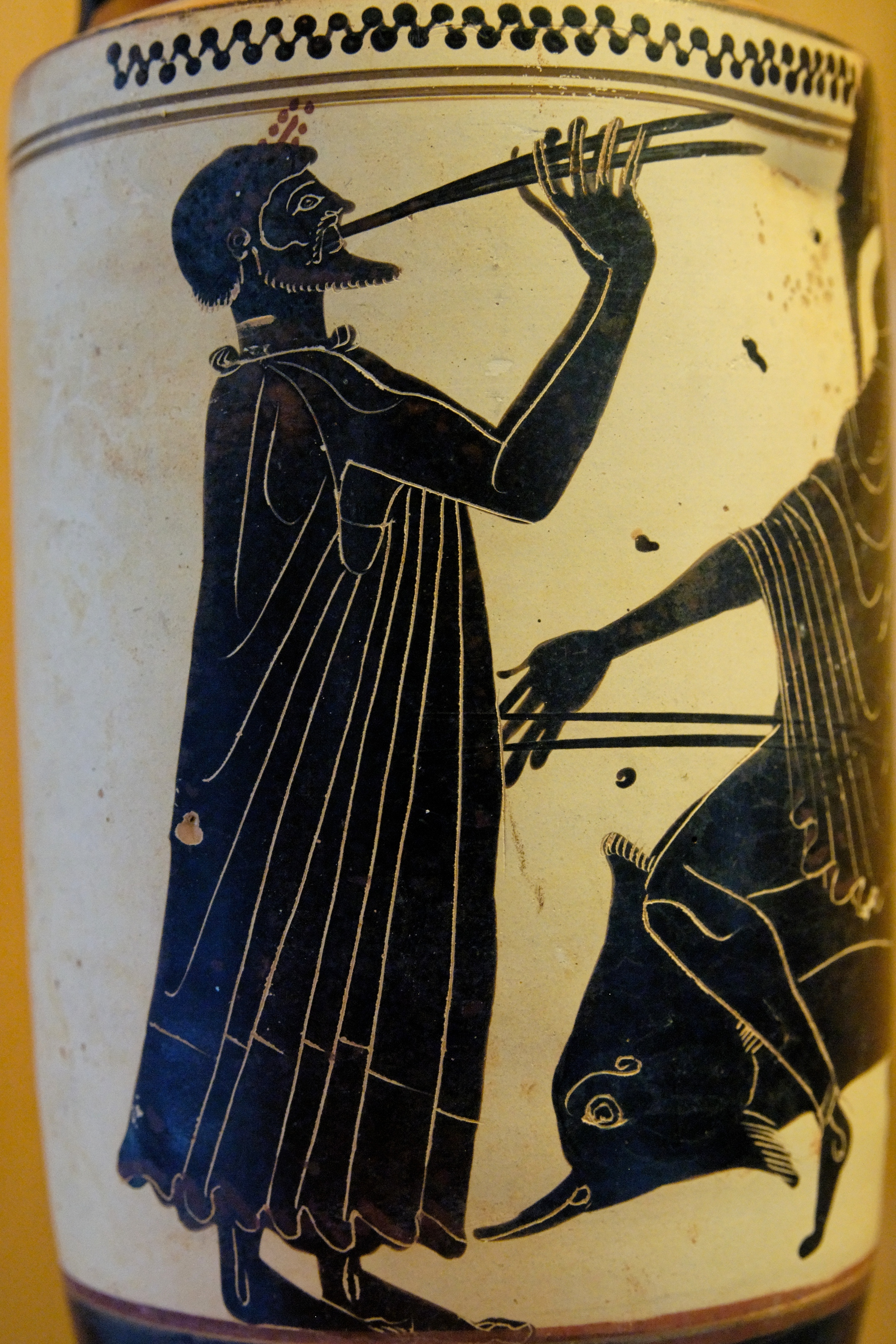
- a black figure vase depicting an aulos player.

Background information
- Genres: Ancient Greek music
- Occupation: soloist
- Instrument: Aulos
- Years active: 350s - 320s BC

Timotheus (Greek: Τιμόθεος) was a famous aulos player from Thebes, who flourished in Macedon during the reigns of Philip II and Alexander the Great. He later accompanied Alexander in his campaigns. After his death, a story about the effect of his music on Alexander became a familiar reference point in literature on the power of music to influence emotion.

== Life ==
According to Didymus, Timotheus was the son of Oeniades. He participated in musical competitions under Philip. When Philip lost an eye after Timotheus and others had performed a flute song about the cyclops, this was interpreted as an omen. Athenaeus says that Timotheus was noted for his long beard.

According to Suda, a later Byzantine source, Timotheus excited the young Alexander so much with a battle hymn to Athena that he jumped from his seat and grabbed his weapons ready to fight, declaring that the music was kingly. Timotheus was apparently using the "steep-rising" style.

Timotheus joined Alexander in Memphis, Egypt where he took part in the musical competitions held there. He also performed at the mass-marriage organised by Alexander in Susa in 324.

== In literature ==
=== Ancient ===
He is the principal figure in Lucian's dialogue Harmonides, in which Timotheus discusses musicianship with Harmonides, a pupil of his. Harmonides wants to achieve fame. Timotheus advises him to impress the experts within his profession rather than seek popular approval in big public venues. If leading musicians admire him, popular approval will follow.

Dio Chrysostom, in a speech on ideal kingship addressed to Trajan, refers to the story of how Timotheus' music inspired martial thoughts in Alexander. For Chrysostom, Timotheus's skill was in "adapting his playing to the king's character by selecting a piece that was not languishing or slow nor of the kind that would cause relaxation or listlessness, but rather, I fancy, the ringing strain which bears Athena's name and none other." Other rulers, such as Sardanapalus who was of languid temperament, would not have responded to such music, but being of a highly volatile nature, Alexander did.

Quintilian reports that "Timotheus is said to have demanded from those who had previously been under another master a fee double the amount which he charged for those who came to him untaught."

=== Modern ===
In later literature Timotheus the flautist is sometimes confused with the famous Macedonian singer, poet and lyre player Timotheus of Miletus. In fact Timotheus of Miletus lived earlier, during the reign of Archelaus I of Macedon.

The Renaissance music theorist Vincenzo Galilei refers to the story that Timotheus aroused Alexander's passions with his music. Galilei suggests that Timotheus must have acted out the feelings he was conveying during his performance,

When he roused the great Alexander with the difficult mode of Minerva [Athena] to combat with the armies of his foes, not only did the circumstances mentioned reveal themselves in the rhythms, the words and the conceptions in the entire song in conformity with his desire, but in my opinion at least, his habit, the aspect of his countenance and each particular gesture and member must have shown on this occasion that he was burning with desire to fight, to overcome and conquer the enemy. For this reason Alexander was forced to cry out for his arms and to say that this should be the song of kings.

Timotheus's apparent ability to manipulate Alexander's emotions through music is also the subject of John Dryden's poem "Alexander's Feast, or the Power of Music", later set to music by Handel. However, the portrayal of the musician singing and playing the lyre fits the earlier Timotheus. Dryden appears to merge the two, referring to "his breathing flute / And sounding lyre". He is also mentioned in Alexander Pope's poem An Essay on Criticism, in which "Timotheus' varied lays surprise", so that "the world's Victor stood subdued by sound."
