= Robert Quinney =

English musician (born 1976)

Robert Quinney (born 1976 in Nottingham, England) is Director of the Choir of New College, Oxford, and was formerly Sub-Organist at Westminster Abbey and Director of Music at Peterborough Cathedral. In addition to his work at New College, he has a freelance career as soloist, ensemble player, and writer on music. From October 2009 till 2014 he was Director of Oundle for Organists, whose residential courses provide tuition for young organists.

In 2002, Quinney was named Royal College of Organists Performer of the Year.

== Education and early career ==
Robert Quinney was born in Nottingham and was a chorister at Dundee Cathedral and then at All Saints Church, Ecclesall, where he learned to play the organ.

He attended Silverdale School and then received a sixth-form full academic scholarship to Eton College, which Eton offers to pupils from state schools. On leaving Eton he spent a year as organ scholar of Winchester Cathedral and Assistant Organist of Winchester College. He was then organ scholar at King's College, Cambridge from 1995 to 1998.

On graduating from Cambridge (with BA and M.Phil. degrees) Quinney became Acting Sub-Organist of Westminster Abbey.

== Career at Westminster ==
After a year as Acting Sub Organist at Westminster Abbey, Robert Quinney moved to Westminster Cathedral as Assistant Master of Music in September 2000. In addition to daily work with Westminster Cathedral Choir, he organised and gave many of the Cathedral's recitals. In 2001, he became the fourth organist to play the monumental Passion Symphony Christus by Francis Pott.

After moving back to Westminster Abbey in 2004 he performed with the Abbey Choir on concert tours to the United States and Australia, and on a series of recordings for Hyperion. He was the principal organist for many special and daily services held at the Abbey. He won the Royal College of Organists Performer of the Year competition in 2002. His double disc The Organ of Westminster Cathedral has been widely acclaimed. Quinney is also active as a continuo player and writer on music. His Short Service for boys' voices was written for the choristers of Westminster Abbey and first performed in 2008. He played the organ for the wedding of Prince William, Duke of Cambridge, and Catherine Middleton in the Abbey on 29 April 2011, accompanying the choir and congregation.

== Career at Peterborough ==
He became the Director of Music at Peterborough Cathedral in April 2013, where he oversaw repitching of the cathedral's organ.

== New College, Oxford ==
In February 2014, Quinney was announced as Associate Professor in the Faculty of Music at the University of Oxford, and Organist and Tutorial Fellow in Music at New College, succeeding the retiring Edward Higginbottom, a post taking effect from July 2014.

== Discography ==
Partial discography:

- Parry: Songs of Farewell and other choral works (Novum, September 2018)
- The Gate of Heaven: Favourite Anthems from New College (Novum, 2017)
- Like as the Hart: Music for the Templar's Garden (Novum, 2017)
- Sing We! Advent and Christmas at New College (Novum, 2016)
- John Blow: Symphony Anthems (Novum, 2016)
- J S Bach: Trio Sonatas (Coro, 2011)
- The Organ of Westminster Abbey: music by Elgar (Signum, 2011)
- A New Heaven (Universal) – Organist for The Sixteen
- A Christmas Caroll from Westminster Abbey (Hyperion) – Organist for the Abbey Choir
- The Feast of the Ascension at Westminster Abbey (Hyperion) – Organist for the Abbey Choir
- The Organ of Westminster Cathedral – 2004 (Signum) (Gramophone Editor's Choice, BBC Music Magazine Instrumental Disc of the Month)
- O Sapientia: Advent from King's College London – 2003 (Herald) – Organist for the Choir of King's College London

Cultural offices
Preceded by Andrew Reid	Organist and Master of the Choristers of Peterborough Cathedral; 2013–2014	Succeeded by Steven Grahl
Preceded by Edward Higginbottom	Organist and Master of the Choristers of New College, Oxford; 2014–	Succeeded by
