= George Benjamin Arnold =

English organist and composer

George Benjamin Arnold (1832–1902) was an English organist and musical composer.

== Biography ==
Arnold was born on 22 December 1832 at Petworth, Sussex, the son of George Frederick Arnold, organist of the parish church there, and his wife Mary. He was articled to George William Chard, the organist of Winchester Cathedral, in 1849, and on Chard's death the articles were transferred to his successor, Samuel Sebastian Wesley. Arnold was organist successively at St. Columba's College, Rathfarnham, near Dublin (1852), St. Mary's Church, Torquay (1856), and New College, Oxford (1860–69).

Arnold graduated Mus. Bac. at Oxford in 1853 and Mus. Doc. in 1860. In 1865 he succeeded Wesley at Winchester Cathedral, retaining the post for the rest of his life. He was a fellow of the College of Organists, acting as an examiner for that body. He died at Winchester on 31 January 1902, and was buried there. He married on 6 June 1867 Mary Lucy Roberts, who survived him with three sons and a daughter. An alabaster tablet to his memory, with a quotation from one of his works, was placed in the north transept of the cathedral in 1904.

Arnold, whose sympathies were with Bach and his school, was a composer, chiefly of church music. His published compositions include a national song, Old England (1854); an oratorio, Ahab, produced by the National Choral Society at Exeter Hall (1864); Sennacherib, a sacred cantata, produced at the Gloucester Festival of 1883; The Song of the Redeemed, written for and produced at St. James's Church, New York (1891); An orchestral introduction and chorus in praise of King Alfred, performed at the inauguration of the Alfred Memorial at Winchester in 1901, besides two motets, two psalms, anthems, part songs, and two sonatas.

Cultural offices
Preceded by Stephen Elvey	Organist and Master of the Choristers of New College, Oxford; 1860–1869	Succeeded by James Taylor
