= Alexander's Feast (Handel) =

Musical ode by George Frideric Handel

George Frideric Handel

Alexander's Feast (HWV 75) is an ode with music by George Frideric Handel set to a libretto by Newburgh Hamilton. Hamilton adapted his libretto from John Dryden's ode Alexander's Feast, or the Power of Music (1697) which had been written to celebrate Saint Cecilia's Day. Jeremiah Clarke (whose score is now lost) set the original ode to music.

Handel composed the music in January 1736, and the work received its premiere at the Covent Garden Theatre, London, on 19 February 1736. In its original form it contained three concertos: a concerto in B flat major in 3 movements for "Harp, Lute, Lyrichord and other Instruments" HWV 294 for performance after the recitative Timotheus, plac'd on high in Part I; a concerto grosso in C major in 4 movements for oboes, bassoon and strings, now known as the "Concerto in Alexander's Feast" HWV 318, performed between Parts I and II; and an organ concerto HWV 289 in G minor and major in 4 movements for chamber organ, oboes, bassoon and strings performed after the chorus Let old Timotheus yield the prize in Part II. The organ concerto and harp concerto were published in 1738 by John Walsh as the first and last of the Handel organ concertos Op.4. Handel revised the music for performances in 1739, 1742 and 1751. The work was performed a total of 25 times during Handel's lifetime, making it one of the most frequently performed oratorios in his career. Donald Burrows has discussed Handel's revisions to the score.

The work describes a banquet held by Alexander the Great and his mistress Thaïs in the captured Persian city of Persepolis, during which the musician Timotheus sings and plays his lyre, arousing various moods in Alexander until he is finally incited to burn the city down in revenge for his dead Greek soldiers.

The piece was a great success and it encouraged Handel to make the transition from writing Italian operas to English choral works. The soloists at the premiere were the sopranos Anna Maria Strada and Cecilia Young, the tenor John Beard, and a bass called Erard (first name unknown).

== Structure of the work ==
- Part one:
1. Overture
2. Recitative (tenor): 'Twas at the royal feast
3. Aria and chorus (tenor): Happy, happy pair
4. Recitative: Timotheus plac'd on high
5. Recitative (Soprano): The song began from Jove
6. Recitative: The song began from Jove
7. Chorus: The list'ning crowd
8. Aria (soprano): With ravish'd ears
9. Recitative: The praise of Bacchus
10. Aria and chorus: Bacchus ever fair and young
11. Recitative: Sooth'd with the sound
12. Recitative: He chose a mournful muse
13. Aria (soprano): He sung Darius, great and good
14. Recitative: With downcast looks
15. Chorus: Behold Darius great and good
16. Recitative: The mighty master smil'd
17. Arioso (soprano): Softly sweet in Lydian measures
18. Aria (tenor): War, he sung, is toil and trouble
19. Chorus: The many rend the skies with loud applause
20. Aria (soprano): The prince, unable to conceal his pain
21. Chorus: The many rend the skies with loud applause
- Part two:
1. Recitative and chorus: Now strike the golden lyre again
2. Aria (bass): Revenge, Timotheus cries
3. Recitative: Give vengeance the due
4. Aria (tenor): The princes applaud with a furious joy
5. Aria and chorus (soprano): Thais led the way
6. Recitative (tenor): Thus long ago
7. Chorus: At last divine Cecilia came
8. Recitative (soloists + chorus): Let old Timotheus yield the prize
9. Chorus: Let old Timotheus yield the prize
10. Organ concerto, Opus 4 Number 1
11. Chorus: Your voices tune

== Recordings ==
- 1968 – Honor Sheppard (soprano), Max Worthley (tenor), Maurice Bevan (bass) – Oriana Concert Choir & Orchestra, conducted by Alfred Deller – originally issued on The Bach Guild label in 1964, later transitioned to Vanguard in 1968 (2 LP SRV-282/3 SD) and reissued in 1993 on CD (2 CD 08 9057 72)
- 1978 – Felicity Palmer (soprano), Anthony Rolfe Johnson (tenor), Stephen Roberts (bass) – Bachchor Stockholm, Concentus Musicus Wien, conducted by Nikolaus Harnoncourt – originally issued on Telefunken (2 LP 6.35440 EK), and reissued in 1984, 2000 and 2009 on CD (242 641-2, 3984-26796-2, 2564 59056-2) on Teldec
- 1979 – Helen Donath (soprano I), Sally Burgess (soprano II), Robert Tear (tenor), Thomas Allen (bass) – Choir of King's College, Cambridge, English Chamber Orchestra, conducted by Philip Ledger – originally issued on EMI (2 LP SLS 5168), and reissued in 2010 on CD (2 CD 50999 6 28520 2 9) on Virgin Classics, paired with Ledger's 1974 recording of The Choice of Hercules
- 1988 – Donna Brown (soprano I), Carolyn Watkinson (soprano II), Ashley Stafford (countertenor), Nigel Robson (tenor), Stephen Varcoe (bass) – Monteverdi Choir, English Baroque Soloists, conducted by Sir John Eliot Gardiner – recorded live on June 13 & 14, 1987 at the Stadthalle Göttingen; originally issued on Philips Classics (2 LP 422 053-1), and reissued in 1988 and 2006 on CD (422 053-2, 475 7774) on Philips Classics and Decca Records, for the latter's The Originals series of reissued material
- 1991 – Nancy Argenta (soprano), Ian Partridge (tenor), Michael George (bass) – The Sixteen, conducted by Harry Christophers – includes the insertion concertos (HWV 294 & 289), but lacks the concerto grosso; originally issued on Collins Classics (2 CD 70162), and reissued in 2006 (2 CD COR16028) on CORO, The Sixteen's own independent record label

== Alexander's Feast today: performances and recordings ==
The soprano aria War, he sung, is toil and trouble was featured in Alfonso Cuaron's film Children of Men.
