= Alexander's Feast (Dryden poem) =

1697 poem by John Dryden

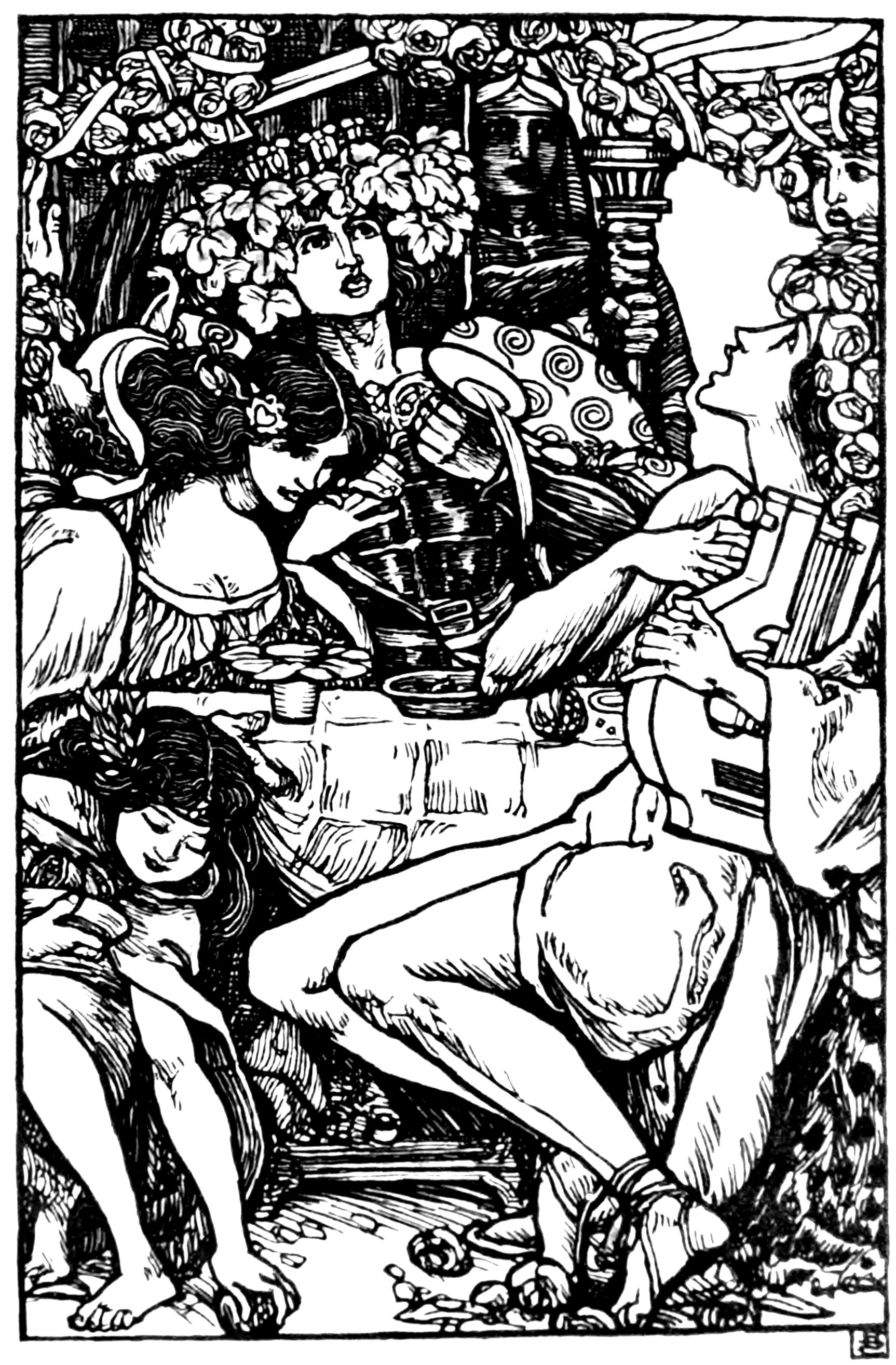
Art Nouveau illustration from a 1904 edition of "Alexander's Feast"

"Alexander's Feast, or the Power of Music" (1697) is an ode by John Dryden. It was written to celebrate Saint Cecilia's Day. Jeremiah Clarke set the original ode to music, but the score is now lost.

== Background ==
In 1683 the Musical Society of London was formed for the purpose of commissioning and performing annually an ode in honour of Saint Cecilia, the patron saint of music. Dryden had previously written another ode, "A Song for St. Cecilia's Day", for the 1687 festival. "Alexander's Feast" was written for the 1697 festival.

== Analysis ==
The main body of the poem describes the feast given by Alexander the Great at the Persian capital Persepolis, after his defeat of Darius in 331 BC. Alexander's bard Timotheus sings praises of him. Alexander's emotions are manipulated by the singer's poetry and music. Timotheus glorifies him as a god, puffing up Alexander's pride. He then sings of the pleasures of wine, encouraging Alexander to drink. Seeing Alexander becoming too boisterous, he sings of the sad death of Darius; the king becomes quiet. He then lauds the beauty of Thaïs, Alexander's lover, making the king's heart melt. Finally, he encourages feelings of anger and vengeance, causing Thaïs and Alexander to burn down the Persian palace in revenge for Persia's previous outrages against Greece.

The poem then moves ahead in time to describe Saint Cecilia, "inventress of the vocal frame", who is traditionally supposed to have created the first organ and to have instituted Christian sacred music. The poem concludes that while Timotheus "Raised a mortal to the skies, / She drew an angel down".

== Music ==
George Frideric Handel composed a choral work, also called Alexander's Feast, set to a libretto by Newburgh Hamilton, which was closely based on Dryden's ode.

Sir James MacMillan was commissioned to create a new choral work jointly by the Hallé and Cincinnati Symphony orchestras. The work, completed in 2022 and titled "Timotheus, Bacchus and Cecilia" sets the second, third, and final verses of Dryden's ode.

== Bibliography ==
- Endicott, N. J. (2022). "Alexander's Feast". RPO: Representative Poetry Online. University of Toronto Libraries. Accessed 10 March 2022.
- Mambrol, Nasrullah (6 July 2020). "Analysis of John Dryden’s Alexander’s Feast". Literariness: Literary Theory and Criticism. Accessed 10 March 2022.
