= Musical Society of London =

A Musical Society of London was formed in 1683, and commissioned works from Henry Purcell. However, the term usually refers to an organisation which existed in the middle of the 19th century. It was founded in April 1858 by Charles Kensington Salaman (Honorary Secretary until 1865).

== Founders ==
The members had originally been part of the New Philharmonic Society. The founders included Augustine Sargood, Esq. (Treasurer); C. E. Horsley, Esq. (Honorary Librarian); W. V. Wallace; George Alexander Macfarren; Henry Smart; Julius Benedict; Stephen Elvey; John Goss (composer); E. J. Hopkins; Bernhard Molique; Sir F. A. Gore-Ouseley; and Dr. S. S. Wesley.

== First Council ==
In 1859 the council included Julius Benedict, Charles Edward Horsley, George Alexander Macfarren, Bernhard Molique, Mori, Osborne, Smart, W.V.Wallace, and William Chappell (writer), together with the Reverend Sir W. H. Cope, Bart., Sir J. E. Harington, Bart., Dr. Rimbault, and Mr. Augustine Sargood the barrister.

The Society performed works by Alice Mary Smith in 1863 and John Francis Barnett in 1864.
