= David Lumsden (musician) =

Sir David Lumsden

Background information
- Born: David James Lumsden; 19 March 1928; Newcastle upon Tyne, England
- Died: 25 February 2023 (aged 94) Winchester, England
- Genres: Choral music, classical music, liturgical music
- Occupations: Academic, conductor, choirmaster, organist, harpsichordist, conservatoire chief
- Instruments: Organ, Harpsichord, Piano
- Spouse: Sheila Daniels

Sir David James Lumsden (19 March 1928 – 25 February 2023) was a British musical educator, conservatoire-chief, conductor, choirmaster, organist and harpsichordist. After studying music at Cambridge he was a church organist, and later an academic. He was principal of the Royal Scottish Academy of Music and Drama in Glasgow from 1976 to 1982 and of the Royal Academy of Music in London from 1982 to 1993.

== Life and career ==
Lumsden was born in Newcastle upon Tyne on 19 March 1928. He was educated at Dame Allan's School in Newcastle, and Selwyn College, Cambridge, where he was organ scholar from 1948 to 1951. He studied with Boris Ord and Thurston Dart, graduating Bachelor of Arts in 1950 and Bachelor of Music in 1951. That year he married Sheila Daniels.

After leaving Cambridge, Lumsden held a succession of church appointments. He was assistant organist of St John's College, Cambridge, 1951–53; organist and choirmaster, St Mary's Church, Nottingham, and, piano teacher in Nottingham, 1954–56; and director of music and rector chori, Southwell Minster, 1956–59. In 1956 he took his PhD, with a dissertation on Elizabethan lute music, a subject on which the Oxford Dictionary of Music ranks him as an authority.

Following his church career, Lumsden became fellow, organist and choirmaster of New College, Oxford and a lecturer in the faculty of music, University of Oxford 1959–76; Grove's Dictionary of Music and Musicians says of his time there, "He inherited … a choir of high reputation and added to its lustre, as was evidenced by the choir's unusually diverse repertory, its recordings and its impact on audiences during two tours of the USA (1973 and 1975)". He was director of music at Keele University, 1958–59, and professor of harmony at the Royal Academy of Music (RAM), London, 1959–61.

As a conductor, Lumsden was founder and conductor of the Nottingham Bach Society, 1954–59, and conducted the Oxford Harmonic Society, 1961–63, the Oxford Sinfonia, 1967–70, and the BBC Scottish Singers, 1977–80. As an organist and harpsichordist he was organist of the Sheldonian Theatre, 1964–76, choragus of Oxford University, 1968–72 and harpsichordist to the London Virtuosi, 1972–75, whose other players were flautist James Galway alongside principals of the London Symphony Orchestra. Much in-demand as an organ soloist, Lumsden appeared at the 1966 BBC Proms, frequently at London's Royal Festival Hall, and toured the United States on a number of occasions. His discography includes over 40 recordings of repertoire for solo organ, choir and chamber ensemble.

From 1976 to 1982, Lumsden was principal of the Royal Scottish Academy of Music and Drama (RSAMD) in Glasgow. He headed the "Save the BBC Scottish Orchestra" action committee in 1980; the BBC abandoned its plan to disband the orchestra.

Lumsden was appointed to succeed Sir Anthony Lewis as principal of the RAM from August 1982. He caused controversy in 1988 by what Nicholas Kenyon called "plans to create a high level conservatory … for soloists on the model of the Curtis Institute in Philadelphia", cutting the academy's total number of students. Kenyon added that "the plan caused a huge row with the other music colleges", which felt that this was an attempt to benefit the Academy at their expense. Lumsden caused further controversy by bringing in world-famous musicians to "International Chairs" to pass on their knowledge. They included Sir Colin Davis, Lynn Harrell, Hans Werner Henze, Stephen Kovacevich, Anne-Sophie Mutter and Robert Tear. Some members of the RAM faculty felt that occasional visits from star performers added little and even detracted from the day-to-day work of the resident teaching staff. His work at the RAM, despite some people viewing it as controversial, made the RAM the global musical influence that it is today.

During his time at the RAM, Lumsden served as chairman of the National Youth Orchestra and the Early Music Society. He retired from the RAM in 1993.

== Family ==
Lumsden and his wife Sheila had four children, two sons, Andrew Lumsden (director of music at Winchester Cathedral) and Stephen Lumsden (founder and chief executive of the international classical music agency Intermusica), and two daughters; Jane, an academic (who married the organist John Scott), and their eldest child Jennifer, a medic.

Sheila Lumsden died on 8 August 2022. Lumsden died on 25 February 2023 at the age of 94. His four children survive him.

== Honours and awards ==
Lumsden was knighted in 1985 and received honorary fellowships, memberships or degrees from Selwyn College, Cambridge, the Royal College of Organists (1976); the RAM (1978); the Royal College of Music (1980); the Royal Northern College of Music (1981); the RSAMD (1982); the Guildhall School of Music and Drama (1984); the Royal Society of Musicians (1984); the London College of Music (1985); the Royal Society of Arts (1985); the Royal School of Church Music (1987); Trinity College, London (1988); the University of Reading (1990); and King's College, London (1991). The Music Centre of his old school, Dame Allan's School, Newcastle upon Tyne is called the Lumsden Centre in his honour.

== Publications ==
Lumsden published two books: An Anthology of English Lute Music, 1954; and Thomas Robinson’s Schoole of Musicke, 1603, 1971. He contributed articles to publications including The Listener; The Score; Music & Letters; the Galpin Society Journal; La Luth et sa Musique; and La Musique de la Renaissance. He provided the introduction to The Treasury of English Church Music, Volume 5, in 1965.

Cultural offices
Preceded by Henry Oswald Hodgson	Director of Music of St Mary's Church, Nottingham; 1954–1956	Succeeded by Russell Arthur Missin
Preceded by Robert Ashfield	Rector Chori of Southwell Minster; 1956–1959	Succeeded by Kenneth Beard
Preceded by Meredith Davies	Organist and Master of the Choristers of New College, Oxford; 1959–1976	Succeeded by Edward Higginbottom
Preceded by Anthony Lewis	Principal of the Royal Academy of Music; 1982–1993	Succeeded by Lynn Harrell
