= Edward Higginbottom =

English choirmaster (born 1946)

Edward Higginbottom FRCO
- Born: 16 November 1946 (age 79); Kendal
- Genres: Choral music
- Occupations: Musicologists, Organist, Choirmaster
- Instrument: Pipe Organ
- Years active: 1970-
- Label: Novum

Edward Higginbottom (born 16 November 1946, Kendal) is a music scholar, organist, choirmaster and conductor. Most of his career has been as organist at New College, Oxford, where he led their choir for 38 years and produced a large number of choral recordings.

== Musical biography ==
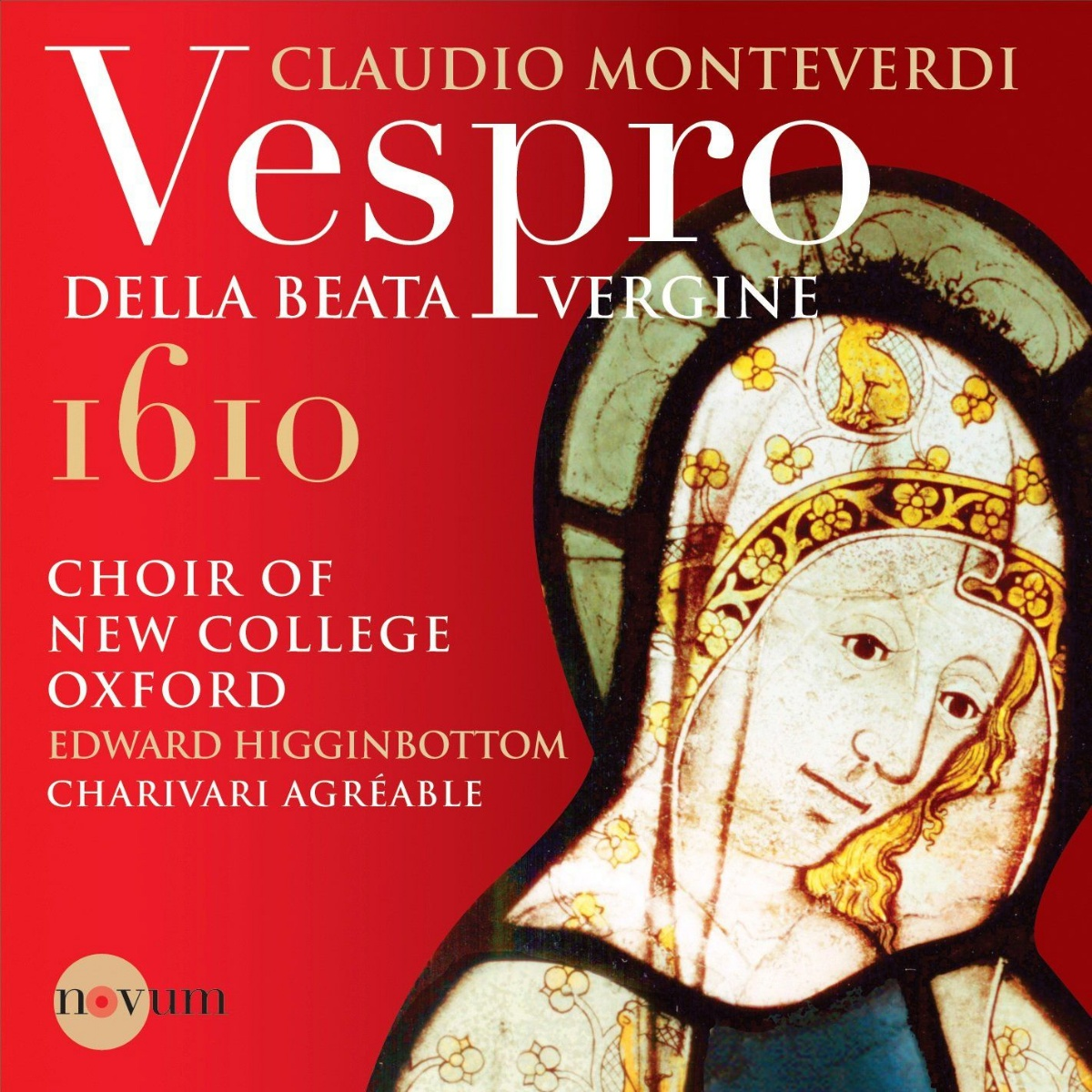
Montiverdi Vespers New College

Before moving on to St Mary's Church in Warwick, Edward was a chorister at his local parish church where he started playing the organ. Edward completed his undergraduate and graduate training as organ scholar of Corpus Christi College, Cambridge, where he developed a particular interest in French baroque music and became a Fellow of the Royal College of Organists. He toured regularly in France at that time as director of the Cambridge University Purcell Society. As a graduate student, he spent time in France (1970–1972), studying the organ with Marie-Claire Alain while working on his doctoral thesis.

He was appointed as the Organist and Director of Music at New College, Oxford in 1976. While the main role of the choir is to provide liturgical music for worship, Edward went further, organizing economically viable choir tours and a broad set of musical recordings. By doing so, he "has helped the cause of such institutions through a period when financial constraints and changes in social attitudes have threatened choral foundations".

In 1990 he was made an officer, and subsequently a Commandeur of the Ordre des Arts et des Lettres by the French Ministry of Culture for "his role in the revival of choir schools in France and support of French cultural activities".

In 2010 he formed a new recording label for the Choir, novum, and the choir began experimenting with weekly webcasting of their Evensong services.

Retiring from New College in 2014, he continues his musical career as a freelancer. He is the principal conductor of an Oxford ensemble called Instruments of Time and Truth. In spite of his retirement, however, he was named in March 2019 as the Director of Chapel Music at St Peter's College, Oxford for the 2019/20 academic year, pending the appointment of a successor to Jeremy Summerly in 2020.

== Personal life ==
Edward and his wife Caroline have 7 adult children, including his son (who was also a chorister) Orlando, better known professionally as Totally Enormous Extinct Dinosaurs, an animal chiropractor, a jeweller, a doctor, a teacher, a timpanist, and a writer.

An early episode of ITV's Inspector Morse featured a character based on Edward Higginbottom (although the suspect, and his obsession with Spangles and Trebor Mints, bears no similarity to the real Edward Higginbottom).

== Recordings ==
Recent recordings include:

Title	Composer	Performers	Year
Music for Salzburg Cathedral	Mozart	Choir of New College Oxford, Collegium Novum	2013
Musique sacrée	Charpentier	Choir of New College Oxford, Oxford Baroque	2013
Britten, The Sacred Choral Music	Benjamin Britten	Choir of New College Oxford	2013
Haydn, Nelson Mass	Joseph Haydn	Choir of New College Oxford, New Century Baroque, Jonty Ward, Hugh Cutting, Nick Pritchard, Tom Edwards	2012
Illumina: Music of Light	Mahler, Rutter, Bach and others	Choir of New College Oxford	2012
Francois Couperin, Exultent superi	Francois Couperin	Soloists of the Choir of New College Oxford, Collegium Novum	2011
W. A. Mozart, Requiem	Mozart	Choir of New College Oxford, Orchestra of the Age of Enlightenment	2011
Claudio Monteverdi, Vespro della Beata Vergine 1610	Claudio Monteverdi	Nicholas Mulroy, Thomas Hobbs, Thomas Raskin, Choir of New College Oxford, Charivari Agreable	2010
J S Bach, Motets	Bach	Choir of New College Oxford	2009
The Victorian and Edwardian Anthem	Elgar, Parry, Stainer and others	Choir of New College Oxford, Nicholas Wearne, David Newsholme	2008
Nicholas Ludford, Missa Benedicta & antiennes votives	Nicholas Ludford	Choir of New College Oxford	2008
Haydn, The Creation	Joseph Haydn	Lawson, Muller, Stout, Choir of New College Oxford, Oxford Philomusica	2008
Evensong at New College Oxford	Harris, Coward, Stanford and others	Choir of New College Oxford, Nicholas Wearne, Robert Patterson, Jane Shaw	2008
The Art of the Chorister	Mendelssohn, Couperin, Mozart and others	The Choristers of New College Oxford, Collegium Novum String Ensemble, Collegium Novum Baroque Strings	2008
Poulenc and his French Contemporaries	Poulenc, Francis/Messiaen, Olivier/Villiette, Pierre	Choir of New College Oxford, David Newsholme, Nicholas Wearne	2006
Macmillan and his British Contemporaries	Macmillan, Anderson, Dove and others	Choir of New College Oxford, Robert Patterson, Nicholas Wearne	2006
Handel, Messiah (1751 Version)	Handel	Jenkinson, Jones, Brookes, Davies, Spence, Dougan, Choir of New College Oxford, The Academy of Ancient Music	2006
Copland and his American Contemporaries	Copland, Hailstork, Stravinsky and others	Choir of New College Oxford	2006
The Georgian Anthem	Wesley, Crotch, Battishill and others	Choir of New College Oxford	2004
J S Bach, St John Passion	Bach	Gilchrist, Bernays, Dougan, Bowman, Beale, Baldy, Littlewood, Choir of New College Oxford, Collegium Novum	2003

== Publications related to music ==
Edward Higginbottom has edited music by François Couperin and Michel Corrette, and written articles on French Baroque music.

- "Organ Music and the liturgy", Cambridge Companion to the Organ
- "The French classical organ school", Cambridge Companion to the Organ

Cultural offices
Preceded by David Lumsden	Organist and Master of the Choristers of New College, Oxford; 1976–2014	Succeeded by Robert Quinney
