= Stephen Elvey =

British organist and composer

Stephen Elvey (1805–1860) was an organist and composer.

== Life ==
Stephen Elvey was the elder brother, and for some time the teacher, of Sir George Elvey. He was born in Canterbury in June 1805, and received his training as a chorister of the Canterbury Cathedral under Highmore Skeats. In 1830 he succeeded Bennett as organist of New College, Oxford, and won a reputation for his playing. He became Mus. Bac. Oxon. 1831, and Mus. Doc. 1838. He was organist of the University Church of St Mary the Virgin, and from 1846 organist of St. John's College.

While William Crotch simultaneously held the offices of professor of music and choragus at Oxford, Elvey acted as his deputy in all professorial matters for some years until Crotch died at the end of 1847. During his time at Oxford, Elvey taught composition and music theory to Frederick Ouseley. In 1848 the offices were divided, Sir Henry Bishop becoming professor, and Dr. Elvey choragus. He retained his appointments until his death in October 1860, at the age of fifty-five.

== Works ==
His Evening Service in continuation of Croft's Morning Service in A dates from about 1825, when Elvey was a lay-clerk at Canterbury Cathedral. The Oxford Psalm Book (1852), containing six original tunes, was inspired by the 'increasing attention to music shown by the congregational character of the singing before university sermons;' The Psalter, or Canticles and Psalms of David, Pointed for Chanting upon a New Principle (1856) and the Canticles (1858) went through many editions.

Cultural offices
Preceded by Alfred Bennett	Organist and Master of the Choristers of New College, Oxford; 1830–1860	Succeeded by George Benjamin Arnold
