= Benjamin Barron Wiffen =

English businessman and bibliophile

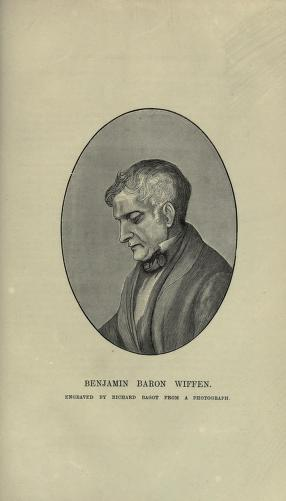
- Born: 28 October 1794; Woburn, Bedfordshire
- Died: 18 March 1867 (aged 72)
- Occupations: English Quaker businessman and bibliophile

Benjamin Barron Wiffen (1794–1867) was an English Quaker businessman, bibliophile and biographer of early Spanish Protestant reformers.

== Early life ==
The second son of John Wiffen, ironmonger, and his wife Elizabeth (née Pattison), he was born at Woburn, Bedfordshire; his elder brother was Jeremiah Holmes Wiffen. He followed his brother to Ackworth school in 1803; on leaving in 1808 he went into his father's business. His mother Elizabeth was left widowed with a young family. Wiffen remained in business at Woburn till 1838, when his health failed, and he retired to Mount Pleasant, Aspley Guise, near Woburn, with his mother and two unmarried sisters.

== Anti-slavery and Spain ==
Early in 1840 Luis de Usoz came to London from Madrid, and was introduced by George Borrow to Josiah Forster. When Wiffen came to the Friends' meeting in Whitweek, Forster told him that Usoz had inquired after his late brother as a translator of Spanish poetry. At Forster's request he called on Usoz in Jermyn Street, beginning a lifelong friendship. Wiffen attended the World Anti-Slavery Convention in June as a delegate. In late 1840 or early 1841 Wiffen made his first visit to Spain with George William Alexander, as a deputation to forward the abolitionist cause there.

In 1842 Wiffen accompanied Alexander a second time to Spain and Portugal. Correspondence between John Scoble and François-André Isambert led Wiffen to seek out the Barcelona publisher Antonio Bergnes de las Casas (1801–1879). Bergnes had first been visited in 1833 by William Allen and Stephen Grellet. Contact was renewed through Santiago Usoz, brother to Luis. Bergnes became a publisher for British abolitionist material in Spain. Wiffen also passed material relating to Juan Francisco Manzano and his poetic slave narrative to Usoz, with the co-operation of Richard Robert Madden. In 1843 Wiffen made another research trip with Alexander, to the Netherlands and Denmark in particular.

== The Reformistas antiguos españoles series ==
Wiffen knew Richard Thomas How of Aspley Guise, owner of a library collected by his father Richard How (1727–1801) who had edited Rachel Russell, Lady Russell's Letters. How hinted at an old work, by Juan de Valdés, which represented essentially the Quaker principles of George Fox. It was in the summer of 1841, during a visit of Usoz to Mount Pleasant, that they decided to publish works of the early Spanish reformers. An attraction of the project was the validation these writings gave to the inner light doctrine.

As his travels allowed, Wiffen began book-hunting. John Martin the bibliographer, who settled at Froxfield, Bedfordshire, described Wiffen as a friend and neighbour as well as a specialist collector of books. Besides buying rare works he copied others, or obtained transcripts.

The collection Obras Antiguas de los Españoles Reformados appeared 1847–65 (20 vols.), privately printed under his supervision. He himself edited vol. ii., the Epistola Consolatoria (1848) by Juan Pérez de Pineda, with a notice of the author in English (reprinted with the English translation, 1871 by John T. Betts) and Spanish; and vol. xv., the Alfabeto Cristiano (1861) by Juan de Valdés, in Italian, with modern versions in Spanish and English. The remaining volumes were edited by Usoz. A reprinted edition was produced in Barcelona in 1981. Betts was a friend of Wiffen and Usoz.

== Death ==
Wiffen died, unmarried, at Mount Pleasant on 18 March 1867, and was buried in the Friends' graveyard at Woburn Sands on 24 March. He always wore Quaker garb, and was strict in observances.

== Other works ==
Wiffen wrote also the Life and Writings of Juan de Valdés (1865) which accompanies the English translations of works of Valdés by John T. Betts; and a Biographical Sketch (1869) of Constantino Ponce de la Fuente, to accompany the English version of his Confession of a Sinner, also by Betts. Eduard Böhmer printed two volumes (1874 and 1883) called Bibliotheca Wiffeniana, containing lives and writings of Spanish reformers from 1520, based on Wiffen's work. He further published a number of Spanish tracts. His interest in Francisco de Enzinas led to contact with Abraham Kuyper who was studying John a Lasco; it is presumed to have happened through Frederik Muller.

In early life, and again later, Wiffen wrote verse. His Warder of the Pyrenees appeared in William Finden's Tableaux of National Character (1845), edited by his sister, Priscilla Maden Wiffen (Zillah), who had married Alaric Alexander Watts. In The Liberty Bell for 1848, he published Placido, the Cuban Poet, on Gabriel de la Concepción Valdés, known as Plácido, who was executed in 1844.

Warder of the Pyrenees was reprinted in the selection of his poems, mostly then unpublished, in The Brothers Wiffen (1880), edited by Samuel Rowles Pattison. Richard Thomas How is portrayed in Wiffen's poem The Quaker Squire. It formed part of an unpublished manuscript memorial, from 1840.

Wiffen's papers went to Wadham College, Oxford.
