= Samuel Williams (engraver) =

English engraver (1788-1853)

Samuel Williams (23 February 1788 – 19 September 1853) was a British draughtsman and wood-engraver.

== Life ==
Williams was born at Colchester, on 23 February 1788. He was apprenticed to the Colchester printer J. Marsden, but taught himself to draw and engrave on wood. Headopted printmaking as his profession, and became known as a specialist in landscapes. He established himself first in Colchester, and then settled in London in 1819.

In the early part of his life, Williams also painted miniatures, and a few oil pictures. Having a facility in design, he used his own drawings for a high proportion of his prints. His first patron was Benjamin Crosby the publisher, for whom he illustrated a work on natural history in 1810.

He was elected a member of the American Antiquarian Society in 1819. John Orrin Smith and George Baxter were his pupils.

Williams died on 19 September 1853.

== Works ==
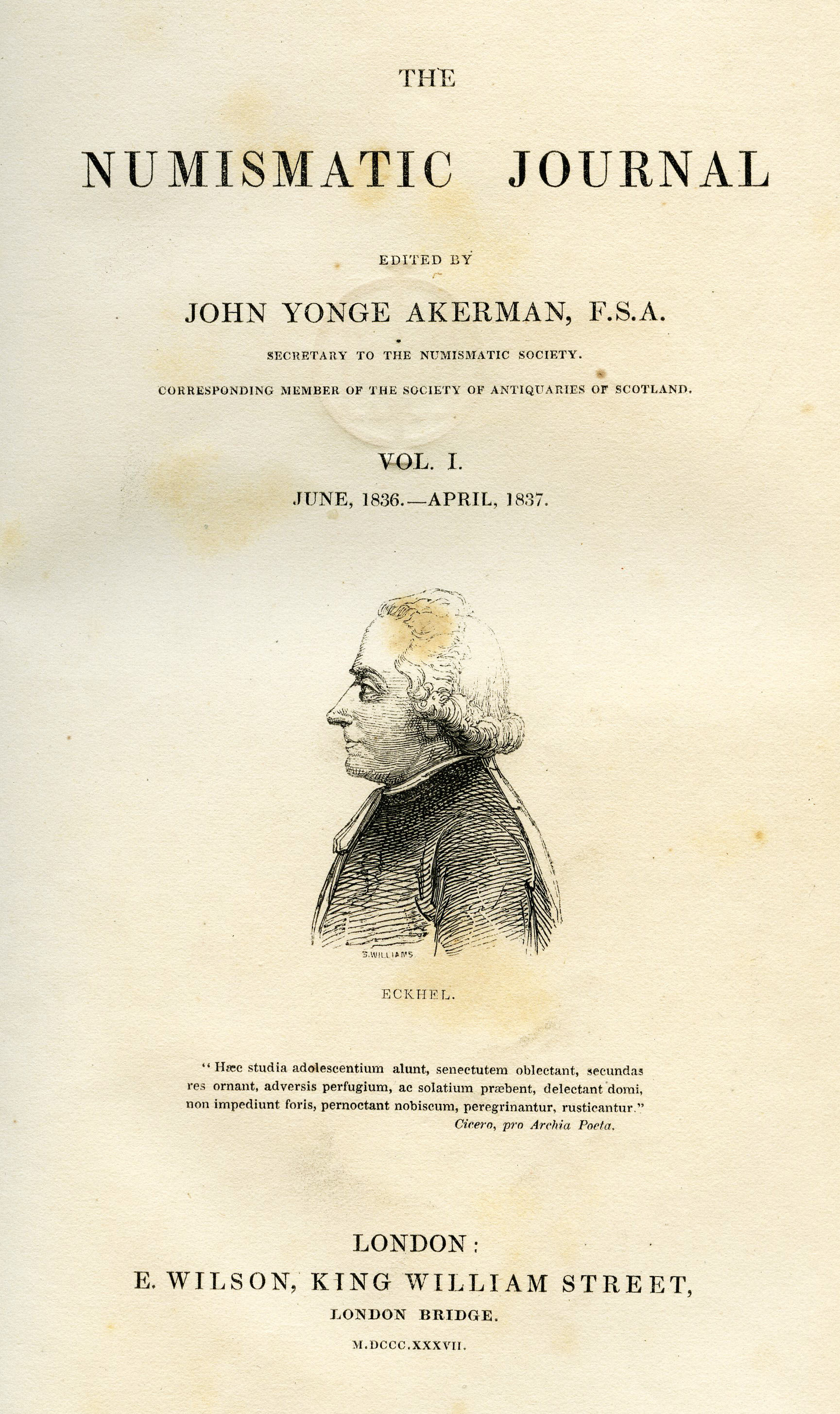
Wood-engraving of the numiscatist Joseph Hilarius Eckhel by Williams on the first front-page of The Numismatic Journal, about 1837

From his own designs, Williams produced the illustrations to:

- Charles Whittingham's edition of Robinson Crusoe, 1822;
- Mary Trimmer, Natural History, 1823–4;
- The British Stage, 1826 and following years;
- Scott's Bible, 1833–4;
- The Olio, a weekly magazine, 1828–33;
- William Hone, Every-Day Book, 1825–7;
- Charlotte Guest, Mabinogion, 1838;
- James Thomson, The Seasons, 1841;
- Prideaux John Selby, A History of British Forest Trees Indigenous and Introduced, 1842; and
- Thomas Miller, Pictures of Country Life, 1847.

Cuts from the designs of others are in:

- Jeremiah Holmes Wiffen's edition of Tasso's Jerusalem Delivered, 1823;
- John Gibson Lockhart, Spanish Ballads, 1840;
- the Abbotsford edition of the Waverley Novels, 1842;
- William Scrope, Deer-stalking, 1846;
- Franz Theodor Kugler, Handbook of Painting; and
- Henry Hart Milman, Horace, 1849.

== Family ==
Williams left four sons and a daughter, all of whom successfully practised wood-engraving. Thomas Williams (fl. 1830), his younger brother, was his pupil, and a wood-engraver who worked only after others. His prints can be found in James Northcote's Artist's Book of Fables 1828; and John Martin and Richard Westall's Bible Illustrations, 1833.

== Notes ==
Attribution

- This article incorporates text from a publication now in the public domain: Lee, Sidney, ed. (1900). "Williams, Samuel". Dictionary of National Biography. Vol. 61. London: Smith, Elder & Co.
