= Hanson Cement =

British cement production company

Hanson quarry products Europe ltd
- Type: Subsidiary
- Industry: Building materials
- Founded: 1929; 97 years ago
- Headquarters: Birmingham, England, United Kingdom
- Products: Cement
- Number of employees: 1,200
- Parent: Heidelberg Cement
- Website: www.hanson.co.uk

Hanson Cement was a cement production company located in the United Kingdom. It was called Castle Cement until it was rebranded in 2009. The company is now owned by HeidelbergCement, with the UK business managed by Heidelberg Materials UK. Hanson Cement has a long history dating back to the early 19th century, when it was founded as the Portland Cement Company.

== History ==
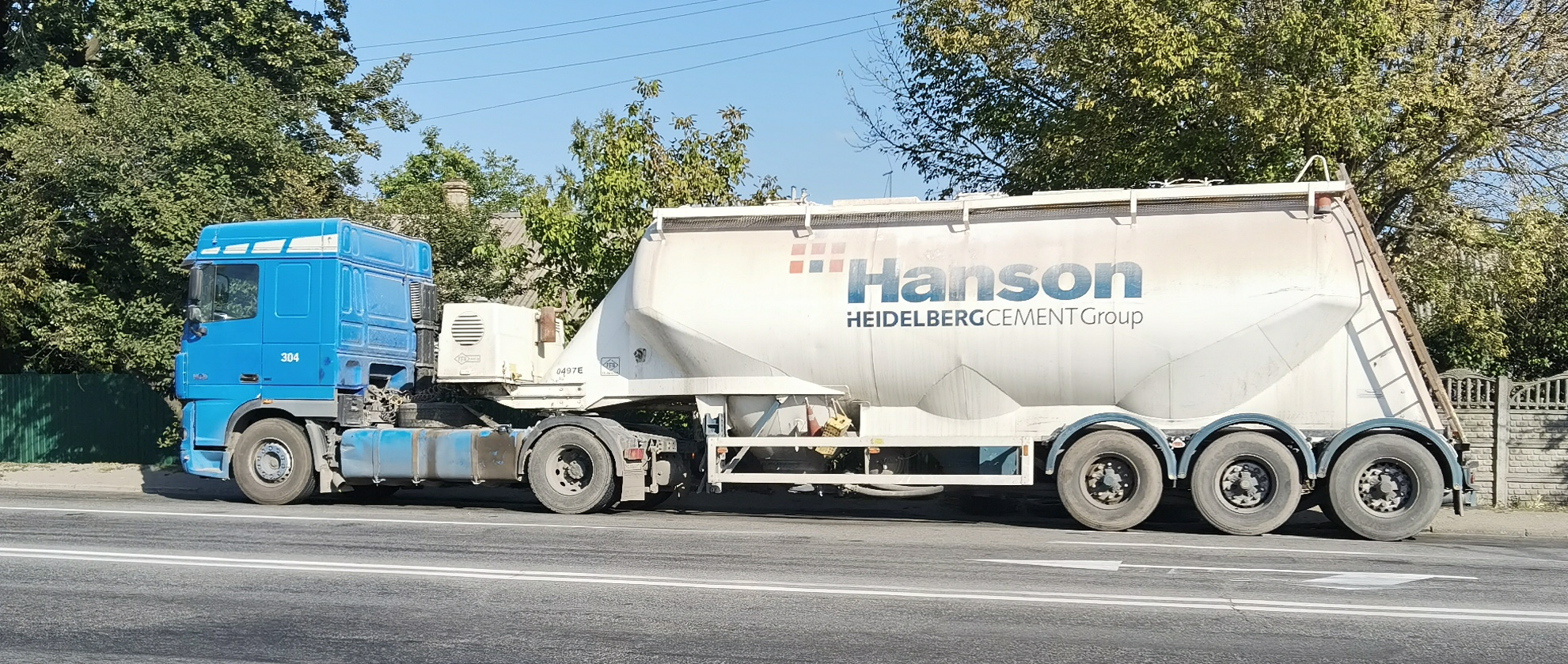
Hanson Heidelberg cement truck in Ukraine

The company was formed in 1981 through an amalgamation of three firms: Tunnel Portland Cement Company Ltd (founded 1874) with plants at West Thurrock, Essex (1874), Pitstone, Buckinghamshire (1937) and Padeswood, Flintshire (1949); Ketton Portland Cement Company Ltd (founded 1929) with a plant at Ketton, Rutland; and Ribblesdale Cement Ltd (founded 1937) with a plant at Clitheroe, Lancashire.

In 1999, the German company HeidelbergCement acquired Scancem International, the parent company of Castle Cement, for roughly €2.4 billion. By 2000, as a result of consolidation in the British construction sector, Castle Cement had emerged as one of the 'big three' cement manufacturers based in the UK.

In June 2002, Castle Cement was awarded a contract to supply 58,000 tonnes of Portland Cement for the construction of the High Speed 1 rail link between London and the Channel Tunnel. That same year, it launched a two-year programme to build a new kiln at its Padeswood site at an estimated cost of £48 million.

In 2005, the company's depot in Birmingham was sold and subsequently redeveloped as Curzon Gate.

During the mid 2000s, Castle Cement, alongside cement producers across Europe, undertook investments to comply with new regulations as well as to reduce carbon emissions.

In October 2006, Castle Cement commenced operations of its new kiln at Padeswood; built at a final cost of £64 million and designed to run on alternative fuels to reduce its emissions, the kiln's opening ceremony was officiated by the Welsh First Minister Rhodri Morgan. Two months later, the company emerged victorious in legal action that was taken over the company's right to dispose of kiln waste at Padeswood; it also announced plans to build a new cement mill alongside the recently completed kiln at Padeswood. Furthermore, that same year, the firm enacted 10 percent price rises due to increased energy costs.

In May 2007, the British company Hanson Plc was acquired by HeidelbergCement in exchange for £8 billion. This transaction made the combined company the second largest cement and building materials company in the world, and was completed through Heidelberg subsidiary Lehigh UK on 22 August 2007.

In 2008, as a consequence of the wider economic slowdown of the Great Recession, Castle Cement's fiscal performance was negatively impacted. That same year, it was amongst the various cement firms to raise concerns over proposed EU rules that would see charges imposed for their outputs of carbon dioxide, claiming that the economic impact could greatly diminish the whole field.

During February 2010, Castle Cement admitted to numerous environmental offences (which were related to instances of fire, dust, and noise) that were committed over the years leading up to 2009, which led to the company being fined £250,000 by the Environment Agency Wales (EAW).

During 2023, the company was reportedly planning the construction of a new carbon capture facility that was aimed at reducing the emissions from their Padeswood cement works. The British government chose the firm, along with other companies, to present progress plans for carbon reduction solutions.

During late 2021, company employees threatened industrial action on account of a 2.5 per cent pay offer, which was below the rate of inflation.

== Operations ==
The head office was in Castle Hill at Maidenhead in Berkshire, and the works are located in Ketton in Rutland, Buckley in Flintshire, Clitheroe and Avonmouth near Bristol. The company had a marine terminal at Avonmouth that is used for the importation of cement in bulk, with samples from there tested at the Ketton site's laboratory each week to ensure they meet British Standards. Cement was also imported through the Humber ports.
