= Ketton Quarries =

Protected area in Rutland, England

Coordinates: 52.639°N 0.568°W

- Site of Special Scientific Interest
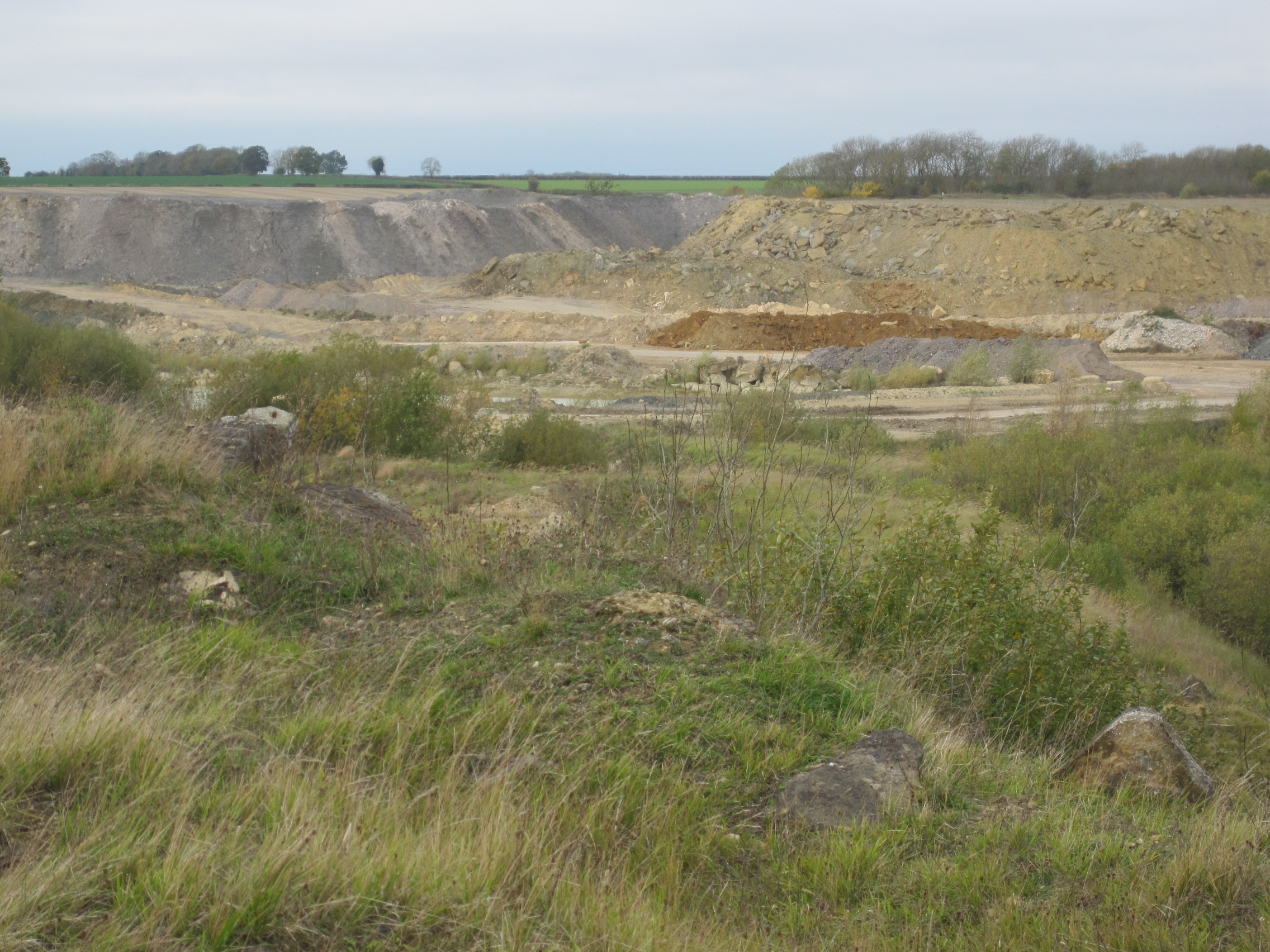
- Location of Ketton Quarries.
- Area of search: Rutland
- Grid reference: SK 970 055
- Interest: Biological; Geological
- Area: 115.6 hectares
- Notification date: 1986
- Location map: Magic Map

Ketton Quarries is a 115.6-hectare (286-acre) biological and geological Site of Special Scientific Interest east of Ketton in Rutland. It is a Geological Conservation Review site, and an area of 27.5 hectares is managed by the Leicestershire and Rutland Wildlife Trust.

The site provides an extensive exposure of the middle Jurassic Bathonian age, dating to around 167 million years ago. It is described by Natural England as "a critical site of considerable importance for lithostratigraphic and facies analysis in the Bathonian rocks of southern Britain". The older workings and spoil heaps are one of the largest areas of semi-natural limestone grassland and scrub in the county.

There is access to Ketton Quarry nature reserve from Pit Lane. Some areas are working quarries with no public access.

== See also ==
- Ketton Cement Works
- Ketton stone
