= Henry Bonney =

Henry Kaye Bonney D.D. (22 May 1780 – 24 December 1862) was an English churchman, photographer and author.

== Life ==
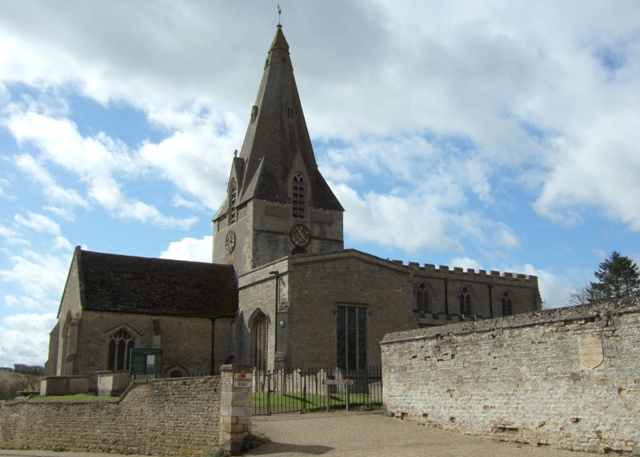
King's Cliffe church

Bonney was born on 22 May 1780, the son of Henry Kaye Bonney, rector of Kings Cliffe, Northamptonshire, and prebendary of Lincoln, at Tansor, Northamptonshire, the parish of which his father was then rector. His brother Thomas was also a priest, who later became Archdeacon of Leicester. His father's family friend, John Fane, 10th Earl of Westmorland, procured a foundation scholarship for him at Charterhouse School, where he obtained an exhibition, afterwards going on to study at Emmanuel College, Cambridge. Having been elected to one of the Tancred divinity studentships, he migrated to Christ's College. He graduated as B.A. in 1802, M.A. in 1805, and D.D. in 1824.

He was ordained deacon in 1803 and priest in 1804, with a charge at Thurlby, in Lincolnshire. After a few months he went to live with his parents at King's Cliffe, and undertook the parishes of Ketton and Tixover with Duddington. On 8 January 1807, he was collated by Bishop George Pretyman Tomline to the prebend of Nassington in Lincoln Cathedral. He was subsequently presented by the Earl of Westmorland to the rectory of King's Cliffe, in succession to his father, who had died of paralysis 20 March 1810.

In 1820 he was appointed examining chaplain to George Pelham, the new bishop of Lincoln; and was collated by Pelham, 10 December 1821, to the archdeaconry of Bedford. An order in council, 19 April 1837, transferred it from the Diocese of Lincoln to the Diocese of Ely. In 1827, Bonney was appointed to the deanery of Stamford by his close friend John Kaye, Bishop of Lincoln, and was advanced by Kaye, 22 February 1845, from the archdeaconry of Bedford to that of Lincoln, of which, soon after his appointment, he made a parochial visitation, and wrote an accurate account of every church under his supervision. As an archdeacon Bonney was indefatigable.

In the early part of 1858 he was seized with paralysis, and never entirely recovered. He died at the rectory-house at King's Cliffe on 24 December 1862, and was buried in his wife's grave in the churchyard of Cliffe, where he had contributed to the restoration of the church.

== Works ==
In 1815 Bonney published a biography of the 17th-century cleric and author Jeremy Taylor, with a dedication to the Earl of Westmorland. In 1821 he dedicated to Lady Georgiana Fane his Historic Notices in reference to Fotheringay, Oundle.

Bonney published the Sermons and Charges of Thomas Fanshaw Middleton, Bishop of Calcutta, with Memoirs of his Life, in 1824. He published his own charges to the clergy of the archdeaconry of Bedford for the years 1823, 1843, and 1844, and charges delivered to the clergy and churchwardens of the archdeaconry of Lincoln at the visitations of 1850, 1854, and 1856. In 1846 he also contributed a sermon, "Sacred Music and Psalmody considered", originally preached in Lincoln Cathedral, to the third volume of Practical Sermons by Dignitaries and other Clergymen of the United Church of England and Ireland.

== Visitation records ==
Bonney's visitation notebooks of churches in the Deanery of Bedford 1823–39, and associated historical notes of c.1840, are published, along with near contemporary notes and descriptions by John Martin and Sir Stephen Glynne, and relevant archival records, in the following volumes:

- Pickford, Chris, ed. (1994). Bedfordshire Churches in the Nineteenth Century: part 1: parishes A to G. Bedfordshire Historical Record Society. Vol. 73. Bedford: Bedfordshire Historical Record Society. ISBN 0851550568.
- Pickford, Chris, ed. (1998). Bedfordshire Churches in the Nineteenth Century: part 2: parishes Harlington to Roxton. Bedfordshire Historical Record Society. Vol. 77. Bedford: Bedfordshire Historical Record Society. ISBN 0851550606.
- Pickford, Chris, ed. (2000). Bedfordshire Churches in the Nineteenth Century: part 3: parishes Salford to Yelden. Bedfordshire Historical Record Society. Vol. 79. Bedford: Bedfordshire Historical Record Society. ISBN 0851550630.
- Pickford, Chris, ed. (2001). Bedfordshire Churches in the Nineteenth Century: part 4: appendices and index. Bedfordshire Historical Record Society. Vol. 80. Bedford: Bedfordshire Historical Record Society. ISBN 0851550649.

== Family ==
On 15 May 1827 he married Charlotte, the fourth daughter of John Perry (shipbuilder), who, after a childless union of nearly twenty-four years, died at King's Cliffe 26 December 1850.
