= Alfonso de Valdés =

Spanish humanist (d. 1532)

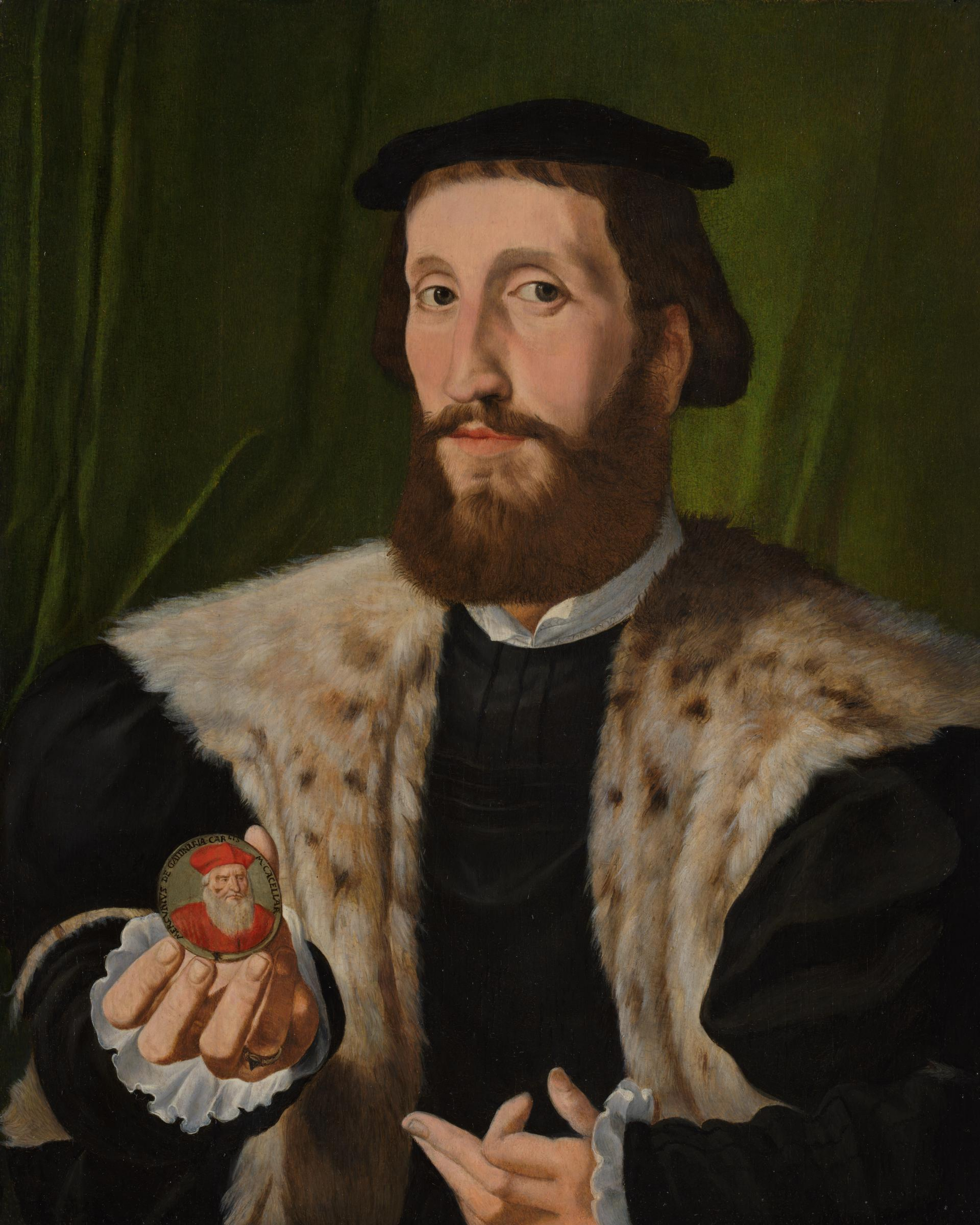
Presumed portrait of Alfonso de Valdes

Alfonso de Valdés (Spanish pronunciation: [alˈfonso ðe βalˈdes]; c. 1490 – October 1532) was a Spanish humanist, who worked at the chancellery of the Emperor Charles V. He was the twin brother of Juan de Valdés.

== Biography ==
Alfonso de Valdés was born c. 1490 in Cuenca, Castile, Spain. Among his ancestors were Jews who had converted to Christianity. His talents gave him early advancement and he accompanied Charles V in 1520 on the journey from Spain to the coronation at Aachen, and in 1521 to the Diet of Worms. From 1522 he was a secretary of the imperial chancellery and as secretary wrote a number of important state papers: in 1525, he drew up the report of the battle of Pavia; in 1526 the energetic, graphic, and at times deliberately sarcastic state paper addressed to Pope Clement VII, in which the faithlessness of the pope is stigmatized, and an appeal is made for the convoking of an Ecumenical Council.

After the capture and sack of Rome in 1527, Valdés wrote the dialogue Lactantius in which he violently attacked the pope as a disturber of the public peace, an instigator of war, and a perfidious deceiver, declared the fate of Rome the judgment of God, and called the Papal States the worst governed dominion in the world. The dialogue was printed in 1529 and was widely read. The papal nuncio at Madrid, Baldassare Castiglione, brought an accusation before the Inquisition, but the trial amounted to nothing because Charles V took his servant under his protection, while the grand inquisitor also declared that it was not heretical to speak against the morals of the pope and the priests. Consequently, it was decided that the dialogue was not calumnious.

Valdés was full of enthusiasm for the ideas of Erasmus of Rotterdam and sought to gain currency for them in Spain. In 1529 he accompanied the emperor to Italy, Germany, and the Netherlands. At the Diet of Augsburg in 1530 he was an influential negotiator with Philip Melanchthon and the Protestants, and met them in a pacific and conciliatory spirit; yet it cannot be said that he shared their views or showed that he understood Martin Luther's motives; his point of view was solely that of a statesman. In October, 1531, he wrote from Brussels the letter of congratulation to the Catholics of Switzerland after the victory over Zwingli.

He died in Vienna in October 1532.
