= Curzon Gate =

Housing development in Birmingham, England

Coordinates: 52°28′56.59″N 1°52′49.46″W

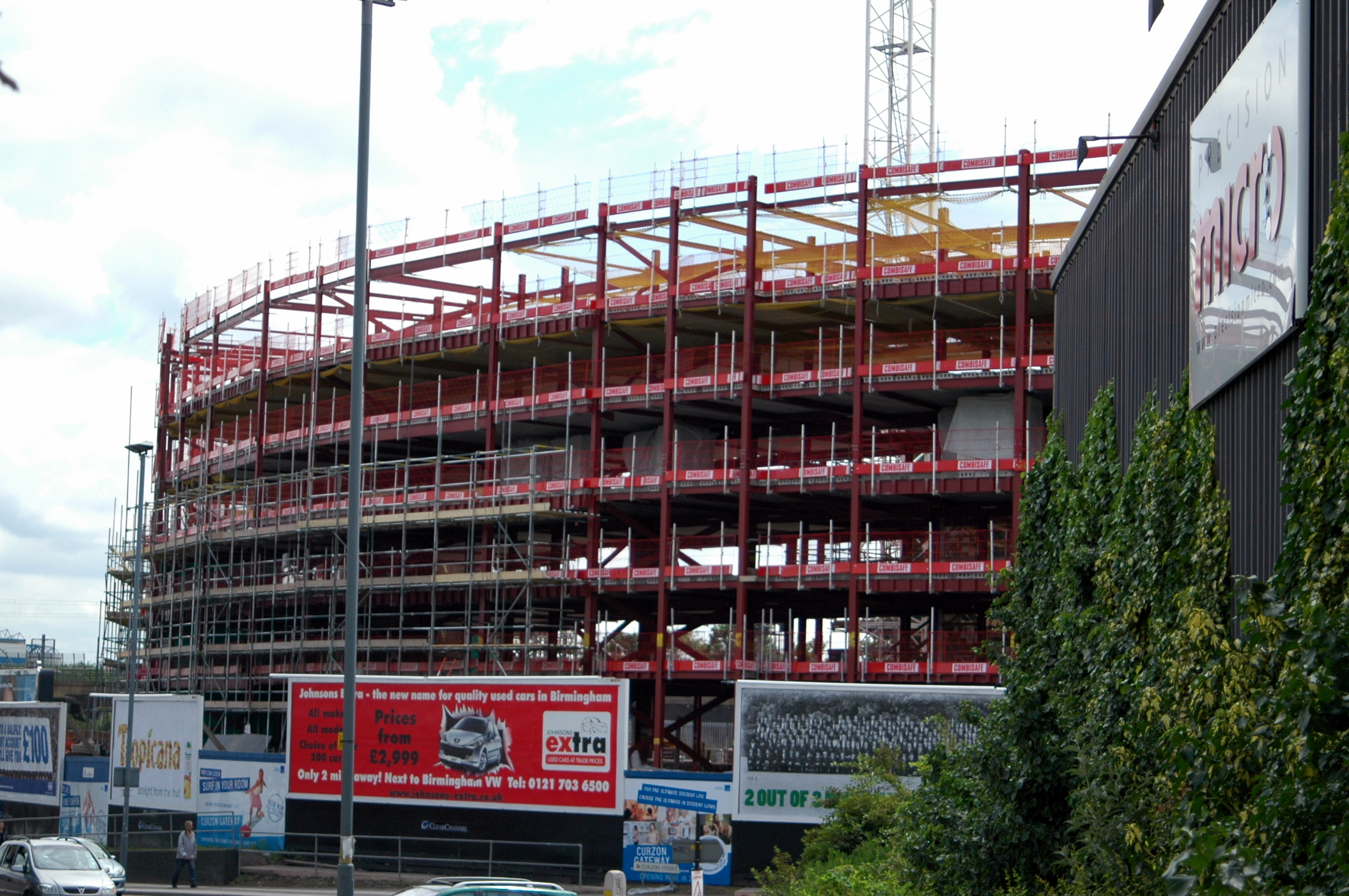
Construction work on Curzon Gate.

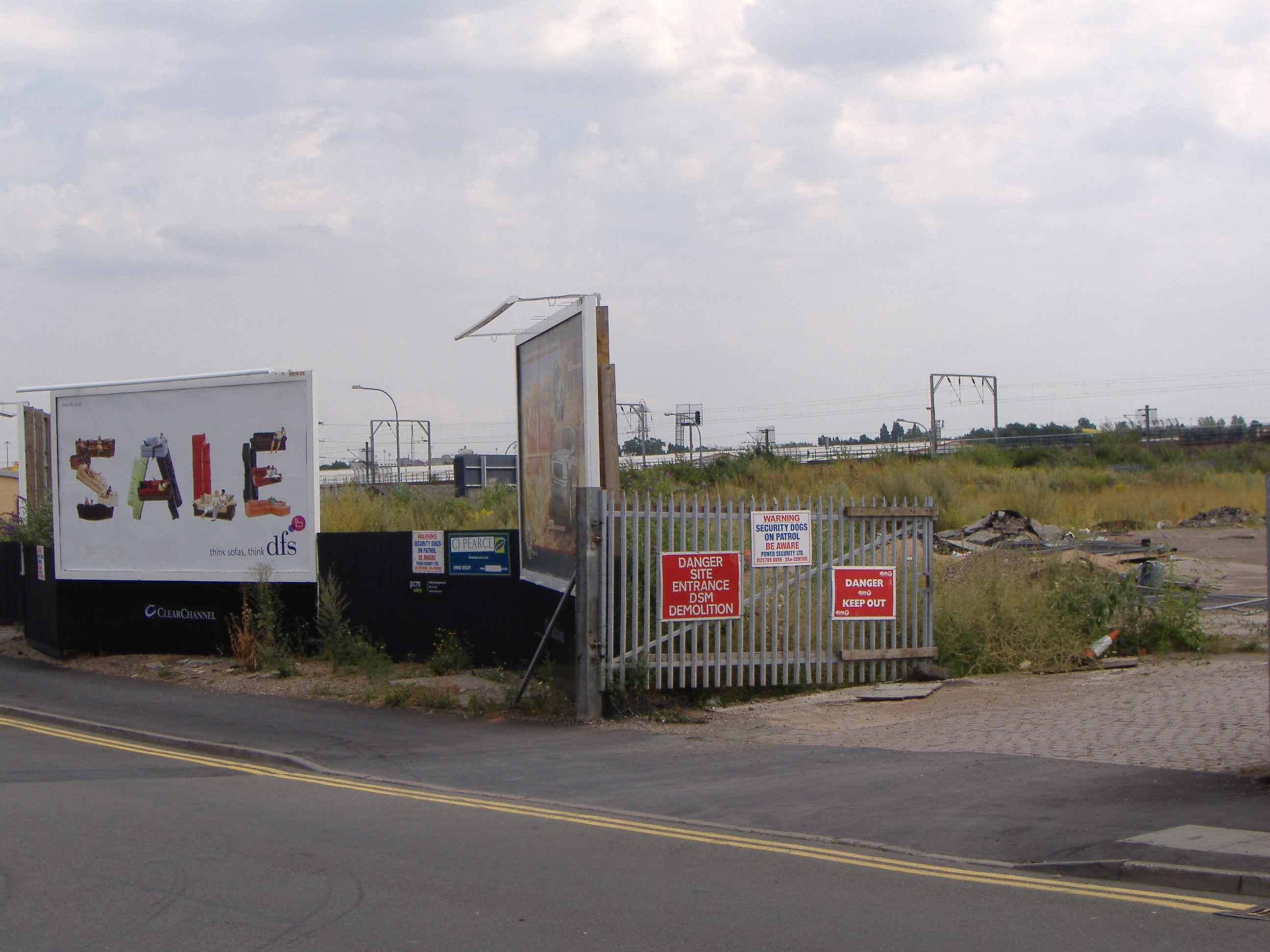
The site prior to start of construction

Curzon Gate (also known as Curzon Gateway) was a residential development located on the edge of Birmingham City Centre, West Midlands, England, on a prominent gateway site into the city centre. The land was formerly occupied by Castle Cement silos. The 4-acre (1.6 ha) site was located in the Eastside area, which is currently witnessing a large-scale regeneration scheme. It was located next to Curzon Park and opposite Eastside Locks, both of which are developments. It was bounded by a railway viaduct to the south and a road junction on the A4540 road. It was separated from Curzon Park by the Digbeth Branch Canal.

The government's plan for High Speed 2, published on 11 March 2010, requires the use of the Curzon Gate site. The development closed to student residents in the summer of 2018 and demolition work has started. Other student accommodation was built in the nearby areas to account for the loss of Curzon Gateway.

The land receives its name from Curzon Street railway station and five underground railway tunnels are located directly underneath the site where they terminate. The extension and reuse of the tunnels had been proposed for railway expansion in Birmingham, however, the proposals did not develop. These railway tunnels terminated at the Digbeth Branch Canal however when the Castle Cement silos were constructed, the tunnels were filled in up to Lawley Middleway.

The developers were the Eastside Partnership and the agent are Drivers Jonas.

== Planning history ==
Initial planning permission was blocked by the High Court following intervention by MacDermid who were given permission previously to store hazardous chemicals on their Eastside site. This meant that all planning applications within a 0.5 kilometres (0.3 mi) radius of their site had to be approved by the Health and Safety Executive. However, Birmingham City Council had ignored the HSE which led to MacDermid appealing to the High Court. However, planning permission was granted later.

On 12 October 2006, an outline planning application for the development was presented before the planning committee who decided to defer it due to Section 106 payments.

Through previous consideration of the application an agreement over the Section 106 issues between Birmingham City Council and the applicant was signed and completed on 31 January 2005. It provided for contributions on the overall site with overall site being defined as the Castle Cement site (which Curzon Gate will be situated on) and the Parcelforce site (which will be covered by Curzon Park).

== Construction ==
The Castle Cement silos were removed in 2005. Phase 1 of the development commenced the following year. Phase 1 consisted of 748 student units as well as community facilities. It was operated by Unite Students, and opened to residents in July 2008.

Phase 1 topped out in January 2008. Phase 2 would have consisted of a 12-storey tower with 260 private dwellings. As well as this, there would have been a two-storey car park with 210 parking spaces, including 13 for disabled drivers, a café on the ground floor of one of the towers, a gym, retail facilities and a public open space. Phase 2 did not begin construction.

== Design ==
The Eastside area was initially masterplanned by HOK International and the Curzon Gate scheme was designed by Hadfield Cawkwell Davidson.

Phase 1 took its shape from the curve of the road junction. The block was of contemporary design with ivory-coloured stonework on the ground and first floor. The upper floors had glazed curtain walling, powder coated windows, galvanised steel balconies and a standing seam roof. The 11 storey block was 31 metres (101.7 ft) tall.

Phase 2 would have had 120 two-bed flats (including seventeen duplex units), 99 one-bed flats (including seventeen duplex units) and 41 studio flats and 210 parking spaces and would have been in a development of the following heights:

- 3–6 storeys fronting the canal with an additional seventh storey at the corner facing the proposed access road (south-western corner of the site)
- 2–7 storeys facing the railway viaduct
- 6–9 storeys fronting on to the new central street
- 12 storey tower fronting on to Curzon Street.

== High Speed 2 and demolition ==
On 11 March 2009 the government announced a plan for a high-speed rail line from London to Birmingham, known as High Speed 2. The rail line would terminate at a new station close to the site of the old Curzon Street railway station.

The report indicated that the Curzon Gate site would be required for the approach tracks to the new station. This would require demolition of the completed Curzon Gateway buildings and cancellation of or major changes to all developments planned in the block of land between Curzon Street and the railway.

The site closed to student residents in summer 2018 and demolition followed.
