= Jeremiah Holmes Wiffen =

English poet and writer (1792–1836)

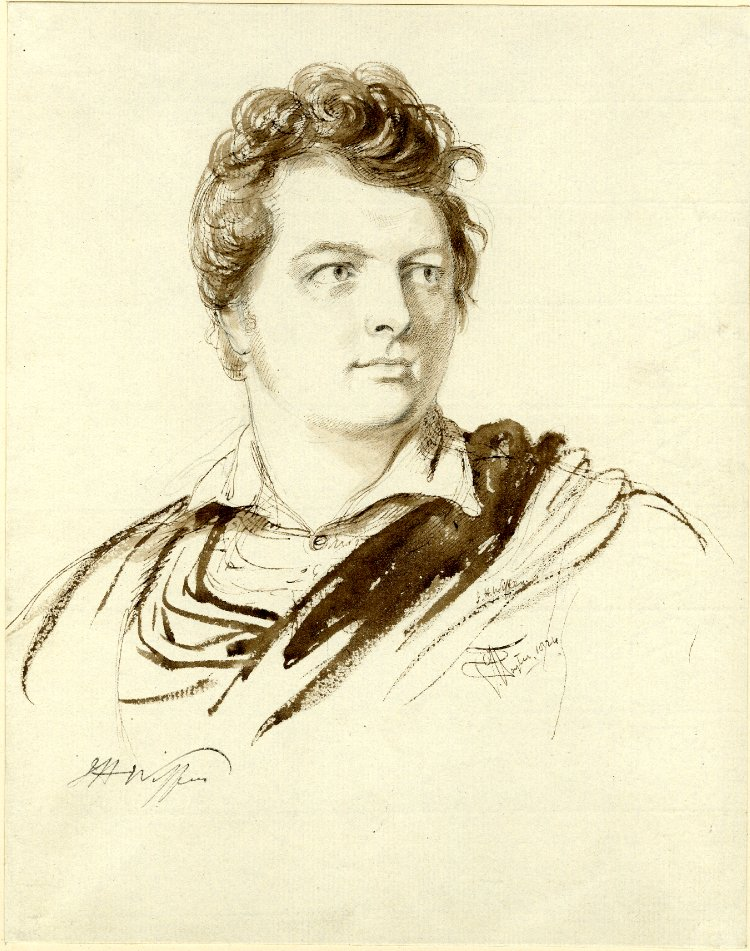
- Pen portrait of Wiffen by George Hayter
- Born: 30 December 1792; Woburn, Bedfordshire, England
- Died: 2 May 1836 (aged 43); Broxfield, Bedfordshire, England
- Education: Ackworth School
- Occupations: Poet; writer
- Spouse: Mary Whitehead (m. 1828)
- Children: 3
- Parent(s): John Wiffen; Elizabeth Pattison
- Relatives: Benjamin Barron Wiffen (brother)

Jeremiah Holmes Wiffen (30 December 1792 – 2 May 1836) was an English poet and writer, known as translator of Torquato Tasso.

== Life ==
The eldest son of John Wiffen, an ironmonger, by his wife Elizabeth Pattison, both from Quaker backgrounds, he was born at Woburn, Bedfordshire, on 30 December 1792; Benjamin Barron Wiffen was his younger brother, and his youngest sister Priscilla married Alaric Alexander Watts. His father died young, leaving six children to Elizabeth's care. At the age of ten Jeremiah entered Ackworth School in Yorkshire, where he acquired some skill in wood engraving.

At age 14, Wiffen was apprenticed to Isaac Payne, a schoolmaster at Epping, Essex. In 1811 he returned to Woburn and opened a school in Leighton Road. By hard study he made himself at home in the classics and Hebrew, French, and Italian, and later, Spanish and Welsh. On a visit to the Lake District with his brother in the summer of 1819 he made the acquaintance of Robert Southey and of William Wordsworth, whose "white pantaloons" and "hawk's nose" are described in his diary. In the summer of 1821 he was appointed librarian at Woburn Abbey to John Russell, 6th Duke of Bedford.

Wiffen declined the degree of LL.D. from Aberdeen University in 1827. His death was sudden, at Froxfield, near Woburn, on 2 May 1836; he was buried on 8 May in the Friends' graveyard, Woburn Sands, Buckinghamshire.

== Works ==
Wiffen's first appearance in print was in the European Magazine of October 1807, with an Address to the Evening Star versified from Ossian. His first contribution on an antiquarian subject was an account of Broxbourne church, Hertfordshire, with an etching by himself.

With James Baldwin Brown the elder and Thomas Raffles, Wiffen published Poems by Three Friends (1813); the joint authorship was acknowledged in the second edition (1815). With his brother he published Elegiac Lines (1818) commemorating William Thompson, Quaker schoolmaster of Penketh, Lancashire. His earliest independent volume was Aonian Hours (1819, dedicated to his brother; 2nd ed. 1820). His next book was Julia Alpinula … and other Poems (1820, dedicated to Alaric Watts; 2nd ed. 1820).

In 1821 Wiffen issued "Proposals" for publishing by subscription a new translation of Tasso in Spenserian verse. As a specimen, the fourth book of Jerusalem Delivered was published in 1821, with a dissertation on existing translations. His next work in verse was a translation of The Works of Garcilasso de la Vega, 1823, dedicated to the Duke of Bedford, with a life of Garcilaso de la Vega, and an essay on Spanish poetry. The publication of the completed version of Jerusalem Delivered was delayed by a fire in the printing office; it appeared in 1824, dedicated to the Duchess of Bedford, with a life of Tasso and a list of English crusaders, 2 vols. The Quarterly Review concluded that Wiffen, as a translator of Tasso, was ahead of John Hoole and James Leigh Hunt, but some way behind Edward Fairfax.

Wiffen's other poetical works were:

- Verses … on the Alameda, 1827;
- Appeal for the Injured African, Newcastle upon Tyne, 1833; and
- Verses … at Woburn Abbey, on … the statues of Locke and Erskine, 1836.

Eight years' work went into Wiffen's compilation of Historical Memoirs of the House of Russell, 1833, 2 vols. He made some of the researches over a four months' tour in Normandy. Other publications were a Geographical Primer (1812), and Thoughts on the Creation, Fall, and Regeneration, 1826, by John Humbles, "a Bedfordshire peasant" which Wiffen edited. A selection of his poems and ballads was given in The Brothers Wiffen (1880), by S. R. Pattison.

== Family ==
Wiffen married Mary Whitehead, on 28 November 1828, at the Friends' meeting-house in Leeds. They had three daughters.

== Notes ==
Attribution

This article incorporates text from a publication now in the public domain: Lee, Sidney, ed. (1900). "Wiffen, Jeremiah Holmes". Dictionary of National Biography. Vol. 61. London: Smith, Elder & Co.
