= Eastside Locks =

Mixed-use development in Birmingham, England

Coordinates: 52°29′3.22″N 1°53′0.05″W

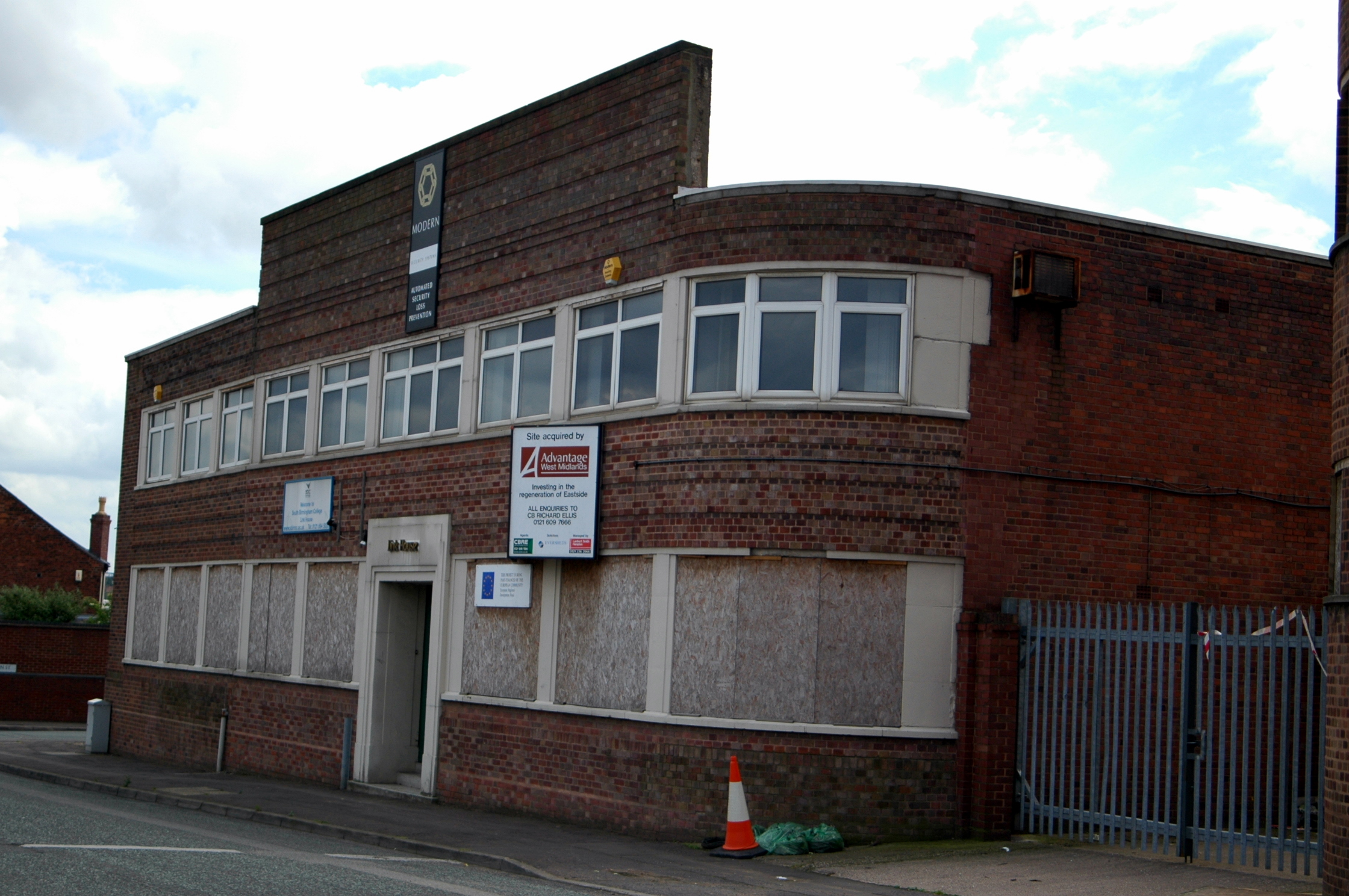
A building purchased for demolition and redevelopment in the Eastside Locks area

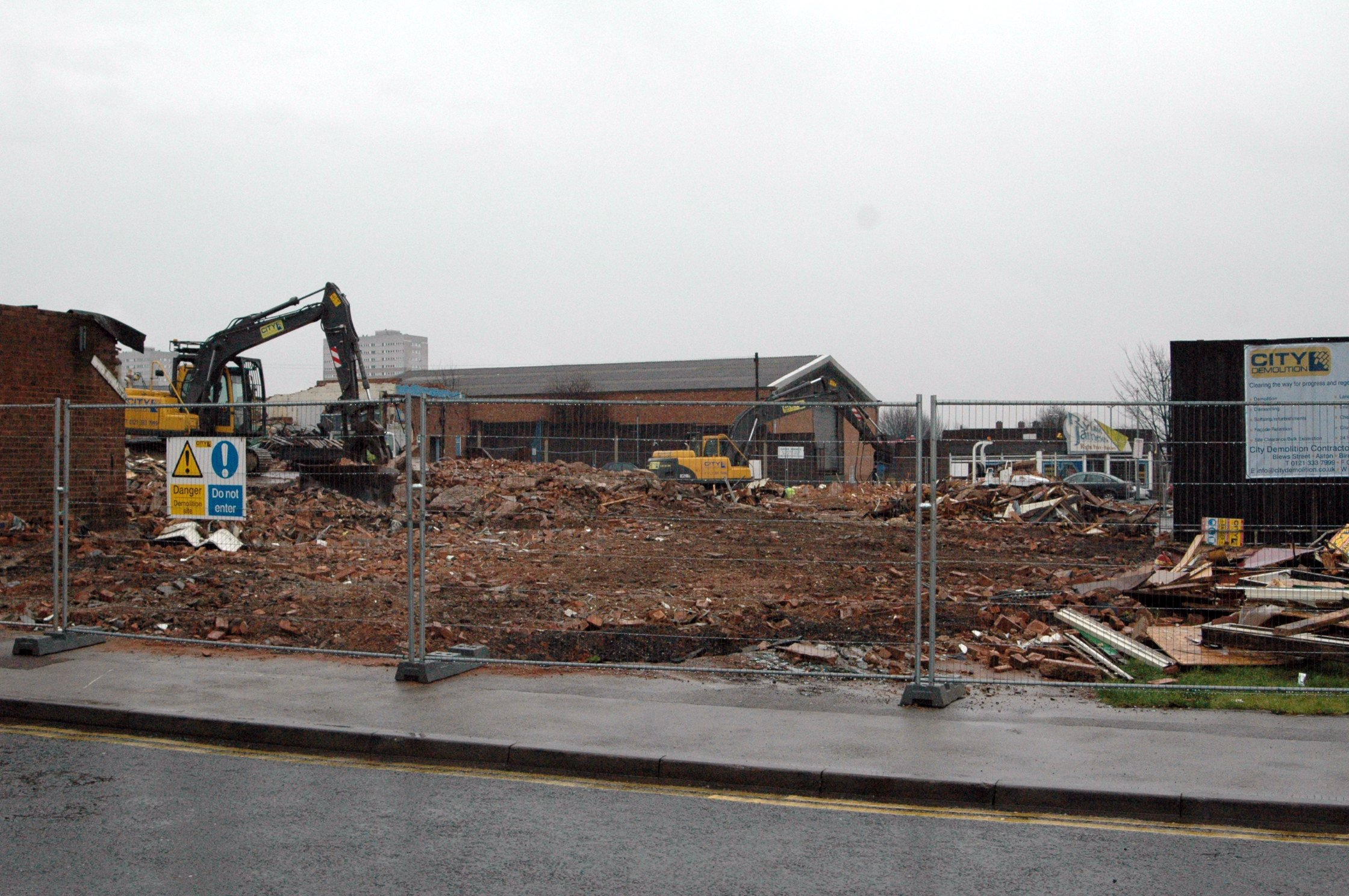
Demolition work on the Eastside Locks site. c. February 2007

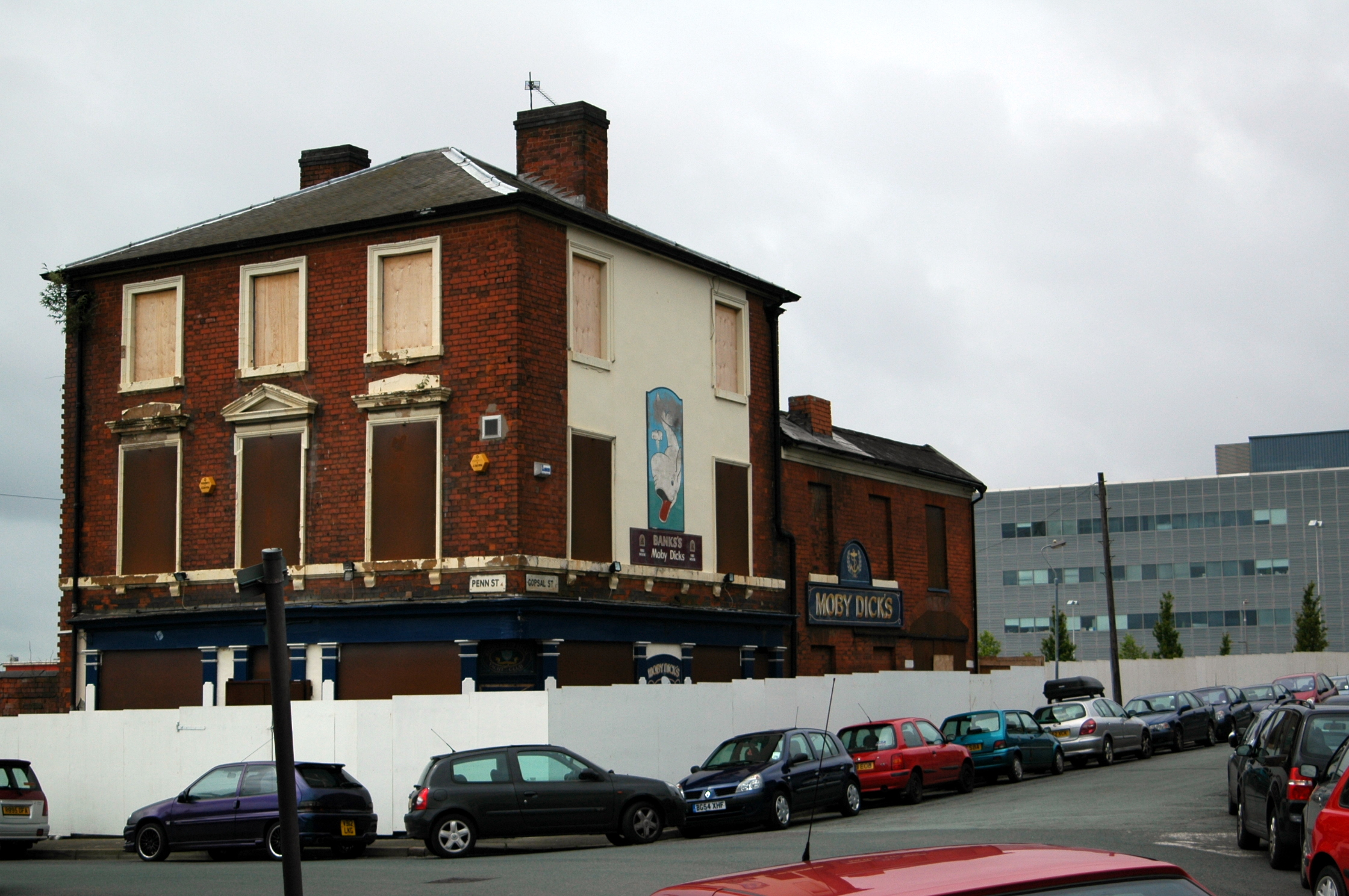
The derilict Moby Dicks pub, later reopened as the Eagle & Ball

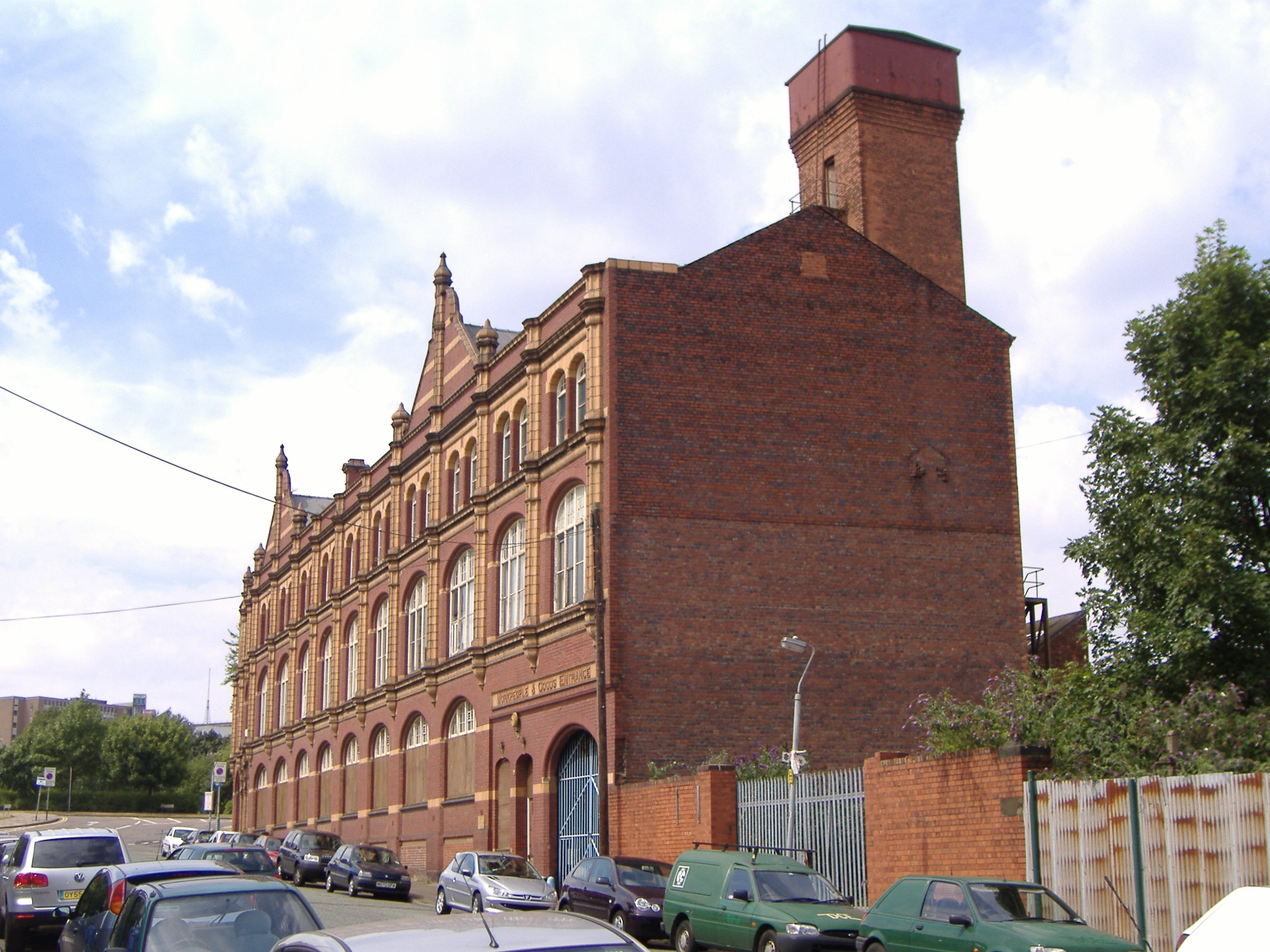
The former Co-op furniture factory before being destroyed by fire and strong winds

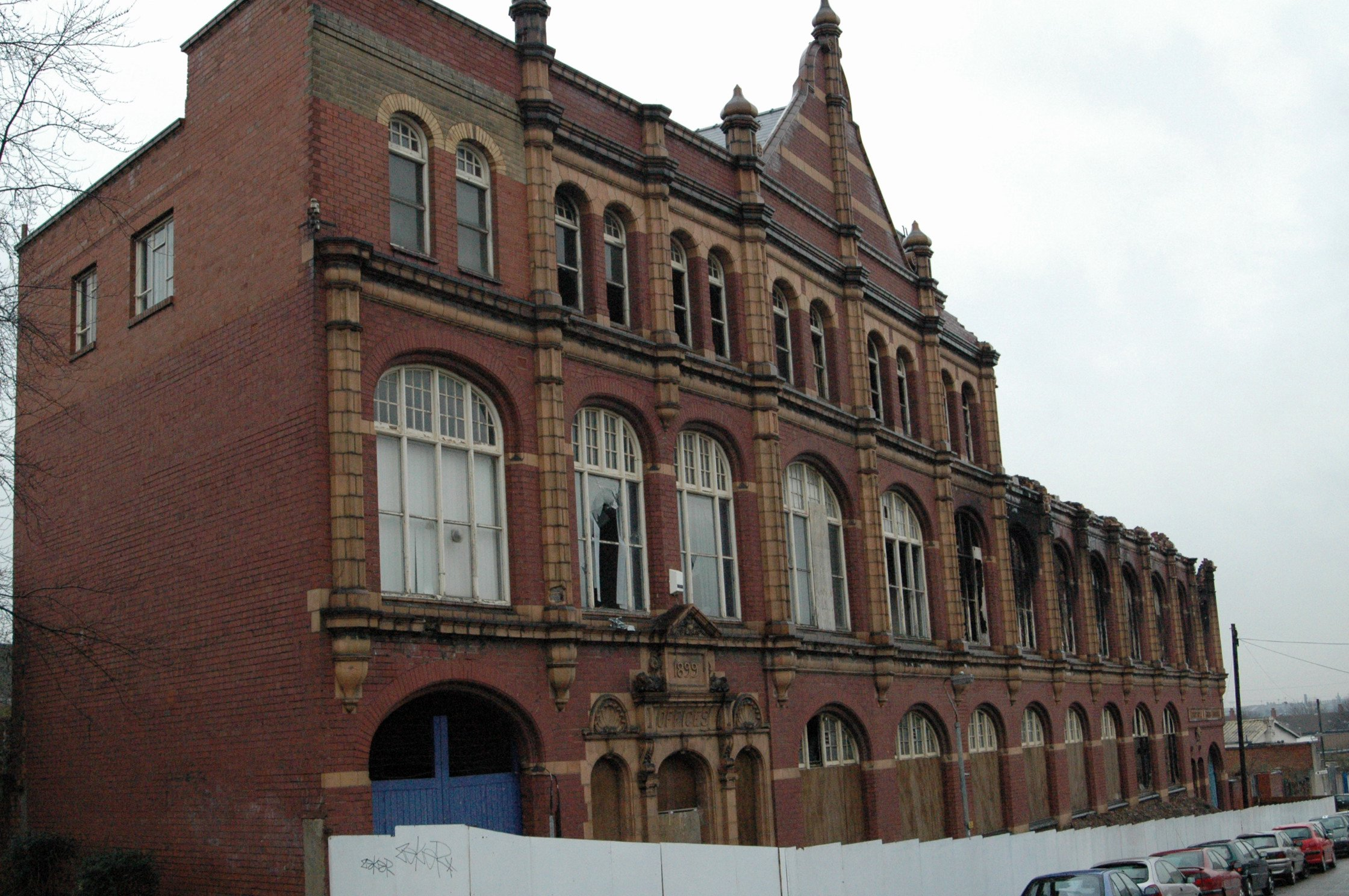
The former Co-op furniture factory after being destroyed by fire and strong winds. Clearance work has commenced to the back of the building.

Eastside Locks (originally known as Ventureast) is a major mixed-use development in the Eastside area of Birmingham, England. It is located next to the City Park development and opposite Curzon Gate. It is alongside the already completed Millennium Point and will cover the area to the rear of the building (now used as a car park) on top of the area alongside the road. It covers an area of 15.24 acres (6.17 ha). A replacement car park will be a multistorey building fronting Jennens Road.

The current site was occupied by warehouse units, the Digbeth Branch Canal, a listed pub and pumping station. On AB Row was a locally listed Victorian former Co-op furniture factory which was severely damaged on 11 January 2007 in a suspected arson attack. The roof collapsed and 75% of the building was damaged by the fire which also destroyed seven arched windows. On 18 January 2007 the façade of the building, which had survived the fire albeit smoke damaged, collapsed in on itself in high winds due to the lack of support it received after the fire was put out.

The area has been hailed as the most important development scheme in Eastside by Birmingham City Council due to the variety of uses it will provide. It has also been billed as being one of the largest regeneration schemes within walking distance of a city centre in the United Kingdom. The canal, which is protected by the Warwick Bar Conservation Area will remain in the development. A Development Framework produced for the area stated that the canal would form the hub of the residential and hotel area. It also stated that the buildings will range from two to eight storeys. It proposed that a square, named Exchange Square, will be located at the back of Millennium Point and sketch designs were provided with it.

Demolition of buildings on the site began in mid-January 2007. Demolition has continued on into early 2008.

The scheme was relaunched at the 2008 MIPIM property show in Cannes, France, in March 2008 as Eastside Locks to reflect the canalside character of the site. Goodman, the developers, propose that the scheme will consist of 675,000 sq ft (62,700 m^{2}) of Grade A office space. The rest of Eastside Locks is likely to consist of 325,000 sq ft (30,200 m^{2}) of apartments, shops, leisure space and a hotel. It is estimated that a total of 5,000 jobs will be created as a result of the development.

A proposal for a 175-metre (498 ft) tall observation tower named the "Pinnacle Tower" were presented to the public in early 2006. This will be located on Curzon Road on what was part of the Ventureast site. The tower was redesigned with more detailed designs were presented to the public in September 2006, before being redesigned again and being relaunched as VTP200.
