= Juan de Valdés =

Spanish writer (died 1541)

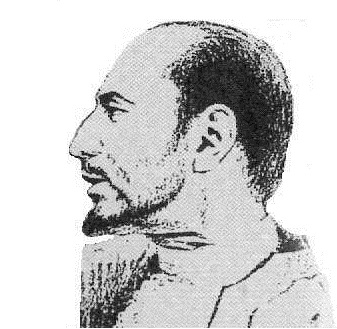
Juan de Valdés

Juan de Valdés (c.1490 – August 1541) was a Spanish religious writer and Catholic reformer.

He was the younger of twin sons of Fernando de Valdés, hereditary regidor of Cuenca in Castile, where Valdés was born. He has been confused with his twin brother Alfonso (a courtier of Charles V, Holy Roman Emperor, who attended Charles's coronation in Aachen in 1520 and was Latin secretary of state from 1524). Alfonso died in 1532 in Vienna.

== Biography ==
Juan probably studied at the University of Alcalá.

He was speculated to be the anonymous author of a politico-religious Diálogo de Mercurio y Carón, written and published about 1528, though only the reprint (in 1850) was ascribed to him, while the original was credited to Alphonso de Valdes, his brother. A passage in this work may have suggested Don Quixote's advice to Sancho Panza on appointment to his governorship. The Diálogo attacked the corruptions of the Roman Church; hence Valdés, in fear of the Spanish Inquisition, left Spain for Naples, also ruled by the King of Spain at the time, in 1530.

In 1531 he moved to Rome, where his criticisms of papal policy were condoned, since in his Diálogo he had upheld the validity of Henry VIII's marriage with Catherine of Aragon. On 12 January 1533 he writes from Bologna, in attendance upon Pope Clement VII. From the autumn of 1533 he made Naples his permanent residence, his name being Italianized as Valdésso and Val d'Esso. Confusion with his brother may account for the statement (without evidence) of his appointment by Charles V as secretary to the viceroy at Naples, Don Pedro de Toledo; there is no proof of his holding any official position, though Curione (in 1544) writes of him as "cavalliere di Cesare." His house on the Chiaja was the centre of a literary and religious circle; his conversations and writings (circulated in manuscript) stimulated the desire for a spiritual reformation of the church.

His first production at Naples was a philological treatise, Diálogo de la Lengua (1535). His works entitle him to a foremost place among Spanish prose writers. His friends urged him to seek distinction as a humanist, but his bent was towards problems of Biblical interpretation in their bearing on the devout life. Vermigli (Peter Martyr) and Marcantonio Flaminio were leading spirits in his coterie, which included the marchioness of Pescara Vittoria Colonna (April 1490; a widow since 1525 – 25 February 1547, aged 57), since 1537, and her younger widowed sister-in-law, Giulia Gonzaga, (1513; marries 1526, aged 13; a widow since 1529, aged 16 – 16 April 1566, aged 53).

His influence was great on Ochino, for whose sermons he furnished themes. Pietro Carnesecchi, (24 December 1508 – 1 October 1567), burned by the Inquisition in 1567, who had known Valdés at Rome as "a modest and well-bred courtier," found him at Naples (1540) "wholly intent upon the study of Holy Scripture," translating portions into Spanish from Hebrew and Greek, with comments and introductions. To him Carnesecchi ascribes his own adoption of the Evangelical doctrine of justification by faith, and at the same time his rejection of the policy of the Lutheran schism. Valdés died at Naples in May 1541.

His death scattered his band of associates. Abandoning the hope of a regenerated Catholicism, Ochino and Vermigli left Italy. Some of Valdés's writings were by degrees published in Italian translations.

== Thought ==
Showing much originality and penetration, Valdés' writing combine a delicate vein of semi-mystical spirituality with the personal charm attributed to their author in all contemporary notices. Llorente traces in Valdés the influence of Tauler; any such influence must have been at second hand. The Aviso on the interpretation of Scripture, based on Tauler, was probably the work of Alfonso. Valdés was in relations with Fra Benedetto of Mantua, the anonymous author of Del Benefizio di Gesù Cristo Crocefisso, revised by Flaminio (reprinted by Dr Babington, Cambridge, 1855).

=== Possible reformism ===
The suggestion that Valdés departed from Catholic Orthodoxy about the Trinity was first made in 1567 by the Transylvanian bishop, Ferenc Dávid; it has been adopted by Christopher Sandius (1684), Wallace (1850) and other nontrinitarian writers, and is countenanced by Bayle. To this view some colour is given by isolated expressions in his writings, and by the subsequent course of Ochino (whose heterodox repute rests, however, on the insight with which he presented objections). Gaston Bonet-Maury (1842–1919) comments: "Valdés never discusses the Trinity (even when commenting on Matt, xxviii. 19), reserving it (in his Latte Spirituale) as a topic for advanced Christians; yet he explicitly affirms the consubstantiality of the Son, whom he unites in doxologies with the Father and the Holy Spirit" (Opusc. p. 145). Practical theology interested him more than speculative, his aim being the promotion of a healthy and personal piety.

== Works ==
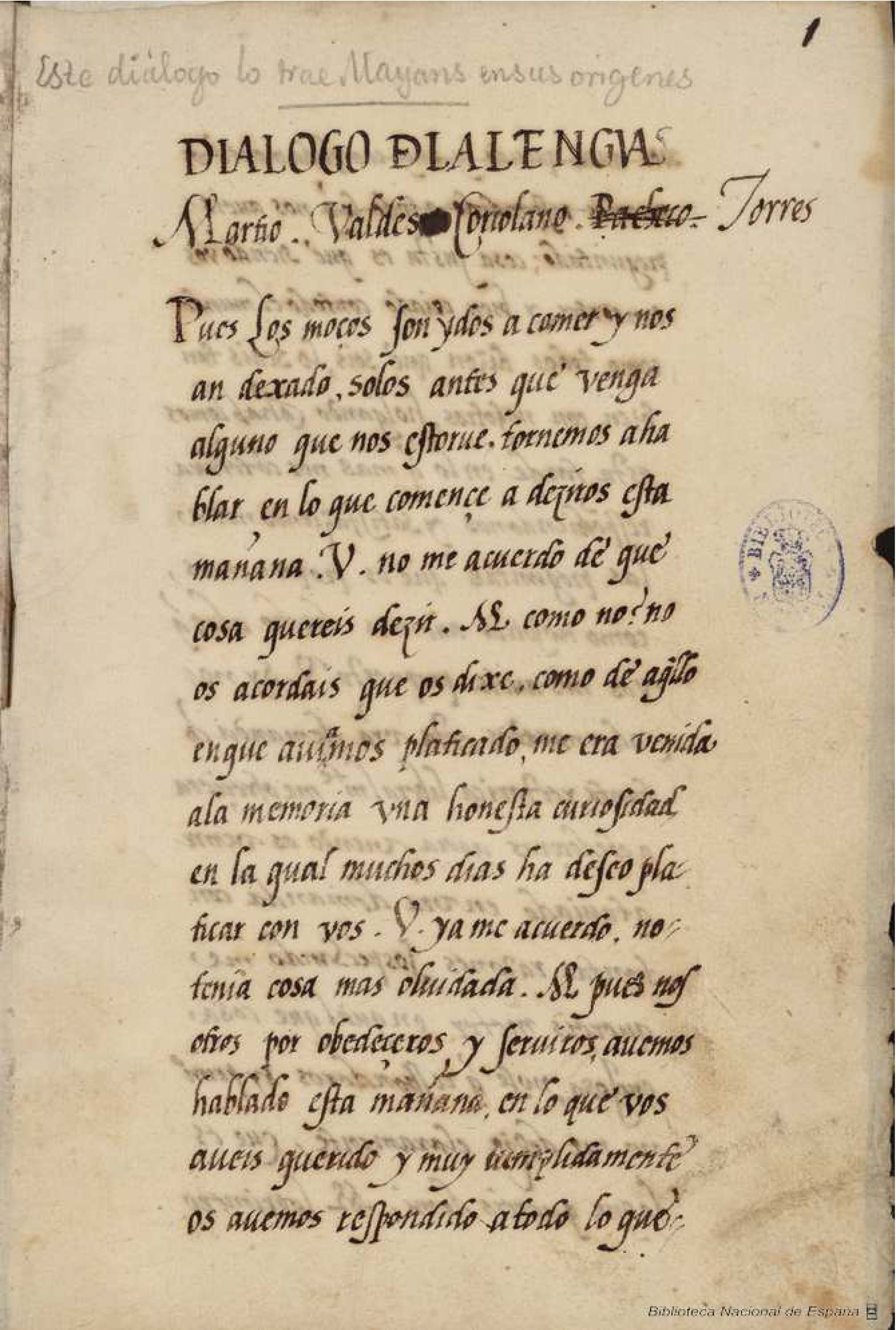
Cover page of Diálogo de la lengua. Manuscript in Biblioteca Nacional de España.

- Diálogo de Lactancio y un Arcediano, also known as: Diálogo de las cosas ocurridas en Roma, ca. 1527, as well as Diálogo de Mercurio y Carón, ca. 1528, by Juan's brother: Alfonso de Valdés, are ascribed to Juan in the reprint, Dos Diálogos (in Spanish), 1850. An Italian translation (by Niccolò Franco ?) of both works was printed in Venice (1545) as Due dialoghi.
- Diálogo de la Lengua (in Spanish), Madrid (published 1737), 1873 [1533].
- Trataditos (in Spanish), Bonn, 1881, from a manuscript in the Palatine Library, Vienna; Cinque Tratatelli Evangelici (in Italian), Rome, 1869 [1545]; Betts, JT (1882), XVII Opuscules (translation).
- Alfabeto Christiano (in Italian), c. 1535. First printing: Venice (1546). English translation Alfabeto Christiano by Benjamin Barron Wiffen (1861); no Spanish original is known.
- Qual Maniera si dovrebbe tenere in formare gli figliuoli de Christiani delle Cose della Religione (in Italian) (not later than 1545: a page was used by the Venetian edition (1545) of John Calvin's Catéchisme de l'Eglise de Genève). English translation into Valdés' Two Catechisms. No known Spanish original.
- Ciento i Diez Consideraciones (in Spanish); all copies of the original edition suppressed by the Spanish Inquisition; thirty-nine of the "Consideraciones", Trataditos (manuscript), Vienna.
- Seven Doctrinal Letters (original published with the Trataditos from Vienna manuscript), in English, by JT Betts, with the Opuscules.
- Comentario Breve... sobre la Epístola de San Pablo a los Romanos, Venice, 1556 (with text; edited by Juan Pérez de Pineda); reprinted, 1856; in English, by J. T. Betts, 1883.
- Comentario Breve... sobre la Primera Epístola de san Pablo a los Corintios, Venice, 1557.
- El Evangelio de San Mateo (text and commentary), 1881, from Vienna manuscript; in English, by JT Betts, 1883.
- El Salterio (the Psalms from Hebrew into Spanish), published with the Trataditos from Vienna manuscript.
- At Vienna is an unpublished commentary in Spanish on Psalms i.–xli.
- Christopher Sandius in his Bibliotheca antitrinitariorum (1684) mentions a commentary on St John's Gospel, not known to exist.

== Sources ==
Notices of Valdés are in Sandius, Christopher (1684), Bibliotheca antitrinitariorum, Bayle and Wallace, Robert (1850), Antitrinitarian Biography. Revival of interest in him is due to

- McCrie, Thomas (1827), History of Reformation in Italy.
- ——— (1829), History of Reformation in Spain.

Fuller knowledge of his career was opened up by Benjamin B. Wiffen, whose Life of Valdés is prefixed to Betts's translation of the Considerations, 1865. Discoveries have since been made in the Aulic Library, Vienna, by Edward Boehmer:

- Boehmer, Edward (1874), Spanish Reformers of Two Centuries.
- ——— (1882), Lives of J. and A. de Valdés
- ——— (1885), Realencyklopedie fur prot. Theol. und Kirche (in German).

=== See also ===
- Young, M (1860), Aonio Palearso.
- Benrath, K (1875), Bernardino Ochino.
- Menéndez y Pelayo, Marcelino (1880), Historia de los heterodoxos españoles.
- Bonet-Maury, Amy Gaston Bonet-Maury (1884), Early Sources of English Unitarian Christianity, Hall EP, trans.
- Barry Collett, Italian Benedictine Scholars and the Reformation,1985
- Crews, Daniel (2008), Twilight of the Renaissance: The Life of Juan de Valdés.
- Firpo, Massimo (2015), Juan de Valdés and the Italian Reformation.
