= Church of St Mary the Virgin, Ketton =

Church in Ketton, Rutland, England

Coordinates: 52°37′39″N 0°33′03″W

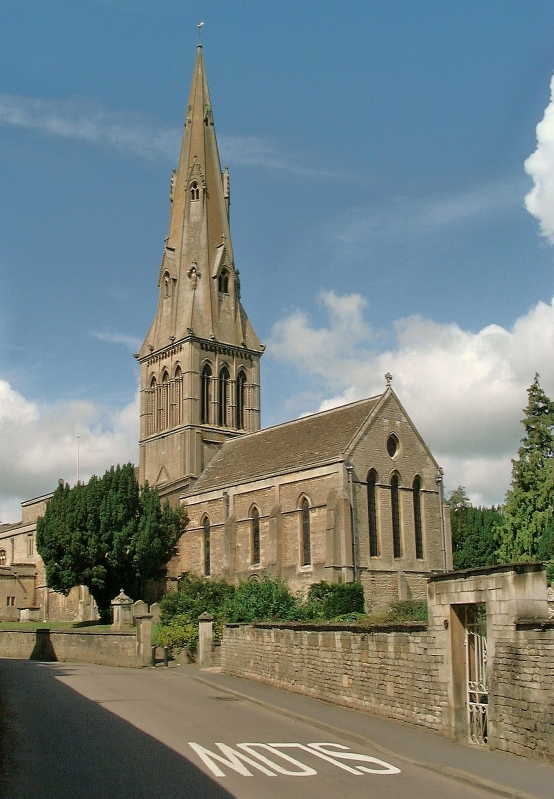
- Denomination: Church of England
- Website: www.kettonstmary.org.uk

History
- Dedication: St Mary the Virgin

Administration
- Diocese: Peterborough
- Parish: Ketton, Rutland

Clergy
- Vicar(s): Olwen Woolcock

The Church of St Mary the Virgin is a church in Ketton, Rutland. The Church of England parish church is a Grade I listed building.

== History ==
The church is the only one in Rutland that is cruciform in plan with a central tower. The 148ft spire is on four arches with triple shafts. The spire and tower date from the 14th century. There is an arched frieze and broach spire which has statues of the Blessed Virgin Mary, St Peter, St Paul and Angel Gabriel.

There is a nave with south and north aisles separated by arcades, a vestry, a chancel, north and south transepts and the tower. The clerestory was added in the 15th century. From 1861 to 1862 the church was restored by George Gilbert Scott, and the chancel was restored in 1863. The roof, decorated with angels, was designed by Sir Charles Nicholson and completed in 1950 after his death.

The font, dating from the 14th century, is octagonal.

The east windows of the chancel and south aisle have stained glass designed by Ninian Comper. A medieval wooden door with a statue and niche of the Blessed Virgin and Child is on the south porch.

An arched doorway dating to c. 1190 is at the west end of the nave.

The tower (completed in 1862) and spire (1867) of Leicester Cathedral are, according to Pevsner, loosely based on Ketton's.

== Sources ==
- Pevsner, Nikolaus (1960). Leicestershire and Rutland. The Buildings of England. Harmondsworth: Penguin Books.
