= John Orrin Smith =

British engraver

John Orrin Smith (1799 – 15 October 1843 London) was a British wood engraver.

== Life ==
Born in Colchester, Smith went to London about 1818, and spent a short time training as an architect. Coming of age in 1821, he inherited some money, and bought a part-proprietorship in a newspaper, The Sunday Monitor, on which Douglas Jerrold worked as a compositor. By the time he was 24, he found himself penniless. William Harvey then instructed him in wood-engraving. Orrin Smith had previously been a pupil of Samuel Williams.

In 1842 Smith took into partnership William James Linton. Smith and Linton did much work for the Illustrated London News, and illustrated books, including Whist, its History and Practice, from designs by Kenny Meadows (1843). Smith died of apoplexy on 15 October 1843, at 11 Mabledon Place, Burton Crescent, London.

== Works ==
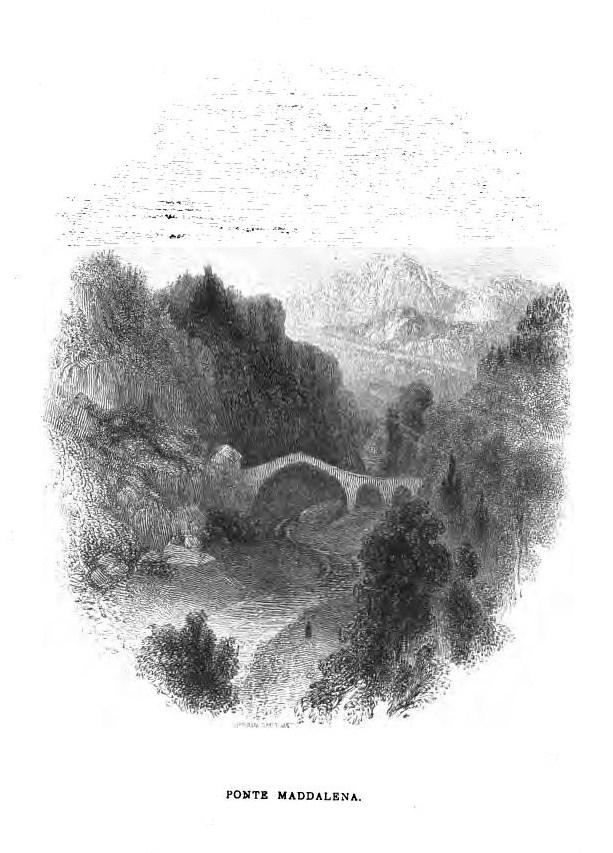
The Ponte della Maddalena, illustration from The Solace of Song by John Orrin Smith

After much hack-work, Smith was employed by Léon Curmer of Paris to engrave a number of the woodblocks for his edition of Paul et Virginie (1835). In 1837 he prepared prints for John Antes Latrobe's The Solace of Song (Seeley & Burnside), a new departure in wood-engraving with a finish contrasting with the crisp work of Luke Clennell, Charlton Nesbit, and John Thompson. His contribution to the technique of wood-engraving was admired by contemporary commentators including one, writing in the London and Westminster Review in 1838, that Orrin Smith was an "able and intelligent cultivator of his art, and has introduced improvements and attempted effects ... which have advanced it." His work was routinely published in both London and Paris.

There followed, with other work:

- Johann Gottfried Herder's : Der Cid nach spanischen Romanzen, published at Stuttgart, 1839;
- an English edition of Paul et Virginie, 1840;
- Christopher Wordsworth's Greece, 1840–1;
- Heads of the People, by Kenny Meadows;
- Shakespeare's Works, in 1839–43, with nearly 1,000 designs by Kenny Meadows.

The last two works were part-owned by Smith, with Meadows and Henry Vizetelly.

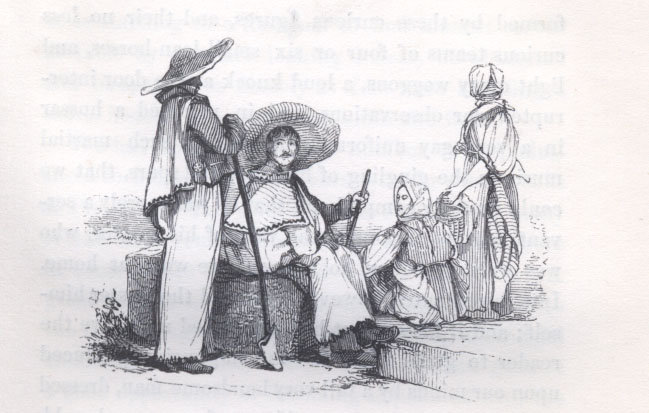
Slavic peasants in Hungary, from John Paget, Hungary and Transylvania (1839), engraving by John Orrin Smith

== Family ==
In 1821 Smith married Jane Elizabeth, daughter of Joseph Barney. His widow survived him with four children. One of his daughters, Caroline Orrin Smith, married Matthew Somerville Morgan. His son, Harvey Edward Orrin Smith, also practised wood-engraving, but then became a director of the firm of James Burn & Co., bookbinders.

== Notes ==
Attribution

This article incorporates text from a publication now in the public domain: Lee, Sidney, ed. (1898). "Smith, John Orrin". Dictionary of National Biography. Vol. 53. London: Smith, Elder & Co.
