= Thomas Miller (poet) =

English poet and novelist (1807–1874)

- Born: 31 August 1807; Gainsborough, Lincolnshire, England
- Died: 24 October 1874 (aged 67); England
- Occupations: Poet, novelist
- Writing career
- Language: English
- Genres: Poetry, novels
- Notable works: Songs of the Sea Nymphs; Godfrey Malvern

Thomas Miller (31 August 1807 – 24 October 1874) was an English poet and novelist who explored rural subjects. He was one of the most prolific English working-class writers of the 19th century and produced in all over 45 volumes, including some "penny dreadfuls" on urban crime.

== Early life ==
Miller was born in Gainsborough, Lincolnshire, the son of George Miller, an unsuccessful wharfinger and ship-owner, who deserted his wife and two sons in 1810. Thomas grew up in Sailors Alley, Gainsborough. His childhood friends included the future poet and journalist Thomas Cooper. He attended the White Hart Charity School. Although he left school at nine, he became a voracious reader. His love of the countryside was reinforced by summers spent on his grandfather's farm.

Miller found work as a ploughboy, then as a shoemaker's apprentice, but he was released from his indentures after he threw "an iron instrument" at his vicious and tyrannical master. He was then apprenticed as a basket-maker to his stepfather.

When Miller had completed his apprenticeship, he moved to Nottingham in 1831 to set up a basket-making business. There he published his first writings, Songs of the Sea Nymphs (1832), which he dedicated to Lady Blessington. Godfrey Malvern (1842) has been called "his most interesting novel... telling the story of a poor schoolmaster who enters the London literary world."

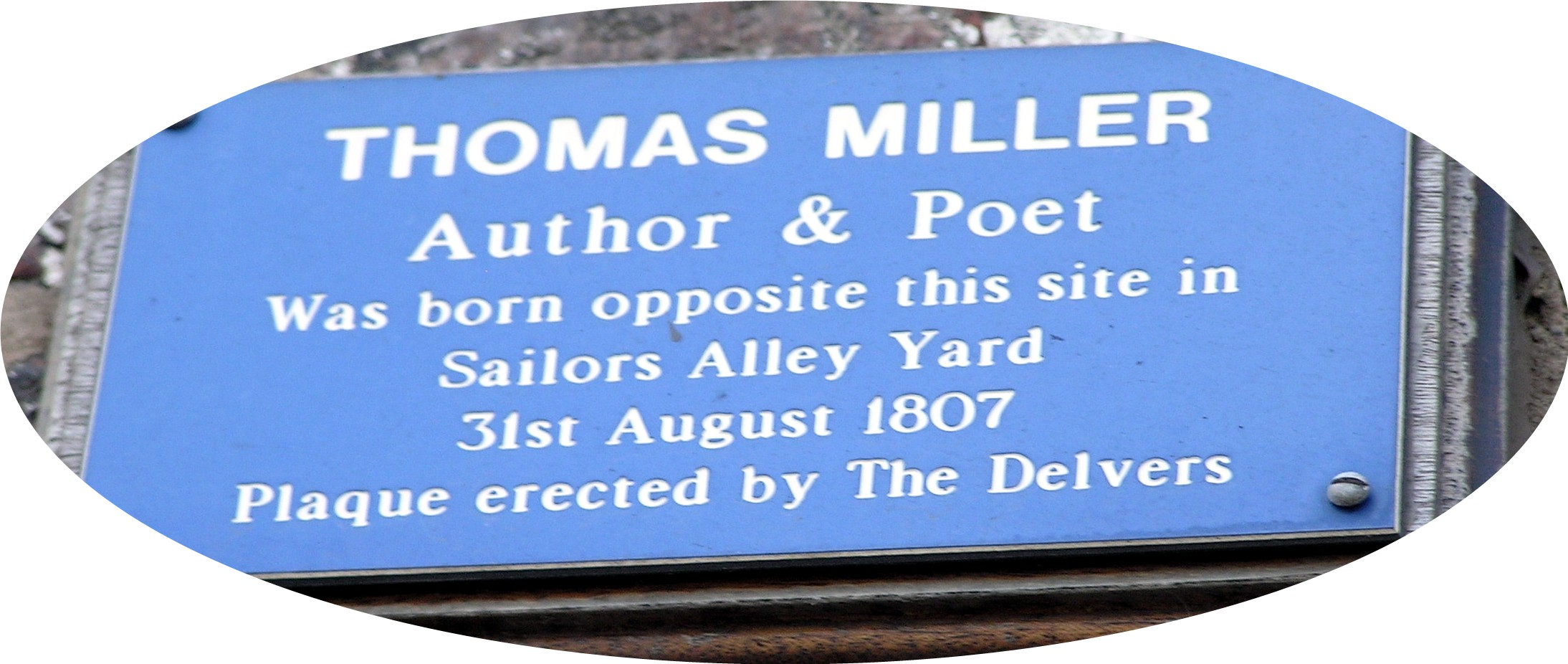
Plaque at 58 Bridge Street, Gainsborough, opposite Thomas Miller's birthplace at Sailors Alley Yard (which no longer exists)

== London poverty ==
After moving to London he was befriended by Lady Blessington and by Samuel Rogers, and for a time engaged in business as a bookseller, but was unsuccessful and then devoted himself exclusively to literature, producing over 45 volumes, including novels, in which he successfully delineated rural characters and scenes. Among them were Royston Gower (1838), Gideon Giles the Roper, Rural Sketches and Pictures of Country Life, illustrated by Samuel Williams. He contributed a series to the run of "penny dreadfuls" entitled The Mysteries of London, which depict urban crime.

Although Miller attracted some patronage and some sums from the Royal Literary Fund, he was often in financial need. He appealed directly to Charles Dickens for assistance in 1851, but Dickens declined and wrote to his friend Bulwer Lytton, "I fear he [Miller] has mistaken his vocation."

Miller had a wife and four children: Henry, George, Emma and Ellen. He died of a stroke at his home at 24 New Street, Kensington, on 24 October 1874 and was buried in West Norwood Cemetery. He was survived by one of his sons and his two spinster daughters.

== Evening (The Poem) ==
The day is past, the sun is set,
And the white stars are in the sky;
While the long grass with dew is wet,
And through the air the bats now fly.

The lambs have now lain down to sleep,
The birds have long since sought their nests;
The air is still; and dark, and deep
On the hill side the old wood rests.

Yet of the dark I have no fear,
But feel as safe as when 'tis light;
For I know God is with me there,
And He will guard me through the night.

For God is by me when I pray,
And when I close mine eyes to sleep,
I know that He will with me stay,
And will all night watch by me keep.

For He who rules the stars and sea,
Who makes the grass and trees to grow.
Will look on a poor child like me,
When on my knees I to Him bow.

He holds all things in His right hand,
The rich, the poor, the great, the small;
When we sleep, or sit, or stand,
He is with us, for He loves us all.
