= Ketton stone =

Ketton stone is a Jurassic oolitic limestone, cream to pale yellow or pink in colour, used as a building stone since the 16th century. It is named after the village of Ketton in Rutland, England. It was used as freestone, mostly in buildings outside Rutland, particularly in Cambridge, where it was used in many of the colleges.

Nowadays, the major quarry at Ketton produces limestone for the adjoining Ketton Cement Works but selected stone is still set aside for cut building blocks.

== Notable buildings ==
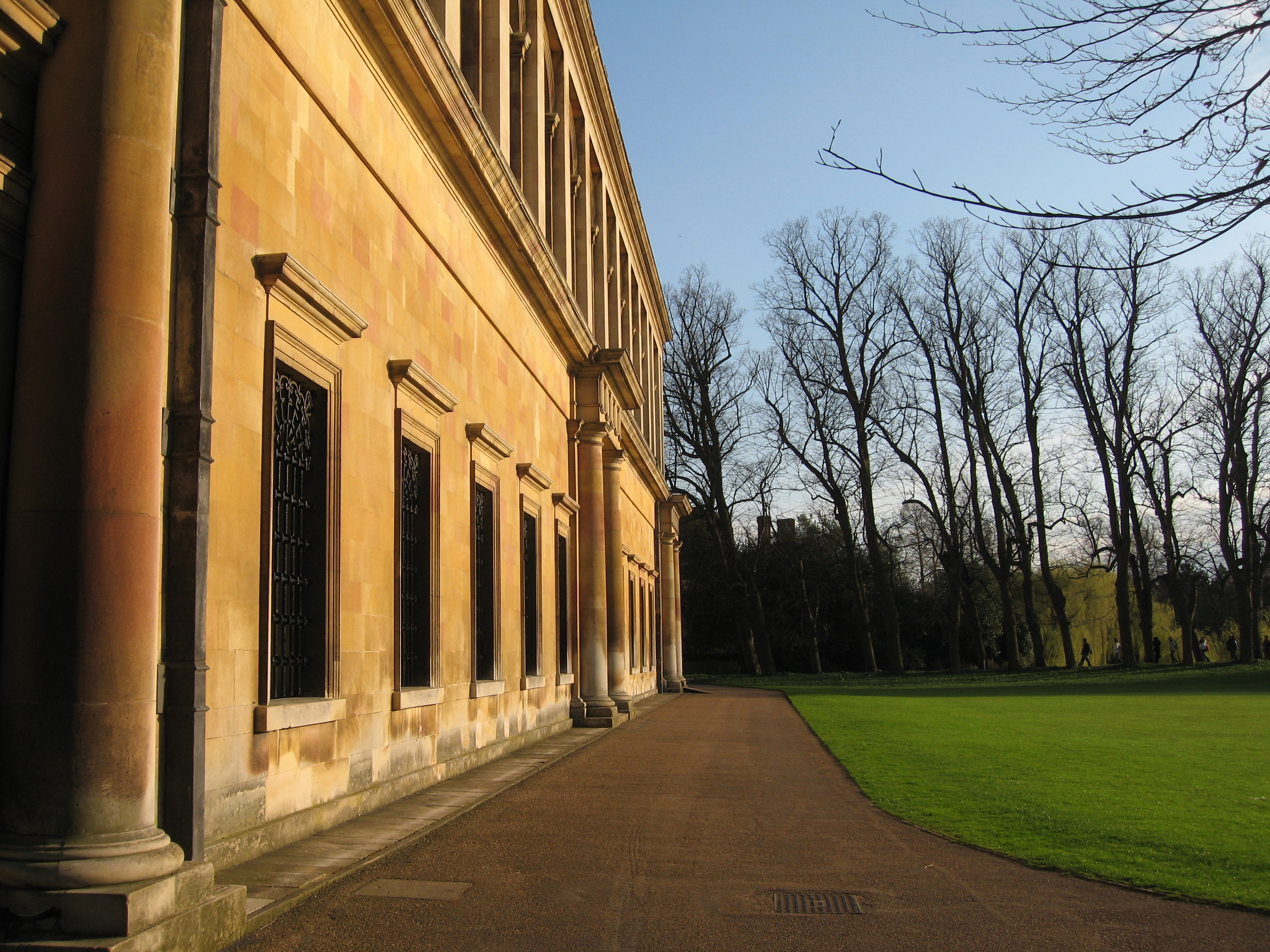
The Wren Library, Trinity College, Cambridge, built with Ketton Stone

- Wren Library, Cambridge
- Pembroke College Chapel
- Emmanuel College Chapel
- Burghley House
- Haymarket Memorial Clock Tower

== See also ==
- List of types of limestone
