= Ketton =

Village in Rutland, England

Coordinates: 52.631°N 0.552°W

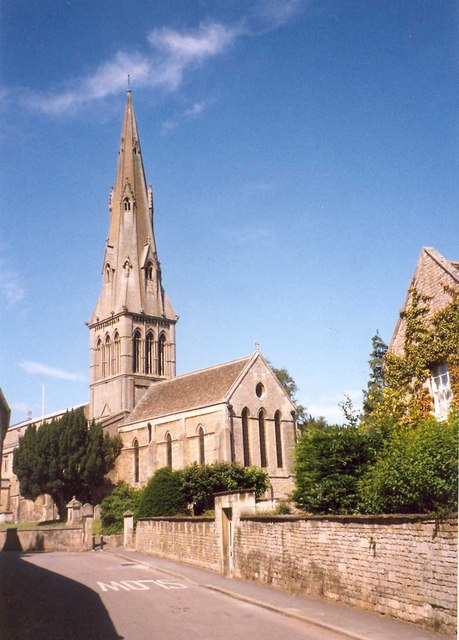
- Church of St Mary the Virgin, Ketton

- Location within Rutland
- Area: 5.22 sq mi (13.5 km^{2})
- Population: 1,926 2011 Census
  - Density: 369/sq mi (142/km^{2})
- OS grid reference: SK981047
  - London: 80 miles (130 km) SSE
- Civil parish: Ketton
- Unitary authority: Rutland
- Shire county: Rutland
- Ceremonial county: Rutland
- Region: East Midlands
- Country: England
- Sovereign state: United Kingdom
- Post town: Stamford
- Postcode district: PE9
- Dialling code: 01780
- Police: Leicestershire
- Fire: Leicestershire
- Ambulance: East Midlands
- UK Parliament: Rutland and Stamford
- Website: Ketton Parish Council

Ketton is a village and civil parish in Rutland in the East Midlands of England. It is about 8 miles (13 km) east of Oakham and 3 miles (5 km) west of Stamford, Lincolnshire. The 2011 Census recorded a parish population of 1,926, making it the fourth largest settlement in Rutland, after Oakham, Uppingham and Cottesmore. The village has a primary school.

Ketton gave its name to the Ketton Rural District of Rutland which existed from 1894 to 1974. Ketton ward, which includes the parishes of Barrowden, Tinwell and Tixover, is represented by two councillors on Rutland County Council.

== Etymology ==
The name of Ketton is first attested in the Domesday Book of 1086, as Chetene. The form Ketene first appears in 1174, and Keton in 1322. The origin of this name is uncertain, though scholars agree that the last element came during the history of the name's use to be thought of as the common place-name element deriving from Old English tūn ("estate"). Eilert Ekwall was confident that the vowel at the end of the early spellings represented the Old English word ēa ("river"), and that the name originated as an earlier name for the River Chater. One suggestion for the earlier part of the name is that it contains an otherwise unattested Old English personal name *Ceta in the genitive form *Cetan, in which case it once meant "Ceta's river". An alternative explanation for the first syllable is that it is the Common Brittonic word found in modern Welsh as coed ("woodland"). Ekwall thought that this might have been a regional name that gave rise to a noun *Cēte ("the people of Cet"); in its genitive form this could have produced *Cētena-ēa ("the river of the people of Cet"). A further suggestion on these lines is that the second syllable originated as the word found in Welsh as hen ("old"), in which case the name once meant "old wood", later giving its name to a river.

== Village ==
The village was originally three separate settlements: Ketton, Aldgate and Geeston; but they merged to form the village that Ketton is today.

The village has a post office and general store, a library, a branch GP surgery, one pub (the Railway Inn), a sports centre, a playschool and a Church of England primary school which in 2021/2022 had 185 pupils on its roll.

The village has two churches (Church of England and Methodist). The earliest parts of St Mary's Church, the Grade I listed Church of England parish church, are 12th century. The church has a central tower and spire. The west front is an example of late 12th-century transitional architecture and the remainder of the church is mainly 13th century. The nave was restored under the direction of George Gilbert Scott in 1861–62 and the chancel under the direction of his pupil Thomas Graham Jackson in 1863–66. Jackson's chancel roof was painted by Ninian Comper in 1950. The stone is from Barnack. There are Ketton headstones in the churchyard; one by the lychgate depicts mason's tools and is by stonemason William Hibbins of Ketton who built Hibbins House, which is still standing. The spire is 144 feet (44 metres) high. The Methodist chapel was refurbished in 2013 but dates back some 150 years.

Robert of Ketton was the first person to translate the Qur'an into Latin. The translation was complete by 1143.

Ketton is also home to a natural burial ground towards the Western side of the village.

== Ketton stone and cement ==
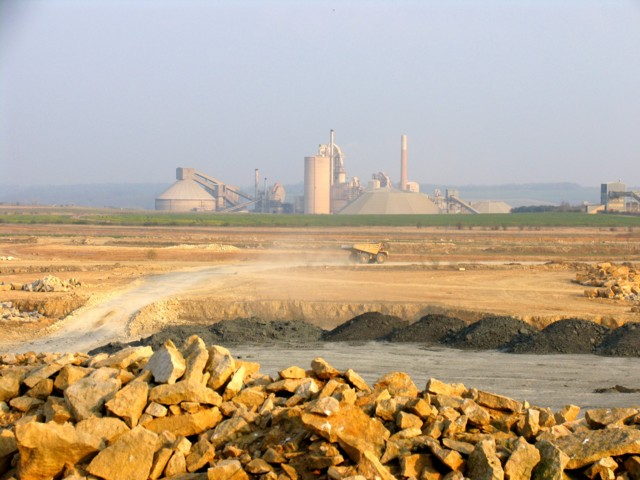
Ketton Quarry

The village gives its name to Ketton stone, a limestone which is quarried locally and is used in many buildings in the village and elsewhere. Some areas of former quarrying, Ketton Quarries, are a Site of Special Scientific Interest, maintained by Leicestershire and Rutland Wildlife Trust.

The limestone is used to make cement. Ketton Cement Works opened in 1928 and by November that year the number of staff had risen to 250. The plant, owned by Hanson Cement (now part of HeidelbergCement), meets more than 10% of the UK demand for cement.

== Renewable energy in Ketton ==
In 2013 Lark Energy built a solar power farm on land reclaimed from a 1940s quarry. The second phase was opened in 2015 by Secretary of State for Energy Amber Rudd. The solar farm provides 13% of the cement works' annual energy consumption.

In 2004 Rutland County Council planning committee resolved to approve a planning application for one wind turbine on land adjacent to the cement works off Steadfold Lane in Ketton. However, issues surrounding fast jets flying from RAF Cottesmore meant that a planning permission was never granted.

A proposal from REG Windpower to install two wind turbines near Steadfold Lane was withdrawn in August 2012.

== Transport ==
Ketton is served by buses on the service between Stamford and Uppingham. Ketton and Collyweston railway station closed in 1966.
