= Frederik Muller =

Dutch bibliographer, book seller, and print collector

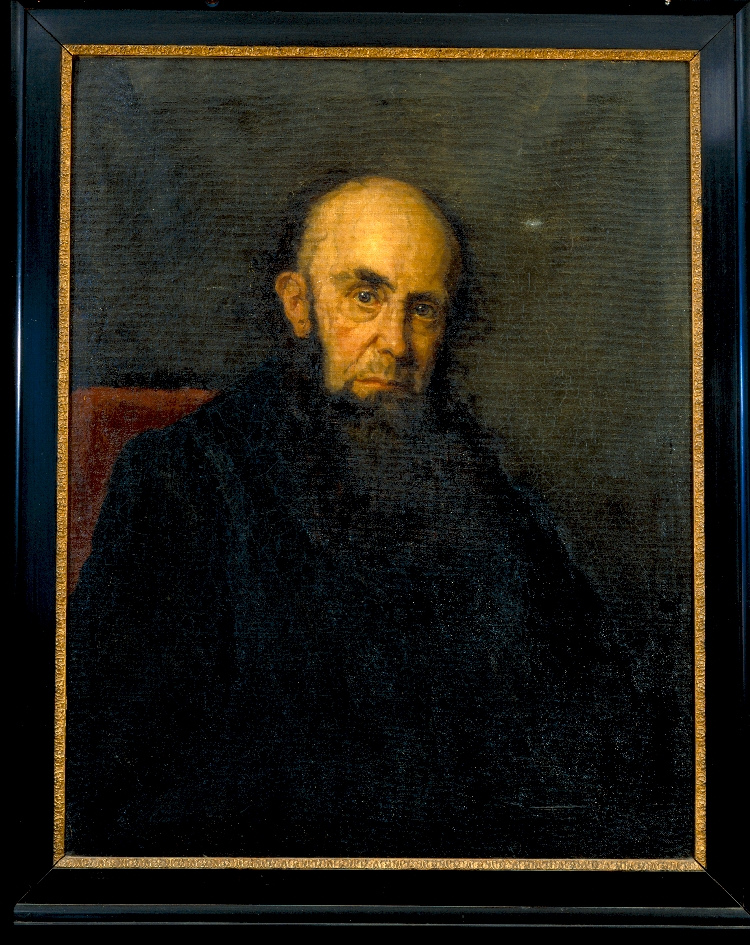
- Born: 22 July 1817; Amsterdam
- Died: 4 January 1881 (aged 63); Amsterdam

Frederik Muller or Frits Muller (22 July 1817 – 4 January 1881) was a Dutch bibliographer, book seller, and print collector. He married Gerarda Jacoba Yntema. Their son Samuel Muller Fz. became known as municipal and state archivist in Utrecht. Another son, Jacob Wijbrand Muller, was to become professor of Dutch language and literature at the University of Utrecht, and his son, Frederik Muller Jzn, would be professor of Latin at the University of Amsterdam and that of Leiden.

== Life and career ==
Muller was born in Amsterdam as the son of the Amsterdam professor Samuel Muller and attended the university Athenaeum Illustre. He grew up in an environment with a love for books and science, especially history. His capacity for hard work was inherited from his father. It was a trait he could also appreciate very well in others, while he loathed those who idled or were not very serious. He went to work for his uncle Johannes Muller on the Rokin in Amsterdam, who kept a bibliopolium there. After being apprenticed for 6 years to his uncle, an old-fashioned book-auctioneer, he started his own second-hand bookshop in 1843. He was primarily a bookseller (cartography formed only a comparatively small part of his total activities), a collector endowed with critical and scientific discrimination, and a scientific publisher. His passion for collecting revealed itself by his working procedure with which he tried to assemble as many works as possible in a given sphere before bringing them onto the market via a catalogue. Contrary to former practices he thought professional catalogues good for trade with side-benefits for science as well. He modelled his store catalogues in such a way that they were able to act at the same time as bibliographies. When we want to learn the depth of his drive in this matter we can do so in his own words. In 1878 he made an appeal for a Dutch bibliography in which he stated his passion. "For more than 40 years it has been my wish and aspiration to prepare such a book and once even to write it myself; in view of this I have laboured, collected, yes, lived; - but now having come at an advanced age, I must admit to my regret, that not only the powers, but principally also the knowledge to accomplish such a labour are wanting." After that he called on others to aid him in his task. When describing his Dutch bibliography he did not want to establish a national bibliography like the 'Brinkman' but he wanted to create an integrated list of 9 annotated bibliographies concerning mathematics, medicine, geography, theology & philosophy, ecclesiastical history & law, law & political sciences, Dutch & foreign history, literature, and arts. However all sciences had to be concerned with the Netherlands in a wider sense. When describing the way of description he suggests that "in this work one must consult more the demands of literature than those of a perfect bibliography. In this way e.g. a discreet abbreviation of the titles will be desirable, yes, even necessary, while the addition of the publishers and amount of pages may be counted superfluous (in general). ... On the other hand it would be appreciated very much, if the amount of maps, engravings and portraits, sometimes also the engravers of these representations were mentioned, and these statements are considered much more important than the mentioning of printer and amount of pages.". This may not be in accordance with modern bibliographic practises, but was an enormous improvement compared with the past.

From 1850 onwards Muller collected many Dutch historical prints and maps. These were bought at many auctions, starting with the 1850 auction of the historical atlas of E. de Burlett. As Muller stated in his bibliography of these prints he first had the intention of publishing a catalogue containing topographical works concerning the Netherlands and its provinces, and pictorial maps of towns and villages, but he abandoned the project because he thought himself not knowledgeable enough in this field. But the catalogue contains many historical maps, mostly to do with sieges, battles and defence works. Not only did he describe his own prints, but also those of other famous collectors like Abraham van Stolk, resulting in the description of 8,443 items. The fourth part is a supplement to the first three. He tried to put all editions of a certain item under the same number so comparison can be easily made. The collection known as the 'Muller Historical Print Collection' was purchased in 1881 by the Dutch government and is now preserved in the State Print Cabinet in Amsterdam.

For many years Muller had collected pamphlets concerning Dutch history. Though there were not many buyers for these publications at the time he understood their historical value. From 1853 onwards, together with P.A. Tiele, he systematized them, ordered them chronologically, and described them according to the system developed by Tiele, resulting in a three-volume catalogue, published between 1858-1861 and describing ca. 10,000 items published between 1500 and 1702. The collection (ca. 19.000 items) was bought by I.S. Meulman and after his death sold to the Gent University Library in Belgium and since then is supplemented by the Vander Haeghen collection of more than 3,000 items.

During his lifetime Muller published 13 antiquarian bookselling and store catalogues relating to geography, voyages and cartography. Up till 1912 his firm published all in all 32 bibliographies/catalogues dedicated to the same subject. Baron von Korff, librarian of the Imperial Library of St. Petersburg, was building the so-called 'Biblioteca Rossica', in which he wanted to include everything printed on the subject of Russia. After 1850 he called on Muller to supply him with every item he could lay his hands on. Of course Muller was very willing to serve such an uncritical customer. However he was not only a bookseller as he was going to state in the preface of his America catalogue of 1872: "... Since I began my present business, now more than thirty years ago my firm conviction was, and it has ever remained such - that the antiquarian bookseller can largely serve science - bibliography or literary history especially - without forgetting his own profit; providing his mind be not wholly engrossed by money-making speculations". This noble thought was embodied in his 'Bibliographie Neerlando-Russe' specialized in maps and atlases and according to Prof. Koeman the first Dutch bibliographic study devoted to atlas cartography. Numbers 971-1044 are mainly Dutch atlases, half of them maritime atlases; no. 1045-1049 are town books; no. 1050-1243 are very succinct map-titles, mainly Dutch, some French and German. It also contains a 'table systematique'. In his preface Muller acknowledged the fact that he was able to draw on the collection of Bodel Nijenhuis. The firm Fred. Muller & Co. had more customers like Baron Von Korff as exemplified by Eino Nivanka's account. Had they first been the main purveyors to Nordenskiöld, in 1921 the firm sold the Nordenskiöld collection 'en bloc' to the city of Helsinki, altogether a very profitable way of doing business.

One of Muller's greatest achievements was the three-volume Americana catalogue, published between 1872 and 1875, with two precursors in 1850 and 1855 and one follow-up in 1877. Many of the publications mentioned in this catalogue had come to him with the original maps cut out. He completed some original editions with facsimiles which, in his own words, "are so admirably executed ... that they will, being printed on old paper, defy the scrutiny of the most skilful investigator". Though one might object against this 'falsifying' practise it may have prevented certain important maps of becoming obscure or lost.

In 1876 he took on Frederik Adama van Scheltema as his partner and they moved to the Nieuwe Doelenstraat 16-18 where they opened the auction house Frederik Muller & Co. They specialized in books and prints, but after Muller died, Scheltema began to deal in oil paintings as well, which gained them international recognition as art connoisseurs. Their name appears often in art provenance records.

To honour his pioneering work his name was given in 1964 to the first library- and documentation school in The Netherlands in Amsterdam, the Frederik Muller Academie, which later became part of the Hogeschool van Amsterdam (HvA).

Muller died in Amsterdam.

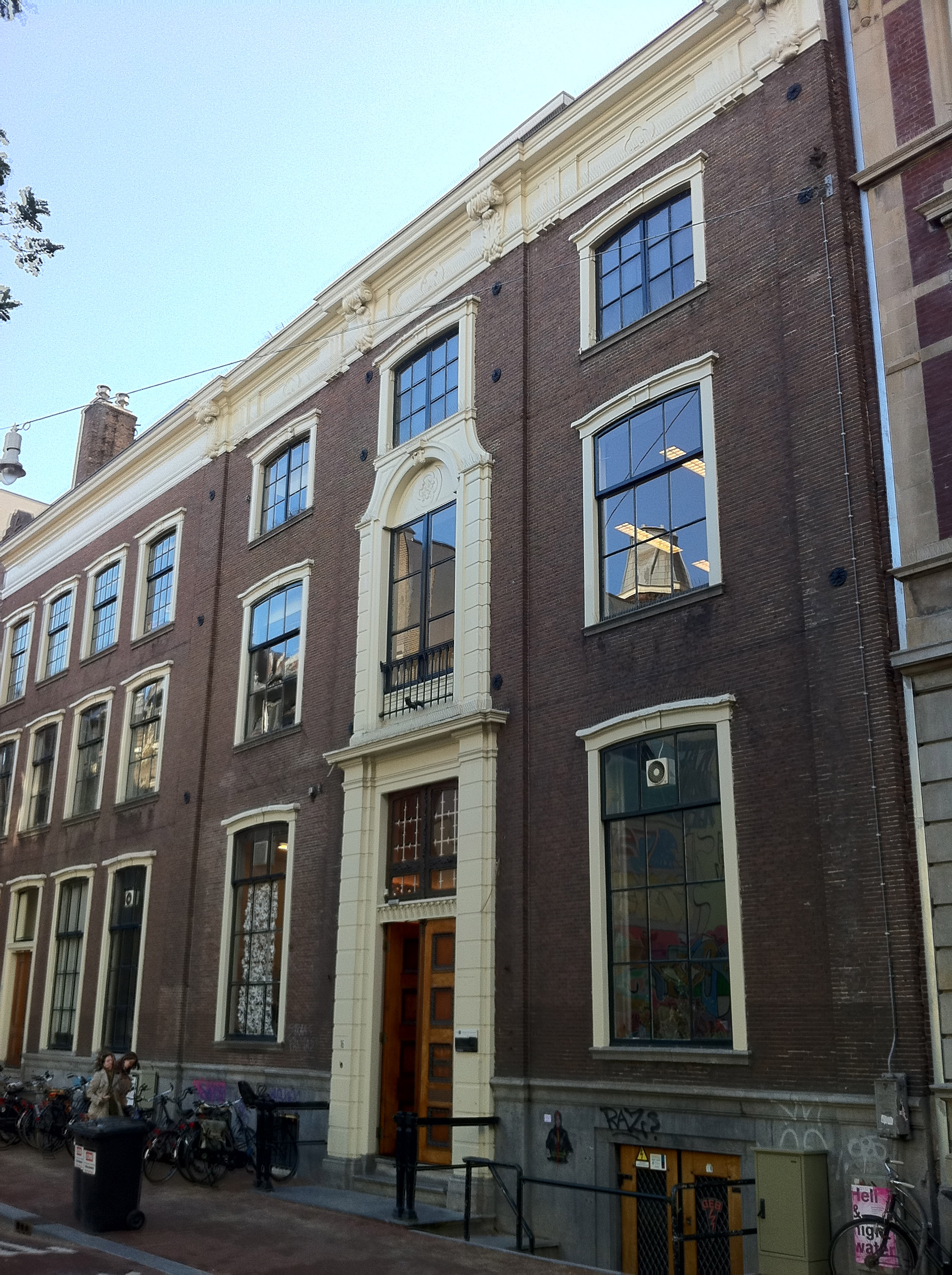
Former auction house in Nieuwe Doelenstraat

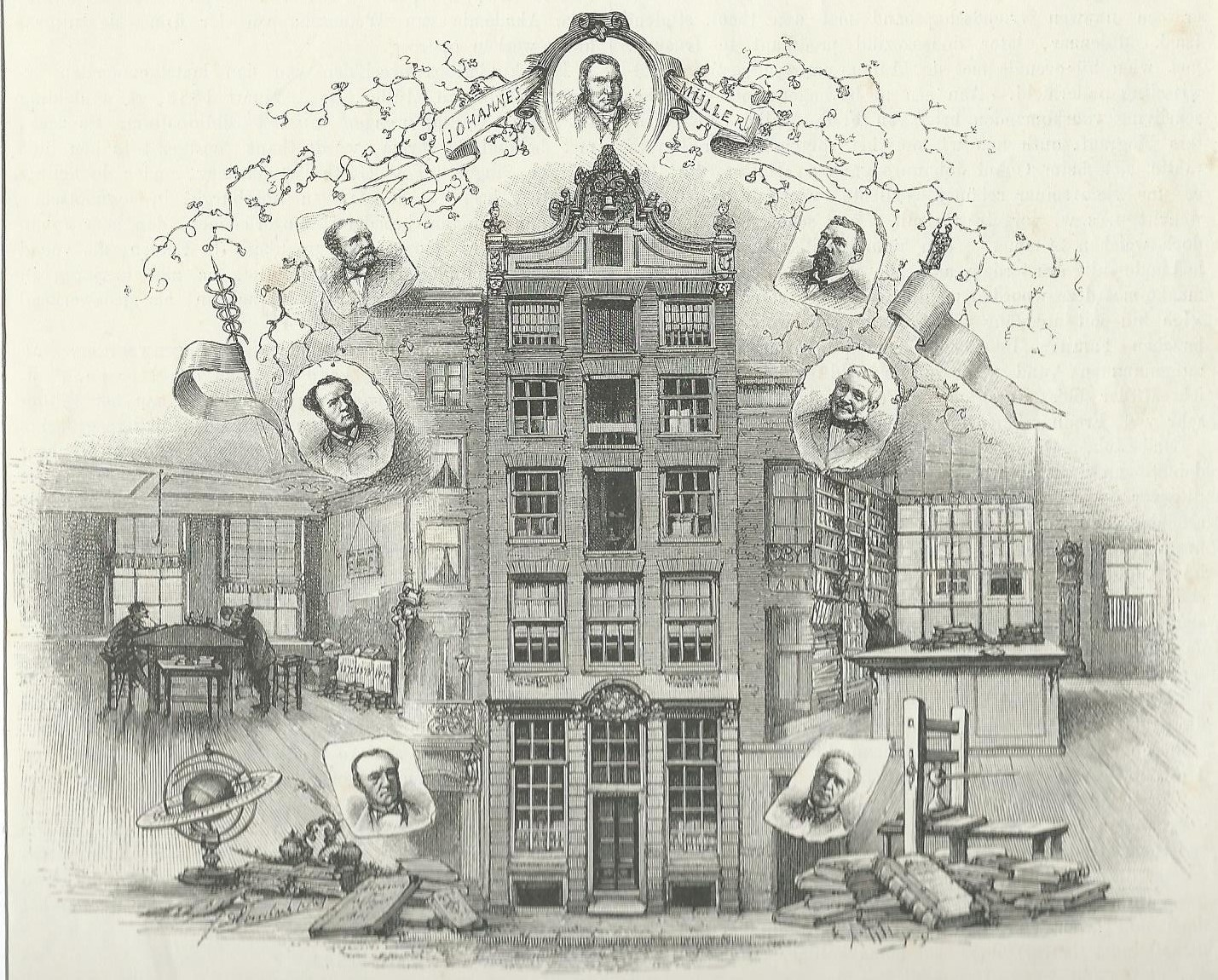
Johannes Muller's bibliopolium with cameo portraits of the men who worked there

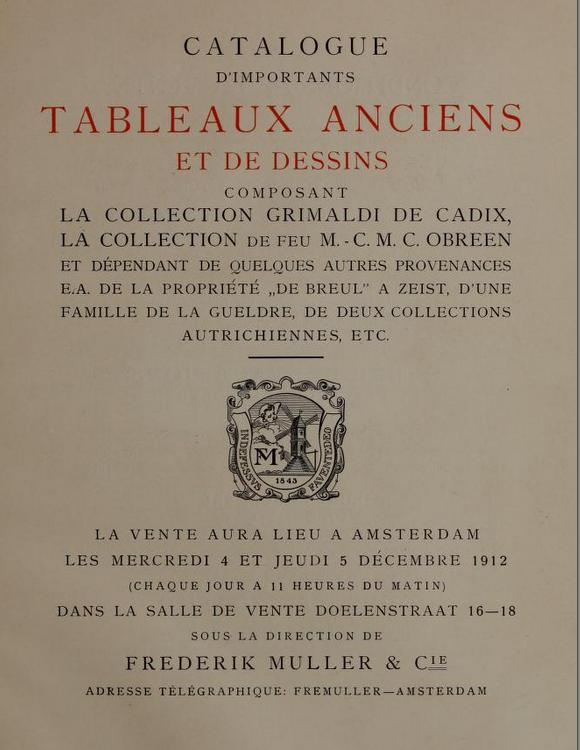
Auction sale catalog for Frederik Muller & Cie in 1912
