= Ketton Cement Works =

Coordinates: 52.640°N 0.547°W

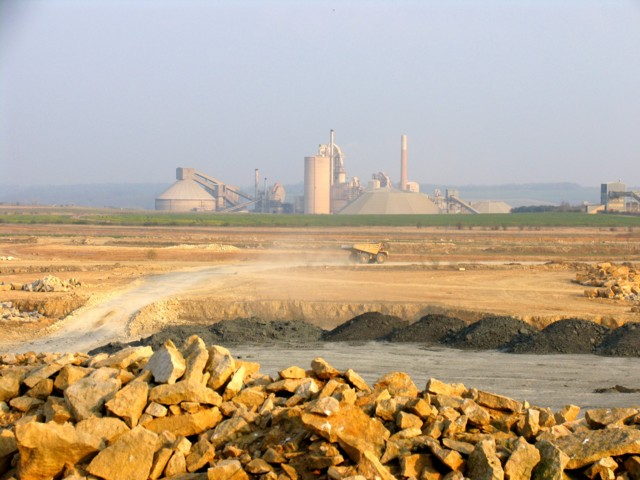
Ketton quarry & plant

Ketton Cement Works is a large cement plant and quarry based in the village of Ketton in the county of Rutland in the United Kingdom. Now owned by HeidelbergCement, the plant produces around one tenth of the UK's Portland Cement needs. Ketton works employs around 220 people.

== History ==
Ketton stone, a Jurassic oolitic limestone, has been used as a building stone since the 16th century. Some areas of former quarrying, Ketton Quarries, are now a Site of Special Scientific Interest, maintained by Leicestershire and Rutland Wildlife Trust.

Ketton Cement works can trace its history back to Frank Walker, a Sheffield builder, who was looking to establish a works for sectional buildings and cement products. In 1921, he bought 1174 acres of Ketton parish, most of which consisted of old quarries and clay pits. In 1925, Walker established a small concrete block factory company under the name "Walkers Ketton Stone Company", and by 1927 was looking to raise the capital for a cement works. The project was taken up by Sheffield businessman Joseph Ward, the brother of Thomas William Ward and chairman of the business which also had interests in machinery, scrap metal, fuel and ship breaking. For most of its history, Ketton Cement was treated as a subsidiary of Thos. W. Ward. Frank Walker sold his block business to the newly formed The Ketton Portland Cement Company in July 1928, followed by his land at Ketton in August. Work began on the cement works on 1 August 1928, with much of the machinery and railway equipment coming from Ward's. The first full weekly wage-bill of £202.2.11 was paid on the week ending 10 August 1928 for about 90 men. By the week ending 8 November, the wage bill had risen to over £600 for around 250 men and boys, who worked on the site.

== Early days ==
The works was built with just one kiln but in 1933 Kiln Two was added. Kiln Three soon followed in 1939. A major part of the construction of Kiln Three was its new chimney built out of reinforced concrete, as opposed to brick. The chimney stood at an impressive 338 feet (103 m) high and was the tallest structure in the south of England, visible for as far as 50 miles away. The rapid growth of the plant was in line with a rise of cement prices towards the end of the late 1930s. By 1939, production had increased from 50,000 tonnes in 1930 to well over 200,000 tonnes. During the Second World War, the demand for cement increased hugely due to the construction of military bases and defences, but, as with most industry at the time, Ketton Cement suffered from labour shortages due to the call up of most able-bodied men.

Kiln Four was built in 1954, increasing the plant output to around 300,000 tonnes by the late 1950s. Further growth continued into the 1960s as the mass slum clearances lead to mass redevelopment in towns and cities. By the late 1960s, the plant had grown by an extra two kilns and production stood at over 600,000 tonnes. Development by the Ketton lab saw a rapid-hardening cement (branded "Kettocrete") and a waterproof cement product being made, thanks to the further understanding of what differing proportions and quantities of minerals in the clinker could achieve. Water repellent and masonry cement were also developed by the laboratory, with differing quantities often controlled manually with little control by technology.

== Modern day ==
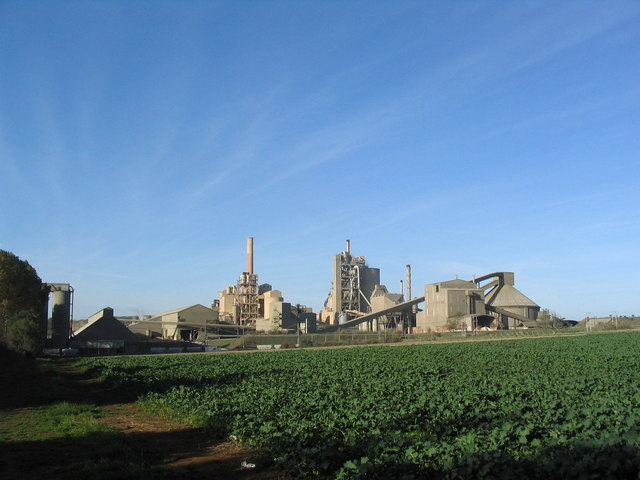
Ketton cement works

As production increased, the transport of limestone and silica clay from the quarry to the plant needed to become more efficient. The standard gauge railway that had operated since the opening of the factory was replaced initially by dump-trucks, before being superseded by conveyor belts. New, larger crushers were installed in the quarry to reduce the size of the limestone before mixing with the clay. Kiln 7 was completed in 1975 at a cost of £10m. This kiln produced clinker by the dry process, as opposed to Kilns 1 – 6 which heated the crushed lime and clay as a slurry mixture. Dry-process kilns were more efficient as there was no water to evaporate first. Kiln 7 also featured a preheater which heated the raw meal using the kiln exhaust gases to around 800 Degrees before entering the main kiln. By the late 1970s, Ketton was producing around 700,000 tonnes of cement per annum from all seven kilns.

In the early 1980s, Thos. W. Ward became part of worldwide group Rio Tinto Zinc, and Ketton Cement was rebranded as Castle Cement. With an increasing market share, Kiln 8 was designed and built in the mid-1980s. At a cost of £70m, the kiln is 68m long and the preheater tower is around 80m high. Two large stores with capacity of 43,000 and 10,000 tonnes each were constructed to enable storage of raw materials to feed the kilns. This enabled working hours in the quarry to be reduced to a five-day week. Once Kiln 8 was operational and initial faults were rectified, Kilns 1 – 4 were closed in 1986, followed by Kilns 5 & 6 in 1987. These have been demolished and the area where they stood grassed over. The workforce at Ketton was reduced from around 520 to 310 mostly through compulsory redundancies. In 1989, Castle Cement passed into the ownership of Scancem, which was a cement and building materials manufacturer operating across Europe and Africa.

== The Hanson era ==
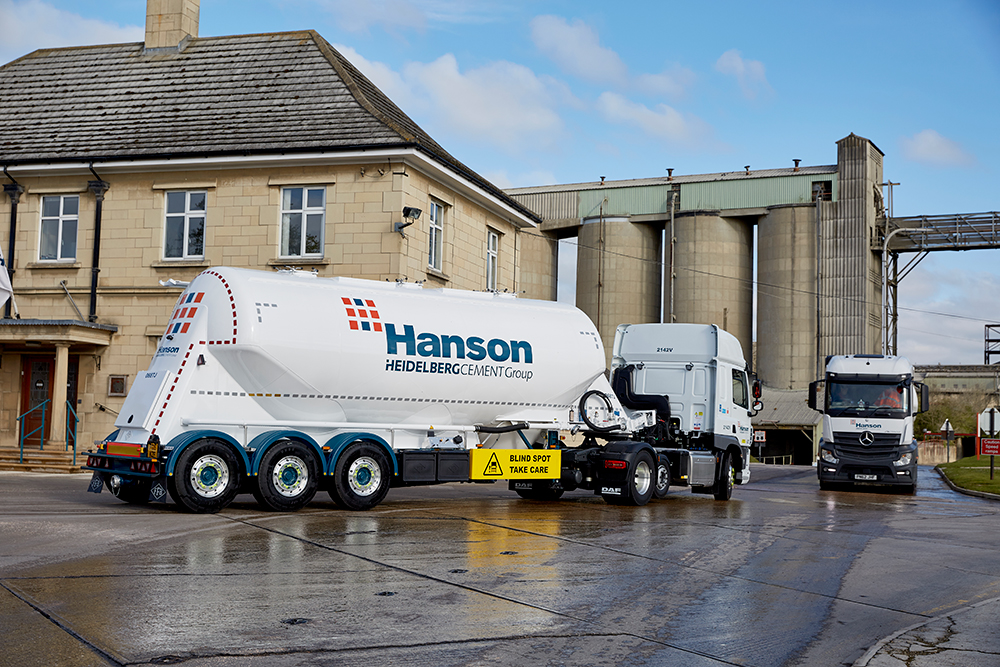
Hanson Cement invested in the delivery fleet at Ketton including Euro 6 tractor units and bulk tankers

Scancem was bought by Heidelberg Cement in 1999 and the Castle Cement logo was adjusted to incorporate the name of its new parent company. In 2007, Hanson Plc (formally ARC) was bought by Heidelberg and two years later Castle Cement was merged with Civil & Marine to form Hanson Cement. The distinctive Castle logo was replaced by the Hanson "H" logo though the Castle "Turret" was retained on packaging due to the strength of customer loyalty. The economic downturn hit Ketton hard, and with a reduction in the output of cement, Kiln 7 was mothballed in September 2008 with no prospect of restarting in the near future. Following a shake-up and cost-cutting exercise in 2012, many office functions including planning and distribution for the prepacked aggregates business were moved to Ketton. This includes logistics for bagging plants such as Needingworth and Nuneaton.

== Transport ==
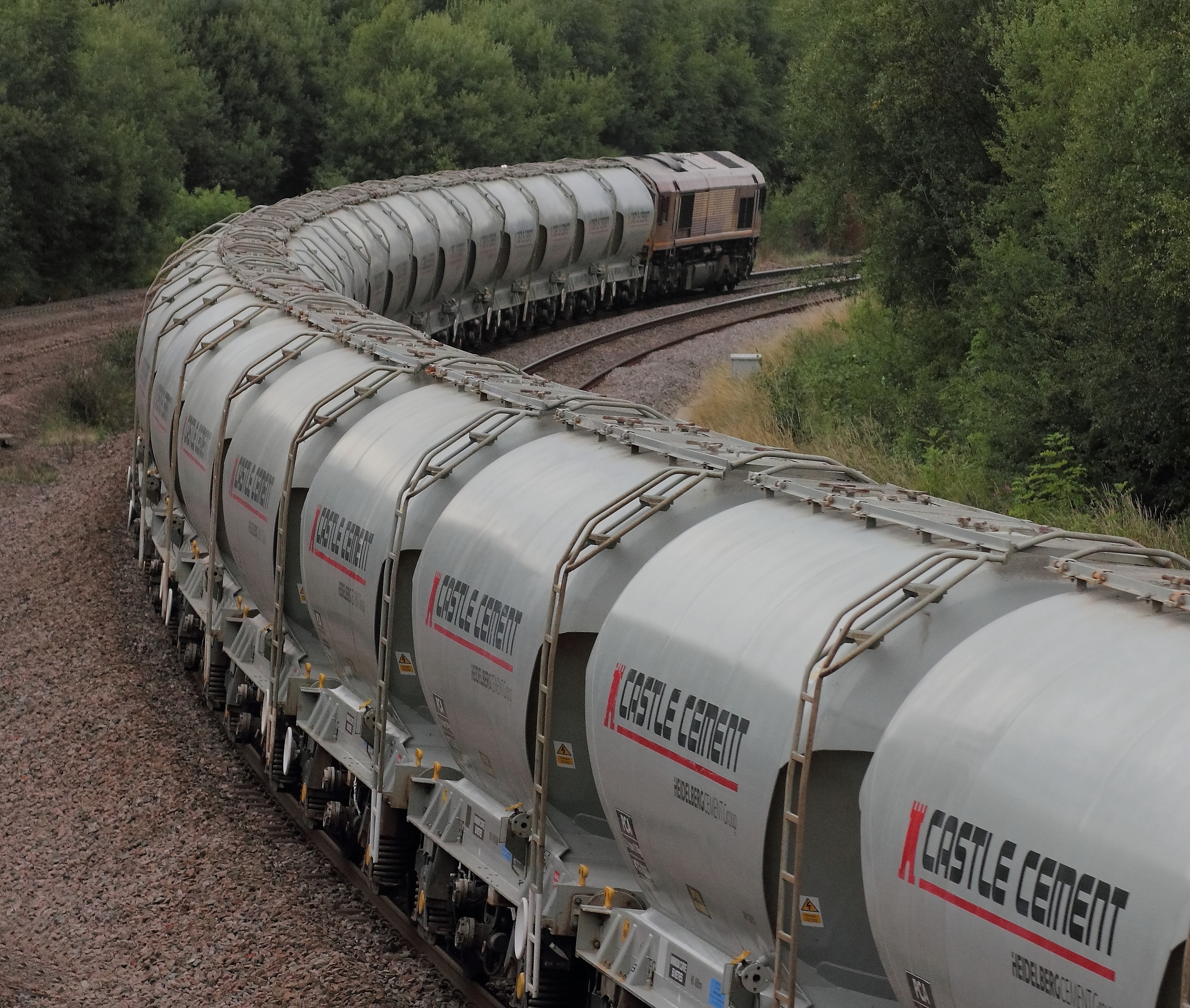
Castle Cement bulk cement by rail

One of the initial factors in the location of the plant, other than the high quality of lime and silica clays present onsite, was the proximity of the LMS Birmingham to Peterborough Line to the south of the factory. Exchange sidings (known even today as Ward's Sidings) were built to receive and dispatch train loads of cement while receiving fuel into the plant. Shunting duties were handled initially by steam locomotives procured from Thos. W. Ward. These were replaced in 1961 by five Fowler diesel locos, also from Ward's. Following plant efficiencies, Diesels 2 & 3 were returned to Fowler in 1967 and No. 5 was withdrawn in 1971. "Ketton No. 1", Fowler 0-4-0DH No. 4220007, built in 1960, is on display at Rutland Railway Museum.

Now shunting is handled by British Rail Class 08 shunters on hire from DB Schenker, who also provide traction for outbound cement and inbound coal trains on the main line. Following rationalisation of receiving terminals during the 1970s and 1980s, cement from Ketton is now sent four or five days a week to a large terminal at Kings Cross Central in North London. Rail-borne cement is handled in four-wheel tankers and cement is discharged pneumatically.

Cement has always been transported by road, however with the growth of ready-mixed concrete plants from the 1960s onwards, and the rationalising of the railway network, road haulage has grown in importance, with both Ketton's own fleet of trucks as well as external hauliers used to transport finished cement products both in bulk tankers and palletised in curtainside vehicles.

== Environment ==
When Kiln 5 was built in 1962, electrostatic dust arrestment equipment was fitted to reduce the dust pollution that was so common with earlier cement works. In the 1990s, Castle Cement embarked on a programme reducing the amount of coal burnt by Ketton works. Profuel, a recycled fuel product consisting of shredded paper and plastics that would otherwise go to landfill was introduced in the mid-1990s. In 1996, used car tyres were introduced as an alternative fuel. The introduction of burning waste as a fuel initially created concern within local communities as worries about health and environmental risks created news headlines. Much was done by Castle Cement and the staff at Ketton to communicate with its neighbours and to be open about its activities at the plant including local meetings, visits and newsletters. Hanson Cement held an open day at the Ketton production facility every year in July.

In 2013 Lark Energy built a solar power farm on land reclaimed from a 1940s quarry. The second phase was opened in 2015 by Secretary of State for Energy Amber Rudd. The solar farm provides 13% of the cement works' annual energy consumption.
