= Froxfield, Bedfordshire =

Hamlet in Bedfordshire, England

Coordinates: 51°59′24″N 0°34′48″W

Froxfield
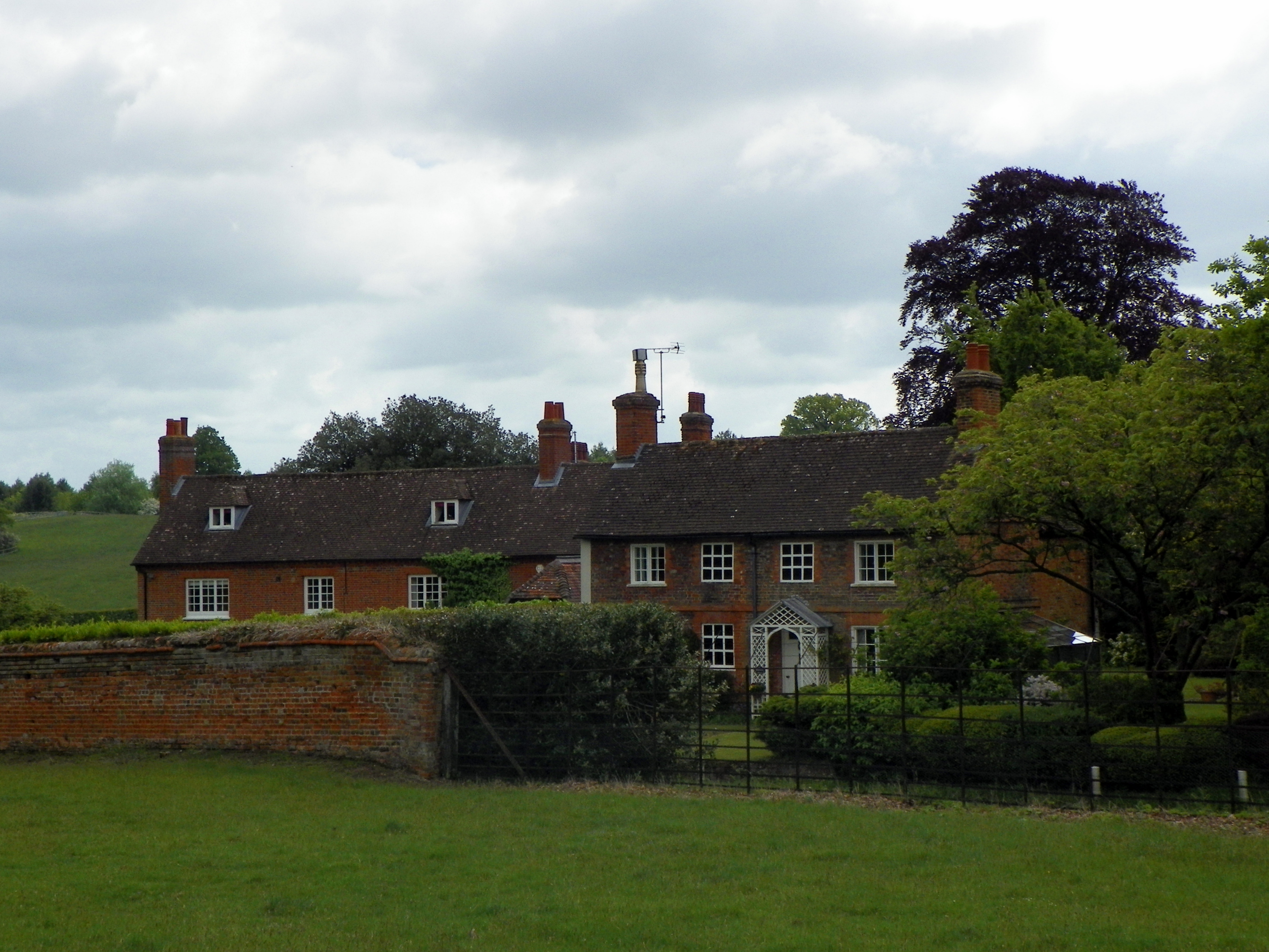
- Froxfield House
- OS grid reference: SP973334
- Civil parish: Eversholt
- Unitary authority: Central Bedfordshire
- Ceremonial county: Bedfordshire
- Region: East
- Country: England
- Sovereign state: United Kingdom
- Postcode district: MK17
- Police: Bedfordshire
- Fire: Bedfordshire
- Ambulance: East of England
- UK Parliament: Mid Bedfordshire

Froxfield is a small hamlet in Bedfordshire, England. It is situated at the eastern edge of Woburn Deer Park and northwest of Eversholt.

Froxfield House is a Grade II-listed 18th century red brick building. In 1836, it became the residence of John Martin when he was appointed librarian to the Duke of Bedford at Woburn Abbey.
