= John Martin (bibliographer) =

English bibliographer (1791–1855)

John Martin (1791–1855) was an English bookseller, librarian and writer, known as a bibliographer.

== Life ==
Born on 16 September 1791, he was son of John Martin of 112 Mount Street, Grosvenor Square, London. After assisting John Hatchard, bookseller in Piccadilly, he went into business on his own account in Holles Street, Cavendish Square; but soon afterwards entered into partnership with John Rodwell in New Bond Street. He retired from business in 1826, but continued bibliographical pursuits.

Until 1845 Martin acted as secretary to the Artists' Benevolent Fund. In 1836 he was appointed librarian to the Duke of Bedford at Woburn Abbey, and settled at Froxfield, in the parish of Eversholt, nearby. He visited nearly every church in Bedfordshire, and wrote a description of each in a series of articles which appeared in the Bedford Times and Northampton Mercury.

Martin died on 30 December 1855 at Froxfield, and was buried in Eversholt churchyard. He was a Fellow of both the Society of Antiquaries of London and the Linnean Society.

== Works ==
In 1834 Martin published the results of research, his Bibliographical Catalogue of Books privately printed, 2nd edit., 1854. The first edition contained an account of private presses and book clubs omitted in the second edition. He wrote also a History and Description of Woburn and its Abbey; a new edition, Woburn, 1845. The first edition was in 1831, by John Docwra Parry.

At the request of Lord John Russell, Martin compiled an ‘Enquiry into the authority for a statement in Echard's History of England regarding William, lord Russell,’ which was printed for private circulation in 1852, and published in 1856. It related to the fabricated Popish Plot, and the assertion that the early Whig William Russell, Lord Russell interfered to prevent the mitigation of the punishment of being hanged, drawn and quartered for high treason, in the case of Viscount Stafford, on the presentation of the petition of Sheriffs Slingsby Bethel and Henry Cornish to the House of Commons on 23 December 1680. Martin also furnished notes to Lord John Russell's edition of Rachel Russell, Lady Russell's Letters, 1853; and in 1855 he published a translation of François Guizot's essay on the Married Life of Rachel, Lady Russell.

Martin edited Thomas Gray's Bard (1837), and Gray's Elegy in a Country Churchyard (1839 and 1854), with illustrations from drawings by the Hon. Mrs. John Talbot, and the Seven Ages of Shakspeare (1840 and 1848), illustrated with wood engravings.

=== Church descriptions ===
Martin's newspaper articles on Bedfordshire churches, 1845–47 and 1852–54, are reprinted, along with near contemporary notes and descriptions by Archdeacon Henry Bonney and Sir Stephen Glynne, and relevant archival records, in the following volumes:

- Pickford, Chris, ed. (1994). Bedfordshire Churches in the Nineteenth Century: part 1: parishes A to G. Bedfordshire Historical Record Society. Vol. 73. Bedford: Bedfordshire Historical Record Society. ISBN 0851550568.
- Pickford, Chris, ed. (1998). Bedfordshire Churches in the Nineteenth Century: part 2: parishes Harlington to Roxton. Bedfordshire Historical Record Society. Vol. 77. Bedford: Bedfordshire Historical Record Society. ISBN 0851550606.
- Pickford, Chris, ed. (2000). Bedfordshire Churches in the Nineteenth Century: part 3: parishes Salford to Yelden. Bedfordshire Historical Record Society. Vol. 79. Bedford: Bedfordshire Historical Record Society. ISBN 0851550630.
- Pickford, Chris, ed. (2001). Bedfordshire Churches in the Nineteenth Century: part 4: appendices and index. Bedfordshire Historical Record Society. Vol. 80. Bedford: Bedfordshire Historical Record Society. ISBN 0851550649.

== Family ==
Martin's wife died in 1836, and of six children, three survived him. His eldest son, John Edward Martin, librarian to the Inner Temple, died on 20 July 1893, aged 71.

== Notes ==
Attribution

This article incorporates text from a publication now in the public domain: Lee, Sidney, ed. (1893). "Martin, John (1791-1855)". Dictionary of National Biography. Vol. 36. London: Smith, Elder & Co.
