= Riseholme (disambiguation) =

Riseholme is a village in Lincolnshire, England.

Riseholme may also refer to:

- Riseholme (fictional village), a fictional village in the "Mapp and Lucia" novels of E. F. Benson
- Riseholme College, Riseholme, Lincolnshire, England
