= John Kaye (bishop) =

British churchman and bishop (1783–1853)

The Right Reverend John Kaye
- Bishop of Lincoln
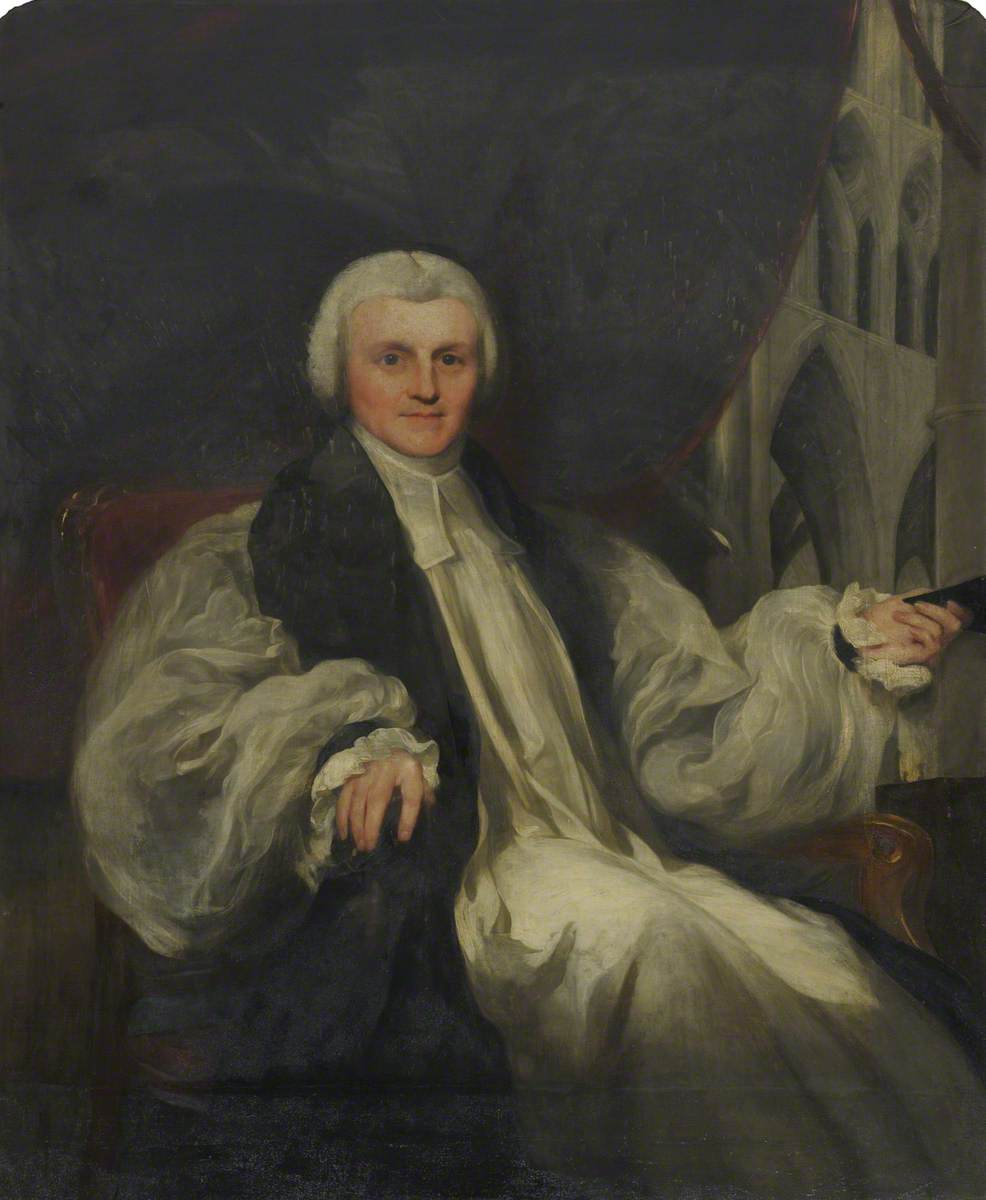
- Portrait of Bp. John Kaye by Richard Rothwell (c.1832)
- Diocese: Lincoln
- In office: 1827–1853
- Predecessor: George Pelham
- Successor: John Jackson
- Other post: Bishop of Bristol (1820–1827)

Personal details
- Born: 27 December 1783 Hammersmith, London
- Died: 18 February 1853 (aged 69)
- Buried: St Mary's, Riseholme, Lincs.
- Denomination: Anglican
- Residence: Riseholme Hall, Lincs.
- Children: William Kaye
- Education: Christ's College, Cambridge

John Kaye (27 December 1783, Hammersmith – 18 February 1853, Riseholme, Lincolnshire) was a British churchman.

== Early life and education ==
He was born the only son of Abraham Kaye in Hammersmith, London and educated at the school of Sir Charles Burney in Hammersmith and then Greenwich. He entered Christ's College, Cambridge and graduated Senior wrangler in 1804. He was the 21st Master of Christ's College from 1814 to 1830. Vice-Chancellor of Cambridge University in 1814,

In 1816, Kaye was elected Regius Professor of Divinity and he revived public lectures on theology, with an focus on the study of ecclesiastical history and the Early Church Fathers. His first series of lectures, The Ecclesiastical History of the Second and Third Centuries, illustrated from the Writings of Tertullian was published at Cambridge in 1825, and was followed by published lectures on Justin Martyr (1829), Clement of Alexandria (1835) and The Council of Nicæa in connection with the Life of Athanasius (posthumously, 1853).

He was elected Fellow of the Royal Society in 1848.

== Ecclesiastical career ==
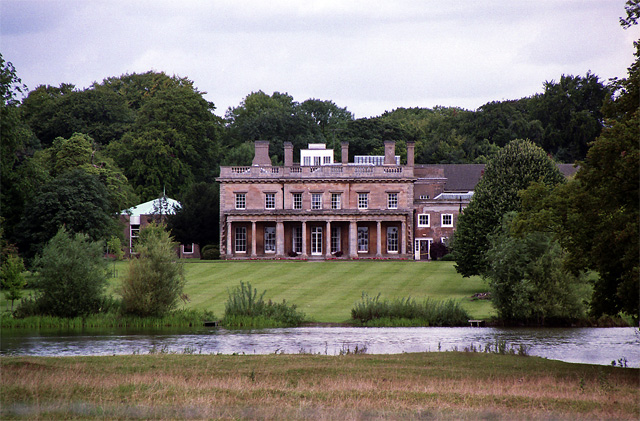
The episcopal palace at Riseholme Hall

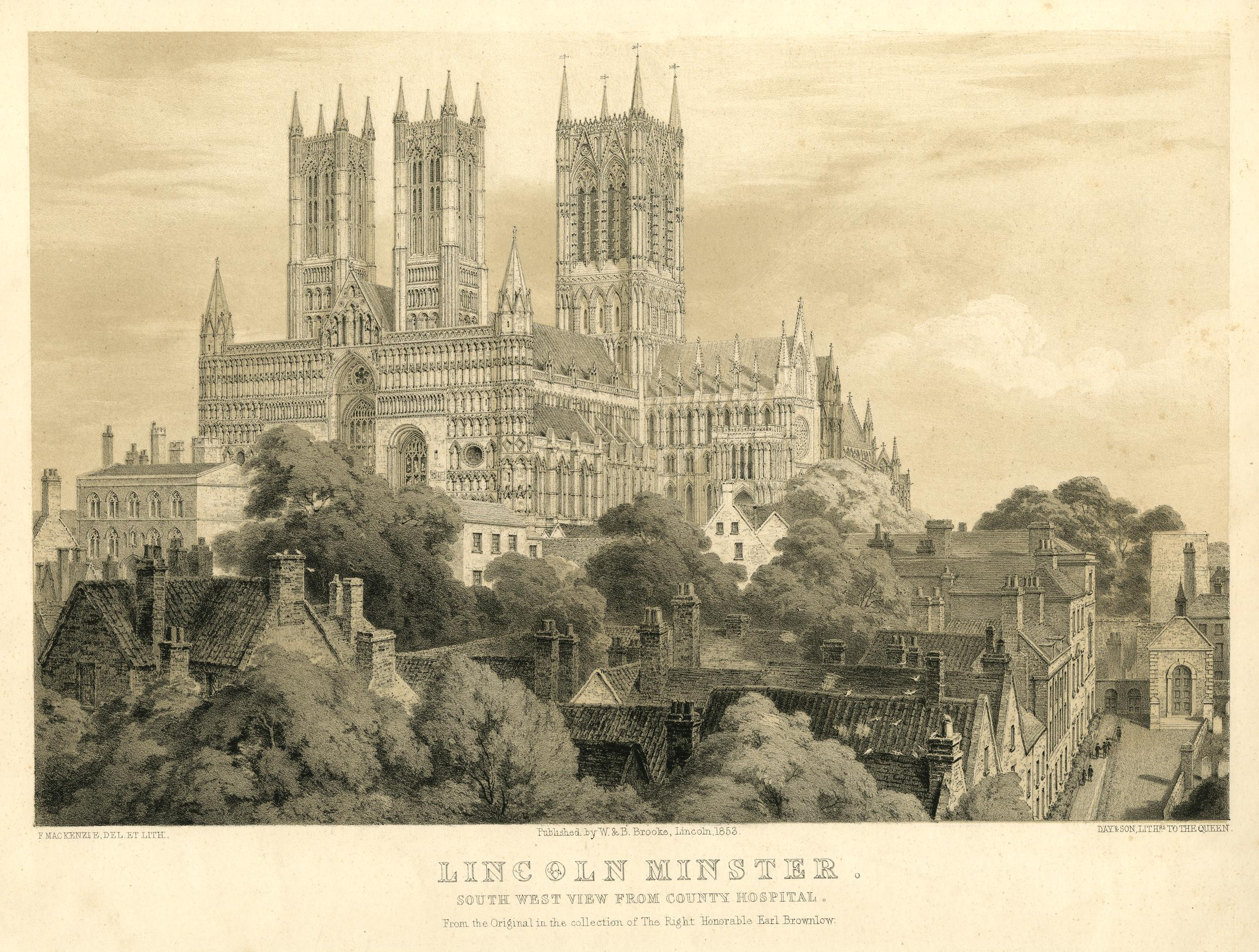
Lithograph of Lincoln Cathedral, made by Frederick Mackenzie in 1853, the year of Bp. John Kaye's death

Kaye was appointed Bishop of Bristol in 1820, and remained there until his translation in 1827 to Lincoln. Kaye served as Bishop of Lincoln for 26 years until his death in 1853. During his incumbency at Lincoln, he instigated widespread improvements to church buildings and parsonages and established new Church of England schools.

As Bishop of Lincoln, Kaye resided at Buckden Palace in Buckden Huntingdonshire. In 1837, the county was transferred to the Diocese of Ely and Kaye's official residence was transferred to Riseholme Hall, the newly established episcopal palace at Riseholme in Lincolnshire.

In 1848, Kaye was elected Visitor of Balliol College, Oxford.

At a time when the Oxford Movement sought to revive some older Catholic traditions within the Church of England, although associated with the Hackney Phalanx, Kaye's theological inclinations displayed a certain sympathy for Evangelicalism, and he regarded the Tractarian movement with suspicion. He was opposed to the revival of the Convocations of Canterbury and York and was sympathetic to George Cornelius Gorham's views on baptism.

He reformed the educational requirements for the Anglican clergy and attacked the Tractarians for betraying the English Reformation.

== Personal life ==
While at Christ's College, Cambridge, Kaye married Eliza Mortlock in 1815. They had three daughters and one son, William Frederic John Kaye, who was later ordained to the priesthood and was appointed Archdeacon of Lincoln in 1863 by his father's successor, Bishop John Jackson.

== Death and memorials ==
Bishop Kaye is buried in the churchyard of St Mary's Church in Riseholme, Lincolnshire, a church that he himself had built during his reforms of the See of Lincoln. Within Lincoln Cathedral, Kaye is commemorated by a recumbent effigy tomb monument designed by Richard Westmacott. The memorial originally stood in St Hugh's transept, but was moved to the southern chapel.

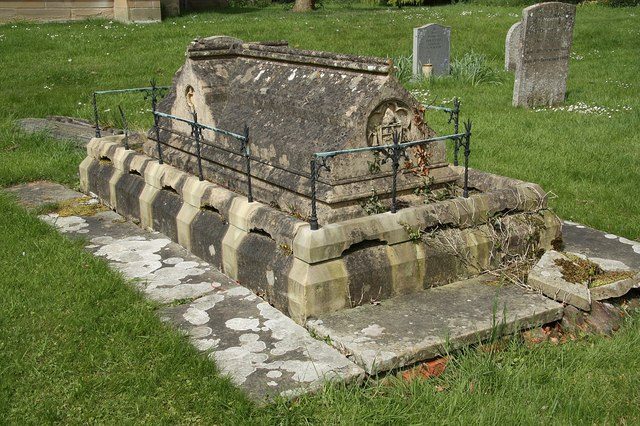
Bishop Kaye's grave at St Mary's Riseholme

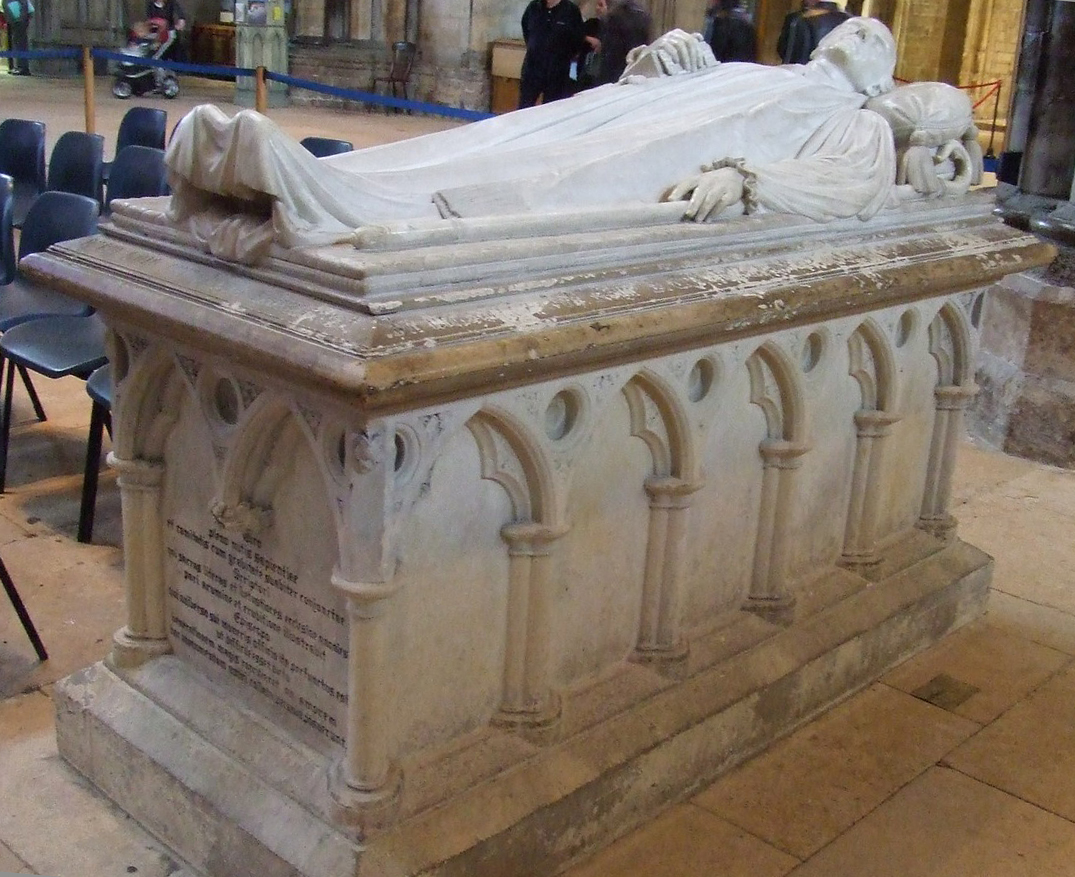
Kaye's memorial tomb in Lincoln Cathedral

Academic offices
Preceded by Thomas Browne	Master of Christ's College, Cambridge; 1814–1830	Succeeded by John Graham
Church of England titles
Preceded by William Lort Mansel	Bishop of Bristol; 1820–1827	Succeeded by Robert Gray
Preceded by George Pelham	Bishop of Lincoln; 1827–1853	Succeeded by John Jackson
