= Bishop Burton College =

Agricultural college in Yorkshire, England

Coordinates: 53.84826°N 0.50405°W

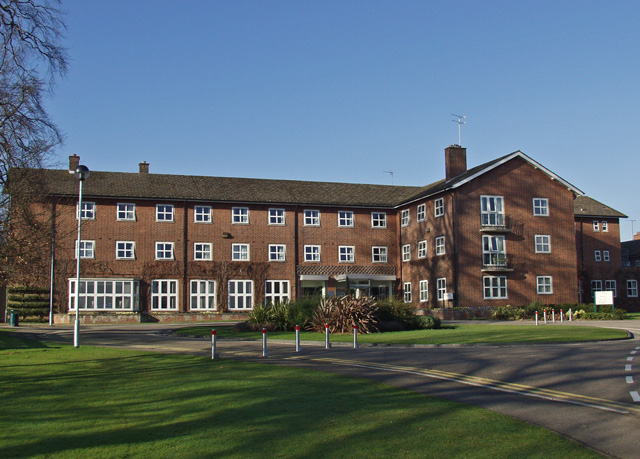
Administration building Bishop Burton College

Bishop Burton College is a further education land-based college founded in Bishop Burton, East Riding of Yorkshire, England.

== History ==
The college was established in 1954 as the Bishop Burton Farm Institute and was one of the first in the country to be awarded Beacon Status in May 1999 for 'the exceptional quality of its agricultural courses as well as outstanding student support'. The college was the first land-based college in the United Kingdom to achieve both parts of the Learning and Skill Council's Training Quality Standard. In October 2002, the University of Hull agreed to validate the land-based undergraduate courses at the college. A February 2017 Ofsted inspection report rated the college's overall effectiveness as 'good'. In June 2017, the college was ranked bronze by the Teaching Excellence Framework according to its standard of undergraduate teaching.

In July 2005, the college unveiled plans for a £17 million redevelopment, which would result in new facilities for animals, learning, sports and student accommodation. The main site in Bishop Burton has a 360-hectare mixed farm which includes a high-welfare pig unit and sheep facilities. There is residential accommodation for 300 students, two hostels, a gym, sports hall and numerous catering establishments.

In August 2012, the college took over from the University of Lincoln the delivery of further education courses being run at Riseholme College. The college was selected following a competitive tendering process led by the Skills Funding Agency (SFA) and the Young People's Learning Agency (YPLA). In October 2013, the college proposed building a new £13.5 million site on the Lincolnshire Showground, just outside Lincoln, as the lease in the present Riseholme location was due to expire in 2020. It was envisaged that a phased move could see courses start in September 2015. In January 2014, the college was granted permission by the West Lindsey District Council to move to the grounds. In October 2014, construction began after £6 million had been secured from the Skills Funding Agency Capital Investment Fund. The new campus was to have science laboratories, agriculture, engineering and arboriculture workshops, an animal management facility, a farm and a halls of residence for students. It was expected that a significant portion of the college's intake was to be attracted from South Yorkshire.

In March 2008, the college was listed as being an equestrian training venue for the 2008 Summer Olympics. In October 2008, a new £3 million equestrian centre was opened by the Princess Royal. The centre formed part of the college's £25 million campus and was designed to hold competitions and events, as well as lectures. The indoor arena was to be used as a training base for the 2012 Summer Olympics and eventually served as a training centre for the Great Britain pentathlon team. In June 2011, Olympian Jonathan Edwards visited the college in his role as part of the organising committee for the London games and in October 2012 dressage rider Richard Davidson taught a master class at the college. In July 2014, the college was the only institution to qualify for both leagues of the finals of the British Universities and Colleges Sport (BUCS) equestrian competition.

== Courses ==
The college offers a range of land-based and non-land-based further education and higher education courses, such as BTECs and honours degrees. The college also offers apprenticeships and work-based learning opportunities.

Each year the college hosts an annual stockmanship competition.

== See also ==
- List of UCAS institutions
- List of universities in the United Kingdom
