= Jeudwine =

Jeudwine may refer to:

- George Jeudwine (1849–1933), English priest
- Hugh Jeudwine (1862–1942), British Army officer
