= William Kaye (priest) =

Anglican priest

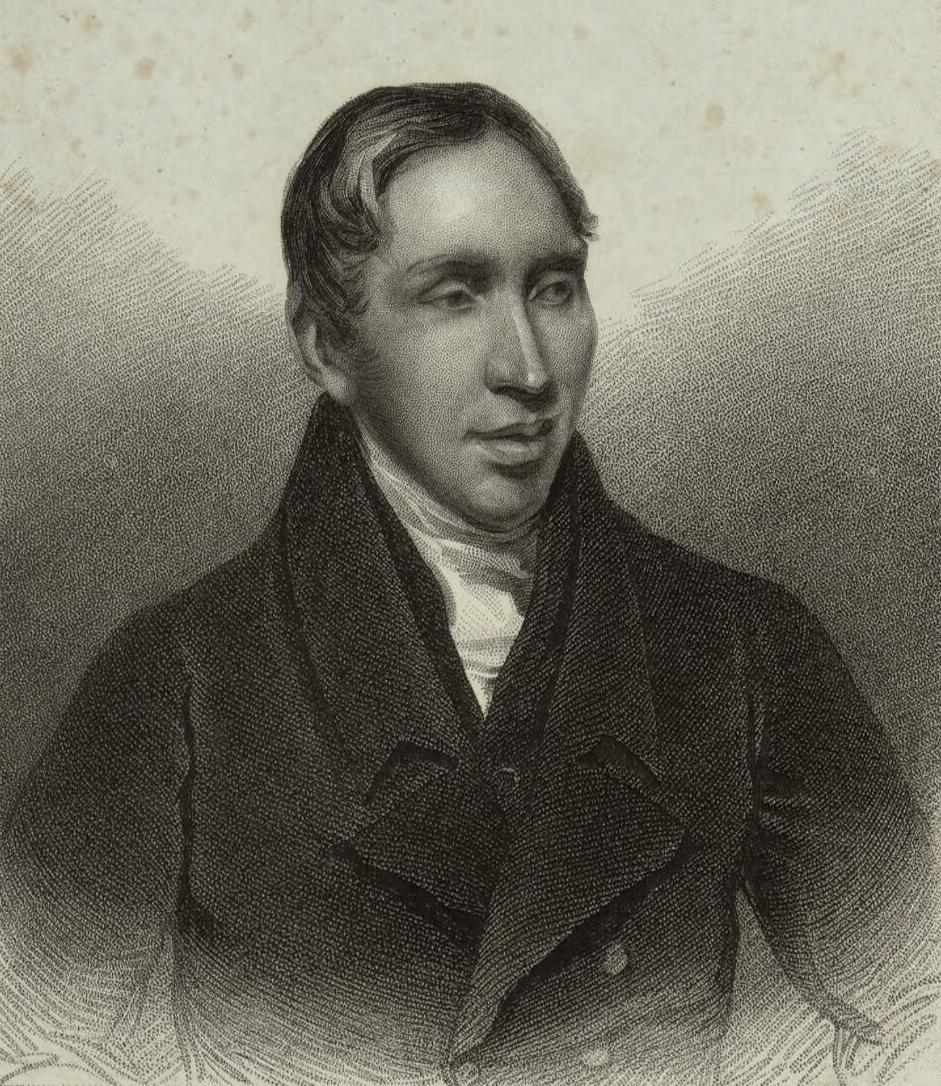
Portrait of Revd. William Kaye

William Frederick John Kaye (13 November 1822 – 9 June 1913) was an eminent Anglican priest in the second half of the nineteenth century and the first decades of the twentieth.

Kaye was born in Cambridge, the only son of John Kaye, Bishop of Lincoln, and Eliza Mortlock. He was educated at Eton and Balliol. He was ordained in 1846 and became the incumbent at Riseholme. He was Archdeacon of Lincoln from 1863 until his death in Lincoln, aged 90.

Kaye married Mary, daughter of Bishop John Jackson.

Church of England titles
Preceded by Henry Kaye Bonney	Archdeacon of Lincoln; 1963–1913	Succeeded by George Wynne Jeudwine
