= LPAC (disambiguation) =

LPAC is a Super PAC founded in 2012 to represent the interests of lesbians in the United States.

LPAC may also refer to:

- LaRouche Political Action Committee, a political action committee comprising part of the Worldwide LaRouche Youth Movement
- Liberty Political Action Conference, a political conference held annually by Campaign for Liberty
- Lincoln Performing Arts Centre, an auditorium in Lincoln, England
- London Planning Advisory Committee, a former organisation of local government in London, England
- Lossless predictive audio compression, a lossless audio compression algorithm
- L-PAC, a chemical substance
