= Super League Under 19s =

Sports league

- Founded: 2013
- Country: England
- Number of clubs: 13
- Current champions: Wigan Warriors U19 (2019)

The Super League under 19s Academy Championship is a youth branch of the Super League competition in the sport of Rugby League which was operational between 2013 and 2019. Prior to 2013 it was the Under 20s competition and from 2020 it will be under 18s. The under 19s was the premier Super League Youth Academy competition. Wigan featured in every Grand Final winning an impressive 6 out of 7 titles with many players going on to be promoted to the first team.

== Clubs ==
Super League clubs
Colours	Club	Established	City	Stadium	Titles (Last)
	Bradford Bulls	1907	Bradford, West Yorkshire	Odsal	
	Castleford Tigers	1926	Castleford, West Yorkshire	Wheldon Road	
	Huddersfield Giants	1864	Huddersfield, West Yorkshire	John Smith's Stadium	
	Hull F.C.	1865	Hull, East Riding of Yorkshire	Bishop Burton College	
	Hull Kingston Rovers	1882	Hull, East Riding of Yorkshire	Craven Park	
	Leeds Rhinos	1864	Leeds, West Yorkshire	Stanningley ARLFC	
	London Broncos	1989	Barnet, Greater London	The Hive	
	Salford Red Devils	1873	Salford, Greater Manchester	AJ Bell Stadium	
	St. Helens	1873	St. Helens, Merseyside	Langtree Park	1 (2016)
	Wakefield Trinity Wildcats	1873	Wakefield, West Yorkshire	Belle Vue	
	Warrington Wolves	1876	Warrington, Cheshire	Halliwell Jones Stadium	
	Widnes Vikings	1875	Widnes, Cheshire	Naughton Park	
	Wigan Warriors	1872	Wigan, Greater Manchester	Edge Hall Road	6 (2019)

== Champions ==
Season	Champions	Runners-up
2013	Wigan Warriors U19	Leeds Rhinos U19
2014	Wigan Warriors U19	St Helens U19
2015	Wigan Warriors U19	Warrington Wolves U19
2016	St Helens U19	Wigan Warriors U19
2017	Wigan Warriors U19	Castleford Tigers U19
2018	Wigan Warriors U19	St Helens U19
2019	Wigan Warriors U19	St Helens U19
