= Arthur Smith (priest) =

Arthur Cyril Smith, VRD was an Anglican priest, who served as Archdeacon of Lincoln from 1960 to 1976; and also a member of the General Synod from 1970 to 1976.

He was educated at St. John's College, University of Manitoba, the University of Sheffield and Westcott House, Cambridge; and ordained in 1935. After a curacies in Keighley and Bishop's Hatfield he was a Chaplain in the RNVR during World War II. When peace returned he became Rector of South Ormsby, a post he held until 1960.

Church of England titles
Preceded by Kenneth Healey	Archdeacon of Lincoln; 1960–1976	Succeeded by Michael Edgar Adie
