= Raphael Throckmorton =

Raphael Throckmorton (1632–1709) was an Anglican priest who served as Archdeacon of Lincoln from 1645 until his death.

Throckmorton was born in South Ormsby and educated at Christ Church, Oxford. His grandfather, also named Raphael Throckmorton, was the rector of St Peter & St Paul, Bolingbroke, Lincolnshire from 1574 until 1610.

He received the degree of Doctor of Divinity (DD). He held livings at Swaby and South Ormsby; and was buried at St Andrew Holborn in the City of London.
