= Michael Brackenbury =

English Anglican priest (1930–2022)

Michael Palmer Brackenbury (6 July 1930 – 4 February 2022) was an English Anglican priest who served as Archdeacon of Lincoln from 1988 to 1995.

Brackenbury was born on 6 July 1930. He was educated at Norwich School and Lincoln Theological College. He was a curate in South Ormsby from 1966 to 1969. After this he was Rector of Sudbrooke from 1969 to 1977; then Diocesan Director of ordinands from 1977 to 1987. From 1979 until 1995 he was a Canon and Prebendary of Lincoln Cathedral.

Brackenbury died on 4 February 2022, at the age of 91.

Church of England titles
Preceded by Ronald James Milner	Archdeacon of Lincoln; 1988–1995	Succeeded by Arthur Hawes
