= The Engine Shed =

Entertainment venue in Lincoln, England

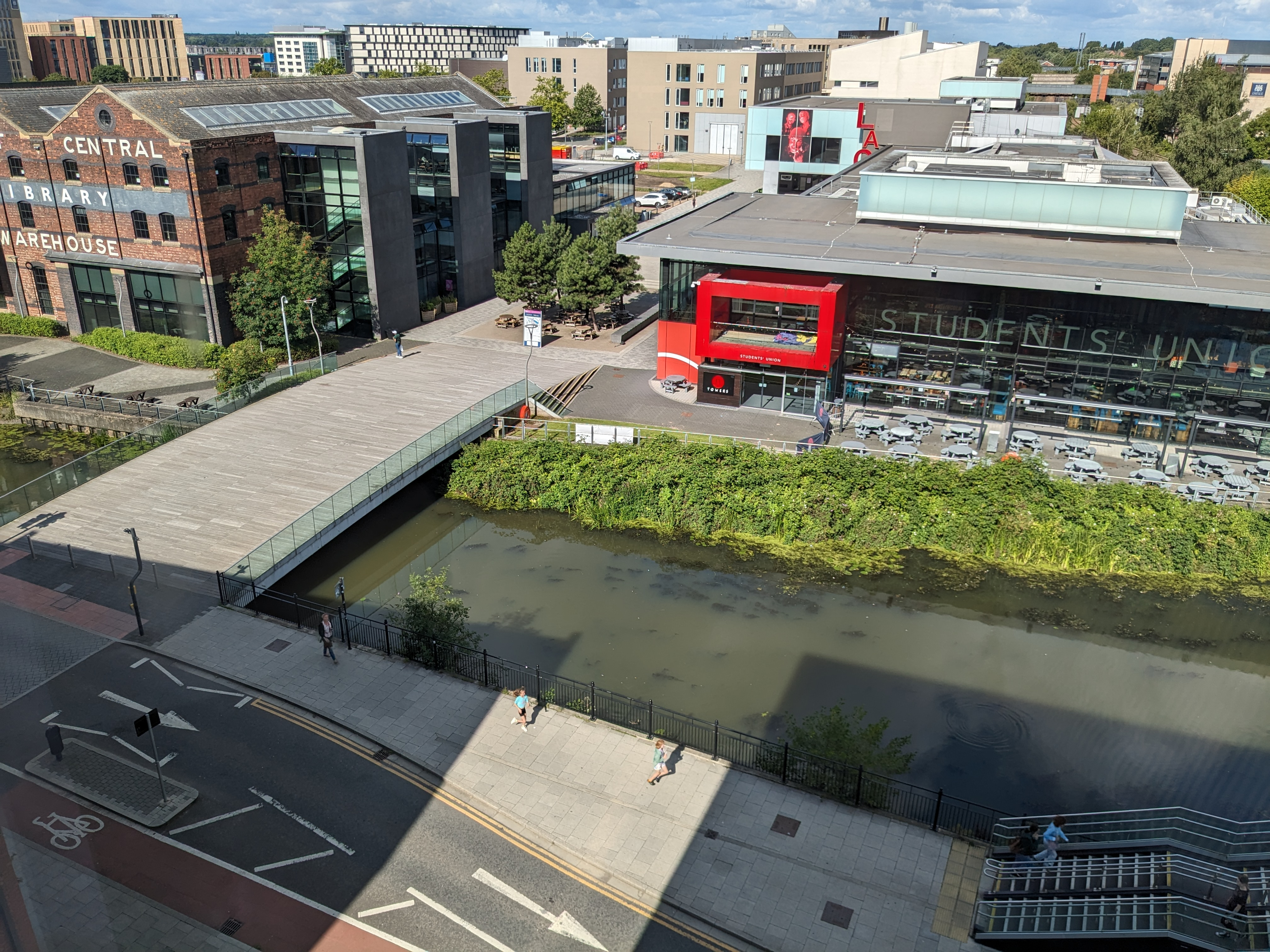
- Engine Shed, looking along the River Witham

- Location within Lincolnshire

General information
- Type: Music venue
- Architectural style: Opaque glass facade with tinted glass openings
- Location: University of Lincoln, Brayford Pool, Lincoln, LN6 7TS
- Coordinates: 53°13′38″N 0°32′43″W
- Elevation: 10 m (33 ft)
- Inaugurated: September 2006
- Renovation cost: £6 million
- Client: University of Lincoln Students' Union
- Landlord: University of Lincoln

Dimensions
- Other dimensions: 1,800 (Main Room Standing)

Technical details
- Floor area: 3,850 sq metres

Design and construction
- Architect: Nigel Stevenson

Renovating team
- Architect: Stem Architects
- Structural engineer: Ward Cole

The Engine Shed is a music and entertainment venue at the University of Lincoln in Lincoln, Lincolnshire, England, and is operated by the University of Lincoln Students' Union. The venue comprises three areas: The Engine Shed, which is the main hall; The Platform, which is a smaller floor overlooking the main hall; and Towers, which is a sports bar serving food and drink split over two floors.

== History ==
It was opened in September 2006 and takes its name from the locomotive shed that used to lie in its current location, immediately adjacent to the Nottingham/Doncaster-Lincoln Line.The venue has a capacity of 1,500 in the main hall and approximately 800 in Towers. The first live gig was Embrace on 18 September 2006. It has also staged careers fairs and hosts the University's freshers' fair. In Summer 2014 the University transferred the operation of The Engine Shed to the University of Lincoln Students' Union who continue to operate the venue to date.

== Construction ==
The building was originally constructed in 1875 for the Great Northern Railway (GNR) as Shed 40A, with four railway tracks. It had been disused since 1964. Although the Brayford site had been derelict for many years, there had been vast regeneration plans for the site including a new theatre since the early 1970s, which were killed off by Lincoln City Council in the mid-1970s for being too financially extravagant. It was too far-fetched for the financially strapped 1970s.

For many years Lincoln only had the Theatre Royal as its main venue. Although the local council had no enthusiasm for a theatre or venue on the Brayford site, the University resumed plans for a much-needed music venue.

The building is at the eastern end of the university campus, and is near the point where the River Witham joins Brayford Pool (Foss Dyke) from the south.

=== Design ===
There were two phases in the design, the first phase became what is now The Engine Shed, and the second phase became the Lincoln Performing Arts Centre. The consulting engineers were Ward Cole, who designed many other new buildings in the Brayford area. The architects were Stem Architects who are based in Sparkhouse Studios on the University campus, and have designed many of the other buildings for the University.

Construction began in February 2005. The topping out ceremony was on 16 May 2006.

== Performances ==
It has hosted a number of high-profile rock bands including James, The Wombats, Stereophonics, Embrace, The Zutons, The Charlatans, Ocean Colour Scene, Editors, Beautiful South, LostAlone, Deftones, Shiny Toy Guns, Babyshambles, Feeder, The Cribs, Athlete, Kings of Leon, Dirty Pretty Things, Kasabian, The Hoosiers, Razorlight, Dizzee Rascal, Fratellis, Blossoms, The Damned and Marina And The Diamonds.

In addition to this, it played host to Thirty Seconds to Mars. The concert was broadcast on Radio 1, for their Radio 1 Student tour.

The venue has also played host to a number of top comedians, including Jason Manford, Russell Howard, Rhod Gilbert and Stewart Lee.
