= Ketsby =

Hamlet in the South Ormsby, Lincolnshire, England

Coordinates: 53.268560°N 0.05127°E

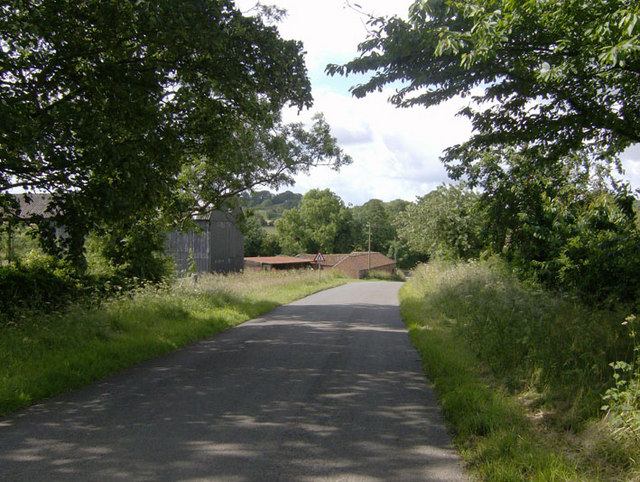
- Ketsby

- Location within Lincolnshire
- OS grid reference: TF368765
  - London: 120 mi (190 km) S
- Civil parish: South Ormsby
- District: East Lindsey
- Shire county: Lincolnshire
- Region: East Midlands
- Country: England
- Sovereign state: United Kingdom
- Post town: Louth
- Postcode district: LN11
- Police: Lincolnshire
- Fire: Lincolnshire
- Ambulance: East Midlands
- UK Parliament: Louth and Horncastle

Ketsby is a hamlet in the civil parish of South Ormsby in the East Lindsey district of Lincolnshire, England. It is situated 5 miles (8.0 km) west from the town of Alford. The population of the hamlet is included in the civil parish of Brinkhill.

Ketsby is listed in the Domesday account with 18 households, a meadow of 60 acres (0.24 km^{2}) and a mill.

An early medieval cresset lamp, with a maltese cross carved on the base, was found at Ketsby and is now in Lincoln City and County Museum.

Ketsby water mill and mill house are built in yellow brick, date from 1864, and are Grade II listed buildings. The mill is no longer in operation.

The Greenwich Prime Zero meridian line passes through the hamlet.
