= University of Lincoln =

Public university in Lincoln, England

- Motto: Latin: Libertas per Sapientiam
- Motto in English: Freedom through wisdom
- Type: Public
- Established: 1861 – Hull School of Art; 1905 – Endsleigh College; 1976 – Hull College; 1992 – University of Humberside; 1996 – University of Lincolnshire and Humberside; 2001 – University of Lincoln
- Academic affiliations: ACU; Universities UK; Defence Universities Alliance
- Budget: £212million (2020/21)
- Chancellor: Lord Kakkar
- Vice-Chancellor: Neal Juster
- Administrative staff: 2,119
- Students: 19,560 (2024/25)
- Undergraduates: 12,830 (2024/25)
- Postgraduates: 6,725 (2024/25)
- Location: Lincoln, Lincolnshire, England, UK
- Campus: Riseholme – 494 acres (200 ha) Lincoln – 70 acres (28 ha) Holbeach – 11 acres (4.5 ha)
- Colours: Blue
- Website: lincoln.ac.uk

The University of Lincoln is a public research university in Lincoln, England, with origins dating back to 1861. It gained university status in 1992 and its present name in 2001. The main campus is in the heart of the city of Lincoln alongside the Brayford Pool. There are satellite campuses across Lincolnshire in Riseholme and Holbeach and graduation ceremonies take place in Lincoln Cathedral.

== History ==
=== 19th and 20th centuries ===
The University of Lincoln developed out of several educational institutions, including Hull School of Art (1861), Hull Technical Institute (1893), the Roman Catholic teacher-training Endsleigh College (1905), Hull Central College of Commerce (1930), and Kingston upon Hull College of Education (1913). These merged in 1976 into Hull College of Higher Education, with a change of name to Humberside College of Higher Education in 1983, absorbing several courses with international reputations and recruitment established by Grimsby College of Technology in fishing, food and manufacturing, which were delivered across both sites.

In 1992 it was one of many UK institutions to become full universities, as the University of Humberside.

The university developed a new campus to the southwest of Lincoln city centre, championed as a key regeneration policy by the new coalition administration of Lincolnshire County Council, on a site overlooking the Brayford Pool. Links with Grimsby College were severed and the university's campuses in Hull closed. It was renamed the University of Lincolnshire and Humberside in January 1996, entering its first 500 Lincoln based students in September 1996.

Queen Elizabeth II opened the university's main Lincoln campus, the first new city-centre campus built in the UK for several decades. Over £375 million has been invested at Brayford Pool, transforming a city-centre brownfield site, revitalising the area and attracting investment from the retail, leisure and property sectors. Economists estimate that the university has created at least 3,000 new jobs in Lincoln and generates more than £250 million a year for the local economy – doubling previous local economic growth rates, which Rob Parker, who led the council that pushed the redevelopment project through, cited facilitating the university campus as his greatest achievement in politics.

=== 21st century ===
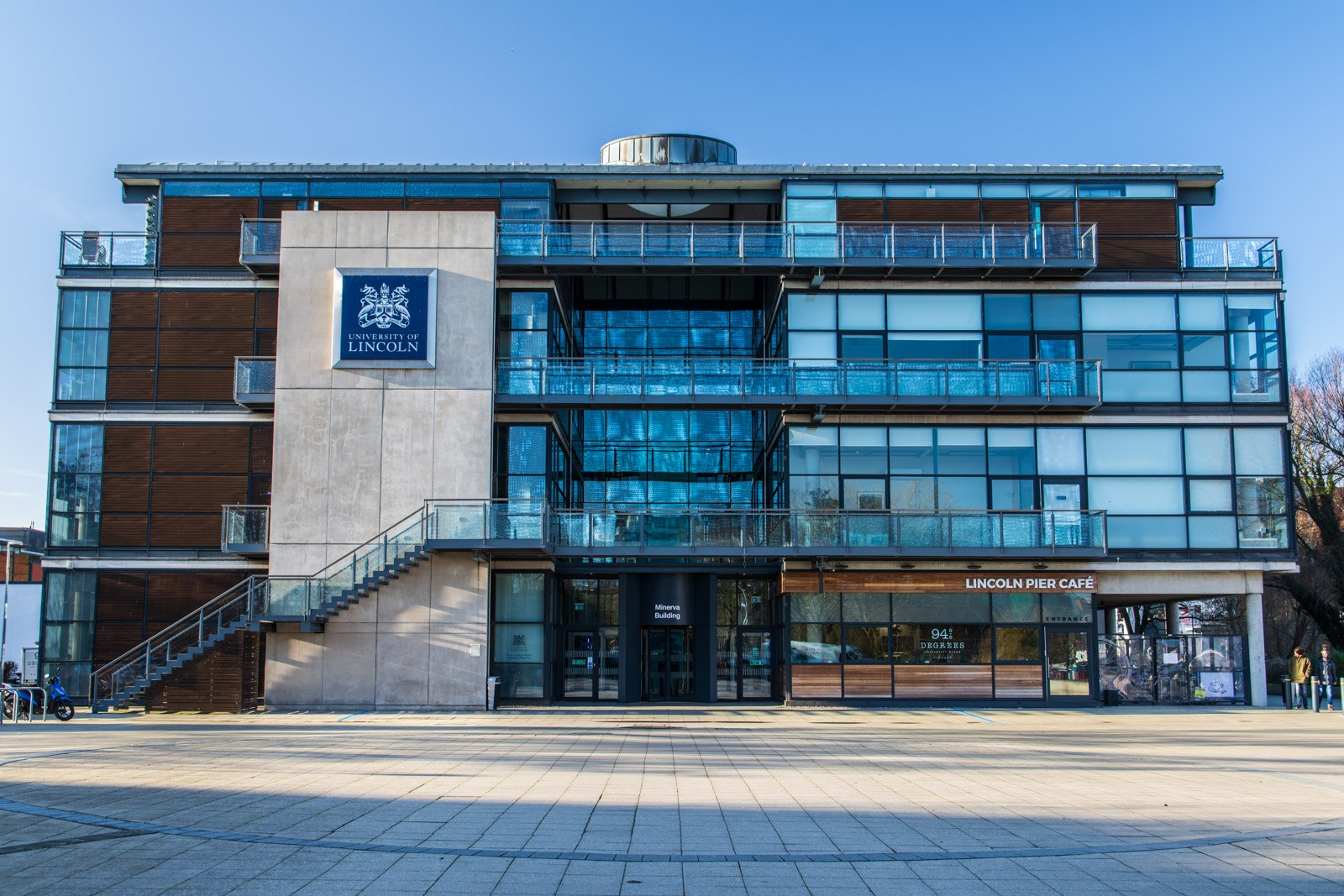
Minerva Building near the Brayford Pool

With another change of name to the University of Lincoln in October 2001, the university moved its main campus from Hull to Lincoln in 2002.

On 28 October 2004, the National Centre for Food Manufacturing at Holbeach was reopened by John Hayes, Member of Parliament for South Holland and the Deepings, after redevelopment as a specialist food-science technology park. The consolidation involved the University of Lincoln acquiring the Leicester-based De Montfort University's schools in Lincolnshire: the Lincoln School of Art in uphill Lincoln, and the Lincolnshire School of Agriculture's sites at Riseholme, Caythorpe and Holbeach. Caythorpe was later closed and its activities moved to Riseholme. Courses held in Grimsby were also moved to Lincoln at that time.

Through the late 1990s, the university's sites in Hull were scaled down as the focus shifted towards Lincoln. In 2001 this process took a step further when it was decided to move the administrative headquarters and management to Lincoln and to sell the Cottingham Road campus in Hull, the former main campus, to its neighbour, the University of Hull. The site now houses the Hull York Medical School. Until 2012 the university maintained a smaller campus, the Derek Crothall Building, in Hull city centre. Another campus and student halls in Beverley Road, Hull, were also sold for redevelopment.

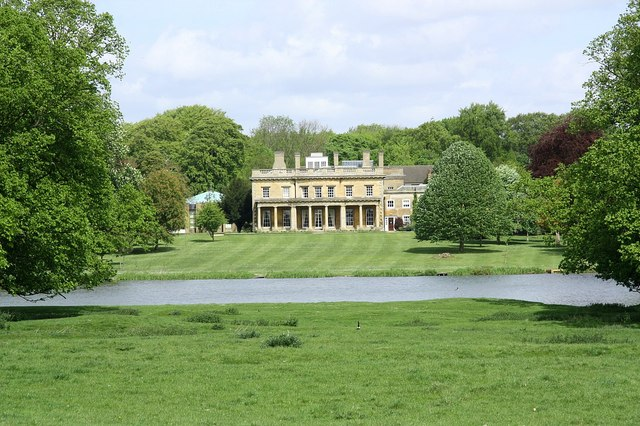
Riseholme Hall part of the University of Lincoln

In 2012 all agricultural further education provisions were transferred from Riseholme College to Bishop Burton College. Bishop Burton College has now moved into a new, purpose-built site at the Lincolnshire Showground with only limited use of the Riseholme Campus which from 2021 has mainly reverted to the University of Lincoln. Development of the site has not been decided but the university has purchased the recently vacated Lawress Hall a former training, conferencing and wedding venue on an adjacent site which was formerly owned by the Government.

March 2021 saw the new Lincoln Medical School open in time for the 2021/2022 academic year. The building, on the Brayford Pool campus, features lecture theatres, trainee observation theatres and a library dedicated to medical research, allied health care, pharmacy, chemistry and biology textbooks. It is run as a partnership with the University of Nottingham Medical School.

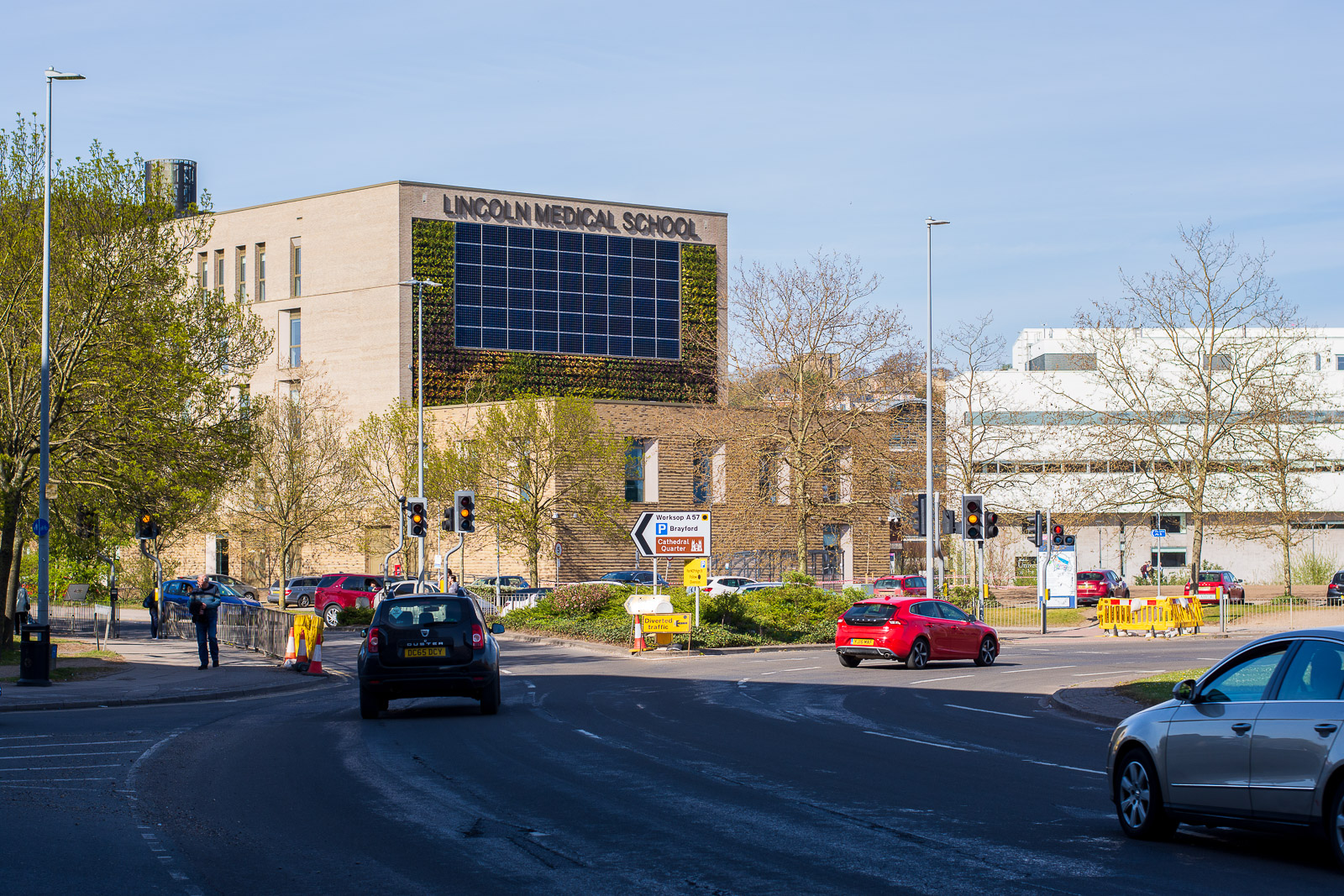
The medical School

== Organisation and administration ==
=== Academic Colleges and schools ===
The University of Lincoln is structured as a college and school-based system. There are two colleges (changed from four on 1 August 2023) involved in research and teaching, each headed by a pro-vice-chancellor:

College of Health and Science

- School of Engineering and Physical Sciences
- School of Health and Care Sciences
- School of Natural Sciences
- School of Psychology, Sport Science, and Wellbeing
- School of Sport and Exercise Science
- Lincoln Medical School
- Lincoln Institute for Agri-food Technology
- National Centre for Food Manufacturing

College of Arts, Social Sciences and Humanities

- School of Education and Communication
- School of Social and Political Sciences
- Lincoln International Business School
- Lincoln Law School
- Lincoln School of Creative Arts
- Lincoln School of Design and Architecture
- Lincoln School of Humanities and Heritage

=== The College of Health and Science ===
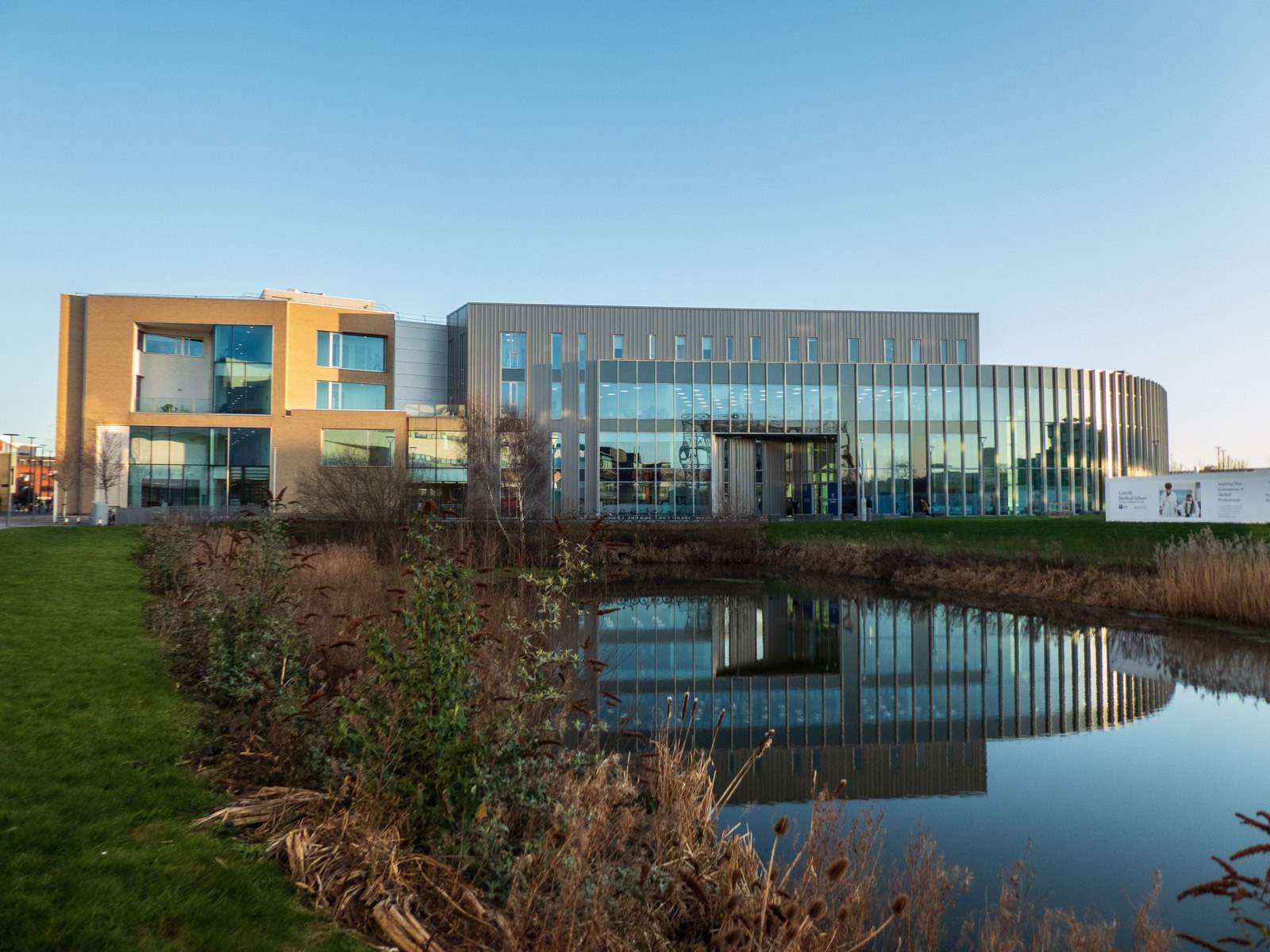
The Isaac Newton building

The College of Science is located across the Brayford, Riseholme and Holbeach campuses. The College offers subjects including agri-food technology, chemistry, computer science, engineering, food manufacturing, geography, biomedical and life sciences, mathematics, medicine, nursing and other health disciplines, pharmacy, physics, psychology, sport and exercise science, and social work and social care.

The School of Engineering became the first such school founded in the UK for over 20 years, opening in 2011 under collaboration with Siemens. The Isaac Newton Building, designed by Architects Allies and Morrison, incorporates Siemens Industrial Turbo-machinery Lincoln as a co-located its product-training facility.

The Department of Geography offers programmes accredited by the Royal Geographical Society. The Department of Life Sciences offers an animal behaviour clinic.

The School of Mathematics and Physics opened in September 2014 and was inaugurated in September 2016 by Efim Zelmanov. Physics programmes are accredited by the Institute of Physics. In 2024 the School of Mathematics and Physics has merged into the School of Engineering and Physical Sciences, which also includes subjects such as Engineering and Computer Science.

Lincoln Medical School was established in 2018 in partnership with the University of Nottingham offering registration with the General Medical Council. It is housed in the purpose built Ross Lucas Medical Sciences Building consisting of consultation rooms, a prosection anatomy suite, and a bio-medical and health sciences library.

The School of Pharmacy offers programmes accredited by the General Pharmaceutical Council. The college incorporates JBL Science a commercial research organisation.

The National Centre for Food Manufacturing is located at the Holbeach campus, with microbiology labs, product development kitchens and sensory suites.

Lincoln Institute for Agri-food Technology is based at the Riseholme campus from the 18th-century grade II listed Riseholme Hall, alongside a working farm with livestock including the Lincoln Red cattle and Lincoln Longwool sheep.

The Sarah Swift Building houses the School of Psychology and the School of Health and Social Care. It has a range of dedicated facilities in these fields, including psychology laboratories and a mock hospital ward.

The Health and Wellbeing Hub offers post-registration programmes and continuing professional development for qualified health and social care practitioners, accredited by the Health and Care Professions Council and the Nursing and Midwifery Council.

The School of Sports and Exercise Science is based in the Human Performance Centre which houses labs containing treadmills and ergometers, gas and lactate measuring equipment, motion detection, impact analysis, and an endless pool.

=== College of Arts, Social Sciences and Humanities ===
The College of Arts, Social Sciences and Humanities undertakes research and has a range of undergraduate and postgraduate programmes including Architecture, Design, Media, Journalism, Performing Arts, History, English, Business, Education, Law, Politics and Social Science. The college is the home to Siren Radio, a community radio station broadcasting on 107.3 FM and online, and the Lincoln Performing Arts Centre, a 446 seat venue, which opened in 2008.

The School of Film, Media and Journalism is home to the Media Archive for Central England. Lincoln Sound Theatre was opened in 2010 by the visiting professor Trevor Dann.

The School of Humanities and Heritage incorporates Lincoln Conservation, the university's conservation and material analysis consultancy, works with clients including the Historic Royal Palaces and the Victoria and Albert Museum.

The School of Architecture and the Built Environment offers Royal Institute of British Architects accredited programmes. Courses are available in Hong Kong at the School for Higher and Professional Education.

The Lincoln International Business School (LIBS), based in the David Chiddick Building, offers undergraduate, postgraduate and doctoral-level programmes. As a member of AACSB it is noted for a cross-functional approach to business education and diverse methods of delivery. Courses feature accreditation from the Chartered Management Institute, Chartered Institute Of Professional Development and Chartered Institute Of Logistics And Transport. It also offers distance learning and executive education aimed at working professionals, and students can participate in a student managed investment fund.

== Governance ==
=== Vice-chancellors ===
Neal Juster was installed as vice-chancellor of the university in October 2021, having previously served as deputy vice chancellor at the University of Glasgow. His background is in mechanical engineering where he was pro vice-principal, dean of the faculty of engineering at the University of Strathclyde and senior lecturer in the department of mechanical engineering, University of Leeds. The following have served as vice-chancellor of the university:

- 1989–2001: Roger King
- 2001–2009: David Chiddick
- 2009–2021: Mary Stuart
- 2021–present: Neal Juster

=== Chancellors ===
The current Chancellor, Lord Ajay Kakkar, was installed in September 2023. Lord Kakkar is Chair of King's Health Partners, the Academic Health Science Centre, Director of the Thrombosis Research Institute, London, and lectures and publishes widely on his specialism. He has worked with the NHS on its strategy to prevent venous thromboembolism (VTE). The following have served as Chancellor of the university:

- 1994–2000: Harry Hooper
- 2000–2007: Dame Elizabeth Esteve-Coll
- 2008–2023: Victor Adebowale, Baron Adebowale
- 2023–present: Lord Kakkar

=== Pro-chancellors ===
Two pro-chancellors assist the chancellor in their ceremonial duties. The current pro-chancellors are Dame Diane Lees, as the current chair of the board of governors, and Haydn Biddle as the immediate past chair. The following have served as pro-chancellor and chair of the board of governors of the university:

- 2009–2012: Graham Secker
- 2012–2018: Haydn Biddle
- 2018–present: Dame Diane Lees

== Academic profile ==
=== Reputation and rankings ===
Rankings
National rankings
- Complete (2027): 50=
- Guardian (2027): 86
- Times / Sunday Times (2027): 62

Global rankings
- QS (2027): 851–900
- THE (2026): 601–800

The university's Strategic Plan 2022-2027 sets out targets of being among the top 15 of universities in the UK. Lincoln was ranked 17th by The Guardian in 2020, its highest to date. In 2017, it ranked 8th in Agriculture and Forestry and 2nd in Business and Economics in The Complete University Guide rankings. More than half its submitted research was rated as internationally excellent or world-leading in the UK's last nationwide assessment of university research standards, the 2014 Research Excellence Framework (REF 2014). It was awarded gold in the Teaching Excellence Framework (TEF 2017).

In 2020, the university was named Modern University of the Year in The Times and Sunday Times Good University 2021, as the highest-ranked multi-faculty modern university in the UK, climbing to 45th (out of 135), its highest ever position in the guide. In the same year it was named one of the world's greatest young universities in The Times Higher Education Young University Rankings, placed 14th in the UK for overall student satisfaction of the 129 mainstream universities in the National Student Survey 2020, and given a five-star rating in the QS Stars rating of global universities.

In December 2023, the University of Lincoln was awarded the top Gold rating overall in the Teaching Excellence Framework. This also includes student experience and student outcomes.

In 2023, the university was awarded the Queens Anniversary Prize for its work in supporting the UK's food and farming industries through innovations in research, education and technology.

=== Identity ===
The University of Lincoln's official logo from 2001 to 2012 was the head of Minerva, an Ancient Roman goddess of wisdom and knowledge. From July 2012 this was changed to incorporate the university's coat of arms, which features swans, fleur de lys and textbooks.

== Campus facilities ==
=== Libraries ===
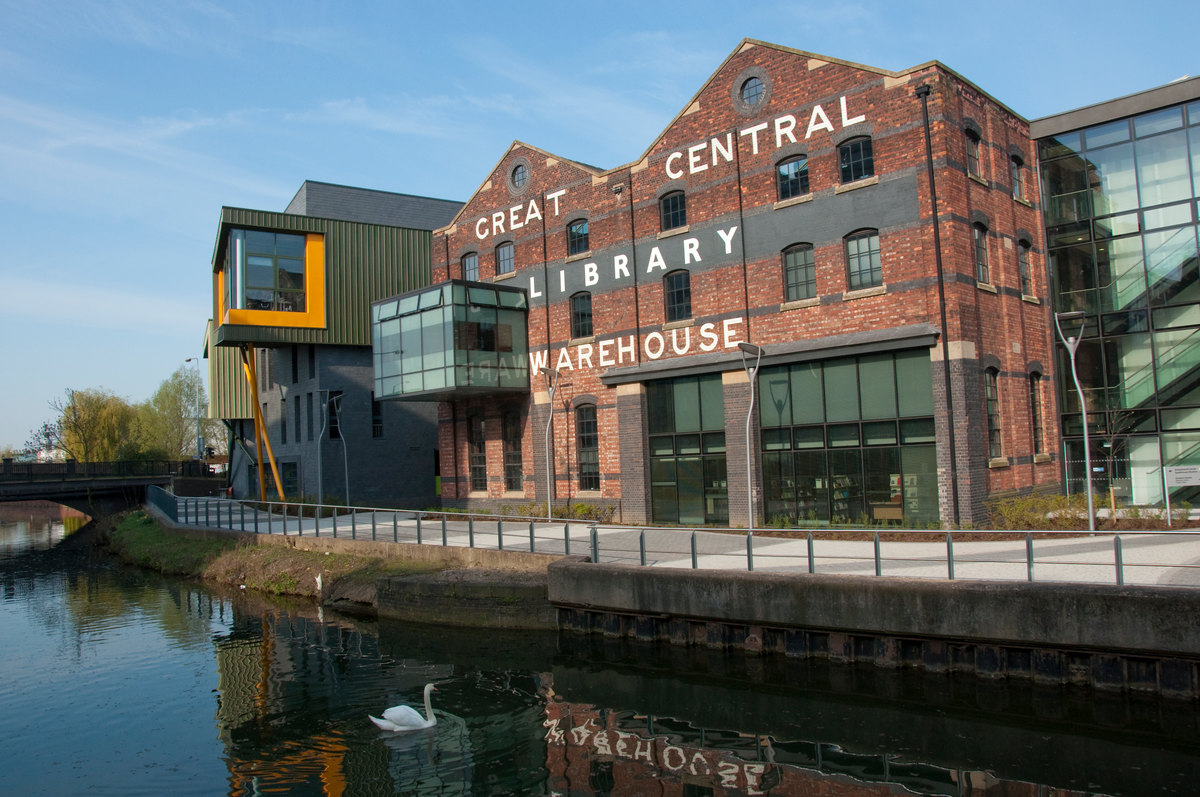
The Library at the University of Lincoln

The university Libraries and Learning Skills department has three libraries: the main University Library, a Library at the Holbeach Campus which is part of the National Centre for Food Manufacturing, and the Ross Library for Biomedical and Health Sciences at the Lincoln Medical School.

The University Library occupies the Great Central Warehouse (GCW) building, a renovated industrial railway-goods warehouse. It opened in December 2004 on the Brayford campus. In total it houses over 300,000 books, journals and other reference materials.

The Great Central Warehouse building was built in 1907 by the Great Central Railway. It spent the second half of the 20th century as a builder's warehouse, before falling into disrepair in 1998. It was converted into a library by the university's in-house team of architects and was formally opened in 2004 by the chief executive of the UK's Quality Assurance Agency for Higher Education. In 2005, the conversion won gold and silver for conservation and regeneration at the Royal Institution of Chartered Surveyors (RICS) Regional Awards in Leicester. It has also gained awards from the Royal Institute of British Architects (RIBA).

=== Live music ===
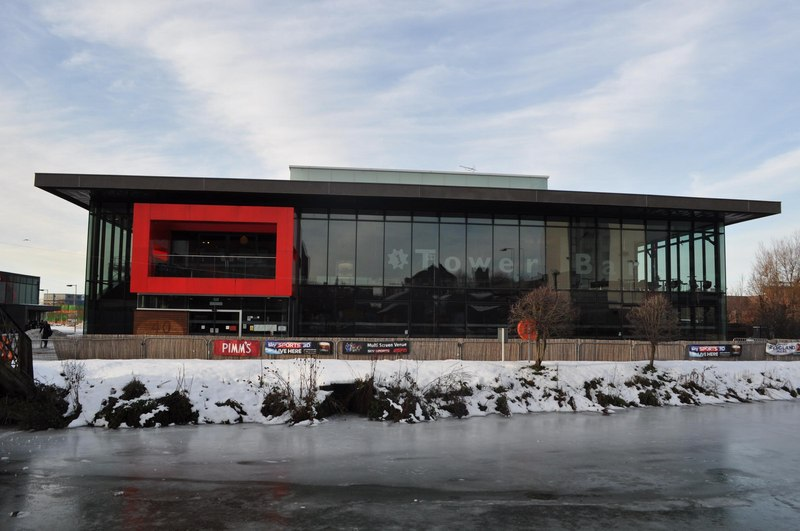
The Engine Shed

Built in 1874 by the Manchester, Sheffield & Lincolnshire Railway, the Engine Shed was the one surviving four-track, dead-end railway building in Lincolnshire. It opened as a refitted entertainment venue in September 2006 as the region's largest live music venue. It consists of the Engine Shed, the Platform and Tower Bar, which combined can accommodate up to 2,000 people. In 2014 the university transferred control of The Engine Shed to the Students' Union.

=== Lincoln Arts Centre ===
The Lincoln Arts Centre (LAC) holds a 450-seat multi-purpose auditorium designed for live arts performances, conferences and film screenings. Its events are designed to complement, rather than compete with those of neighbouring venues.

=== Science and Innovation Park ===
The Lincoln Science and Innovation Park is a large redevelopment south of the main university campus. It will comprise university facilities, including laboratories, and space for industry partners to add new offices and research facilities.

The Science and Innovation Park is being developed in partnership with the Lincolnshire Co-operative.

=== Sports Centre ===
Facilities include a double sports hall, four squash courts, synthetic pitches, a fitness suite, a dance studio, eight badminton and short tennis courts, two basketball courts, two volleyball courts, two netball courts, two five-a-side football pitches and a seven-a-side football pitch. It also holds the School of Sport And Exercise Science, the majority of whose facilities are located in the building.

== Student life ==
According to the university, over 100 national groupings appear among the student population at the Brayford Pool campus. Based on the available 2024/25 academic year data, the total student population was 14,095 undergraduates and 2,330 postgraduates.

=== Students' Union ===
The University of Lincoln Students' Union dates back to the university's formation. It was reconstituted in 2007 as a company limited by guarantee, and registered as a charity, introducing a more conventional governance structure for students' unions. It supports and represents the students of the university; sabbatical officers are elected by the student body and supported by the staff. A number of sports teams operate in the national BUCS' leagues, competing nationally against other institutions.

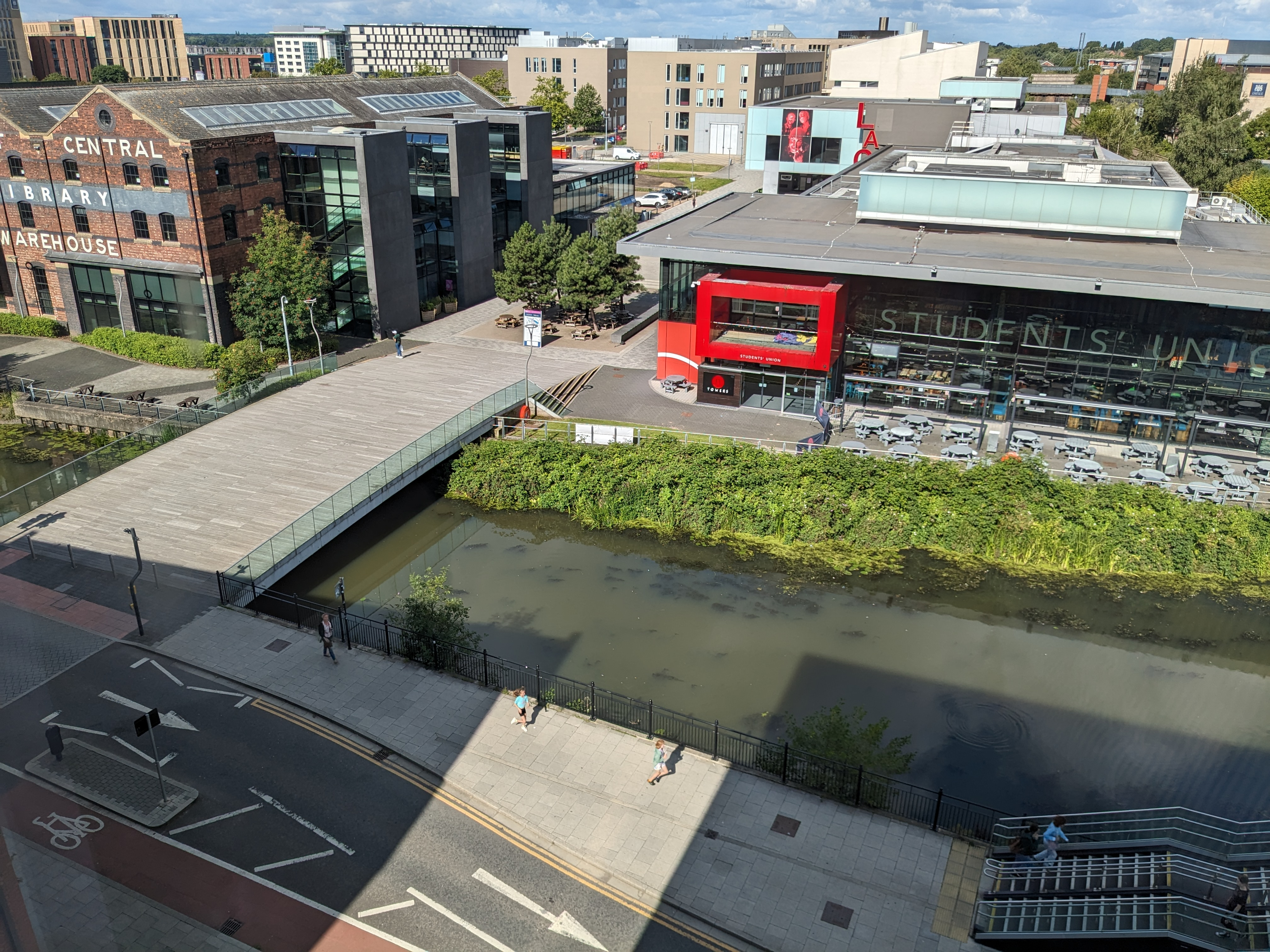
University of Lincoln Central Library and Students’ Union

The Students' Union was awarded NUS (National Union of Students) Higher Education Students' Union of the Year 2014/15 at an annual awards ceremony.

In 2014, ownership of the on-campus pub The Shed was transferred to the Students' Union after its acquisition from Greene King. It was later renamed The Swan. In 2015, the Students' Union was awarded Best Bar None Gold and named second in the Best Bar None Safest Venue category.

In 2016, after a student referendum, the Students' Union voted to disaffiliate from the NUS, due to dissatisfaction after the controversial 2016 NUS Conference. The decision was taken to formally leave the NUS in December, but a second referendum was held after approaches from students who opposed the first vote. The re-run had 1,302 students voting to remain part of the NUS and 437 backing disaffiliation.

The issue arose again in 2019, after consultations with students at All Student Member meetings in 2018 and 2019. However, the backlash across the student body caused a referendum to be held to leave the NUS. This proposed disaffiliation from the NUS on 1 January 2020: a total of 2614 (15.7%) of students voted, with 996 to remain, 1,539 to leave and 79 abstaining.

=== Student accommodation ===
Lincoln offers many accommodation options for students. The university owns and operates the Student Village, including the Lincoln Courts and Cygnet Wharf, a waterfront complex situated on the Brayford Pool Campus. In Lincoln Courts, there are 17 blocks of self-catering apartments, each apartment housing five to eight students, and Cygnet Wharf, three buildings with flats of 10–12 residents. The site has a range of facilities, with a total of 1,037+ bedrooms available including apartments specifically designed for students with disabilities.

Furthermore, there is a range of other University-owned and private off-campus student accommodation in Lincoln.

== Notable people ==
=== Academics ===
- Jane Chapman – Professor of Communications
- Carenza Lewis – Professor for the Public Understanding of Research
- Stephen McKay – Professor of Social Research
- Daniel Mills - Professor of Veterinary Behavioural Medicine
- Chris Packham - Visiting Professor

=== Alumni ===
- Gordon Baldwin – potter
- David Firth – animator and visual artist
- Jonathan Foyle – architectural historian
- Andrea Jenkyns – MP for Morley and Outwood
- Tom Marshall – photo colouriser and model maker
- Paul Noble – visual artist
- Vicki Phillips – educator and director at the Bill & Melinda Gates Foundation
- Chris Rankin – film actor
- Thomas Ridgewell, commonly known as TomSka – YouTube video creator
- Jayne Sharp – broadcaster
- Paul Staines – political blogger for the Guido Fawkes website
- Martin Vickers – MP for Cleethorpes
- Juan Watterson – MHK for Rushen and Speaker of the House of Keys
- Dan Wood – broadcaster
- Leigh Ingham – MP for Stafford

== See also ==
- Armorial of UK universities
- College of Education
- Lincoln College of Art
- List of universities in the UK
- National Centre for Food Manufacturing
- Post-1992 universities
