= Mary Stuart (academic) =

Mary Stuart CBE
- Born: c.1957 South Africa
- Education: University of Cape Town, Open University
- Occupation: former Vice Chancellor
- Employer: University of Lincoln

Prof. Mary Stuart CBE (born c.1957) is a South African born academic and the former Vice Chancellor of the University of Lincoln.

== Life ==
Stuart was born in South Africa and she attended a dance school there. She later moved to what was then Rhodesia before relocating with her husband to the United Kingdom. For a while, they and their children lived in a homeless hostel until the council supplied accommodation.

She attended the University of Cape Town and later obtained a doctorate in Social Policy from the Open University in 1998.

She was appointed to be Vice Chancellor at the University of Lincoln in 2009 following on from David Chiddick. Her research interests are life histories, social mobility, students and community development. Stuart notes that a university in Lincoln was only created as a trial. She entered into an unusual collaboration with Siemens who was a local employer. The company assists in choosing the head of the university's Engineering department. Stuart is aware this is unusual, but she remembers South Africa where large companies were a more positive influence than the government. Stuart is supported by five Deputy Vice-Chancellors.

In 2018, she was awarded a CBE.
