= Charles Goddard (priest) =

Charles Goddard (1770–1848) was an Anglican priest, the Archdeacon of Lincoln from 1817 to 1844.

He was born at Marylebone 11 December 1769. He matriculated at Christ Church, Oxford in 1787, graduating M.A. by decree in March 1821, and B.D. and D.D. the same year. He held incumbencies at St James Garlickhythe and St Denys, Ibstock. He died on 21 January 1848.

Church of England titles
Preceded by John Pretyman	Archdeacon of Lincoln; 1817–1844	Succeeded by Henry Bonney
