= Morgan Wynne =

Welsh-born priest

Morgan Wynne (1585–1644) was an Anglican priest who served as Archdeacon of Lincoln from 1627 until his death.

Wynne was born in Denbighshire and educated at University College, Oxford, graduating BA in 1609. He later received the degree of Doctor of Divinity (DD). He held livings at Cilcain, Llanrwst, Stilton, Symondsbury, Cranford St John, Brasted and Scotter.
