= John Pretyman =

John Pretyman (1753/1754 – 5 June 1817) was an Anglican priest, who served as Archdeacon of Lincoln from 1793 to 1817.

He was educated at Pembroke College, Cambridge, where he started in 1774 age 20; and ordained deacon on 15 March 1778 and priest on 8 June 1780. After a curacy at Rattlesden he was Rector of Shotley from 1784 until his death on 5 June 1817.

He died on 5 June 1817.

He is also recorded as a Prebend of Aylesbury.

Church of England titles
Preceded by John Gordon	Archdeacon of Lincoln; 1793–1817	Succeeded by Charles Goddard
