= William Railton =

English architect

- Born: William Railton; 14 May 1800
- Died: 13 October 1877 (aged 77)

Nelson's Column in Trafalgar Square.

William Railton (1800–1877) was an English architect, best known as the designer of Nelson's Column. He was based in London, with offices at 12 Regent Street for much of his career.

== Life ==
He was born in Clapham (then in Surrey) on 14 May 1800, the son of Isaac Railton and his wife, Margaret Maria Railton, née Scott. He was a pupil of the London architect and surveyor William Inwood.

In 1825 Railton set off for a tour of Greece and Egypt. On his return to England he prepared for publication some drawings he had made of the remains of the recently excavated Kardaki Temple on Corfu. They were printed as a supplementary volume to James Stuart's Antiquities of Athens under the title of The newly-discovered Temple at Cadachio Illustrated.

In the mid-1830s, Railton carried out several commissions for Ambrose March Phillipps, a Leicestershire landowner who had converted to Catholicism at an early age. On his marriage his father, Charles March-Phillipps of Garendon Park, had given him one of the family's other Leicestershire estates, on which stood the ruins of Grace Dieu Priory. There, Railton built the Tudor Revival Grace Dieu Manor, complete with chapel. Meanwhile, Ambrose Phillipps bought - with borrowed money - a tract of land in nearby Charnwood Forest to build a monastery for a community of Trappist monks, to be named Mount St Bernard. Railton designed a church and monastic buildings, once again employing a Tudor Revival style. The church was consecrated in October 1837. Railton's buildings were, however, soon replaced by a more ambitious monastic complex to plans by Augustus Pugin. For Charles March-Philips, Railton designed lodges and gatehouses for Garendon Park, which have survived the demolition of the main house.

Railton also designed two identical Anglican churches in Charnwood Forest, at Copt Oak and Woodhouse Eaves, (consecrated on 3 September and 5 September 1837). He built further churches nearby at Groby (c.1840) and Thorpe Acre (1845), the latter on land donated by Charles March Phillipps. Also in Leicestershire, he designed Beaumanor Hall, a red-brick Jacobean mansion, for the Herrick family.

At Ripon he designed a palace for the bishop. The foundation stone was laid at a ceremony in October 1838, and by the end of 1841 it was ready for the bishop to move in. Four years later, Railton was asked to add a chapel, slightly separate from the palace, to allow the local population to worship there. In deference to the Tudor style of the palace, he chose the perpendicular style, battlemented like the main building.

Between 1838 and 1848 he was employed as architect to the Ecclesiastical Commissioners for whom he produced two standard designs for parsonages. During this time he also remodelled Riseholme as a house for the Bishop of Lincoln.

In 1836 he won the fourth prize in the competition to design a replacement for the Houses of Parliament which had recently been destroyed by fire, and in 1839 came first in the competition to design a monument to Admiral Lord Nelson in Trafalgar Square, London. His winning design – a simple Corinthian column topped with a statue of Nelson – was constructed between 1839 and 1842; the lions on the base, although part of the original plan, were not added until 1867.

Railton exhibited at the Royal Academy between 1829 and 1851.

He built nothing after 1850. He lived at 65 Onslow Square, Kensington, in the later part of his life, and died on 13 October 1877, while visiting Brighton.

== Works ==
- Randalls, Surrey. House for Nathaniel Bland (1830).
- St Peter, Duddon, Cheshire (1835).
- Grace Dieu, Leicestershire. House for Ambrose Phillipps (1833).
- Copt Oak church, Leicestershire (consecrated 1837).
- St Paul, Woodhouse Eaves, Leicestershire (consecrated 1837).
- Two lodges and a gatehouse (the Bavarian Gates) at Garendon Park near Loughborough, Leicestershire, for Charles Phillipps (1837–47).
- Bishop's Palace, Ripon (1838–41).
- Nelson's Column, Trafalgar Square, London (1839–42).
- St Philip and St James, Groby, Leicestershire (c.1840).
- Remodelling of Riseholme Hall as a palace for the Bishop of Lincoln (1840).
- Rebuilding of St Mary, Bromley by Bow (1842-3). Destroyed.
- St Bartholomew the Less Bethnal Green (consecrated 1844)
- Mount St Bernard Abbey, Leicestershire (opened 1844). Later demolished and replaced with buildings by Pugin.
- St Mary, Stafford Street, Wolverhampton (consecrated 1845). Demolished.
- Beaumanor Hall, Leicestershire (1845-7).
- Bishop's Palace Chapel, Ripon (1846).
- Holy Trinity, Hoxton (1848).
- Holy Trinity, Meanwood, Yorkshire (1848-9).

== Gallery ==
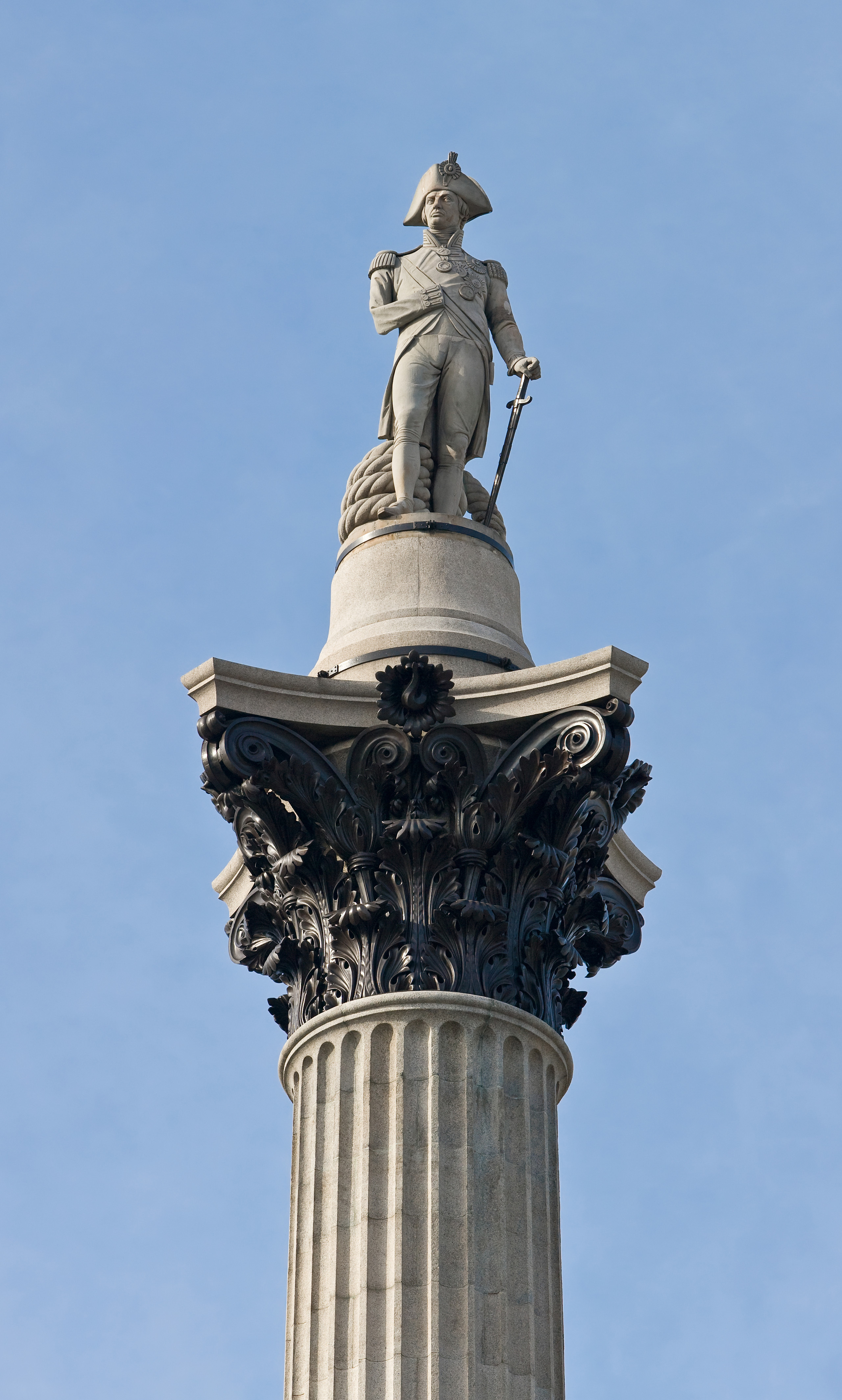
The capital and statue at the top of Nelson's Column

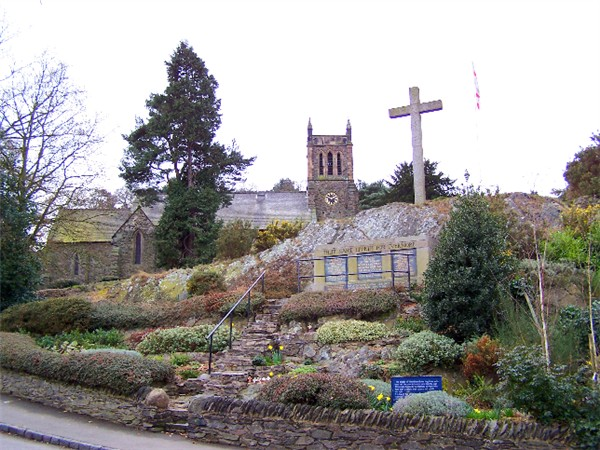
St Paul's Church, Woodhouse Eaves, 1837

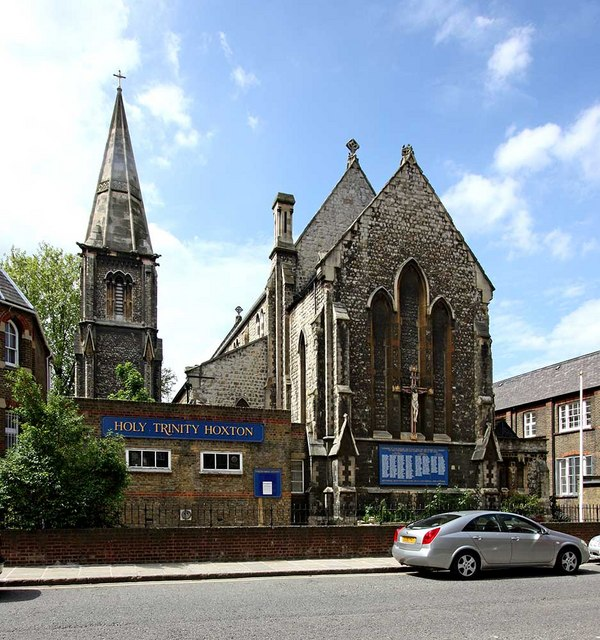
Holy Trinity Church, Shepherdess Walk, Hoxton, London N1

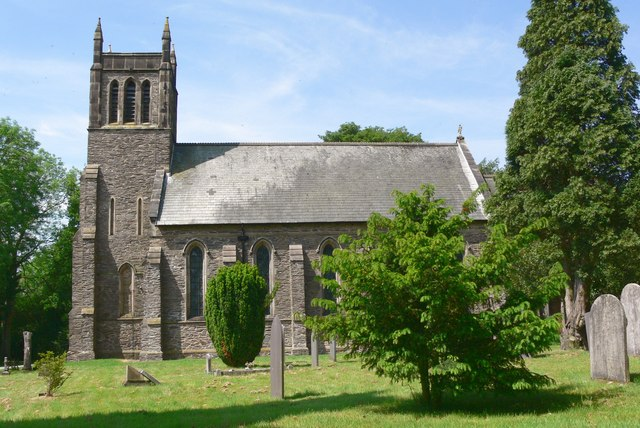
St Peter's Church, Copt Oak

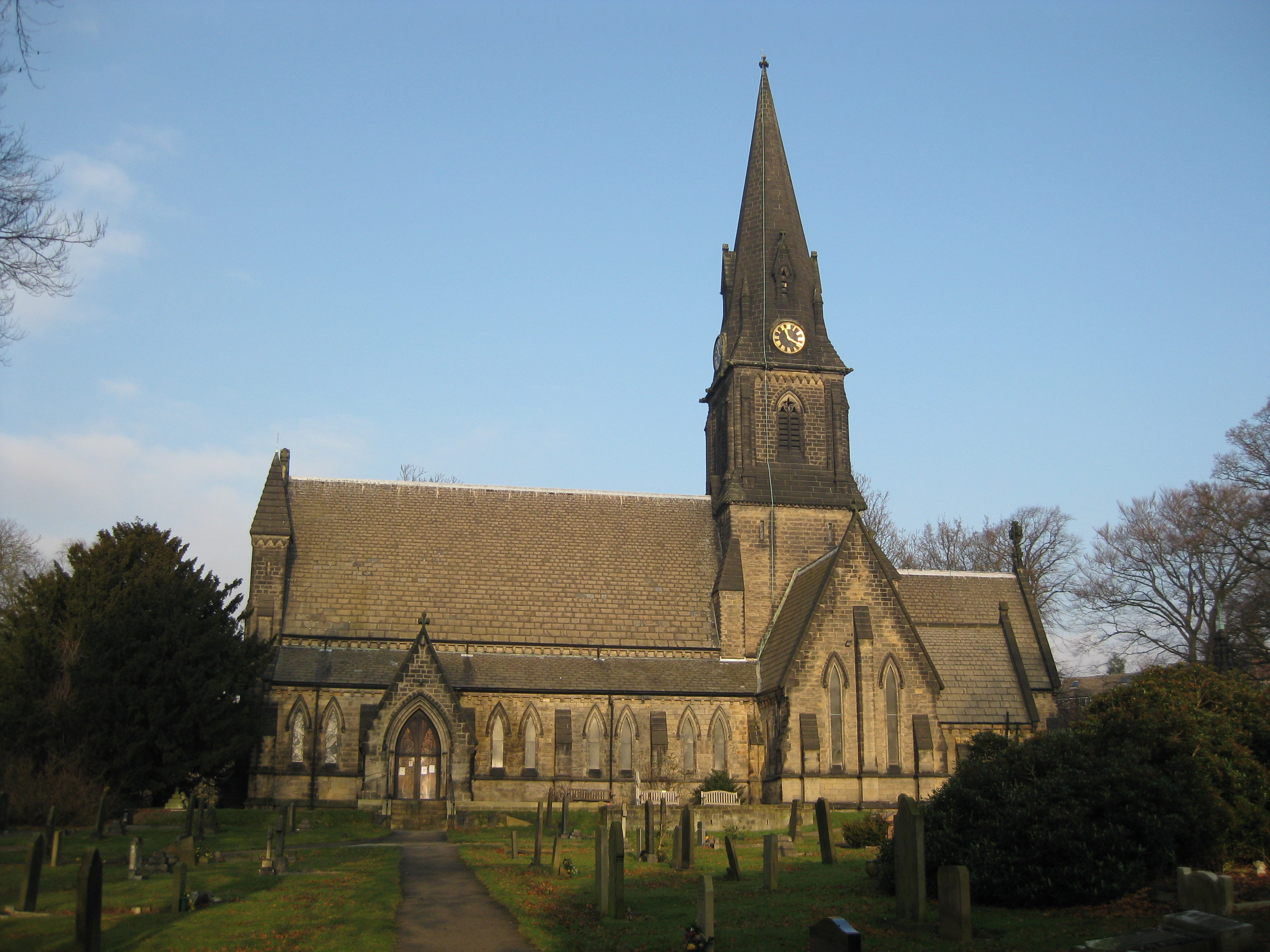
Holy Trinity Church, Meanwood, Leeds 1849

== Bibliography ==
- Purcell, Edmund Sheridan (1900). Life and Letters of Ambrose Phillipps de Lisle. Vol. 1. London: Macmillan.
