= Luke Heslop =

Luke Heslop (18 October 1738 – 23 June 1825) was an Anglican priest in the late 18th and early 19th centuries.

Heslop was educated at Corpus Christi College, Cambridge, matriculating in 1760, graduating B.A. (Senior Wrangler) 1764, M.A. 1767, B.D. 1775. He also took the Lambeth degree of D.D. in 1810. He was ordained in 1764, became a college Fellow in 1769 and a Moderator in Chemistry 1772–73.

He held the following positions in the church:

- Curate of Gislingham, Suffolk, 1764
- Vicar of St Peter le Poer, London, 1776–77
- Prebendary of St Paul's Cathedral, 1776–92
- Rector of Adstock, Buckinghamshire, 1777–1804
- Archdeacon of Buckingham, 1778–1825
- Prebendary of Lincoln Cathedral, 1778–1825
- Rector of Addington, Buckinghamshire, 1792 ("for a short time")
- Rector of Fulmer, Buckinghamshire, 1804 ("for a short time")
- Rector of Bothal, Northumberland, 1804–09
- Rector of St Marylebone, London, 1809/1810–1825 [He was the incumbent priest, but the rectory was impropriated until 1821.]
- Rector of St Stephen's and St Augustine's, Bristol, 1810–1825

He died in Marylebone on 23 June 1825.

Church of England titles
| Preceded by Pulter Forester | Archdeacon of Buckingham; 1778–1825 | Succeeded by Justly Hill |
