= Siren FM =

Siren Radio
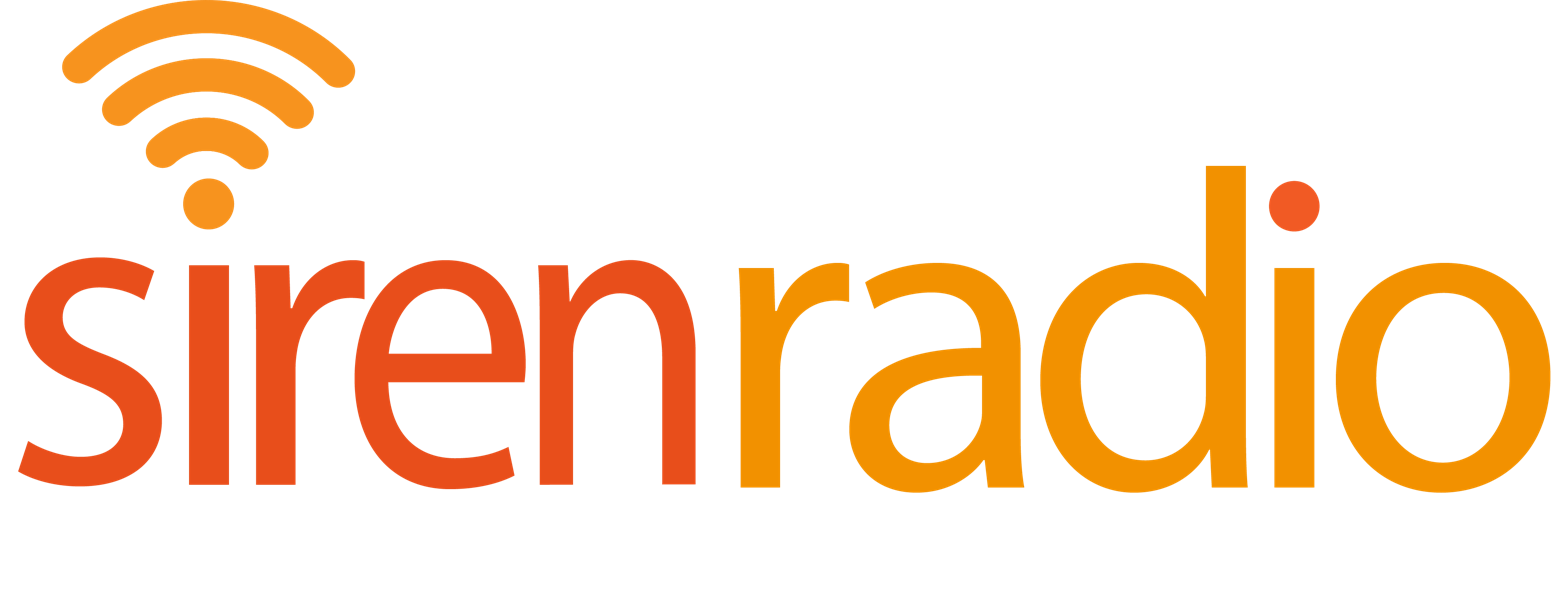
- Lincoln; England
- Frequency: 107.3 FM

Programming
- Format: Community

Ownership
- Owner: University of Lincoln; (University of Lincoln)

History
- First air date: 11 August 2007
- Last air date: 30 June 2024
- Former names: Siren FM (2007–2017)

Siren Radio, sometimes known as Siren and formerly as Siren FM, was a community radio station based at the University of Lincoln in the United Kingdom. It broadcast to the city of Lincoln on 107.3 FM and at its website, Siren Online. It ceased broadcasting on Sunday 30 June 2024.

== History ==
S.I.R.E.N. FM launched originally in 1997 at the University of Lincolnshire and Humberside's Hull campus. Its name stood for: Students In Radio Entertainment and the station was a blend of music, talk, documentaries and fun. In August 2007, Siren FM won its licence after a series of annual student RSLs (Restricted Service Licences) at the campus in Lincoln (UK).

Siren moved to Lincoln in 1998 during the first stages of the gradual move of the university to the city. After operating its annual RSLs on FM each April or May it began to augment its output by broadcasting online for much of each academic year.

At a launch party on May 8, 1999, at The Avenue nightclub, a lecturer allegedly put Zimovane (Zopiclone) into an 18-year-old female student's drink, and allegedly later raped her. At Lincoln Court in October 2000, the lecturer was tried for date rape. Police had found the date rape substance at his house, but he was cleared of the rape charge. The lecturer was subsequently jailed in November 2000 over deceiving the university about misrepresentation of his former serial convictions, for six months. The case was discussed, in great length, in parliament on March 23, 2001, by the local MP. The CRB, formed in 2001 (now the Disclosure and Barring Service or DBS) would prevent such deceptions.

The university was awarded its community radio licence by Ofcom in 2006, and began test transmissions for the new station at midday on 14 July 2007. The primary aim of the station is to serve the young people and communities of the greater Lincoln area, meaning that Siren is catering for a younger audience than its mainstream neighbours BBC Lincolnshire and Lincs FM. As a result, the station is more involved with diverse communities outside of the university since it began broadcasting programmes on 11 August 2007 under the leadership of Managing Editor Andrew David, a former BBC television and radio broadcaster. The station fitted a new antenna with a co-linear stacked dipole aerial on 20 August 2008 to improve reception in the north of the city.

Its situation on a university campus offers opportunities for students to showcase their work and in some cases undertake assessments live on air with Journalism students producing weekly news and current affairs programmes. Catering for a younger audience than the mainstream stations heard in Lincoln, once a year schoolchildren are invited to produce and present their own programmes. There have also been projects aimed at communicating language and science education to a wider audience and funds granted to support the development of community journalism. The Station is home to a number of radio shows, including music shows, talk shows like the Midweek Drive hosted by Alex Lewczuk and Lincoln Elevenses hosted by David Harding-Price, and shows about film, like The Reel Show Hosted by Corey Allen & Murray Arthur and The Afrobeats Show by Oluwatosin Soyemi.

Siren supported a number of organisations in the Lincoln area to facilitate young people's access to the media. From November 2008 it has been involved with the Lincolnshire Young Journalist Academy (LYJA) and from Sept 2009 to June 2010 was working with c1Media, the Lincolnshire Employment Accommodation Project (LEAP), Lincoln College and others in a Media Box funded project.

The station raised funds for a range of charities, including the Haiti earthquake in 2010 and the BBC's Children in Need.

Young people on Siren have been recognised with a number of broadcasting and journalism prizes. One of the contributors won 2 International Edward R Murrow Awards in 2010 for documentary and factual programming, the station was nominated in the same year for a BBC Partnership Achievement Award for its journalism and community outreach work and in 2009 a volunteer on the station was short-listed in the same category. The university's School of Journalism won the Broadcast Journalism Training Council's (BJTC's) Award for Innovation in Broadcast Journalism Training in part for their work with Siren.

In 2015 it was named East Midlands Station of the Year and has won its sixth Edward R. Murrow RTDNA award for News Documentary.

On 25 September 2017, Siren FM rebranded to be known as Siren Radio. Its new slogan is "A Fresh Sound for Lincoln".

In 2022 Ryan Jones took over as station manager.

In January 2024 the University of Lincoln's Senior Management Team announced that they were going to hand the OfCom licence back at the end of the summer term 2024. A campaign to save Siren Radio was set up.

In December 2024 the licence was transferred to Witham Radio. However, in March 2026, Brayford Broadcasting C.I.C, the company behind Witham Radio, surrendered the licence back to Ofcom.
