= John Gordon (priest, born 1726) =

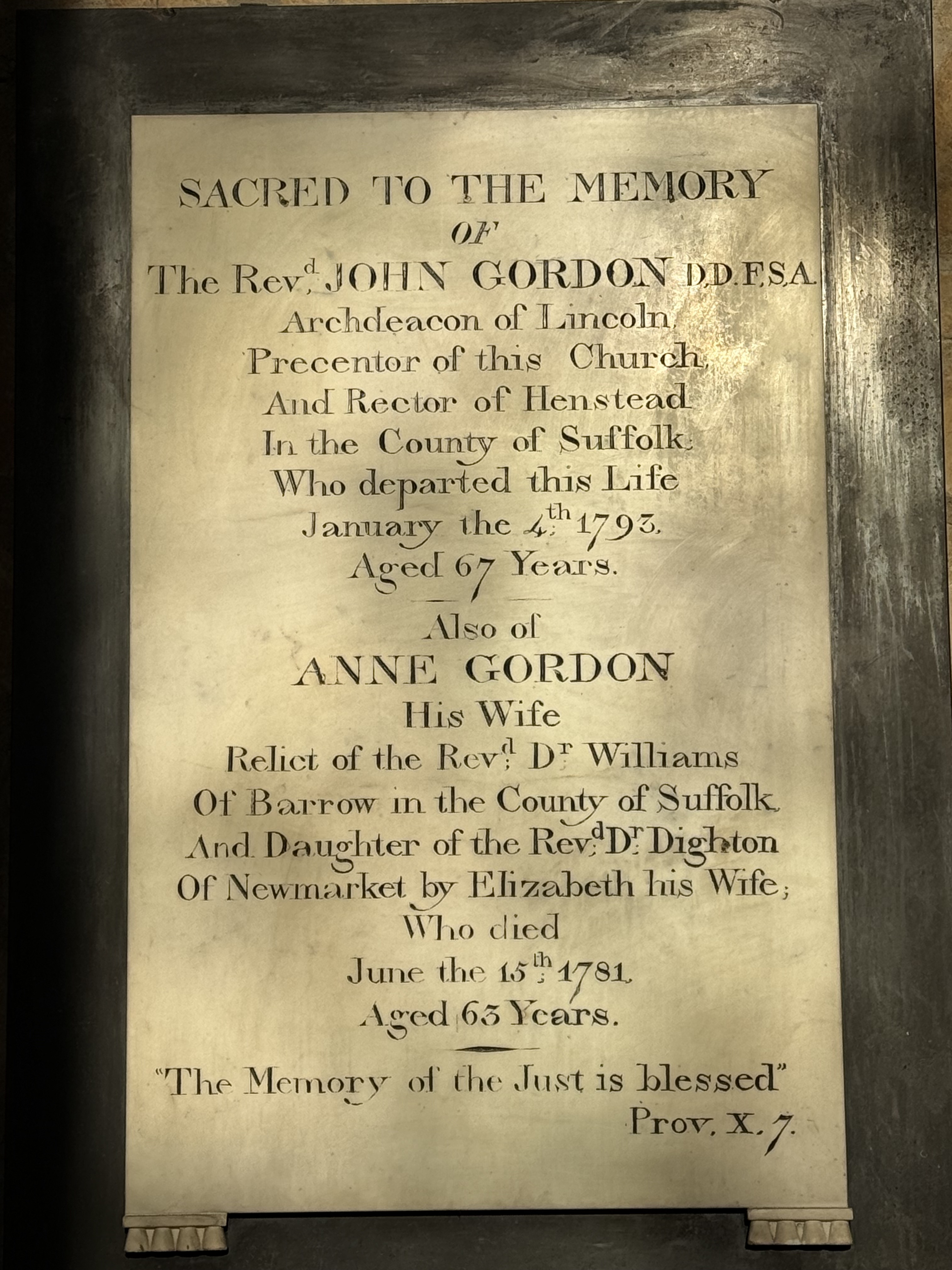
Memorial in Lincoln Cathedral

John Gordon (1726–1793) was an Anglican priest. He was educated at Peterhouse, Cambridge and ordained in 1752. He was Rector of Henstead, Suffolk from 1758 to 1793; Prebend of Aylesbury 1766 to 1769; Chaplain to the Bishop of Lincoln from 1765 to 1775; Archdeacon of Buckingham from 1766 to 1769; and Archdeacon of Lincoln from 1769 to 1793; and Precentor of Lincoln Cathedral from 1775 to 1793. He died on 5 January 1793.

Church of England titles
Preceded by John Taylor	Archdeacon of Buckingham; 1766–1769	Succeeded by Pulter Forester
Preceded by George Reynolds	Archdeacon of Lincoln; 1769–1793	Succeeded by John Pretyman
