= Thomas Marshall (archdeacon of Lincoln) =

Thomas Marshall was a 16th century English priest.

Marshe was educated at Magdalen College, Oxford. He held livings at Turweston, Bugbrooke, Little Greenford and the City of London (St Bride's, Fleet Street). He was Archdeacon of Lincoln from 1554 until his death in 1558.
