= George Reynolds (priest) =

George Reynolds was an Anglican priest, son of the Bishop of Lincoln, who served as Rector of Little Paxton and Archdeacon of Lincoln from 1725 to 1769. He authored a Historical Essay on the Government of the Church of England.

Church of England titles
Preceded by John Mandeville	Archdeacon of Lincoln; 1725–1769	Succeeded by John Gordon
