= Daniel Mills (biologist) =

English veterinarian and biologist (born 1966)

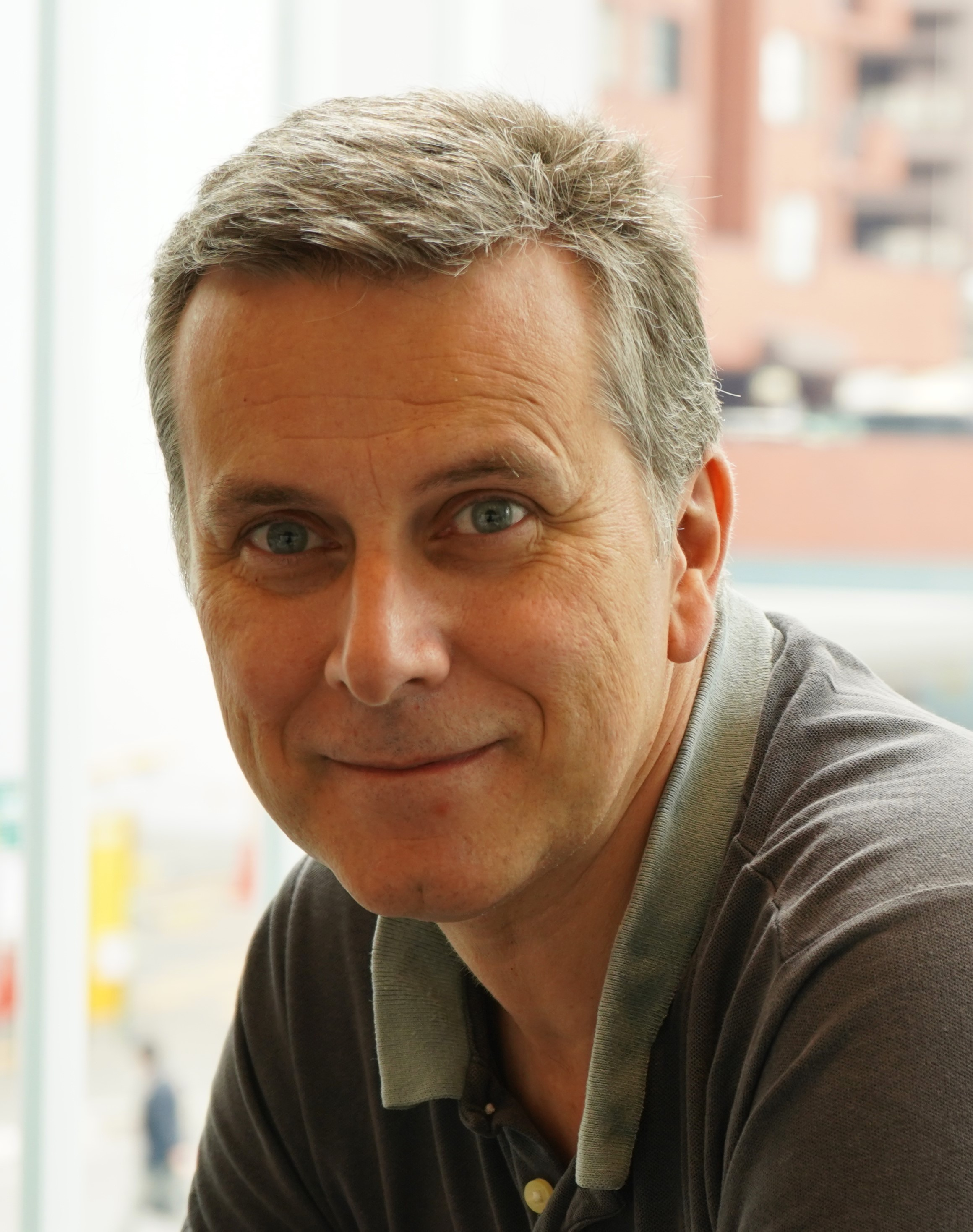
Professor D S Mills

Daniel Simon Mills, FRCVS (born 21 August 1966) is an English veterinarian and biologist and the UK's first Professor of Veterinary Behavioural Medicine based at the University of Lincoln, United Kingdom. He attended St Edmund's College, Ware before studying at the University of Bristol where he received his BVSc degree and completed his PhD degree in animal behaviour from De Montfort University.

== Biography ==
After some time spent in general practice, he became a Lecturer, Senior Lecturer and Principal Lecturer in animal behaviour at De Montfort University, and subsequently the University of Lincoln, where he has been Head of the Department of Biological Sciences, and now heads up the clinical animal behaviour team. He has an active teaching and research portfolio. His research has focused on the assessment of emotion in companion animals and the use of semiochemicals to manage their problem behaviour (pheromonatherapy). He has led the development of what has become known as the psychobiological approach to animal behaviour assessment, and has published more than 200 full scientific papers, books and chapters.

Among his achievements are becoming the first person within the UK to be recognised as a specialist in veterinary behavioural medicine by the Royal College of Veterinary Surgeons. and being awarded Fellowship of the Royal College of Veterinary Surgeons in 2016 in recognition of his contribution to the field. In 2020 he was also listed in the top 2% of scientists in the world and in 2021 was in the top 1% of cited scientists. The psychobiological approach to animal behaviour assessment, which he has pioneered, provides a scientific framework for making inferences about motivational and emotional state in animals. His recognised practical achievements include the development of the Lincoln stable mirror to assist horses with isolation problems and validation of the use of animal pheromones to influence unwanted behaviour; he has also developed a series of freely available, validated, psychometric instruments for assessment of emotional predisposition in dogs. He has appeared on several scientific and popular television programmes, such as the Horizon (BBC TV series) programme: the Secret Life of the Dog and Bang Goes the Theory. Since 2020, he has run an occasional podcast series "What makes you click?", in which he chats with colleagues from the field of clinical animal behaviour and welfare.

== Selected works ==
- The Domestic Horse: The Origins, Development and Management of its Behaviour, with Sue. M. McDonnell (2005)
- BSAVA Manual of Canine and Feline Behavioural Medicine, with Debra.F. Horwitz (2009)
- The Encyclopedia of Applied Animal Behaviour and Welfare, with Jeremy Marchant Forde, Paul McGreevy, David Morton, Christine Nicol, Clive Phillips, Peter Sandoe and Ronald Swaisgood (2010)
- Stress and Pheromonatherapy with Helen Zulch and Maya Dube (2013)
- Dog Bites: A Multidisciplinary Perspective, with Carri Westgarth (2017)
