= Riseholme College =

Agricultural school in Riseholme, England

Coordinates: 53.2686°N 0.5257°W

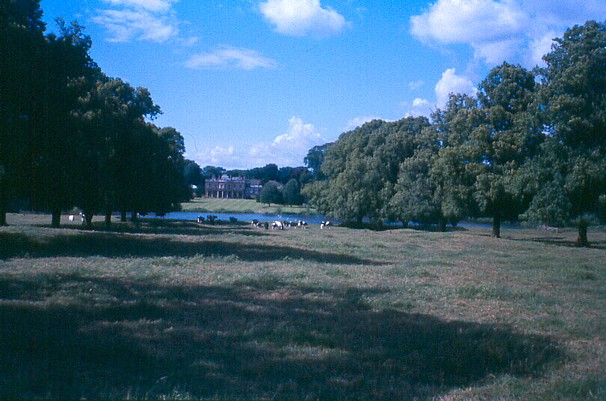
- Type: Further and higher education agricultural science college
- Established: 1949
- Administrative staff: 127
- Students: 757
- Undergraduates: 750
- Postgraduates: 7
- Location: Riseholme, United Kingdom
- Campus: Riseholme Park and Hollbeach
- Website: https://www.riseholme.ac.uk/

Riseholme College is a Further and Higher Education college in Lincolnshire, specialising in land-based subjects such as Agriculture, Equine and Animal Management.

It is a part of Bishop Burton College and is based across two campuses - the Riseholme Park campus and the Showground campus, both near Lincoln.

It was known as the Lincolnshire College of Agriculture and Horticulture alongside its sister site of Caythorpe Court near Grantham, before being renamed in 2007. After which the two site were merged and Caythorpe was closed.

== History ==
The school began life as Riseholme Farm Institute in 1949, becoming, in 1966, the Lindsey College of Agriculture. In 1980, the Lindsey college merged with its counterparts in the parts of Holland and Kesteven, and the combined county-wide college of agriculture was taken over by De Montfort University in 1994, before transferring to the University of Lincoln in 2001. It has been a part of Bishop Burton College since 2012.

== About ==
The college is a specialist land-based college, with courses including Agriculture, Animal Management, Equine and Land-based Engineering. With the opening of the Showground campus in September 2015, the college began to offer degree courses, as well as subjects such as Sport, Health and Social Care, Business and Public Services.

=== Showground Campus ===
Opened in September 2015, the Showground campus houses flexible teaching spaces, a modern Learning Resource Centre, a canteen, three engineering workshops and an industry standard Animal Management Unit, which is home to more than 100 animals.

The second phase of the campus, opened in September 2016, includes the Agri-Tech Health and Nutrition Centre, incorporating specialist laboratories and food science facilities, and the Sports and Health Science Centre, which includes a fully equipped fitness suite, Olympic-standard mixed use sports hall and flood-lit, all-weather pitch.

=== Riseholme Park Campus ===
Riseholme Park is situated in rural countryside just a few miles from Lincoln city centre and is home to the University of Lincoln.

Riseholme College equine facilities are based at Riseholme Park, but most facilities are at the College Lincolnshire Showground campus.

The picturesque Old Hall, positioned in front of the lake and completed in 1744 could be described as the landmark of the 200 hectare grounds of both broadleaf woodland and agricultural land. It is a grade II listed building, and the grounds are separately grade II listed.

==== The Equine Unit ====
The Equine Unit was opened in 2002 and its facilities include two indoor American barns housing up to 30 horses, two outdoor arenas, an indoor arena, horse walker, AI facilities, and a DIY yard for students which has now closed. The campus also had a successful Cleveland Bay breeding programme, their main stallion being their own home bred Lindon Principle whom two of the Queens mares have been put in foal to.

== See also ==
- Holbeach Technology Park
