= Pulter Forester =

Pulter Forester (23 November 1720 – 20 July 1778) was an Anglican priest in the eighteenth century, the Archdeacon of Buckingham from 1769 until 1778.

== Biography ==
Forester was the son of Pulter Forester and his wife, Agnes Harvey. Educated at Peterhouse, Cambridge, he was ordained in 1742, His first post was as Chaplain to Charles Maynard, 1st Viscount Maynard. After that he held incumbencies at Knapwell, Passenham Gayhurst, Skinnand and Cosgrave.

Church of England titles
Preceded by John Gordon	Archdeacon of Buckingham; 1769–1778	Succeeded by Luke Heslop
