= Arthur Hawes (priest) =

English priest (born 1943)

Arthur John Hawes (born 31 August 1943) is an Anglican priest who served as Archdeacon of Lincoln from 1995 to 2008.

He was educated at City of Oxford High School for Boys, the University of East Anglia (BA, 1986), the University of Birmingham, and Chichester Theological College.

Hawes was ordained in 1969. After a curacy in Kidderminster he was Priest in charge at Droitwich then Rector of Alderford. He was the TeamRector of Gaywood from 1992 until his appointment as Archdeacon.

In 2016, he was awarded the Langton Award for Community Service by the Archbishop of Canterbury "for his contribution to the ministry of the Church of England, particularly in the area of mental health".

Church of England titles
Preceded by Michael Palmer Brackenbury	Archdeacon of Lincoln; 1995–2008	Succeeded by Tim Barker
