= George Pelham (bishop) =

Bishop of Bristol

The Right Reverend and Honourable George Pelham
- Bishop of Lincoln
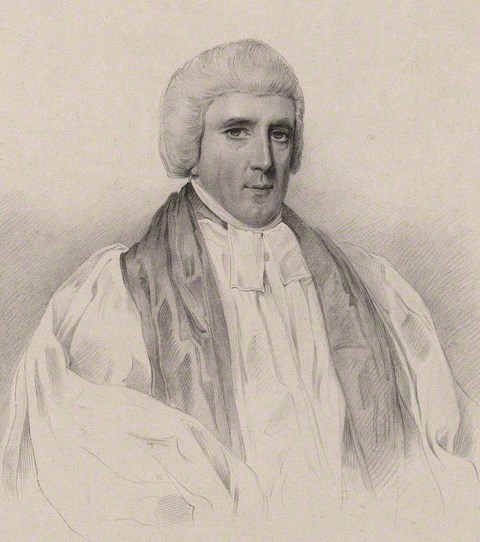
- Diocese: Diocese of Lincoln
- In office: 1820–1827
- Predecessor: George Pretyman
- Successor: John Kaye
- Other posts: Bishop of Bristol (1802–1807); Bishop of Exeter (1807–1820)

Personal details
- Born: 13 October 1766
- Died: 7 February 1827 (aged 60)
- Denomination: Anglican
- Education: Westminster School
- Alma mater: Clare College, Cambridge

George Pelham (13 October 1766 – 7 February 1827) was a Church of England bishop, serving in the sees of Bristol (1802–1807), Exeter (1807–1820) and Lincoln (1820–1827). He began his career as Vicar of Hellingly in Sussex in 1800.

George Pelham was the third (and youngest) son of Thomas Pelham, 1st Earl of Chichester and his wife Anne Frankland.

He was educated at Westminster and Clare College, Cambridge, graduating in 1787. He also served from 1815 to 1827 as Clerk of the Closet.

His monument, by Edward Hodges Baily, stands on Buckden.

== Family ==
He married Mary Rycroft, daughter of Sir Richard Rycroft, 1st Baronet and Penelope Stonehewer. they had no children.

== Arms ==
Coat of arms of George Pelham
Escutcheon Azure, three pelicans in piety argent; quartering, Gules, two demi-belts paleways, buckles towards chief, argent.

Church of England titles
Preceded by Folliott Cornewall	Bishop of Bristol; 1802–1807	Succeeded by John Luxmoore
Preceded by John Fisher	Bishop of Exeter; 1807–1820	Succeeded by William Carey
Preceded by George Pretyman	Bishop of Lincoln; 1820–1827	Succeeded by John Kaye
Court offices
Preceded by Robert James Carr	Clerk of the Closet; 1815–1827	Succeeded by William Jackson
