= George Jeudwine =

George Wynne Jeudwine (12 April 1849 – 18 October 1933) was an eminent Anglican priest in the first third of the twentieth century.

Jeudwine was born in Kensington, the son of barrister George Jeudwine. He was educated at Bradfield College and Corpus Christi College, Oxford. He was elected a Fellow of The Queen's College, Oxford in 1870; and ordained in 1872. He was Vicar of Upton Grey from 1875 to 1884; and then Rector of Niton from then until 1889. He was Rector of Harlaxton from 1889 to 1913 (and Archdeacon of Stow from 1912 to 1913). He was Archdeacon of Lincoln from 1913 to 1925; and Sub-Dean of Lincoln Cathedral from then until his death.

Church of England titles
Preceded by John Bond	Archdeacon of Stow; 1912–1913	Succeeded by John Wakeford
Preceded by William Frederick John Kaye	Archdeacon of Lincoln; 1913–1925	Succeeded by John Edward Hine
