= Riseholme Hall =

Country house in Lincolnshire, England

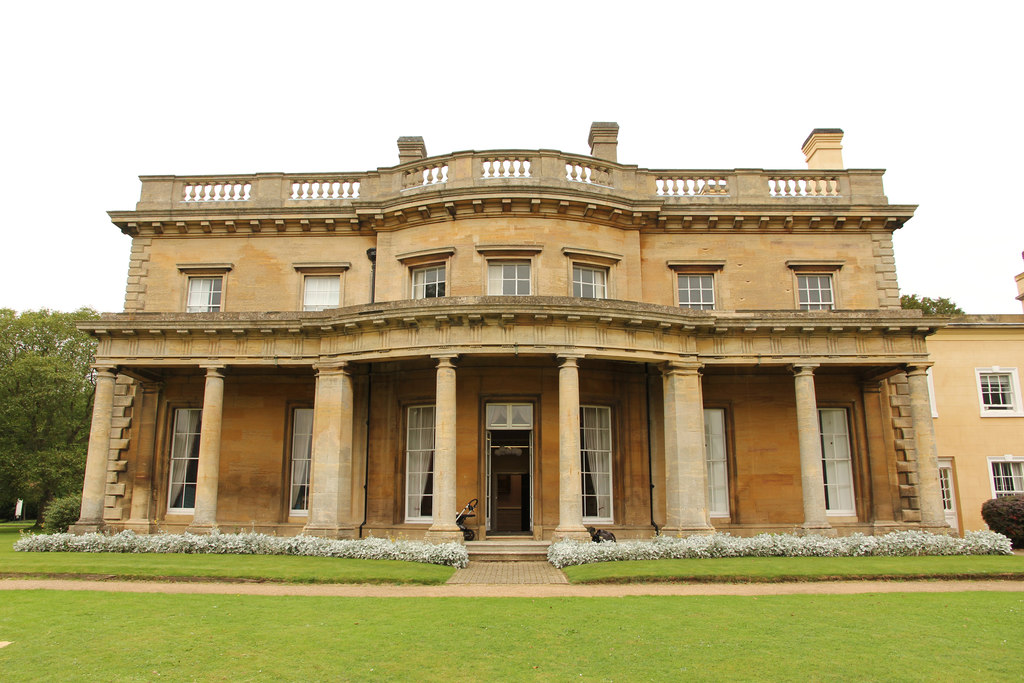

General information
- Location: England
- Coordinates: 53.2685°N 0.5298°W

Design and construction
- Architect: William Railton
- Developer: Francis Chaplin

Riseholme Hall is an early 18th-century country house in Riseholme, West Lindsey, Lincolnshire, England. It was designed by William Railton and is a grade II listed building

From about 1840 until 1887, it served as the official residence for the Bishop of Lincoln, and subsequently was privately owned. After World War II, the building was occupied by the Lindsey College of Agriculture, now known as Riseholme College, part of Bishop Burton College.

Riseholme Park and Riseholme Hall have been owned by the University of Lincoln since 1994. Riseholme College is independent of the University of Lincoln, although the college shares some facilities on the estate.

It was the birthplace of English travel writer, novelist and explorer, Rosita Forbes, née Joan Rosita Torr (16 January 1890 – 30 June 1967).

The grounds of the hall are also grade II listed.
