= Lincoln Performing Arts Centre =

446-seat multi-purpose auditorium

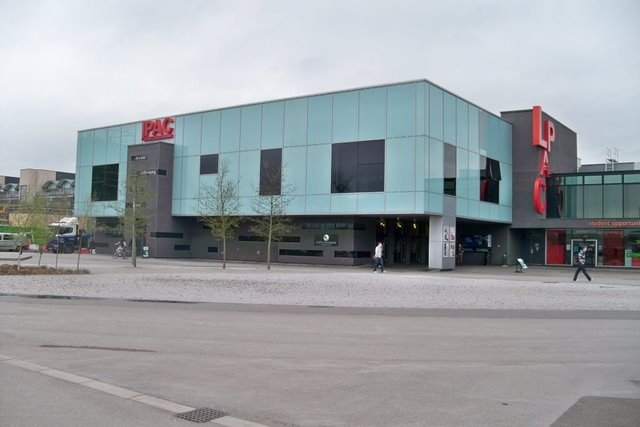
- A view of LPAC

- Location within Lincolnshire
- Alternative names: LPAC

General information
- Type: Theatre
- Architectural style: Opaque glass facade with tinted glass openings
- Location: University of Lincoln Brayford campus, Lincoln, LN6 7TS
- Coordinates: 53.229°N 0.5495°W
- Elevation: 10 m (33 ft)
- Completed: December 2007
- Inaugurated: 20 January 2008
- Cost: £5.9 million
- Client: University of Lincoln
- Landlord: University of Lincoln

Technical details
- Floor area: 2,500 sq metres

Design and construction
- Architecture firm: Stem Architects
- Structural engineer: Ward Cole
- Services engineer: LTA Woodworks

The Lincoln Performing Arts Centre (LPAC) is a 446-seat multi-purpose auditorium, designed for live arts performances, conferences, and film screenings, in Lincoln, Lincolnshire, England, and part of the University of Lincoln.

== History ==
In 1985 a report on the arts in Lincoln, for the City of Lincoln Recreation, Leisure and Tourism Committee, was called 'A Downhill Struggle' written by Patrick Masefield, which recommended building an arts centre with a 1800-seat performance hall.

It opened on 20 January 2008, with a recital by the cellist Steven Isserlis. The theatre's programme of events is designed to complement, rather than compete with, those of its neighbouring venues, such as the Theatre Royal, Lincoln.

The Just a Minute radio programme was recorded at the venue on 26 January 2009.

=== Funding ===
The building has been funded by the University of Lincoln, Lincolnshire County Council (including This is Art), the City of Lincoln Council, Lincolnshire Enterprise (£1.8 million), the East Midlands Development Agency, and Arts Council England.

== Construction ==
=== Design ===
The consulting engineers were Ward Cole, who are situated off Carholme Road (A57). They also worked on the University's School of Architecture and library, the Engine Shed, the student accommodation next to the Foss Dyke, Lincoln Nuffield Hospital, Witham Wharf (on the Brayford), and the city's Odeon cinema.

The architects were Stem Architects, based in Sparkhouse Studios on the campus, who have designed the majority of the University's buildings, including the new Enterprise @ Lincoln building.

=== Equipment ===
The building consists of the theatre and the new Centre for Innovation in Performing Arts, a base for undergraduate and postgraduate students, with LSPA.

The centre piece of the new building is a 446-seat theatre which will host professional touring theatre, music and dance productions plus film screenings by students from the Lincoln School of Performing Arts.

=== Facilities ===
It has the Zing Café open from 9am to 5pm during term time, and for night-time events there is the Theatre Bar. There is a Box Office in the Tower Bar Foyer in the Engine Shed open from 10am to 4pm.

== Ancillary functions ==
LPAC also offers educational and outreach arts work with local communities. The £5.9 million centre is also home to the Lincoln School of Performing Arts (LSPA) where around 240 students study for both undergraduate and postgraduate degrees in drama and dance. Arranged around the theatre are studios for dance, drama and music, as well as office spaces and control and dimming rooms designed specifically to enable instruction of students during live performance.

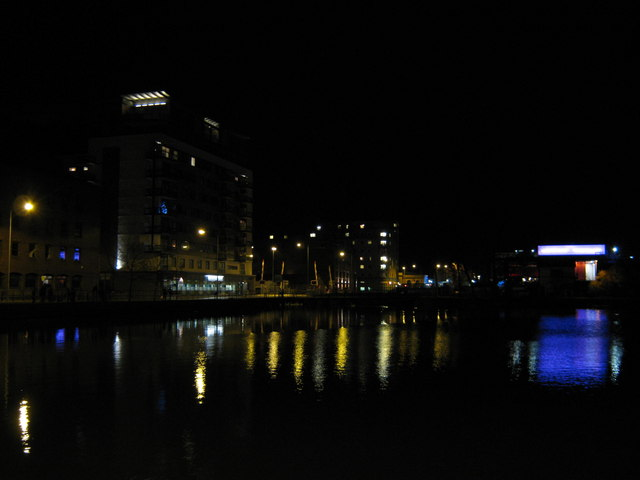
Brayford Pool by night
