= Training Quality Standard =

UK educational quality standard

The Training Quality Standard was a standard given by the United Kingdom government to training providers whose provision was assessed as being of high quality. It was launched in 2008, and was wound down in 2011 after the Department for Business, Innovation & Skills withdrew funding for the programme.
