= Archdeacon of Lincoln =

Ecclesiastical officer of Lincoln diocese

The Archdeacon of Lincoln is a senior ecclesiastical officer in the Diocese of Lincoln – they have responsibilities within their archdeaconry (the ancient Archdeaconry of Lincoln) including oversight of church buildings and some supervision, discipline and pastoral care of the clergy.

== History ==
The archdeaconry has existed since the 11th century, when archdeacons were first appointed across England, and has remained in the Diocese of Lincoln since. Since ancient times, the territory of the archdeaconry covered all of Lincolnshire (barring the West Riding of Lindsey, the Stow archdeaconry); that territory has remained broadly similar throughout her thousand-year history.

== List of archdeacons ==
=== High Medieval ===
- bef. 1092–?: Richard (first archdeacon)
- c.1100 Albertus Longobardus (the Lombard)
- c. 1106–?: Nicholas
- c.1117 William Bajocensis
- ?–?1129 Roger de Clinton (afterwards Bishop of Lichfield, 1129)
- bef. 1132–?: William of Bayeux
- bef. 1145–aft. 1169: Robert
- c. 1160: Richard D'Aumery
- c. 1140–1170: Robert de Chesney
- bef. 1171–bef. 1175 (res.): Geoffrey Plantagenet (afterwards Bishop of Lincoln, 1173)
- aft. 1175–aft. 1215 (rem.): Peter (half-brother of Geoffrey)
- bef. 1219–1223 (res.): William de Thornaco (afterwards Dean of Lincoln, 1223)
- 1223–1238 (d.): Robert of Hailes
- 1238–1248 (res.): Thomas Wallensis (afterwards Bishop of St Davids, 1248)
- 1248–1255 (deprived): William Lupus (Le Loup)
- c. 1255–aft. 1277 (d.): Roger de Fuldon
- bef. 1277–12 December 1290 (d.): William de la Gare
- bef. 1291–30 May 1319 (exch.): William de Estiniaco (d'Estaing)

=== Late Medieval ===
- 30 May 1319 – 1323 (res.): John de Stratford (afterwards Bishop of Winchester, 1324)
- 1323–c. 1 March 1330 (res.): Archibald de Périgord (bishop's/papal grant)
- 22 July 1323 – 25 October 1330 (rev.): John Erdeleye (royal grant; revoked)
- 24 July 1323: Robert Baldock (unsuccessful royal grant)
- 6 February 1327 – 1331 (d.): Hugh de Camera (royal grant; papal grant in 1330)
- 26 May 1331 – 1349 (d.): Thomas Northwood/Northwode
- 1349: John de Offord
- 1352: William Askeby/Scoter (unsuccessful papal reservation)
- 8 May 1354 – 1355 (res.): Hugues Auberti (Hugh Aubert)
- 18 February 1355 – 10 May 1363 (d.): Audoen Cardinal Aubert (Cardinal priest of Santi Giovanni e Paolo)
- 23 May 1363 – 1367 (res.): William of Wykeham (afterwards Bishop of Winchester 1367)
- bef. 1369–1386 (d.): Richard de Ravenser
- 5 June 1386–bef. 1390 (d.): Nicholas Chaddesden (claimant)
- 23 March 1387–September 1401 (res.): Henry Bowet (afterwards Bishop of Wells, 1401)
- bef. 1391–4 March 1391 (rem.): John Thomas
- 1 April 1399: William Feriby (royal grant)
- 23 April 1399: Richard Maudeleyn (collated by bishop)
- 27 September 1401 – 1403 (d.): John Scarle
- 25 April 1403 – 1405 (d.): Thomas Bekingham
- 6 February 1405 – 1431 (d.): Henry Wells
- 22 September 1407: Anthonio Correr (unsuccessful claimant)
- 23 October 1431 – 1458 (d.): Richard Cawdrey/Caudray
- 1458–1463 (d.): Richard Ewen
- 27 April 1464 – 1471 (d.): John Chadworth
- 6 August 1471–bef. 1481 (d.): John Rudying
- 5 November 1481 – 1494 (d.): John Coke
- 28 July 1494 – 1506 (d.): Thomas Hutton
- 21 August 1506 – 1528 (d.): William Smith
- 22 June 1528 – 1542 (att.): Richard Pate (later Bishop of Worcester, 1554)

=== Early modern ===
- 8 April 1542 – 1549 (d.): George Heneage (previously Dean of Lincoln, 1528–38)
- 22 September 1549 – 1554 (deprived): Nicholas Bullingham (deprived)
- 23 May 1554–December 1558 (d.): Thomas Marshall
- 27 December 1558 – 15 January 1559 (deprived): Gawin/Owen Hodgson (deprived)
- 15 January 1559 – 1562: Nicholas Bullingham (restored; also Bishop of Lincoln from 1560)
- 6 November 1562 – 1577 (res.): John Aylmer (afterwards Bishop of London, 1577)
- 25 June 1577 – 1580 (res.): William Cole (later Dean of Lincoln, 1598)
- 1 April 1581 – 1595 (d.): John Barefoot
- 27 August 1595 – 1612 (d.): Richard Clayton (also Dean of Peterborough, 1590–1612)
- 11 September 1612 – 1626 (d.): John Hills
- 25 November 1626 – 1644 (d.): Morgan Wynne
- 20 August 1645 – 2 February 1667 (d.): Raphael Throckmorton (not installed until the Restoration, 1660)
- 27 February 1667 – 13 August 1709 (d.): John Cawley
- 26 August 1687: Thomas Oldys (unsuccessful counter-claimant)
- 22 October 1709 – 21 January 1725 (d.): John Mandeville (also Dean of Peterborough, 1722–25)
- 19 July 1725 – 6 June 1769 (d.): George Reynolds
- 1 July 1769 – 4 January 1793 (d.): John Gordon
- 13 September 1793 – 5 June 1817 (d.): John Pretyman
- 11 June 1817 – 8 February 1845 (res.): Charles Goddard
- 22 February 1845 – 24 December 1862 (d.): Henry Bonney

=== Late modern ===
- 1863 – 9 June 1913 (d.): William Kaye
- 1913–1925 (res.): George Jeudwine
- 1925–1933 (ret.): John Hine (also Bishop suffragan of Grantham until 1930; Assistant Bishop after 1930)
- 1933–1937 (res.): Hubert Larken
- 1938–1947 (res.): Kenneth Warner
- 1947–1951 (res.): Kenneth Lamplugh
- 1951–1958 (res.): Kenneth Healey
- 1960–1976 (ret.): Arthur Smith (afterwards archdeacon emeritus)
- 1977–1983 (res.): Michael Adie
- 1983–1988 (res.): Ronald Milner
- 1988–1995 (ret.): Michael Brackenbury (afterwards archdeacon emeritus)
- 1995–2008 (ret.): Arthur Hawes (afterwards archdeacon emeritus)
- September 2009 – November 2015 (res.): Tim Barker
- 27 November 2015 – 27 March 2016 (Acting): Geoffrey Arrand, Archdeacon emeritus of Suffolk
- 27 March 2016–priest: Gavin Kirk

== Sources ==
- Greenway, Diana E. (1977), Fasti Ecclesiae Anglicanae 1066–1300, vol. 3, pp. 24–26
- King, H.P.F. (1962), Fasti Ecclesiae Anglicanae 1300–1541, vol. 1, pp. 6–8
- Horn, Joyce M.; Smith, David M. (1999), Fasti Ecclesiae Anglicanae 1541–1857, vol. 9, pp. 9–11
