= National Centre for Food Manufacturing =

United Kingdom academic institution

Coordinates: 52.8099°N 0.017°E

- Website: https://www.lincoln.ac.uk/home/holbeach/

The National Centre for Food Manufacturing (NCFM) is the food science campus of the University of Lincoln, situated on Park Road at Holbeach in the south of the county of Lincolnshire. It offers part-time apprenticeships and distance learning degrees for individuals working in the food industry.

== Apprenticeships, Degree and Foundation Courses ==
The National Centre for Food Manufacturing offers part time distance learning options to achieve Foundation and BSc (Honours) Food Manufacture degrees and higher degrees through research together with all levels of apprenticeships including Higher Apprenticeships (which includes a Foundation Degree). The Foundation and Undergraduate degrees cover areas including Food and Drink Operations and Manufacturing Management - Food Science and Technology – and Food Supply Chain Management. The Centre also offers part time Masters and PhDs - often progressed by food sector employees and focused on specific Food Manufacturing Industry Challenges.

The Higher and Degree Apprenticeships include the CMDA (Chartered Manager Degree Apprenticeship), Departmental Manager, Laboratory Scientist and Professional Technical degrees.

The Centre provides support to apprentices for Functional Skills development in maths and English as required by their relevant apprenticeship standard and offers employers a complete skills development programme for its employees.

NCFM has apprenticeship partnerships with 250 UK food businesses including Addo Food Group, Bakkavor, Bidfood, Dalehead Foods, Summers Butchery Services, Greencore Group, Tulip, Dovecote Park, Fresttime, Finlays, JDM Food Group, Kerry, Nestle, Worldwide Fruit, University Academy Holbeach, Produce World Group, J.O. Sims Ltd, Greenvale AP, FreshLinc, Ripe Now and Lincolnshire Field Products.

== Research ==
NCFM advances food manufacturing and related food supply chain research initiatives via a wide range of industry and academic partnerships. The areas of core research include Robotics and Automation, Food Analysis (Microbiology & Food Chemistry), Advanced Food Processing Technologies, Food Insights & Sustainability, and Food Supply Chain Development.

The NCFM Research and Technical Resources coupled with industry and academic partnerships enable NCFM to readily progress multidisciplinary research and practical problem solving for the food industry. NCFM’s research agenda reflects the food sector’s innovation priorities and is informed by funding partners and directly by the needs of the diverse food sector including retailers and food businesses of all sizes from multinationals to SME and micro businesses. Research at NCFM is funded by a number of sources (dependent upon the specific challenge) including direct consultancy with business, Innovate UK, BBSRC, EPSRC, FSA, EU Interreg programmes and Horizon 2020 initiatives.

== Short Courses ==
NCFM offers Short Courses including courses in auditing, food safety, Hazard analysis and critical control points(HACCP), health and safety, management and team development, and technical and product development.

== Commercial Partners ==
The National Centre for Food Manufacturing maintains commercial partnerships with food industry organisations specialising in areas such as robotics, refrigeration, sustainability, packaging, manufacturing, innovative food supply chain management, food processing, productivity and several other areas.

== Conferencing Facilities ==
‌The National Centre for Food Manufacturing Holbeach campus offers facilities hire for conferences, seminars and exhibitions.
