= South Ormsby =

Village in the East Lindsey district of Lincolnshire, England

Coordinates: 53.261365°N 0.051890°E

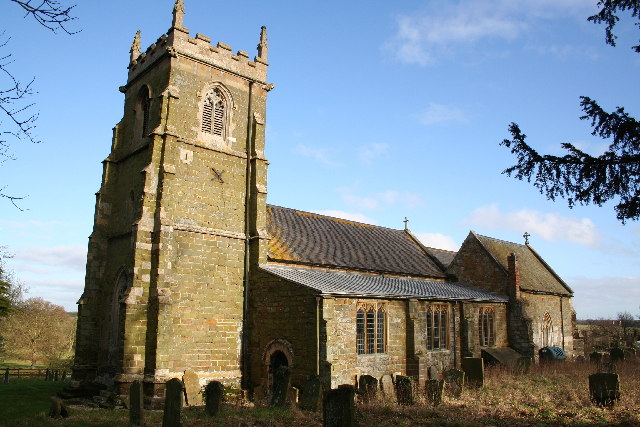
- St Leonard's Church, South Ormsby

- Location within Lincolnshire
- OS grid reference: TF369757
  - London: 125 mi (201 km) S
- District: East Lindsey
- Shire county: Lincolnshire
- Region: East Midlands
- Country: England
- Sovereign state: United Kingdom
- Post town: Louth
- Postcode district: LN11
- Police: Lincolnshire
- Fire: Lincolnshire
- Ambulance: East Midlands
- UK Parliament: Louth and Horncastle

South Ormsby, sometimes called South Ormesby, is a village in the East Lindsey district of Lincolnshire, England. It is situated 1 mile (1.6 km) west from the A16 road, 7 miles (11 km) south from Louth and 7 miles north-east from Horncastle. With the nearby hamlet of Ketsby, it forms the civil parish of South Ormesby with Ketsby. The population is included in the civil parish of Brinkhill.

The 15th-century church of St Leonard's is approached by a short climb up a path next to the old school house.

Ormsby Hall, built by James Paine in 1752, stands in a wooded parkland complete with lake.

The village has a public house, the Massingberd Arms, and a motor repair garage.

The Greenwich Prime Meridian line passes through the village.
