= Brinkhill =

Village and civil parish in the East Lindsey district of Lincolnshire, England

Coordinates: 53.241952°N 0.054728°E

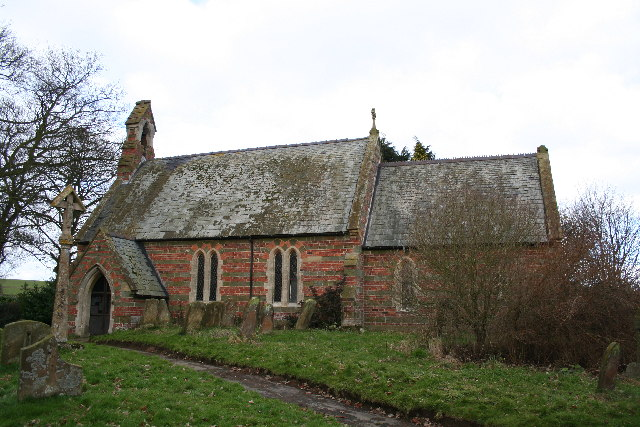
- St Philip's Church, Brinkhill

- Location within Lincolnshire
- Population: 172 (Including Ketsby and South Ormsby. 2011)
- OS grid reference: TF372736
  - London: 120 mi (190 km) S
- District: East Lindsey
- Shire county: Lincolnshire
- Region: East Midlands
- Country: England
- Sovereign state: United Kingdom
- Post town: Louth
- Postcode district: LN11
- Police: Lincolnshire
- Fire: Lincolnshire
- Ambulance: East Midlands
- UK Parliament: Louth and Horncastle

Brinkhill is a village and civil parish in the East Lindsey district of Lincolnshire, England. It is situated approximately 5 miles (8 km) west from the market town of Alford and 7 miles (11 km) north-west from Spilsby, The village lies in the Lincolnshire Wolds, a designated Area of Outstanding Natural Beauty.

The village is listed in 1086 Domesday Book as "Brincle", with 26 households which was then considered quite large. The Lord of the manor was Earl Hugh of Chester.

The parish church is dedicated to Saint Philip and is a Grade II listed building dating from 1857, built of red brick by Maugham and Fowler. In the churchyard stands an ancient scheduled and Grade II* listed churchyard cross, the base of which dates from the 14th century, with a 19th-century alteration.

The Greenwich Prime Zero meridian line passes through the village.
