= Lincolnshire Showground =

Event centre in Lincoln, England

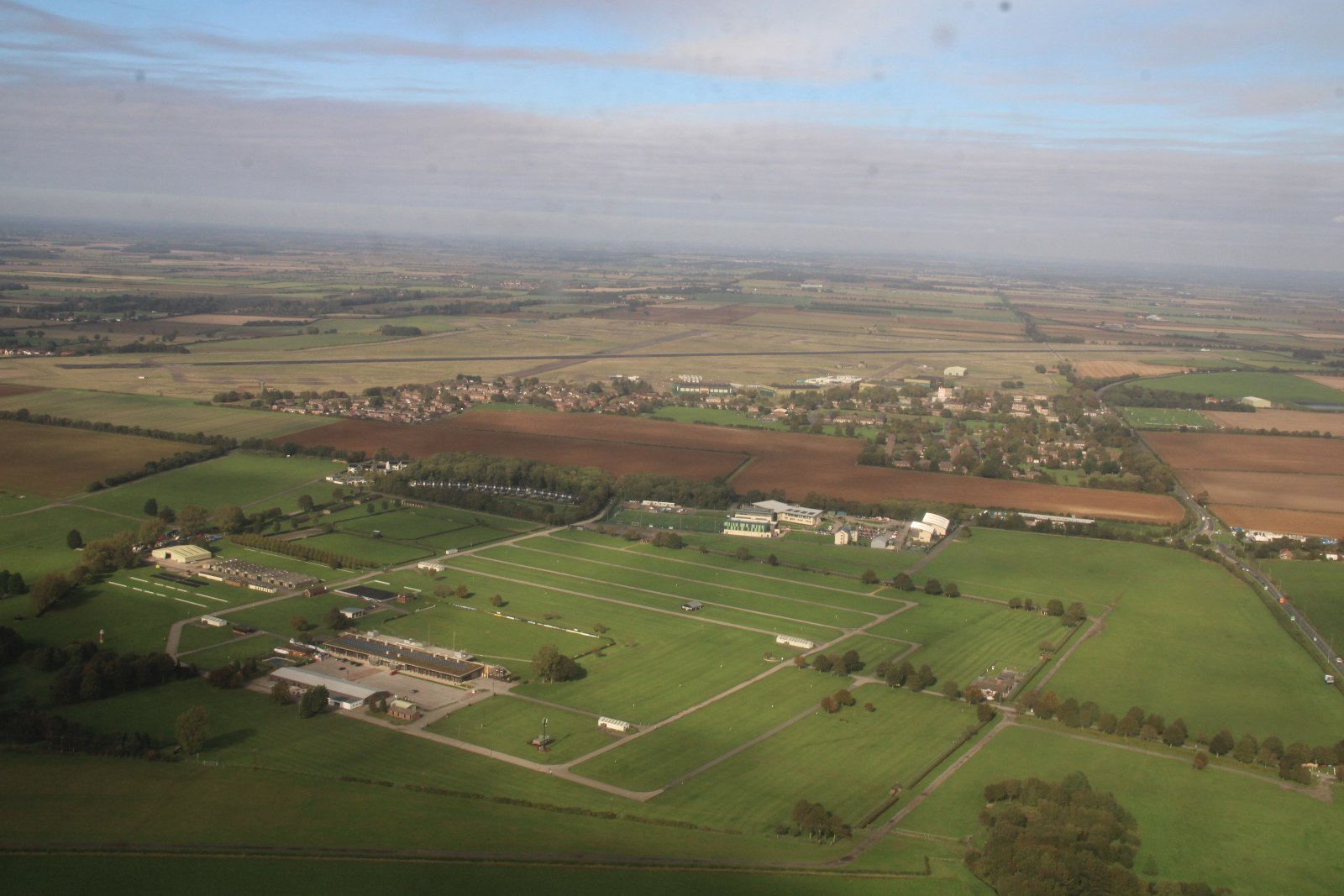
- A view of Lincolnshire Showground
- Interactive map of Lincolnshire Showground
- Address: LN2 2NA; Lincoln; England
- Coordinates: 53.287°N 0.548°W

The Lincolnshire Showground is an agricultural showground and exhibition centre built in 1959 in North Carlton, north of Lincoln in England. It is the chief exhibition centre of the Lincolnshire Agricultural Society, and has been used for large events such as LincsFest, the Lincolnshire Farming Conference, Poacher International Jamboree for scouts and guides, and as a vaccination centre during the COVID-19 crisis in England.

The venue incorporates the EPIC exhibition centre and a woodland.
