= Riseholme =

Village and civil parish in Lincolnshire, England

Coordinates: 53.264933°N 0.531231°W

- Village and civil parish
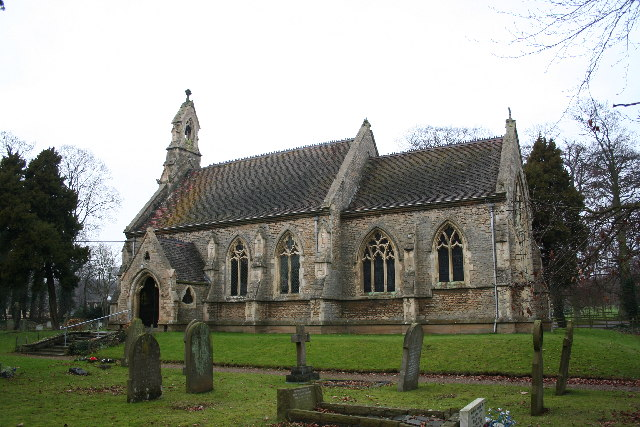
- St Mary's Church, Riseholme

- Location within Lincolnshire
- Population: 450 (2011)
- OS grid reference: SK980752
  - London: 120 mi (190 km) S
- District: West Lindsey
- Shire county: Lincolnshire
- Region: East Midlands
- Country: England
- Sovereign state: United Kingdom
- Post town: Lincoln
- Postcode district: LN2
- Dialling code: 01522
- Police: Lincolnshire
- Fire: Lincolnshire
- Ambulance: East Midlands
- UK Parliament: Gainsborough

Riseholme is a village and civil parish in the West Lindsey district of Lincolnshire, England. The population of the civil parish was 450 at the 2011 census. It is situated approximately 1 mile (1.6 km) north from Lincoln.

== Riseholme Park ==
Riseholme Hall, an 18th-century country house, stands in the Riseholme Park estate. This belonged to the Chaplin family until the death of Rev Robert Chaplin in 1837, after which it was put up for sale. Between 1840 and 1880 the house served as the Episcopal Palace for the Bishops of Lincoln. In 1851, the Church of St Mary was built by Bishop John Kaye to replace a ruined medieval church. Bishop Kaye lies buried in the churchyard there, along with his successor, Bishop Christopher Wordsworth.

Today, Riseholme Park is the site of the rural science campus of the University of Lincoln (often referred to as Riseholme Park), and the home of Riseholme College, the University of Lincoln's main Further Education department. Riseholme Park campus covers more than 1,000 acres (4.0 km^{2}) of land, and includes woodland, deer parks, and a lake. The college provides courses in small animals, forestry and arboriculture, equine (horses), horticulture and agriculture.

In 1994 Princess Anne opened a new residential training college for the Inland Revenue (HM Revenue and Customs), Lawress Hall, at Riseholme Park. The college has two farms, one on the main site at Riseholme, and one in the nearby village of Nettleham (Lodge Farm, Nettleham). Facilities include an AstroTurf pitch, rugby and football pitches, fishing, halls for corporate events and outdoor activities.

== See also ==
- Riseholme Hall
