= Dean of Guernsey =

The Dean of Guernsey is the leader of the Church of England in Guernsey, Alderney, and Sark. The dean fulfils the role of Archdeacon, rural Dean, and Bishop's commissary for the Deanery of Guernsey. In Guernsey, the Church of England is the Established Church, although the Dean is not a member of the States of Guernsey.

The Deanery of Guernsey was officially part of the Diocese of Winchester since 1568. This meant that the British Channel Island of Guernsey was under the legal jurisdiction of the Bishop of Winchester and was responsible for its episcopal oversight up until March of the 2014. Due to a breakdown in the relationship between the Dean of Jersey and the Bishop of Winchester, the Bishop of Dover of the Diocese of Canterbury provided temporary episcopal oversight and legal responsibility of administrative affairs until 2018. The Archbishop of Canterbury's Commission reported later in 2019, in response to the future management of the Channel Islands' Deaneries, made a number of recommendations that aimed to strengthen the relationship between Bishop and Dean and Diocese and Deanery. One of these recommendations were that the Deaneries of Guernsey and Jersey should now be attached to the Diocese of Salisbury. In 2020, the General Synod approved the transfer, and on 15 November 2022 the Deanery of Guernsey was attached to the Diocese of Salisbury.

== List of deans ==
- c. 1566: John After
- 1662 to 1697: John Saumares
- 1892 to 1918: Thomas Bell
- 1918 to 1922: John Penfold
- 1922 to 1931: Douglas Carey
- 1931 to 1947: Agnew Giffard
- 1947 to 1967: Edward Frossard
- 1967 to 1978: Frederick Cogman
- 1978 to 1988: John Foster
- 1989 to 1995: Jeffrey Fenwick
- 1995 to 2003: Marc Trickey
- 2003 to 2014: Paul Mellor
- 2015 to present: Tim Barker

== See also ==
- Dean of Jersey
