= Marc Trickey =

British Anglican priest (1935–2023)

Frederick Marc Trickey (16 August 1935 – 2023) was an Anglican priest in the late 20th and early 21st centuries.

He was educated at Bristol Grammar School and Durham University and ordained in 1965. After a curacy at the Church of St Lawrence, Alton he was rector of St John with Winnall from 1968 to 1977. He was rector of St Martin de la Bellouse, Guernsey from 1977 to 2002, Dean of Guernsey from 1995 to 2003 and Priest in charge of Sark from 1996 to 2003.

Church of England titles
Preceded by Jeffery Robert Fenwick	Dean of Guernsey; 1995– 2003	Succeeded by Kenneth Paul Mellor
