= Tony Tremlett =

Tony Tremlett may refer to:

- Tony Tremlett (bishop) (1914–1992), bishop of Dover
- Tony Tremlett (archdeacon) (born 1937), Anglican priest and former archdeacon
