= Gavin Kirk =

Gavin Kirk may refer to:

- Gavin Kirk (ice hockey) (born 1951), ice hockey player
- Gavin Kirk (priest) (born 1961), British Anglican priest
