= Alfred Rose (bishop) =

British bishop

- Bishop of Dover
- Diocese: Diocese of Canterbury
- In office: 1935–1956
- Predecessor: John Macmillan
- Successor: Lewis Meredith
- Other posts: Vicar of Brighton (1928–1935); Assistant Bishop of Canterbury (1956–1971)

Orders
- Ordination: 1909
- Consecration: 1935 by Cosmo Gordon Lang

Personal details
- Born: Alfred Carey Wollaston Rose; 1884
- Died: 9 April 1971 (aged 86) Canterbury, Kent, United Kingdom
- Denomination: Anglican
- Parents: A. Rose (a vicar)
- Spouse: Lois née Garton
- Children: four sons, inc. Clive
- Education: Worcester College, Oxford

Alfred Carey Wollaston Rose (1884 – 9 April 1971) was the sixth Bishop of Dover, England, in the modern era, from 1935 to 1956.

== Life ==
The son of Arthur Wollaston Rose, Vicar of Wilstead, Bedfordshire, he was educated at Marlborough, and Worcester College, Oxford. He began his ministry with a curacy at St Mary, Somers Town, London (1909–1914); after which he served a period as a Royal Navy chaplain during World War I (1914–1919).

Rose was appointed chaplain on the day war was declared. He served on HMS London, a support ship for the Gallipoli campaign, on the troopship HMS Tyne and finally on the battleship HMS Marlborough. Just before his demobilisation in February 1919, Rose was recognised as "Excellent type of chaplain. Cheery with great influence."

When peace returned, he became Sub-Warden of the Bishop's Hostel, Lincoln (1919–1920) and then Warden (1921–1927), during which time he also served as Vicar of Haigh, Lancashire (1920–1921) and a prebendary of Lincoln Cathedral (1927–1928). He then became Vicar of St Peter's Church, Brighton and Rural Dean of the city, and examining chaplain to Winfrid Burrows and George Bell, Bishops of Chichester (1928–1935) and an Honorary Chaplain to the King (George VI; 1933–1935) before his ordination to the episcopate.

His appointment to become Bishop of Dover, a suffragan bishop in the Diocese of Canterbury, was announced on 16 November 1934 and he was consecrated a bishop by Cosmo Gordon Lang, Archbishop of Canterbury, at Canterbury Cathedral on the Feast of the Circumcision (1 January) 1935. After serving in that role for 21 years — working with four archbishops (Lang, Temple, Fisher, and Ramsey) and twice acting up as diocesan bishop — , he retired at the end of 1956, going first to briefly serve as chaplain (vicar) of Palermo, Sicily. Throughout his retirement, he continued to serve the Church as an Assistant Bishop within the Diocese of Canterbury and as a Sub-Prelate of the Order of St John of Jerusalem. He died, aged 86, in Canterbury on Good Friday, 9 April 1971.

Geoffrey Fisher, former Archbishop of Canterbury, paid tribute to him as a man who won the trust of people ‘...wherever he went by his personal graces, his intense interest in them and all that concerned them, his ready humour and engaging laughter, his well stocked mind, his unfailing spirit of personal integrity, of pastoral devotion and faith.’

== Family ==
Rose married Lois née Garton in 1920 and they had four sons, one of whom, Clive Rose, was a diplomat who served as Permanent Representative to the North Atlantic Council.

Church of England titles
| Preceded by John Macmillan | Bishop of Dover; 1935–1956 | Succeeded by Lewis Meredith |
