= Clive Rose (diplomat) =

British diplomat (1921–2019)

Sir Clive Martin Rose GCMG (15 September 1921 – 17 April 2019) was a British diplomat.

== Early life ==
Rose was the son of Alfred Rose, former Bishop of Dover and Lois Juliet. He was educated at Marlborough College and Christ Church, Oxford. In 1946 he married Elisabeth Mackenzie, daughter of Reverend Cyril Lewis, Gilston; they had two sons and three daughters.

== Military service ==
In 1942 Rose was commissioned as a Second Lieutenant in the Rifle Brigade. During his commission he served in Europe, was mentioned in dispatches for bravery and promoted to major.(1944-1945), later he served in India (1945) and Iraq (1945–46).

== Diplomat ==
His diplomatic career began when he joined the Commonwealth Relations Office in 1948, and was appointed to the Office of the Deputy High Commissioner, Madras (1948–49). Rose subsequently joined the Foreign Office, (1950–53); UK High Commission, Germany, (1953–54); British Embassy, Bonn, (1955).

In 1959 Rose was appointed Her Majesty's Consul for the Oriental Republic of the Uruguay based in Montevideo.

In 1976 Rose was head of the United Kingdom delegation to the negotiations on Mutual Reduction of Forces and Armaments and associated measures in Central Europe in Vienna.

In 1977 following a series of strikes Rose was seconded to the Cabinet Office to chair the Civil Contingencies Unit. He chaired this throughout the Winter of Discontent.

Rose served as Permanent Representative to the North Atlantic Council from 1979 to 1982.

Rose later became Chairman of the Council of the Royal United Services Institute for Defence Studies.

== Honours and awards ==
In the 1976 Birthday Honours Rose was appointed a Knight Commander of the Order of St Michael and St George. In the 1981 Birthday Honours Rose was promoted to Knight Grand Cross of the Order of St Michael and St George.

== Retirement ==
Rose retired in 1982, and resided in the medieval West Suffolk village of Lavenham. In his retirement he was an active member of the literary community. He wrote several books about his ancestral history, including: Alice Owen: The Life, Marriages and Times of a Tudor Lady. He was instrumental in starting the biannual Lavenham Literary Festival.
