= John Penfold (priest) =

John Brookes Vernon Penfold was an Anglican priest in the first half of the 20th century.

John Penfold was born into an ecclesiastical family in 1864: his father was the Rev. William Penfold, MA, Rector of Ruardean and Chaplain to the Duke of Beaufort. He was educated at St John's School, Leatherhead and Jesus College, Cambridge. Ordained in 1888 he began his career as Chaplain of King William's College, Isle of Man. After this he was Assistant Minister at St James’, Welbeck Street and then Vicar of St James’, Guernsey, 1893.

He was Dean of the island from 1918 until his death on 4 May 1922.

Penfold was also a prominent Freemason, Senior Grand Warden of the Province of Guernsey and Alderney, and Grand Chaplain of England.

Church of England titles
Preceded by Thomas Bell	Dean of Guernsey; 1918–1922	Succeeded by Douglas Falkland Carey
