= Douglas Carey =

Douglas Falkland Carey DSO (10 January 1876 – 2 January 1947) was an Anglican priest.

He was ordained in 1900, he was Dean of Guernsey from 1922 until 1931. He served as an Army Chaplain in the First World War and was awarded the Distinguished Service Order in the 1918 New Year Honours.

Carey was born in Nuwara Eliya, Sri Lanka, to Arthur Edward Carey and Blanche Amelia Carey. He married Ada Helen Barter in London in 1908.

Church of England titles
Preceded by John Brookes Vernon Penfold	Dean of Guernsey; 1922–1931	Succeeded by Agnew Walter Giles Giffard
