= John Macmillan (bishop) =

John Victor Macmillan OBE DD (1877–1956) was the fifth Bishop of Dover in the modern era who was later translated to Guildford.

Born into a publishing family (he was an uncle of Prime Minister Harold Macmillan), he was educated at Eton and Magdalen College, Oxford, where he was awarded 1st Class Honours in Modern History. From 1904 to 1915 he was resident chaplain to the Archbishop of Canterbury, Randall Davidson. He was a Temporary Chaplain to the Forces 1915–16 and 1917–19, and he conducted Davidson on his tour of the Western Front in 1917. He proved invaluable as an efficient and effective organiser at the headquarters of the Deputy Chaplain-General, for which he was appointed an OBE in 1919. He was vicar of Kew, Surrey, and Archdeacon of Maidstone (1921–1934), before his elevation to the episcopate.

Church of England titles
Preceded by Harold Bilbrough	Bishop of Dover; 1927 – 1934	Succeeded by Alfred Rose
Preceded by John Greig	Bishop of Guildford; 1934 – 1949	Succeeded by Henry Montgomery Campbell
