= Richard Thornden =

Warden of Canterbury College, Oxford and Bishop of Dover

Richard Thornden was an eminent 16th-century priest. In 1524 he was appointed Warden of Canterbury College, Oxford and after that was a Prebendary at Canterbury Cathedral. Appointed the second Bishop of Dover in 1545, he held the post until his death in 1557.
