= Richard Third =

- Bishop of Dover
- Diocese: Diocese of Canterbury
- In office: 1980–1992
- Predecessor: Tony Tremlett
- Successor: Richard Llewellin
- Other post: Bishop of Maidstone (1976–1980)

Orders
- Ordination: 1952 (deacon); 1953 (priest)
- Consecration: 1976

Personal details
- Born: 27 September 1927
- Died: 5 May 2016 (aged 88) Edinburgh, Scotland, United Kingdom
- Denomination: Anglican
- Parents: Henry McPhail & Marjorie Third
- Spouse: Helen Illingworth (m. 1966)
- Children: 2 daughters
- Education: Emmanuel College, Cambridge

Richard Henry McPhail Third (29 September 1927 – 5 May 2016) was an Anglican bishop in the Church of England.

== Education ==
Third was educated at Reigate Grammar School, and then Emmanuel College, Cambridge, where he gained a Master of Arts degree, before studying for ordination at Lincoln Theological College.

== Ecclesiastical career ==
He was made a deacon on Trinity Sunday 1952 (8 June), and ordained a priest the following Trinity Sunday (31 May 1953), both times by Bertram Simpson, Bishop of Southwark, at Southwark Cathedral.

He began his ordained ministry as a curate at St Andrew's Mottingham. He was later Vicar of Sheerness, and All Saints, Orpington then the Rural Dean of Orpington, before his ordination to the episcopate as the Bishop of Maidstone in 1976. He was consecrated a bishop on 30 November 1976, by Donald Coggan, Archbishop of Canterbury, at Canterbury Cathedral.

He was translated to be the Bishop of Dover in 1980 (after July) to assist Robert Runcie, the then Archbishop of Canterbury, and was the first Bishop of Dover to hold delegated authority to act as the effective diocesan bishop of the diocese, in the absence of the archbishop.

== Retirement ==
He retired in 1992 to the west of England, but had moved to Edinburgh by the time of his death, and he died there on 5 May 2016.

Church of England titles
Preceded by Geoffrey Tiarks	Bishop of Maidstone; 1976–1980	Succeeded by Robert Hardy
Preceded by Tony Tremlett	Bishop of Dover; 1980–1992	Succeeded by Richard Llewellin
