= Tim Barker (priest) =

British Anglican priest

The Very Reverend Tim Barker
- Dean of Guernsey
- Church: Church of England
- Diocese: Diocese of Salisbury
- In office: 2015–present
- Previous post: Archdeacon of Lincoln (2009–2015)

Orders
- Ordination: 1981

Personal details
- Born: 18 August 1956 (age 69)
- Denomination: Anglicanism

Timothy Reed Barker (born 18 August 1956) is a British Anglican priest. Since 2015, he has served as the Dean of Guernsey. From 2009 to 2015, he was the Archdeacon of Lincoln in the Diocese of Lincoln.

== Early life and education ==
Tim Barker was born on 18 August 1956. He was educated at Manchester Grammar School, Queens' College, Cambridge and Westcott House, Cambridge.

== Ordained ministry ==
He was ordained in 1981. After a curacy in Nantwich he was Vicar of Norton from 1983 to 1988; and then Runcorn until 1994. He was Chaplain to the Bishop of Chester from 1994 to 1998. In that year he became Vicar of Spalding, a post he held for 9 years.

Tim Barker became Dean of Guernsey at the end of November 2015.

Church of England titles
| Preceded by Arthur John Hawes | Archdeacon of Lincoln; 2009 to 2015 | Succeeded by Gavin Kirk |
| Preceded by Paul Mellor | Dean of Guernsey; 2015 to present | Incumbent |
