= Agnew Giffard =

Agnew Walter Giles Giffard was an Anglican priest in the first half of the 20th century.

Born in Guernsey on 28 April 1869, he was educated at Elizabeth College, Guernsey and The Queen's College, Oxford and ordained in 1895. After a curacy in Aylesford he held incumbencies at Manton, Messingham with East Butterwick and Sparsholt with Kingston Lisle.

In 1931 he became Dean of Guernsey, a post he held until his death in 1947.

Church of England titles
Preceded by Douglas Falkland Carey	Dean of Guernsey; 1931–1947	Succeeded by Edward Louis Frossard
