= Lewis Meredith =

Anglican bishop

Lewis Evan Meredith (1900 - 1968) was an Anglican bishop, the seventh Suffragan Bishop of Dover in the modern era.

Educated at Lancing College and Trinity College, Cambridge, he was ordained in 1923 and began his career with a curacy at Oswestry. From 1927 to 1931 he was a Minor Canon at Canterbury Cathedral and then held incumbencies at Wath-on-Dearne and Bognor Regis. Following this he was Rural Dean of Eastbourne before ascending to the Episcopate, a post he held for 7 years. In retirement he continued to serve the church as an Assistant Bishop within the Diocese of Gloucester.

== Notes ==
Church of England titles
Preceded by Alfred Carey Wollaston Rose	Bishop of Dover; 1957 –1964	Succeeded by Anthony Paul Tremlett
