= John Saumares =

John Saumares D.D. (d. 1 September 1697) was a Canon of Windsor from 1671 to 1697 and Dean of Guernsey from 1662 to 1697.

== Career ==
He was educated at Pembroke College, Oxford and graduated Doctor of Divinity in 1671.

He was appointed:

- Rector of St Martin's Guernsey 1662
- Dean of Guernsey 1662–1697
- Rector of Hartley Westpall 1682–1684
- Rector of Hasely 1688
- Chaplain to King Charles II

He was appointed to the fourth stall in St George's Chapel, Windsor Castle in 1671, and held the stall until 1697.
