= Edward Frossard =

English priest (1887–1968)

Edward Louis Frossard CBE (22 February 1887 — 13 August 1968) was an Anglican priest in the mid 20th century.

== Biography ==
Edward Frossard was born on 22 February 1887, educated at Durham University and ordained in 1913. After a curacy at Penkridge he was a Chaplain to the Forces during World War I. He was Rector of Saint Sampson, Guernsey from 1918 to 1965; and Dean of Guernsey from 1947 to 1967. He died on 13 August 1968.

Church of England titles
Preceded by Agnew Walter Giles Giffard	Dean of Guernsey; 1947–1967	Succeeded by Frederick Walter Cogman
