= John Foster (priest) =

John William Foster BEM (5 August 1921–7 March 2000) was an eminent Anglican priest in the second half of the twentieth century.

Foster was born in 1921 and served in the Leicestershire Yeomanry from 1939 to 1946. After studying at St Aidan's College, Birkenhead he was ordained deacon in 1954 and priest in 1955. After a curacy at All Saints Church, Loughborough (1954-1957) he moved to Hong Kong. He was Chaplain to the Hong Kong Defence Force and of the territory's cathedral. In 1960 he became its Precentor and in 1963 its Dean, a post he held for a decade. He was the Vicar of Church of St Oswald, Lythe from 1973 to 1978; and Dean of Guernsey from 1978 until 1988.

He died in 2000.

Church of England titles
| Preceded by Barry Till | Dean of Hong Kong; 1963–1973 | Succeeded by Rex Howe |
| Preceded by Frederick Cogman | Dean of Guernsey; 1978–1988 | Succeeded by Jeffrey Fenwick |
