= HMS Tyne (1878) =

Ship of the line of the Royal Navy

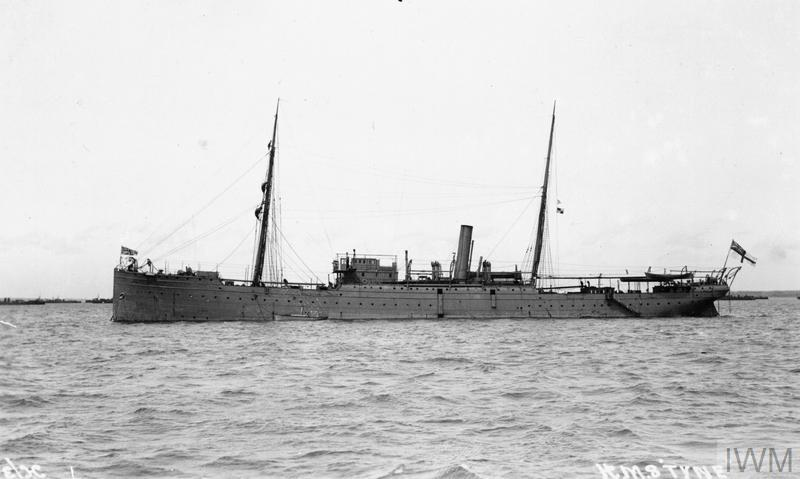
- HMS Tyne

History

United Kingdom
- Name: Mariotis (1878); HMS Tyne (1878–1920)
- Builder: Charles Mitchell, Low Walker
- Yard number: 354
- Launched: 19 January 1878
- Completed: June 1878
- Acquired: 8 March 1878
- Fate: Foundered 16 November 1920

General characteristics
- Type: merchant ship, store ship
- Tonnage: 2,141 GRT, 1,392 NRT
- Displacement: 3,560 long tons (3,620 t)
- Length: 320.0 ft (97.5 m)
- Beam: 34.0 ft (10.4 m)
- Draught: 18 ft 6 in (5.64 m)
- Depth: 24.6 ft (7.5 m)
- Propulsion: 1 × screw; 1 × compound engine
- Armament: Gun deck: 2 guns

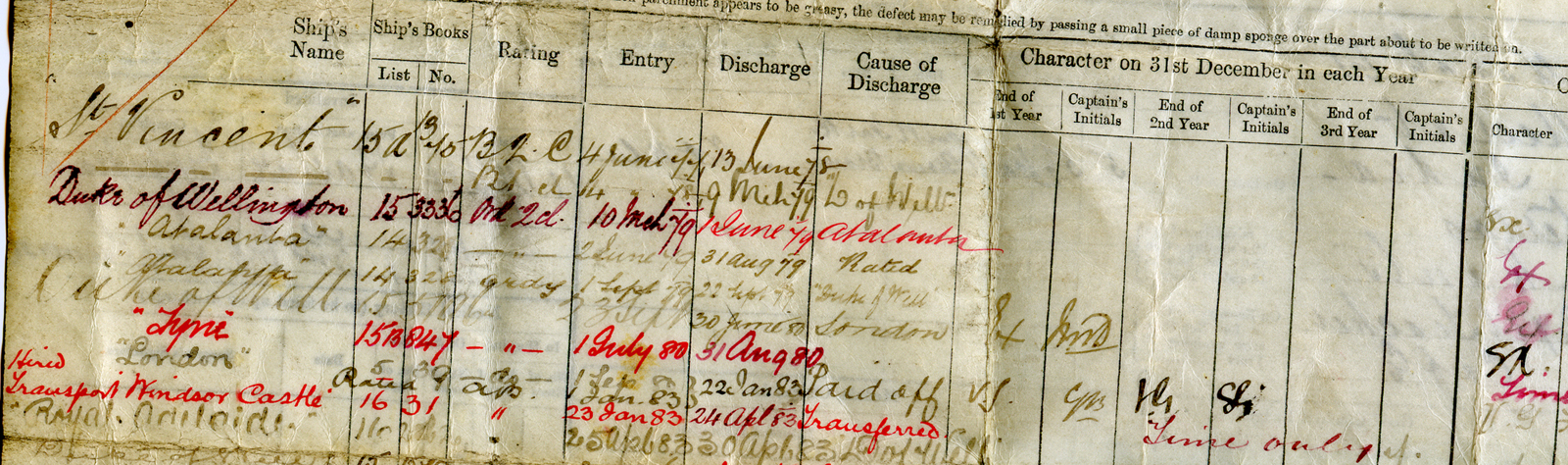
A Royal Navy service record showing time served on the Storeship HMS Tyne

HMS Tyne was a Royal Navy store ship. Charles Mitchell of Low Walker, Newcastle upon Tyne built her as yard number 354, and launched her on 19 January 1878 as the merchant ship Mariotis for the Moss Steam Ship Company of Liverpool. The Admiralty bought her for the Royal Navy on 8 March 1878. She was completed in June 1878.

Commanded by Commander John Edward Stokes on 12 March 1879.

On 31 August 1880 the Tyne is shown delivering personnel to HMS London in Zanzibar..

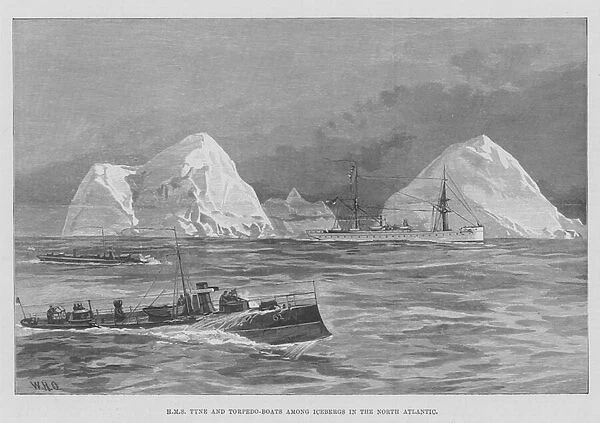
HMS Tyne and Torpedo-Boats among Icebergs in the North Atlantic. Illustrated London News 1890

In October 1886, she ran aground at Sheerness, Kent. She was refloated and found to be undamaged. In May 1902 she was at Malta, on her way to the China station with a new crew for Hermionee. In early January 1903 she was back in the Mediterranean, and took part in a three-weeks cruise with other ships of the station in the Greek islands around Corfu.

In February 1913, Tyne was serving as one of two depot ships for the 8th Patrol Flotilla, based on the Nore, which was equipped with 23 torpedo boats, and remained as depot ship to the 8th Flotilla in July 1914.

On 16 November 1920 Tyne sprang a leak and sank in the River Medway at Chatham, Kent, while awaiting sale.
