= Tony Tremlett (bishop) =

The Right Reverend Tony Tremlett
- Bishop of Dover
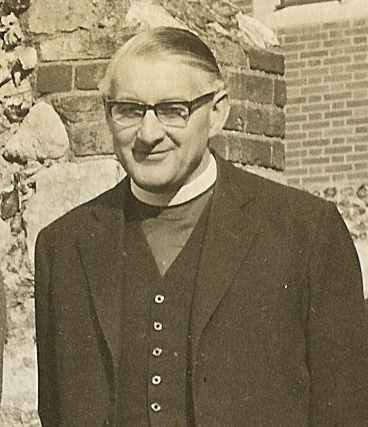
- Tremlett in 1968
- Church: Church of England
- Diocese: Diocese of Canterbury
- In office: 1964 to 1980
- Predecessor: Lewis Meredith
- Successor: Richard Third

Orders
- Ordination: 1938 (deacon); 1939 (priest)
- Consecration: 1964

Personal details
- Born: Anthony Paul Tremlett; 14 May 1914
- Died: 22 August 1992 (aged 78)
- Denomination: Anglicanism

Anthony Paul Tremlett (14 May 1914 – 22 August 1992) was an Anglican bishop in the second half of the 20th century.

== Education & private life ==
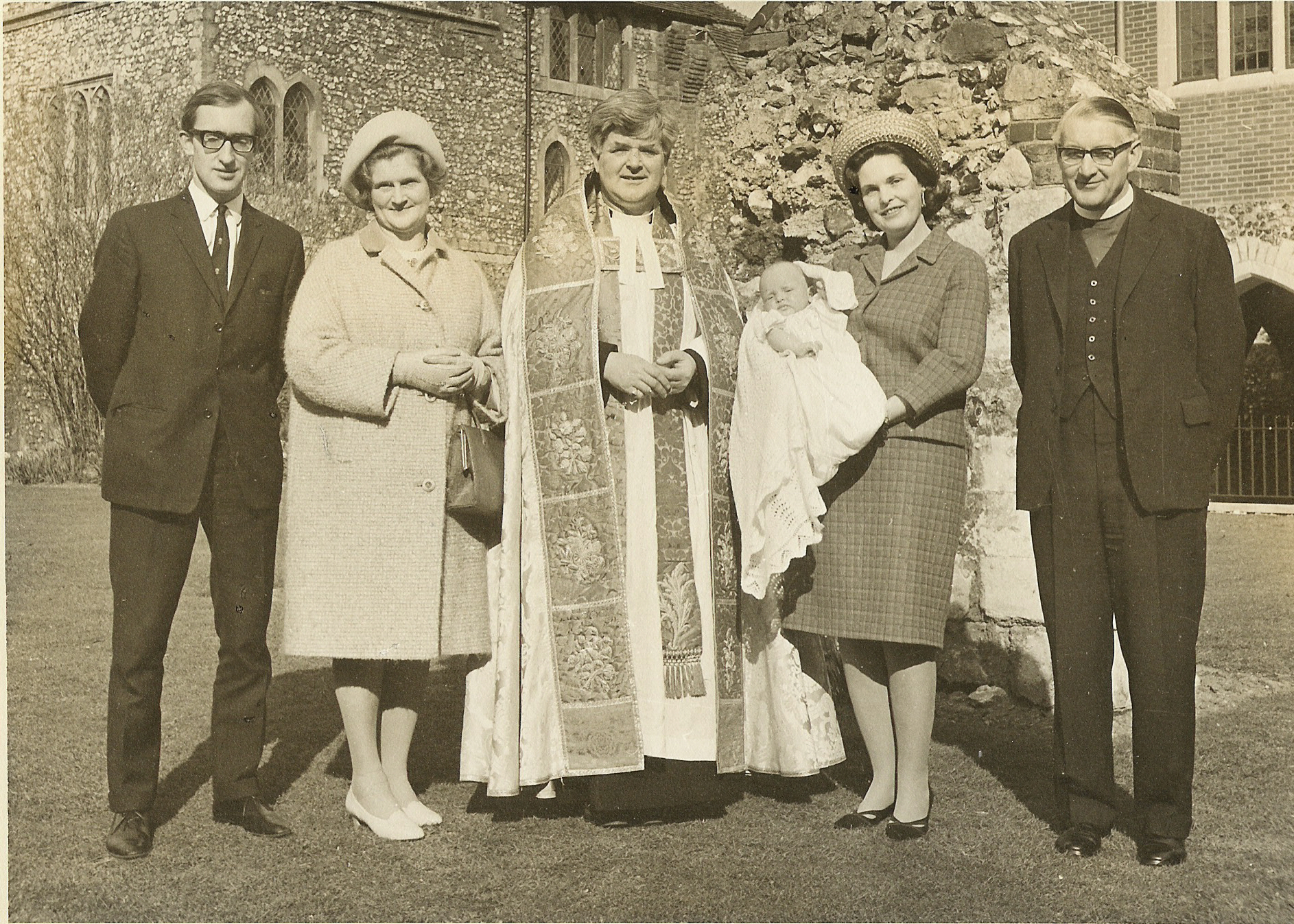
Bishop Tony Tremlett (extreme right) at the baptism of one of his 26 Godsons.

Tremlett was educated at King's School, Bruton and King's College, Cambridge before studying for ordination at Cuddesdon, an Anglo-Catholic/high church theological college of the Church of England.

He remained unmarried and single throughout his life, although he had twenty-six godchildren (all boys) with all of whom he stayed in regular contact. Following his retirement in 1980, he lived with a resident Housekeeper in the Cotswold town of Northleach, where he died on 22 August 1992, aged 78. He left £175,000 (equivalent to £390,000 in 2025) in his will.

== Ordained ministry ==
Tremlett was ordained in the Church of England as a deacon in 1938 and as a priest in 1939. He began his career with a curacy at St Barnabas, Northolt, from where he rose steadily in the Church hierarchy. During the Second World War, he was a chaplain to the British Armed Forces. On 30 April 1941, he was commissioned in the Royal Army Chaplains' Department, British Army, as a chaplain to the forces 4th class (equivalent in rank to a captain). He first served as chaplain with the 40th Division; in reality, this was a phantom division consisting of only the 43rd Infantry Brigade, rebranded in attempt to deceive the enemy. From 1943, he served as Anglican chaplain to the 4th Battalion, Coldstream Guards, 6th Guards Tank Brigade. He accompanied them across northern France, from the Normandy landings. In November 1945, he was mentioned in despatches "in recognition of gallant and distinguished service in North-West Europe" He was demobilised from the army in 1946.

After the war, he served as Domestic Chaplain to Fabian Menteath Elliot Jackson, the Bishop of Trinidad; Jackson had been his training incumbent. Then, from 1949 to 1958, returned to his alma mater the University of Cambridge as college chaplain at Trinity Hall, Cambridge. He was then Vicar of St Stephen with St John, Westminster. In 1964, he was elevated to the episcopate as Bishop of Dover, a suffragan bishop in the Diocese of Canterbury. As the Archbishop of Canterbury was often engaged in duties relating to the wider Church of England, as the senior suffragan of the diocese he would deputise for him. However, his talents lay not with administration but as a pastor to the clergy of his diocese and he would make himself available at short notice to travel to a rural parish in need or to meet with an overworked and isolated priest. He retired in 1980, having served under three archbishops.

Tremlett had both Anglo-Catholic and traditionalist Anglican leanings. He defended the use of the traditional language of the King James Bible and the Book of Common Prayer. He did not support modernist (i.e. liberal) changes to the church, and in retirement "seemed to distance himself from the institutional church".

He acquired a positive reputation for being skilled in encouraging vocations to ordination amongst young men, and 50 ordinands and priests whose vocations he had personally encouraged clubbed together to purchase his episcopal regalia on his elevation to the episcopate. Nonetheless, in retirement he often bemoaned the fact that, despite his careful prayers, only one of his 26 godsons took Holy Orders. During his retirement he served as an honorary assistant bishop in the Diocese of Gloucester, and as an honorary assistant priest at Northleach parish church. He also officiated daily at his own private chapel, in his home "Doctors Commons".

== Styles ==
- Mr Anthony Paul Tremlett (1914-1938)
- The Reverend Anthony Paul Tremlett (1938-1941)
- The Reverend Anthony Paul Tremlett CF (1941-1964)
- The Right Reverend Anthony Paul Tremlett (1964-1992)

Church of England titles
| Preceded by Lewis Evan Meredith | Bishop of Dover; 1964 –1980 | Succeeded by Richard Henry McPhail Third |
