= Gavin Kirk (priest) =

British Anglican priest

Gavin John Kirk (born 8 December 1961) is a British Anglican priest. Since 2016 he has been the Archdeacon of Lincoln.

Kirk was born and raised in Lincolnshire. He was educated at the universities of Durham and Chichester, and Chichester Theological College. He was ordained in 1987, and began his curacy at St Leonard's, Seaford. He was Chaplain at Rochester Cathedral from 1989 to 1991, and Chaplain at King's School, Rochester from 1991 to 1998. He became Precentor of Portsmouth in 1998, and was Precentor of Lincoln from 2003 until 2016.

== Ordained ministry ==
=== Early posts ===
He was ordained in 1987 and began his career with a curacy at St Leonard, Seaford. He was a Chaplain at Rochester Cathedral from 1989 to 1991; and a Chaplain at King's School, Rochester from 1991 to 1998.

=== Senior posts ===
He became a Canon Residentiary at Portsmouth Cathedral in 1998; and Canon Residentiary, (Precentor) at Lincoln Cathedral in 2003.

Church of England titles
Preceded by Tim Barker	Archdeacon of Lincoln; 2016–present	Incumbent
