= Frederick Cogman =

Frederick Walter Cogman AKC (4 March 1913 – 23 July 2005) was Dean of Guernsey from 1967 to 1978

He was born on 4 March 1913, educated at Rutlish Grammar School and King's College London, and ordained in 1938. After a curacy at Upton-cum-Chalvey he became Chaplain and Housemaster of St George's School, Harpenden. He was Rector of St Martin, Guernsey from 1948 to 1976; and of St Peter Port from then until 1978.

He died on 23 July 2005.

Church of England titles
Preceded by Edward Louis Frossard	Dean of Guernsey; 1967– 1978	Succeeded by John William Foster
