= Thomas Bell (Anglican priest) =

Thomas Bell, Rector of the Vale Church, Dean of Guernsey, and Canon of Winchester Cathedral, was an eminent Anglican priest in the latter part of the 19th and the early part of the 20th centuries.

== Biography ==
He was born on 5 November 1820 and educated at Elizabeth College, Guernsey, and subsequently at Exeter College, Oxford, where he matriculated in 1840 and gained a First Class degree in Classics.

He subsequently won the Denyer Prize Theological Essay in 1848, after being ordained in 1845 by Bishop Samuel Wilberforce at Christ Church, Oxford. He began his career with a curacy at Finstock, near Oxford. After this he held incumbencies at St Matthew's, City Road, in the East End of London, and St Mary's, Burston, near Diss in Norfolk. He then returned to Guernsey, where for more than 50 years he was Rector of the Church of St Michel du Valle. Every Sunday he used to conduct the service in French and preached the sermon without notes. And twice a year he journeyed by sea and train to Winchester in order to preach in the cathedral of which he was a canon.

In the 1880s, Bell visited Jerusalem, writing afterwards, "To enter modern Jerusalem is to be disenchanted."

He was Dean of Guernsey from 1892 until his death on 31 October 1917.

He married Blanche Henrietta Lihou, the daughter of Thomas Lihou of Union Street, St Peter Port, at St Martin's Church, Guernsey, on 11 April 1849. In 1891 the Dean and his wife presented to the Vale Church a peal of six fine-toned bells in memory of their doctor son, Thomas Arthur Bell, who had died in Exeter three years previously.

On his death the Archbishop of Canterbury telegraphed to the Dean's daughter "I thank God for the long and devoted life of him who was for more than a generation the Chief Minister of Christ in Guernsey", whilst the head of the Église Catholique on the island wrote "Il vient de mourir un homme qui faisait honneur à l'homme".
