= Bishop of Dover =

Suffragan bishop in the Church of England

anglican
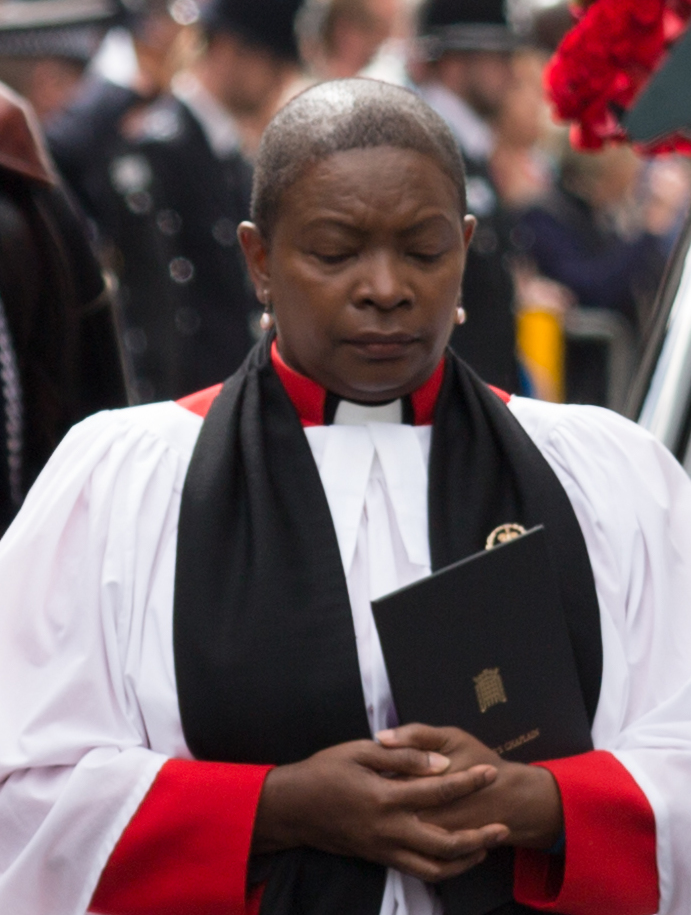
- Incumbent: Rose Hudson-Wilkin

Location
- Ecclesiastical province: Canterbury

Information
- First holder: Richard Yngworth
- Established: 1536
- Diocese: Canterbury

The Bishop of Dover is an episcopal title used by a suffragan bishop of the Church of England Diocese of Canterbury, England. The title takes its name after the town of Dover in Kent. The Bishop of Dover holds the additional title of "Bishop in Canterbury" and is empowered to act almost as if the Bishop of Dover were the diocesan bishop of Canterbury, since the actual diocesan bishop (the Archbishop of Canterbury) is based at Lambeth Palace in London, and thus is frequently away from the diocese, fulfilling national and international duties. Among other things, this gives the Bishop of Dover an ex officio seat in the church's General Synod. There is another suffragan, the Bishop of Maidstone, who has different responsibilities.

The role of the Bishop of Dover in the Diocese of Canterbury is comparable to that of the Cardinal Vicar in the Roman Catholic Diocese of Rome, who exercises most functions that the Pope, the Bishop of Rome, formally has in his own diocese. The arrangements by which the Bishop of Dover acts as if the Bishop of Dover were the diocesan bishop date from 1980, under provisions in section 10 of the Dioceses Measure 1978. The 2001 report To Lead and to Serve recommended making these arrangement more permanent and styling the pseudo–diocesan bishop as "Bishop in Canterbury"; that style was already in use before the review.

The current bishop of Dover is Rose Hudson-Wilkin. She was consecrated at St Paul's Cathedral on 19 November 2019 and installed at Canterbury Cathedral on 30 November 2019.

== List of bishops of Dover ==
Bishops of Dover
From	Until	Incumbent	Notes
1536	1545	Richard Yngworth	Consecrated on 9 December 1536; died in 1545.
1545	1557	Richard Thornden	Consecrated in 1545; died in 1557.
1557	1569	no appointment	
1569	1597	Richard Rogers	Consecrated on 15 May 1569; died 19 May 1597.
1597	1870	in abeyance	
1870	1890	Edward Parry	
1890	1897	Rodney Eden	Translated to Wakefield.
1898	1916	William Walsh	
1916	1927	Harold Bilbrough	Translated to Newcastle.
1927	1934	John Macmillan	Translated to Guildford.
1935	1957	Alfred Rose	
1957	1964	Lewis Meredith	
1964	1980	Anthony Tremlett	
1980	1992	Richard Third	Formerly Bishop of Maidstone; first pseudo-diocesan.
1992	1999	Richard Llewellin	Formerly Bishop of St Germans.
1999	2009	Stephen Venner	(b. 1944). Formerly Bishop of Middleton.
2010	2019	Trevor Willmott	(b. 1951). Formerly Bishop of Basingstoke; retired 12 May 2019.
2019	present	Rose Hudson-Wilkin	Formerly Chaplain to the Speaker of the House of Commons. Consecrated 19 November 2019. Installed 30 November 2019.
