= Jeffrey Fenwick =

Jeffery Robert Fenwick (1930-2014) was an eminent Anglican priest in the last quarter of the twentieth century.

== History ==
He was born on 8 April 1930, educated at Pembroke College, Cambridge and ordained in 1956. After a curacy at St Thomas the Martyr, Upholland he became Priest in charge at Daramombe in what is now Zimbabwe. After incumbencies in Gatooma and Salisbury East he became Archdeacon of Charter in 1970 and Dean of Bulawayo in 1975. He was a Canon Residentiary at Worcester Cathedral from 1978 until 1985 when he became Dean of Guernsey, a post he held until his retirement six years later. He retired to Port Alfred in the Eastern Cape and died in 2014.
