= Frederick Konig =

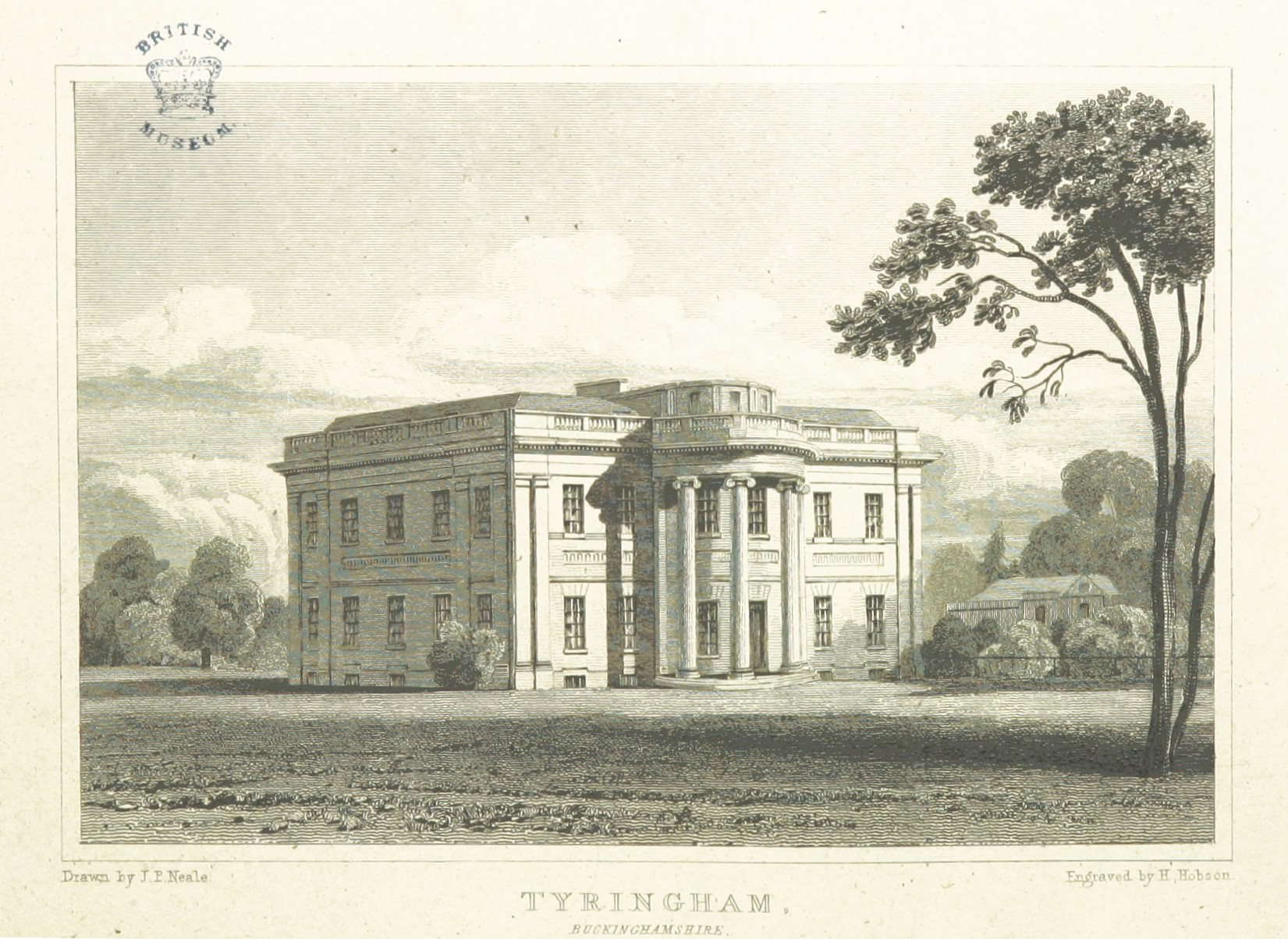
Tyringham Hall in 1818 without the copper dome added during Konig's ownership.

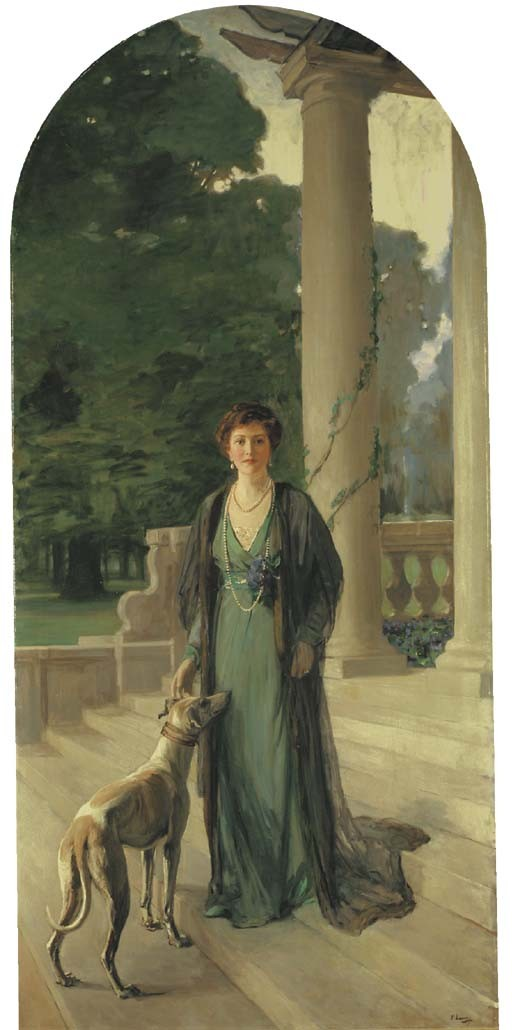
Portrait of Baroness Gerda von Chappuis (Mrs F.A. Konig), John Lavery, c. 1910. Oil on canvas.

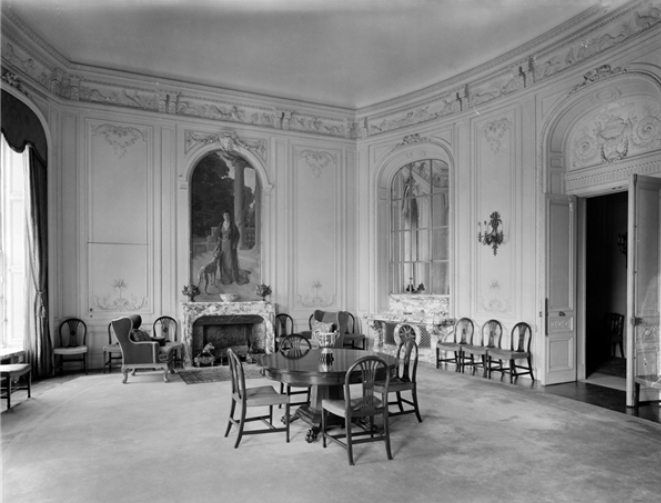
Tyringham Hall interior showing the portrait of Mrs Konig in its original location.

Frederick Adolphus Konig (1867–1940) was an American banker of German ancestry who emigrated to England at the end of the nineteenth century. He was the owner of Tyringham Hall in Buckinghamshire for which he commissioned works by the architect Edwin Lutyens.

== Early life ==
Frederick Konig was born in College Point, Long Island, New York, in 1867, the second of three sons of Friedrick Konig (1826–1905) and Alette, daughter of Johannes Houtuyn Cramer. His father had made a fortune from patenting a process for the hardening of rubber. Frederick moved to England around 1890.

== Career ==
Konig and his brother Hans were partners in the banking firm of Konig Brothers in London. In 1923, at the behest of the governor of the Bank of England, the firm merged with Frederick Huth & Company which had been in an increasingly parlous state since the death of Frederick Huth Jackson in 1921. Frederick Konig became a partner in the merged firm.

Konig retired in 1936 when Frederick Huth & Company was transferred to the British Overseas Bank.

== Tyringham ==
In 1907, Konig bought Tyringham Hall in Buckinghamshire, a house designed and built by Sir John Soane between 1792 and 1797 for the banker and member of parliament William Praed.

In 1909, Konig commissioned the London architect Charles G.F. Rees, to add a copper dome to the hall, carry out refacing works, and redesign the principal rooms of the house in the French style.

In 1915–16, during the First World War, parts of Tyringham Hall were used as a convalescent centre for injured British soldiers.

Through his interest in theosophy, Konig came to know the architect Edwin Lutyens, whose wife, Lady Emily Bulwer-Lytton, was also interested in the subject. As a result, Lutyens was commissioned in 1920 to design a classical-style temple of music and a bathing pavilion in the gardens of the house. He also designed a war memorial to the dead of the First World War at the Church of St Peter, Tyringham. The memorial was unveiled by Princess Marie Louise on 23 June 1921.

== Family and personal life ==
Konig married in 1906, Baroness Gerda (Gertrude) von Chappuis, born in Saxony, Germany, around 1874. Gerda Konig was a Lady-in-Waiting to Princess Marie Louise. She was painted by John Lavery in around 1910 on a canvas designed to fit into a recess above one of the mantlepieces at Tyringham Hall.

The Konigs had two sons, Kilian Louis de Chappuis (born 1910) and Marcus Louis de Chappuis (1913–1966).

Konig financed the construction of a school and reading room at Filgrave, near Tyringham, to commemorate the coronation of King George V in 1911. The school and reading room still exists but the school was closed in the 1980s and in 2012 was in use as a nursery. The building is maintained by the De Chappuis Konig Charities whose trustees include Caroline Konig and Alistair Konig.

In 1930, the Konigs donated an Albrecht Dürer print of Saint George to Yale University Art Gallery in memory of their nephew Frederic George Achelis.

Konig also had a home at 44 Rutland Gate, London. He was a member of the Carlton Club.

== Death ==
Konig died in 1940 and was buried in a plot to the rear of the Church of St Peter, Tyringham. His grave was designed by Edwin Lutyens.

== See also ==
- Nina Campbell
