= Haverstock (disambiguation) =

Haverstock could refer to:

- Haverstock (ward), an electoral ward in the London Borough of Camden
- Haverstock Hill, a street and former locality
  - Haverstock Hill railway station, opened by the Midland Railway in 1868
  - Haverstock School (formerly: Haverstock Comprehensive School), a comprehensive school on Haverstock Hill
- Lynda Haverstock (born 1948), leader of the Saskatchewan Liberal Party
