= Cambridge Gate =

Terrace in London, England

General information
- Type: Residential
- Architectural style: Renaissance revival
- Location: London, England
- Coordinates: 51°31′37″N 0°08′43″W
- Completed: 1877

Design and construction
- Architects: Archer & Green

Listed Building – Grade II
- Official name: Numbers 1-10 and Attached Railings
- Designated: 14 May 1974
- Reference no.: 1244289

Cambridge Gate is a terrace of ten houses on the eastern side of Regent's Park in London. The terrace along with the gates and railings are Grade II listed.

== History and description ==
The houses were built on the former site of Decimus Burton's London Colosseum. Following its demolition in 1875, it was built as an addition to Cambridge Terrace to its north, they were designed by Archer & Green in a high Victorian French Renaissance style. The architects ensured Cambridge Gate neatly mirrored its neighbour, with its string courses remaining parallel; both are named for Adolphus, Duke of Cambridge, one of George IV's brothers.

Of a bath stone facing, rare in London, the houses are of a unique style among the many terraces around Regent's Park which are otherwise typical of Regency tastes, with their long fronts of unified stucco facades. Its design likely inspired the large mansion block of Harley House on Marylebone Road, by Boehmer & Gibbs, two former assistants of Archer & Green.

== See also ==
- Cambridge Terrace
