= Mansfield Road =

Mansfield Road may refer to:

- Mansfield Road, London, a street in Great London, England
- Mansfield Road, Oxford, a street in Oxfordshire, England
