= Tyringham Hall =

Grade I listed house in Tyringham, Buckinghamshire, England

Coordinates: 52.11390°N 0.75177°W

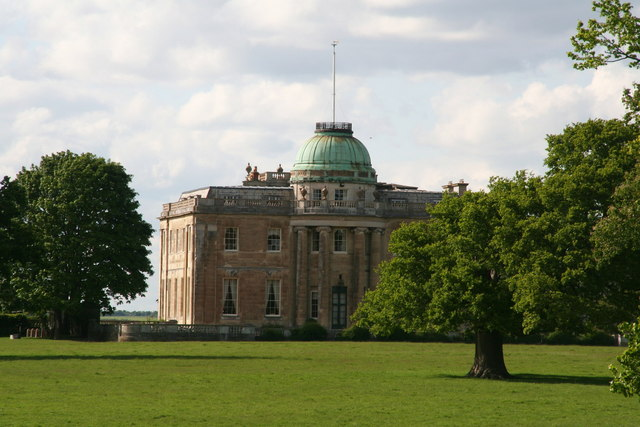

- Location in Buckinghamshire
- Nearest city: Milton Keynes

Site notes
- Architect(s): Sir John Soane, Ernst von Ihne, Sir Edwin Lutyens
- Architectural style: Neoclassical

Listed Building – Grade I
- Official name: Tyringham Hall
- Designated: 3 March 1952
- Reference no.: 1115849

Listed Building – Grade I
- Official name: Stable Block to North East of Tyringham Hall (including Stables Flats 1 and 2)
- Designated: 3 March 1952
- Reference no.: 1289308

Listed Building – Grade I
- Official name: Tyringham Bridge
- Designated: 3 March 1952
- Reference no.: 1320229

Listed Building – Grade I
- Official name: Tyringham Lodges
- Designated: 3 March 1952
- Reference no.: 1115893

National Register of Historic Parks and Gardens
- Official name: Tyringham Hall garden and park
- Type: Grade II*
- Designated: 30 August 1987
- Reference no.: 1000476

Tyringham Hall (/ˈtiːrɪŋəm/) is a Grade I listed country house, designed by Sir John Soane in 1792. It is located in Tyringham near Newport Pagnell, Buckinghamshire, England. Originally built for William Praed, the estate was bought by an American banker, Frederick Konig in the early 20th century. Konig undertook an extensive reconstruction of the house, adding the copper-clad dome to the roofline, and engaged Sir Edwin Lutyens to undertake a similarly drastic overhaul of the house's gardens. Tyringham remains privately owned and is not open to the public.

== History ==
The manor of Tyringham was held by the Tyringham family from the Middle Ages until the late 17th century. In around 1670, the estate was sold to Edward Backwell, a financier and politician. It remained the property of the Backwells for just over a century, before passing through marriage to William Praed (1747-1833). Praed, a banker, businessman and politician, descended from family with roots in Cornwall. Following his marriage to Elizabeth Backwell in 1778, Praed commissioned Sir John Soane to design a new house adjacent to the original medieval manor house. Soane later described his time working at Tyringham as, "six of the most happy years of my life".

In 1907 the hall was bought by an American banker Frederick Konig who commissioned Ernst von Ihne to remodel the house including the addition of a copper dome to the portico. Later, in 1911, Charles G. F. Rees was brought in to lay out the oval forecourt and rose garden. Later additions were made by Edwin Lutyens in 1924, including a bathing pavilion, the Temple of Music and a pergola. Tyringham Hall stands in Lutyens’ formally laid-out gardens, with a tree-lined drive leading past the deer park to a gravel sweep in front of the house. The façade features stone columns with sphinxes on either side of the entrance porch leading to the reception rooms. The Temple of Music had a Welte-Philharmonic Organ.

On Konig's death in 1940, the house was requisitioned to act as a wartime maternity hospital. After the war it was purchased by the Australia and New Zealand Bank as a weekend club. In 1967, the house reopened as clinic managed by Sidney Rose-Neil, where patients were treated with naturopathic medicine.

In 2001, Tyringham Hall was discovered to have asbestos and was temporarily closed. It was purchased by Anton Bilton, grandson of the prefabricated housing tycoon Percy Bilton, and his wife Lisa Barbuscia-Bilton. Since 2004 they have invested around £10 million in renovating Tyringham Hall. A vineyard was established in the grounds in 2008. The house was put up for sale in May 2013 with an asking price of £18 million.

== Architecture and landscape ==
Tyringham is built in ashlar stone, and is of two storeys with basements and attics. The Mansard roof and copper dome are of 1909 by Ernst von Ihne. (Note: Several of Soane's designs for Tyringham did include a dome but Elizabeth Williamson describes that which was built as "nothing like" Soane's options.) The interior largely retains Soane's floorplan, but almost all of his decoration was swept away in Frederick Koning's reconstruction in the early 20th century. Elizabeth Williamson, in the Buckinghamshire volume in the Buildings of England series, revised and reissued in 2003, describes the combined efforts of Konig, his wife and of von Ihne as having, "ruthlessly embellished Soane's house and its surroundings in a Continental Baroque taste entirely at odds with Soane's severe Neoclassicism".

Edwin Lutyens' redesign of the grounds created a long axis running north-west from the rear of the house. Along the axis, Lutyens placed three pools; firstly a long, rectangular swimming pool, which terminates in the Temple of Music to the right, and the Bathing Pavilion to the left; then a circular pool with columns; and finally a shorter rectangular pool. (Note: In the 21st century, the last of the three pools was filled in and is now the site of a tennis court.)

=== Historic listing designations ===
Tyringham Hall is a Grade I listed building. The stable block by Soane, his entrance lodges and his bridge also have Grade I listings. Tyringham's parkland is listed at Grade II* on Historic England's Register of Historic Parks and Gardens of Special Historic Interest in England. Also listed at Grade II* are two garden buildings by Sir Edwin Lutyens, the Temple of Music and the Bathing Pavilion.

Landscaping features listed at Grade II include three sets of gate piers, two sets of columns and capitals, three sets of walling, a fountain in the entrance forecourt, a statue of Time, and the kitchen garden.

== Gallery ==
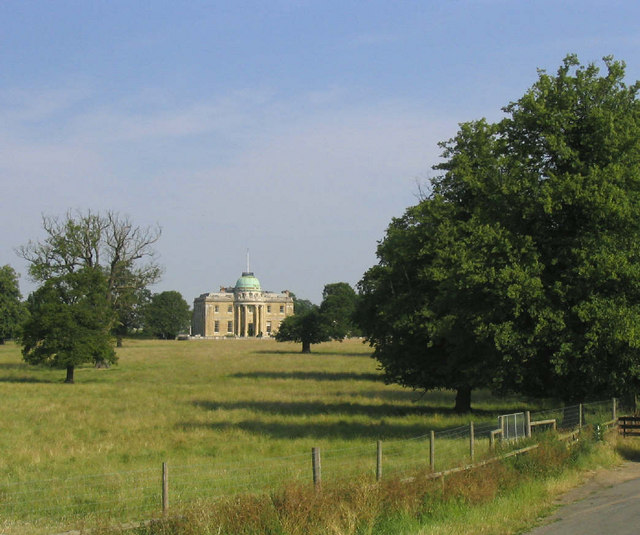
The hall within its park

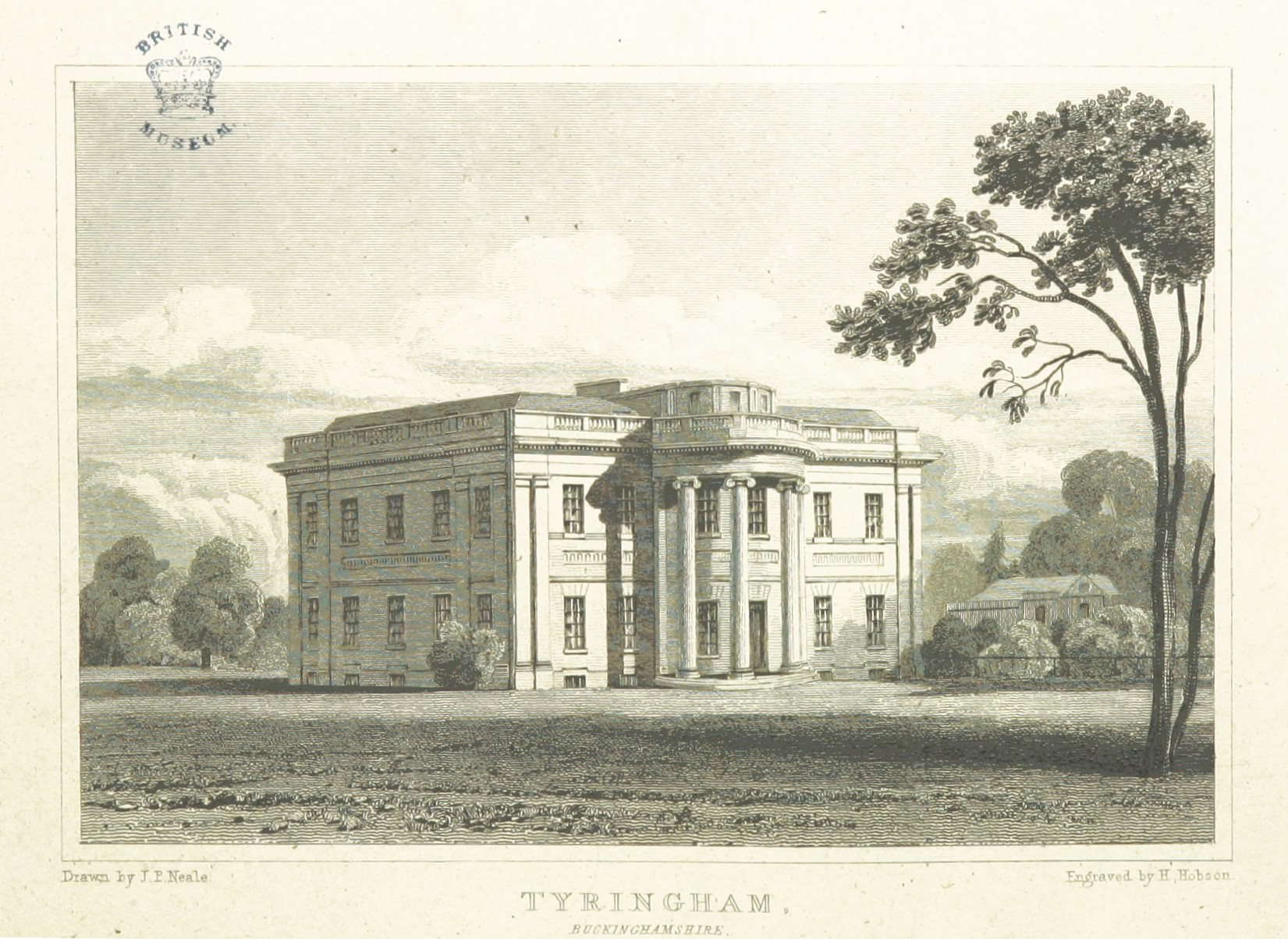
The hall in 1818

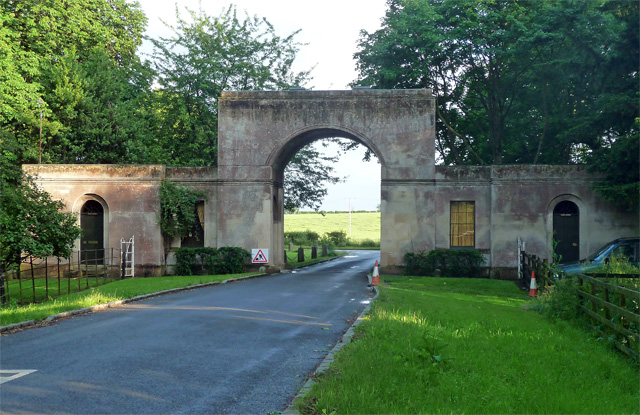
Entrance lodges by Sir John Soane

== Sources ==
- Page, William, ed. (1927). "Parishes: Tyringham with Filgrave". A History of the County of Buckingham. Vol. 4. London: Victoria County History.
- Savills, ed. (2013). Tyringham Hall (PDF). London: Savills.
- Williamson, Elizabeth; Pevsner, Nikolaus (2003). Buckinghamshire. The Buildings of England. New Haven, USA and London: Yale University Press. ISBN 0-3000-9584-8.
