= Mary Cozens-Walker =

English textile artist and painter (1938–2020)

- detail from a multi media self portrait
- Born: Mary Louise Cozens-Walker; 11 August 1938; Harrow, England
- Died: 4 July 2020 (aged 81); Cambridgeshire, England
- Other names: Mary Green
- Occupation: Artist
- Years active: 1959–2018
- Spouse: Anthony Green (m. 1961)
- Children: 2

Mary Cozens-Walker (married name Mary Green, 11 August 1938 – 4 July 2020) was an English textile artist and painter best known for her three-dimensional works pertaining to her own domestic life. She exhibited in the United Kingdom, Japan, and the United States. She has appeared as a model in about 600 paintings. Her own work is in national collections, and there are also paintings of her in national collections.

== Personal life ==
Mary Cozens-Walker was born on 11 August 1938 in Harrow, Middlesex. She was educated at North London Collegiate School, London (where she was taught by Peggy Angus) and the Slade School of Art (where her contemporaries included Mario Dubsky, Dorothy Mead and Dennis Creffield and future RAs Ben Levene, Patrick Procktor and Anthony Green). Her tutors at the Slade included William Coldstream, Cecil Beaton, Lucian Freud, L.S. Lowry and David Bomberg.

In 1961 she married Anthony Green, and they had two daughters, Kate and Lucy. In 1967 she traveled to America when Green received a Harkness Fellowship and spent two years living in Leonia, New Jersey and Altadena, California.

== Professional life ==
Cozens-Walker's early artistic influences included Stanley Spencer, Piero della Francesca and the Euston Road School. As she developed her style, fairground art, ship's figureheads and stumpwork also began to be referenced in her work.

In the 1960s and 1970s Cozens-Walker continued to paint, but found it more and more constrictive. She had begun to experiment with stitching in America, and embroidery via individual projects, and this led to her seeking professional advice from the Royal School of Needlework. Cozens-Walker returned to education in 1981 to complete a postgraduate Diploma in Embroidery and Textiles at Goldsmiths.

Cozens-Walker made her name as an artist combining paint, textiles and papier-mâché, and led to solo exhibitions in the UK, Japan and North America.

Cozens-Walker was also the life-long muse to Green, with their relationship portrayed in maybe 600 of his pictures from the 1960s to her death in 2020. They appeared together in programmes such as The South Bank Show with Melvyn Bragg. Some of the paintings of her are in national collections.

== Public collections ==
- Setagaya Art Museum, Tokyo
- Arts Council of Great Britain, London
- Sainsbury Centre for Visual Arts, Norwich
- 'The Whole Cottage' V&A, London

== Exhibitions ==
- Young Contemporaries: Painting 'Women at their toilet' (reproduced in The Daily Telegraph).
- Royal Academy Summer Exhibition 1982, 1993, 2008, 1990, 1991.
- Ginza Art Space, Tokyo, Japan: Objects of Obsession solo exhibition 1992.
- Staempfli Gallery, NYC, US, 1992.
- Fishguard Music Festival: Artist in residence 1993.
- Bankfield Museum: 'From Painted Textures to Stitched Objects' 2001.
- Boundary Gallery, London, 2001.
- Victoria and Albert Museum, London, 2004.
- Fiberart Gallery, solo exhibition 2004.
- Boundary Gallery 'Painting with Thread' exhibition, 2007.
- Ruthin Craft Centre 2013.

== Books ==
- Objects of Obsession 1955-2011, Healeys Print Group
