= Edward Boehmer =

American architect

- Born: 1861; Pennsylvania, U.S.
- Died: 1940
- Occupation: Architect

Edward Boehmer (1861–1940) was an American-born, London-based architect.

== Early life ==
Edward Boehmer was born in 1861 in Pennsylvania, United States. He was educated in Stuttgart, Germany.

== Career ==
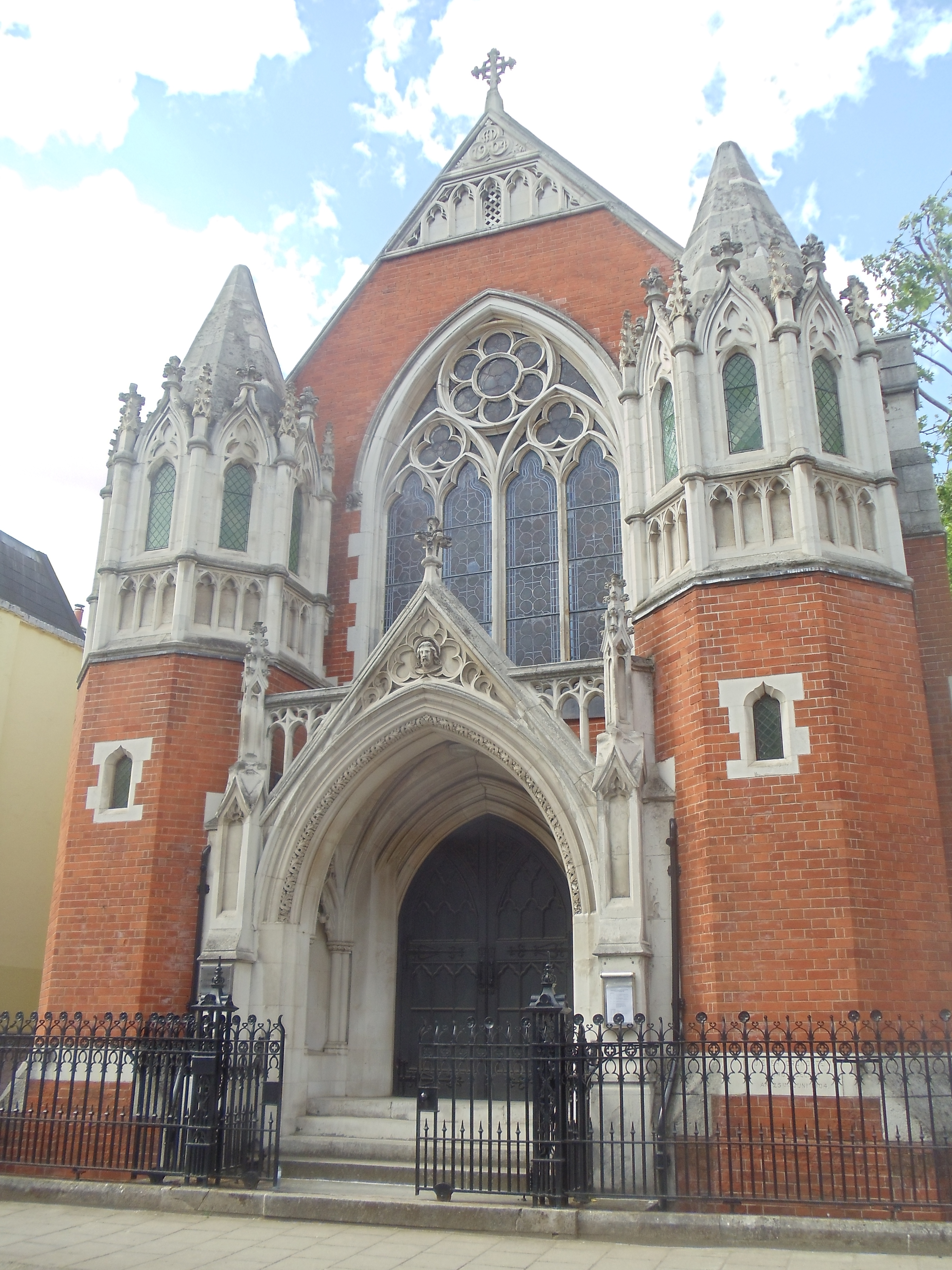
Deutsche Evangelische Christuskirche in 2015.

Boehmer co-founded an architectural firm with Percy Christian Gibbs in 1889. Together, they designed Harley House on Marylebone Road in Marylebone in 1904. They also designed Cavendish Mansions in West Hampstead, and the Lissenden Gardens mansion estate. They designed Portland Court, located at 160–200 Great Portland Street in Fitzrovia, from 1904 to 1912. Meanwhile, they designed 80 Portland Place in 1909.

With Charles G. F. Rees, Boehmer designed the Deutsche Evangelische Christuskirche in Knightsbridge in 1904-1905.

== Death ==
Boehmer died in 1940.
