= Lismore Circus =

Street in Gospel Oak, London

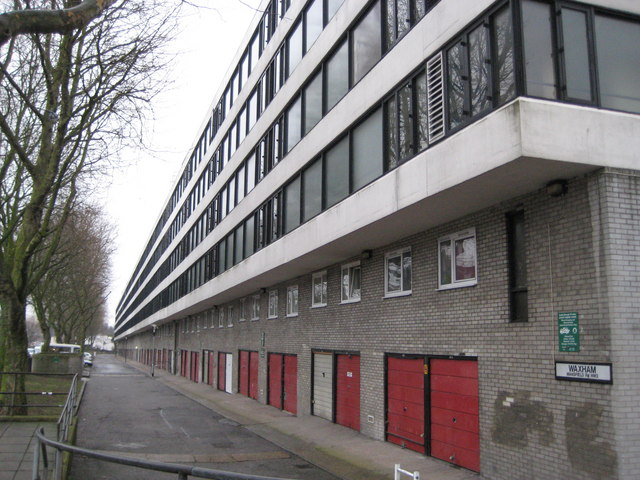
Lismore Circus estate in 2010.

Lismore Circus is a housing estate located in Gospel Oak in the London Borough of Camden. Constructed in the 1960s and 1970s it replaced the older road layout centred on the circular street of the same name.

Lismore Circus takes its name from the Irish aristocrat Cornelius O'Callaghan, 1st Viscount Lismore who owned the land on which it was built on. In 1855 he envisaged it and the surrounding streets to be a "spacious suburb of semi-detached villas" but the development was slower and less co-ordinated than he had planned. It was structured around a garden square (although circular in shape) and was originally residential. A variety of other roads ran off the circus including Lismore Road, Rockford Street, Lamble Street and Elaine Grove.

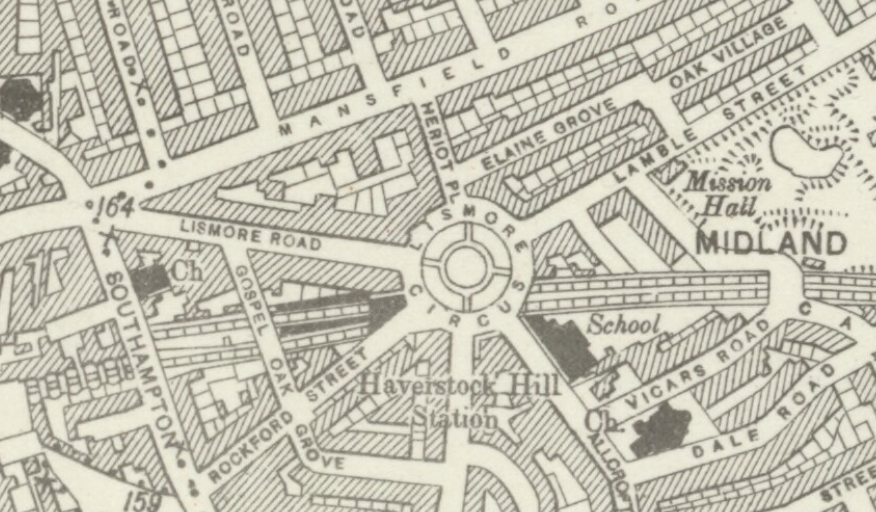
Layout of Lismore Circus in a 1920 Ordnance Survey map.

The Midland Main Line passes underneath the estate and from 1868 until 1916 it was served by Haverstock Hill railway station. The area changed towards the end of the Victorian era to be a busy shopping area

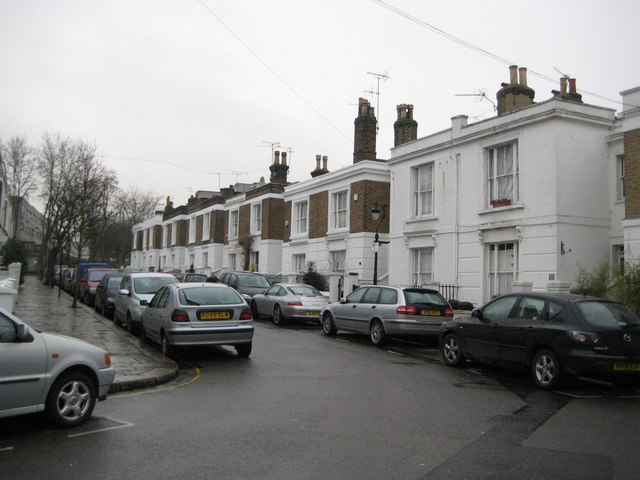
Surviving nineteenth century houses on Elaine Grove.

As part of post-Second World War urban planning the Gospel Oak area was marked down for comprehensive redevelopment. In the original 1962 plan the rebuilt Lismore Circus was to have a shopping centre but the new Camden council abandoned this in 1965. Instead a tower block was chosen to be built. Much of the Victorian streetscape was demolished with only a few stretches surviving including Elaine Grove. The redevelopment was completed in completed in 1981

== Oak Village ==
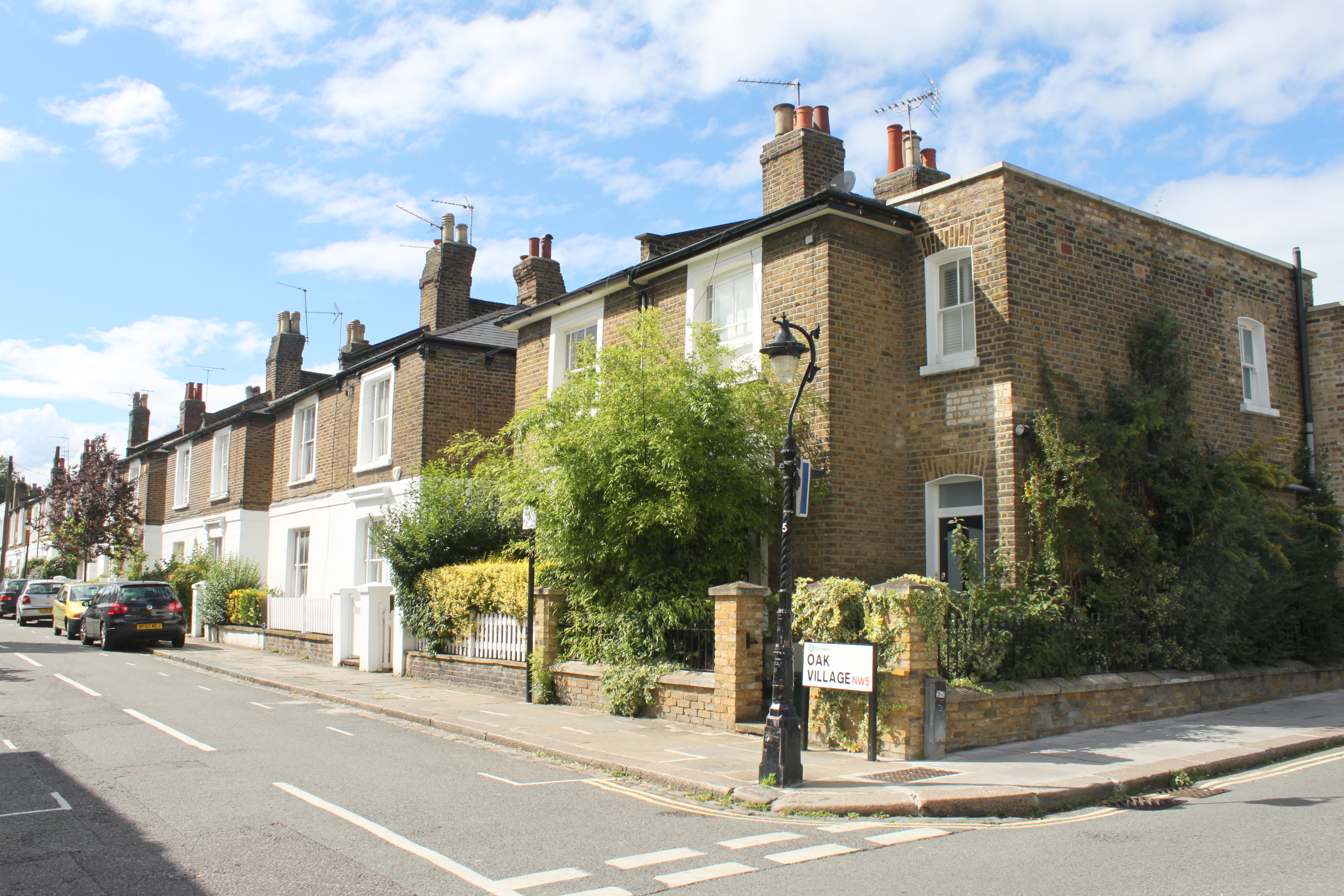
Oak Village.

To the north of Lismore Circus a group of small adjacent residential streets are named Oak Village and numbers as a single entity. It is named due to its proximity to the old Gospel Oak that gave the district its name. Although it was planned to demolish these as part of the redevelopment of Lismore Circus, the residents successfully campaigned to save the roads from destruction. Today Oak Village largely retains its nineteenth century appearance. Oak Village once also included a stretch of properties close to Gospel Oak station including the Old Oak pub but these were later renumbered as part of Mansfield Road.

== Bibliography ==
- Cherry, Bridget & Pevsner, Nikolaus. London 4: North. Yale University Press, 2002.
- Denford, Steven & Hayes, David A. Streets of Gospel Oak and West Kentish Town. Camden History Society, 2006.
