= Gospel Oak =

Area of London, England

Coordinates: 51.55376°N 0.14795°W

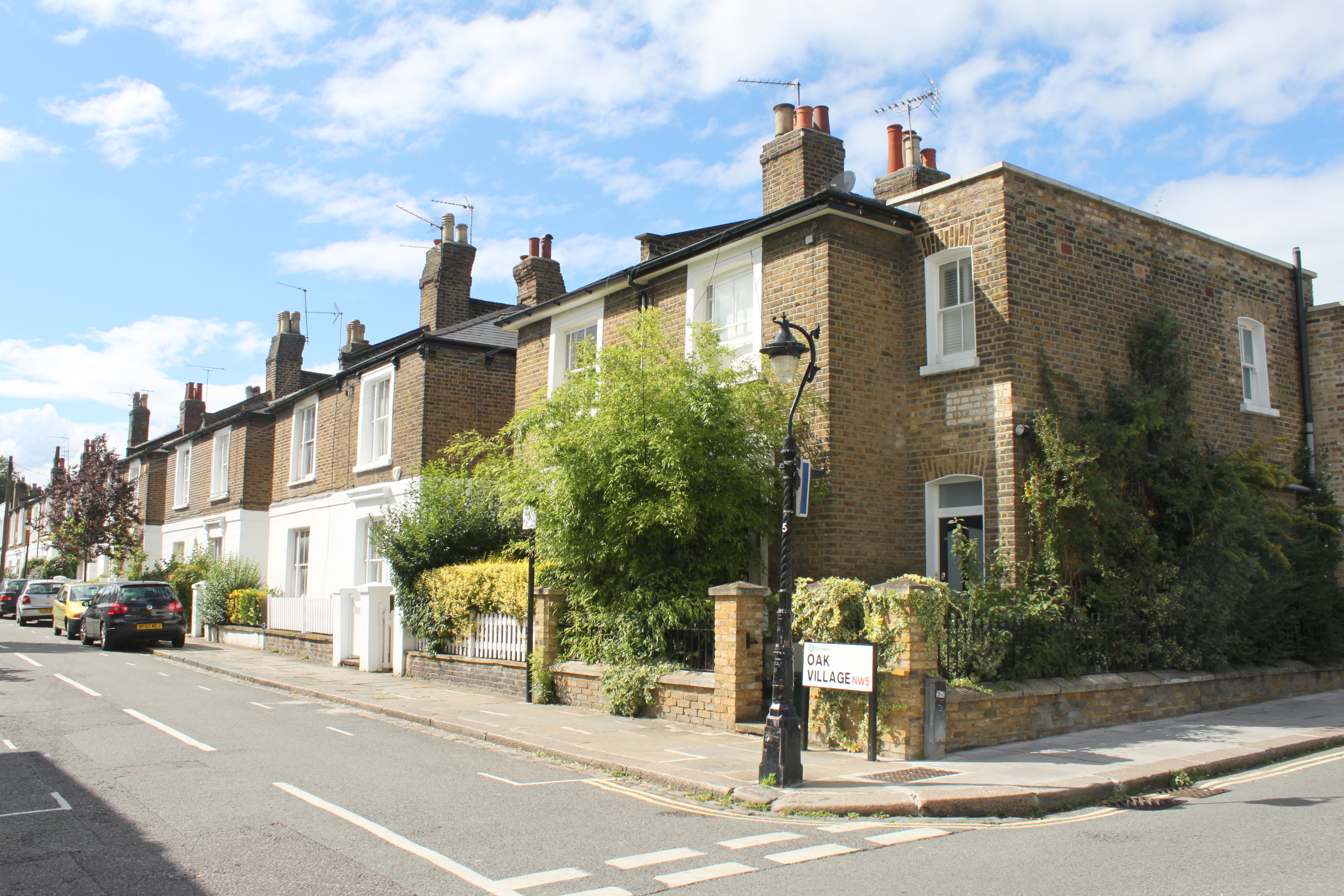

- Location within Greater London
- OS grid reference: TQ285855
- London borough: Camden
- Ceremonial county: Greater London
- Region: London
- Country: England
- Sovereign state: United Kingdom
- Post town: LONDON
- Postcode district: NW3, NW5
- Dialling code: 020
- Police: Metropolitan
- Fire: London
- Ambulance: London
- UK Parliament: Hampstead and Highgate
- London Assembly: Barnet and Camden

Gospel Oak is an area of north west London, England. It is in the London Borough of Camden and at the very south of Hampstead Heath, between Hampstead to the north-west, Dartmouth Park to the north-east, Kentish Town to the south-east, and Belsize Park to the south-west. Gospel Oak lies across the NW5 and NW3 postcodes and is served by Gospel Oak station on the London Overground.

== History ==
The name Gospel Oak is derived from a local oak tree, under which parishioners gathered to hear regular gospel readings when the area was still rural. The oak of Gospel Oak marked the boundary between the parishes of Hampstead and St Pancras, and was said to be situated on the corner of Mansfield Road and Southampton Road. The oak vanished sometime in the 1800s and was last recorded on a map of the area in 1801.

There are reports that the founder of Methodism John Wesley preached from the oak, with the 18th century farming population meeting there regularly. The small street named Wesleyan Place, off Highgate Road, was the original site of a very early Methodist chapel that was connected with the famous oak.

The history of Gospel Oak can be traced as far back as the history of Hampstead, which was documented in AD 986 by Ethelred the Unready to the Abbot of Westminster. Situated as it is in the southern part of Hampstead Heath, the area was, in years past, referred to as nearby South End Green. When the now-lost great oak tree of Gospel Oak became famous as a preaching spot in the 1700s, the area was referred to as Gospel Oak, and the name continues today.

The neighbourhood began serious development in the mid-1800s when Lord Mansfield, Lord Southampton and Lord Lisburne were the local landowners. Plans were drawn up for elegant streets radiating from Lismore Circus but after two railway lines were extended across the area in the 1860s the first buildings were two- and three-story cottages, based around present-day Oak Village. The area was for many years rather remote from the rest of the wider Kentish Town development and streets were not fully completed and the housing stock was regarded as relatively sub-standard.

During this early building period, there was a risk that Parliament Hill Fields (the southernmost part of Hampstead Heath, entered from the ‘Gospel Oak Entrance’ near Gospel Oak station) would be built over. In the 1840s, Lord Southampton's estate initially proposed building on the fields, but a campaign led to the fields being bought in 1889 by the Metropolitan Board of Works as an extension to the already protected Hampstead Heath. The fields now host Parliament Hill itself, the Parliament Hill Lido, an athletics running track, a bandstand, café and various children's play areas.

On the evening of 2 September 1861, an excursion train returning from Kew Gardens hit an empty train on the bridge next to Gospel Oak station. The engine left the line and plunged down the embankment, killing 14 and injuring 300.

A curious story of Victorian Gospel Oak relates to a story that appeared in the local press of the time, called "The Elephants of Gospel Oak". In March 1884, Sangers Circus was booked to perform at Gospel Oak (presumably on Parliament Hill Fields). Four elephants were transported by train to Kentish Town but on leaving the train, two of the elephants bolted and ran up Fortess Road, knocking over a child, running further beyond Tufnell Park station and ending up falling into cellars in Pemberton Gardens. The other two elephants were then drafted to pull out the trapped elephants using ropes. All four elephants then paraded down the streets of Dartmouth Park, accompanied by hundreds of onlookers, arriving back at Gospel Oak where the elephants performed to packed audiences.

Later development including the areas of the Mansfield Conservation area to the west of Gospel Oak station led to the neighbourhood becoming more respectable and solidly residential - although in 1909 when John Betjeman's family moved to the more affluent Highgate they obviously felt that they were a cut above Gospel Oak:

Here from my eyrie, as the sun went down,
I heard the old North London puff and shunt,
Glad that I did not live in Gospel Oak.

Bombing during the 1940s and post-war regeneration affected Gospel Oak considerably. During World War II, the area around Gospel Oak station was bombed, and on the night of 16 November 1940, Mansfield Road School (Gospel Oak Primary School is now on this site) and other parts of Gospel Oak were bombed. The school was acting as a fire station at the time and four local residents died and many more were injured. The present-day school was subsequently built on the site, and the damaged Victorian houses opposite were torn down to make way for the more modern estates that are seen today.

== Topography ==
One of ‘London’s lost rivers’ the River Fleet flows hidden under Gospel Oak, following the line of Fleet Road, and crossing under Southampton Road, Kingsford Road and continuing along the line of Malden Road to eventually meet the Thames.

== Local politics ==
The majority of Gospel Oak forms a ward, called Gospel Oak, on Camden London Borough Council. It was represented by future MP Tessa Jowell (Labour) from 1974 to 1986, businessman John Mills (Labour) from 1990 to 2006, Camden Council Leader Raj Chada (Labour) from 2002 to 2006 and future MP Chris Philp (Conservative) from 2006 to 2010. The southern part of Gospel Oak is included in the Haverstock ward (which also includes areas to the south of Queen's Crescent and south-west to Belsize Park).

For parliamentary purposes, Gospel Oak is part of the wider Holborn and St Pancras constituency, held since 2026 by Labour's Sagal Abdi-Wali.

== Places of interest ==
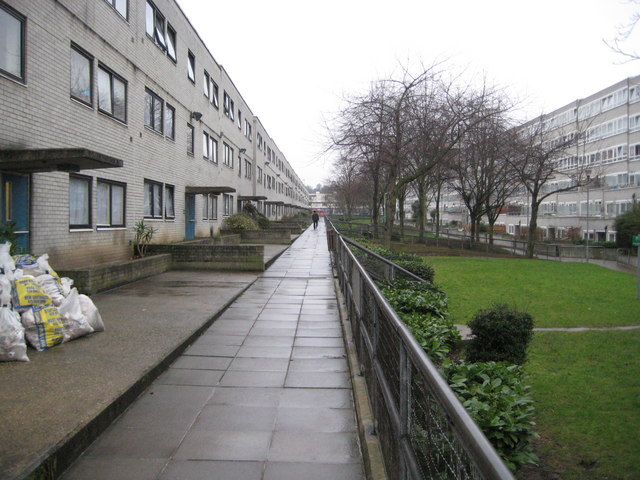
A view of the Lismore Circus Estate, two parallel blocks of continuous housing units dating from the early 1970s.

Residential areas

- Oak Village, and its neighbouring road, Elaine Grove, are some of the prettiest residential parts of Gospel Oak. These streets remain relatively unchanged since the cottages were built in the early Victorian period.
- The Mansfield Conservation area, contained by Roderick, Savernake and Mansfield Roads contains the bulk of Gospel Oak's larger terraced Victorian and Edwardian properties.
- Lissenden Gardens, a mansion flat estate consisting of Parliament Hill Mansions, Lissenden Mansions and Clevedon Mansions, is a popular residential area of Gospel Oak, with its own interesting and diverse history, famous as the birthplace of John Betjeman.
- Kiln Place, an estate in Gospel Oak, was built by Frederick MacManus and partners architects on a former brick kiln, called the ‘Gospel Oak Brick Works’.
- The Dunboyne Road Estate previously known as the Fleet Road Estate is a Grade II-listed modernist estate, designed by Neave Brown in the late 1960s.
- Waxham, a low-rise estate block running along much of Mansfield Road was completed in the 1970s and is said to be the longest single block of public housing in Europe. However, at 850m, the falowiec in Obrońców Wybrzeża Gdansk Poland, is far longer.

Churches

- St Martin's Church, Gospel Oak is a Grade I-listed church on Vicars Road built between 1864 and 66. A curious-looking church designed by Edward Buckton Lamb and discussed by John Summerson in his Victorian Architecture in England (Norton 1970). The church was built at the personal cost of John Derby Allcroft to commemorate his late wife. It is a listed building which architectural historian Nikolaus Pevsner described as "the craziest of London’s Victorian churches".
- St Dominic's Priory Church, a Grade II* listed Victorian church in Gospel Oak, designed in accordance with the Rosary Prayer and administered by friars and nuns - said to be one of the largest Catholic churches in London.
- All Hallows in Savernake Road, Gospel Oak, is a vast hall-style church, designed in the early English Gothic style with aisles as high as the nave. It was described by The Times in 1914 as "the Cathedral of North London" due to its vastness. The architect was James Brooks, originally the Church of the Good Shepherd, its foundation stone was laid by Mary, Duchess of Teck (mother of the future Queen Mary) on 23 July 1892. The church was consecrated in 1901 and eventually dedicated by the Bishop of London in 1914 once all building work was completed by Giles (later Sir Giles) Gilbert Scott.
- The Church of St Anargyre on Gordon House Road is a Greek Orthodox church serving the local Greek and Cypriot communities of Gospel Oak.
- St Marks's Church was one of three London churches paid for by John Derby Allcroft (1822 - 1893).

Leisure and recreation

- The Gospel Oak entrance to Hampstead Heath leads immediately to Parliament Hill Lido, built in 1937 at a cost of £34,000 (the costliest of its type) and is now a popular Grade II listed outdoor swimming pool.
- The southernmost part of Hampstead Heath, accessed from Gospel Oak also contains many other leisure facilities, including an athletics running track, various children's playgrounds, paddling pool, and Hampstead Heath's Education Centre. Wing Chun Kung Fu and other martial arts are on offer at SAS Martial Arts, on Gordon House Road.

Notable shops

- Kristin Baybars’ Toy Emporium, at 7 Mansfield Road, is a Gospel Oak attraction and is famous for beautifully hand-crafted doll's house furniture and old-fashioned toys. Kristin and her shop were the subject of a 2014 short documentary film "This little place in Gospel Oak" as well as a January 2017 BBC video report "My Shop".

Public houses

- The Old Oak is the most central public house in Gospel Oak, which is a 1950s rebuilding of an original corner-sited inn called the Old Oak Hotel built as an integral part of the Oak Village estate in the 1850s.
- The Southampton Arms is a short walk down Highgate Road, winner of CAMRA's 2011 London pub of year.
- The Bull and Last, across Parliament Hill Fields and on the edge of Dartmouth Park, is a historic listed gastropub.

Schools

- Gospel Oak Primary & Nursery School
- Parliament Hill School
- William Ellis School (founded in 1862 as "Gospel Oak Schools")
- Fleet Primary School

== Regeneration ==
Gospel Oak is included in the London Borough of Camden’s Community Investment Programme (CIP), which delivers estate regeneration projects and investment in social housing and local infrastructure. The Gospel Oak and Haverstock schemes form part of this programme.

== Transport ==
=== Trains ===
Gospel Oak is served by the London Overground network, with Gospel Oak station being the start of the Gospel Oak to Barking line as well as an intermediate stop on the North London Line.

Gospel Oak station dates back to 1860. The name of the current Gospel Oak station in Mansfield Road/Gordon House Road has changed over the years. When it first opened in 1860 it was the very first station in the area that took the name ‘Kentish Town’ which it held until 1867 when it was renamed ‘Gospel Oak’ due to other stations taking the Kentish Town name. Given Gospel Oak station's immediate proximity to Parliament Hill (just an 8-minute walk from station to summit), there was a movement in the 1950s to rename Gospel Oak station Parliament Hill station – a proposal which was quashed by local residents.

Kentish Town station situated 1 mile away is served by Thameslink.

=== Tube ===
Gospel Oak sits between the High Barnet and Edgware branches of the Northern line.

The nearest stations are Belsize Park and Kentish Town, Tufnell Park, are all situated within a 1-mile radius.

=== Buses ===
The London Buses route 1 bus runs from Pimlico to Southend Green of Hampstead Heath.

The area is also served by the 88 bus which runs from Clapham Common to Parliament Hill Fields.

Other local bus routes include the 46, 214 and C11.

== Notable residents ==
Past

- John Betjeman, poet
- George Orwell, novelist and journalist
- Richard Henry Tawney, socialist and founding father of the welfare state
- Frederick Tatham, sculptor and painter
- Anthony Green, senior Royal Academician and painter
- Denny Wright, jazz guitarist and composer
- Jerome K Jerome, novelist, editor (lived on site of Bacton Low-Rise)
- Ivor Cutler, poet, musician, entertainer, novelist, broadcaster
- Sinéad O'Connor, singer, songwriter, activist
- Victoria Starmer, solicitor, wife of Keir Starmer

Present

- Michael Palin, comedian, actor, writer and television presenter, has lived in Gospel Oak since the 1960s.
- Alastair Campbell, British political aide and Labour Party strategist
- Fiona Millar, journalist
- Edith Bowman, radio DJ and television presenter
- Sagal Abdi-Wali, politician

== Cultural references ==
- "Parliament Hill Fields" is the title of a famous poem by John Betjeman, born in Gospel Oak. The poem describes a tram journey up Highgate Hill from Kentish Town ending near his home in Parliament Hill mansions, Gospel Oak.
- Gospel Oak is the title of a 1997 EP by Sinéad O'Connor, the cover of which depicts the railway arches of Gospel Oak station.
- Gospel Oak was described in the 1924 John Buchan novel The Three Hostages as "shabby gentility on the very brink of squalor."
- Gospel Oak is the setting of the 1987 television movie Mister Corbett’s Ghost.
- Gospel Oak's St Martin's Church was used in the 1990s as the church for the wedding of Ricky and Bianca in BBC's soap opera EastEnders.
- The Gospel Oak area is featured in the 2006 film Notes on a Scandal, starring Judi Dench and Cate Blanchett.
- The Gospel Oak area was one of the locations for the 2010 Kelis music video "Scream".
- "Journeys from Gospel Oak" is a 1972 folk/rock album by Ian Matthews, former lead singer of Fairport Convention and Matthews Southern Comfort.
