= Deutsche Evangelische Christuskirche =

Coordinates: 51.4997°N 0.1664°W

Deutsche Evangelische Christuskirche (German Christ Church)
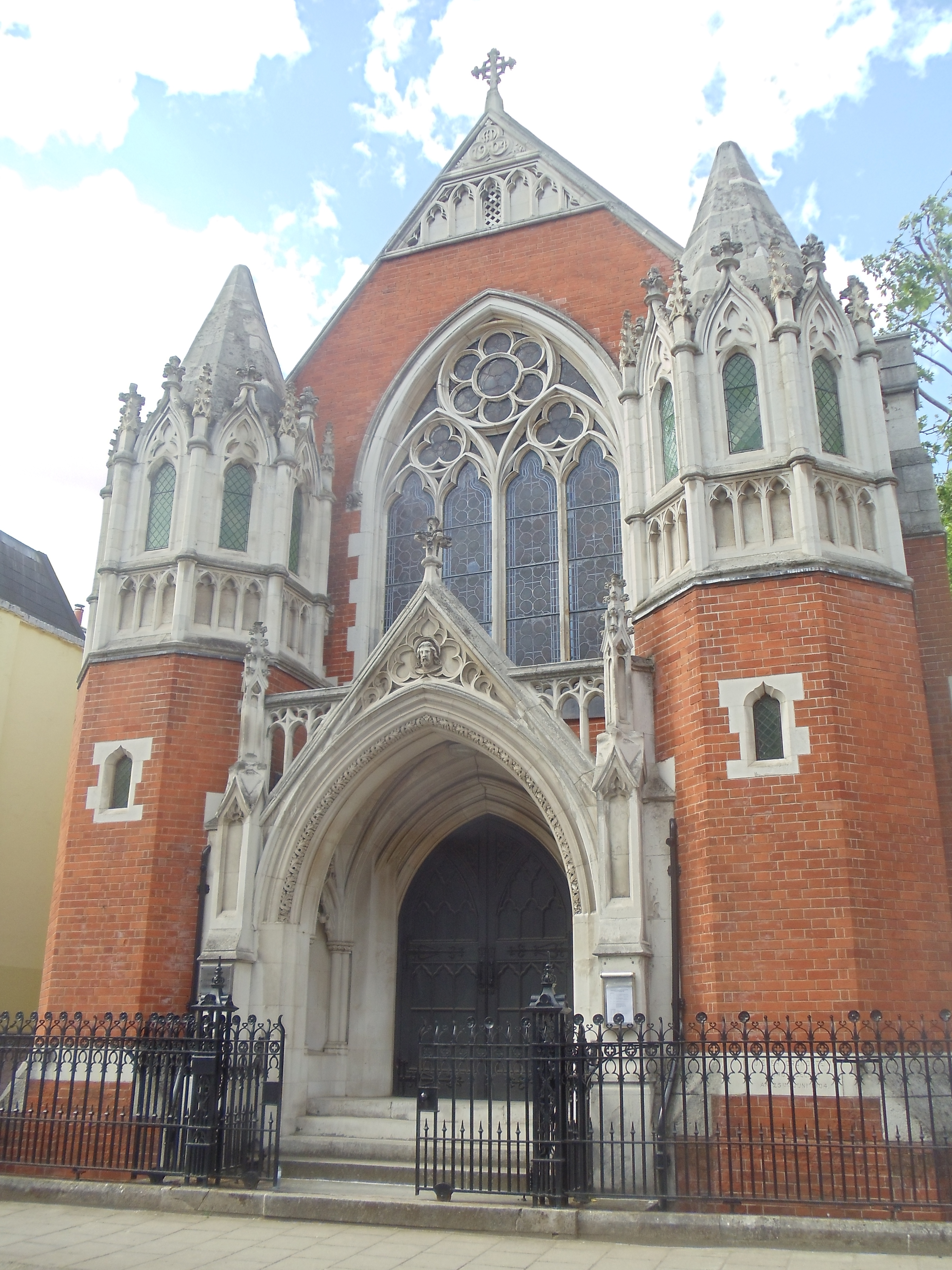
- Deutsche Evangelische Christuskirche (German Christ Church)
- Location: Montpelier Place, Knightsbridge, London
- Country: England
- Denomination: German Protestant Church
- Tradition: Augsburger Confession
- Website: http://www.ev-kirche-london-west.org.uk

History
- Founder: Baron Sir John Henry William Schröder
- Dedicated: 27 November 1904

Architecture
- Architect(s): Edward Boehmer; Charles G. F. Rees
- Completed: 27 November 1904

The Deutsche Evangelische Christuskirche is a church on Montpelier Place in Knightsbridge, London. German Christian theologian Julius Rieger has described it as the most significant German church in London.

== History ==
The church is an offshoot of a congregation, known as the German Chapel Royal, which met at the Savoy Chapel and St James's Palace in Westminster. An earlier German Lutheran congregation had met on the site of Holy Trinity the Less until the 1860s, and latterly at the Hamburg Lutheran Church, alongside the German Hospital in Dalston. From 1901, the Lord Chamberlain's department no longer supported German services at the Chapel Royal, and the congregation relocated to the Eccleston Hall in Victoria.

A dedicated church was funded by Sir John Schroder, 1st Baronet in honour of his late wife, Evelina. In parallel a Deed of Trust was established on 20 December 1904 to ensure the maintenance and the uphold of the building.

The building was designed by the architects Edward Boehmer and Charles G. F. Rees. It was built by Dove Brothers from 1904 to 1905. The stained glass was designed by Franz Xaver Zettler, Ostermann & Hartwein, and Schneiders & Schmolz.

Its dedication on 27 November 1904 was attended by Count Johann Heinrich von Bernstorff, Prince Christian of Schleswig-Holstein, Princess Marie Louise of Schleswig-Holstein, Prince Louis of Battenberg, and Princess Victoria of Hesse and by Rhine.

In May 1946, the German Christian theologian Julius Rieger wrote in a report that this was the most significant German church in London. He added that its congregants were refugees from Nazi Germany for the most part.

== The church today ==
In 2012, the overall structure of the Trust was changed to separate the responsibility for the building and the running of the affairs of the congregations. As a result of this restructuring process, two charities now take responsibility for the congregation as well as for the building.

- THE CONGREGATION AT GERMAN CHRIST CHURCH LONDON Registered as a charity in England and Wales No. 1149991
- THE GERMAN CHRIST CHURCH LONDON CHARITY Registered as a charity in England and Wales No. 251120
