= Hans Henry Konig =

Hans Henry Konig (1870 – 19 October, 1949) was an American banker of German ancestry, who became a naturalised British citizen and was a partner in two British banks in the early twentieth century.

== Early life ==
Hans Konig was born in 1870, the third of three sons of Friedrick Konig (1826-1905) and Alette, daughter of Johannes Houtuyn Cramer. His father had made a fortune from patenting a process for the hardening of rubber. Konig's brother, Frederick, moved to Britain in around 1890 and Hans may have arrived in Britain at the same time. In 1902, Konig became a naturalised British citizen at which time he was resident at 51 South Street, Park Lane, London.

== Career ==
Konig was a partner with his brother Frederick in the banking firm of Konig Brothers in London. In 1923, at the behest of the governor of the Bank of England, the firm merged with Frederick Huth & Company which had been in an increasingly parlous state since the death of Frederick Huth Jackson in 1921. Hans Konig became a partner in the merged firm. According to The London Gazette, Konig spent much of his career resident in France. In 1936, Frederick Huth & Company was transferred to the British Overseas Bank. and it is likely that Hans Konig retired at that time.

== Personal life ==
As far as is known, Konig never married and left no descendants. He was a member of the Carlton Club and the Wellington Club. In 1913 he was resident at Ardenrun, Blindley Heath, Surrey.

== Death ==
Konig died in Bournemouth on 19 October 1949. Probate was granted to his nephew Marcus Louis de Chappuis and a solicitor for effects of £200 in England.

== Arms ==
Coat of arms of Hans Henry Konig

Notes
Granted by the College of Arms on 10th September 1908.
Crest
Issuant from an antique crown Or an oak tree as in the arms between two eagles' wings Argent.
Escutcheon
Or on a mount in base Vert an oak tree Proper on a chief Sable a wolf's mask between two pairs of cramps in saltire of the field.
Motto
Nec Spe Nec Metu

== See also ==
- Nina Campbell
