= Mansfield Road, London =

Street in London, England

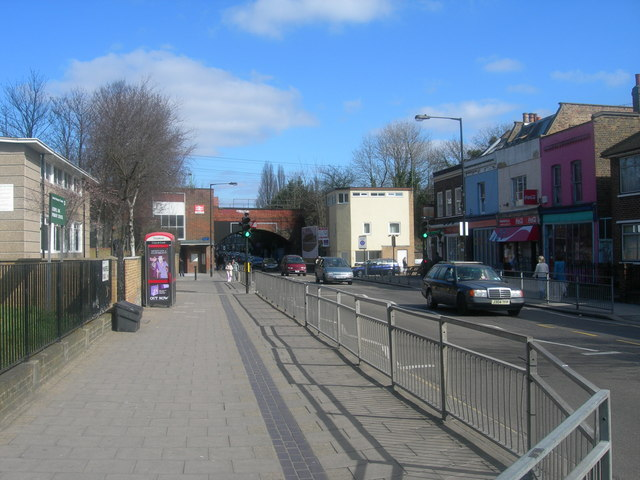
Mansfield Road looking east towards Gospel Oak Station, 2006

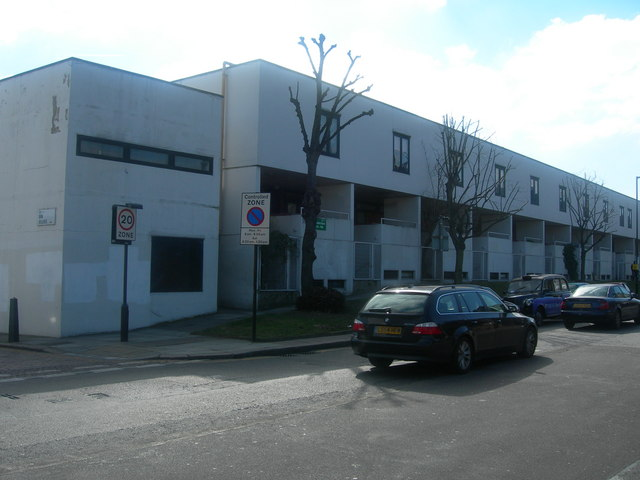
View of the Lismore Circus housing estate.

Mansfield Road is a street in the Gospel Oak. It runs east to west from a junction with Fleet Road and Southampton Road to Gospel Oak Station where it becomes Gordon House Road which runs on as far as the Highgate Road. Today it forms part of the B518 route.

Like Fleet Road to its east it follows a medieval track between South End in Hampstead and Gospel Oak. After Gospel Oak station it continues as Gordon House Road to the junction with Highgate Road, passing the southern edge of Parliament Hill on the way. Lissenden Gardens runs northwards off it.

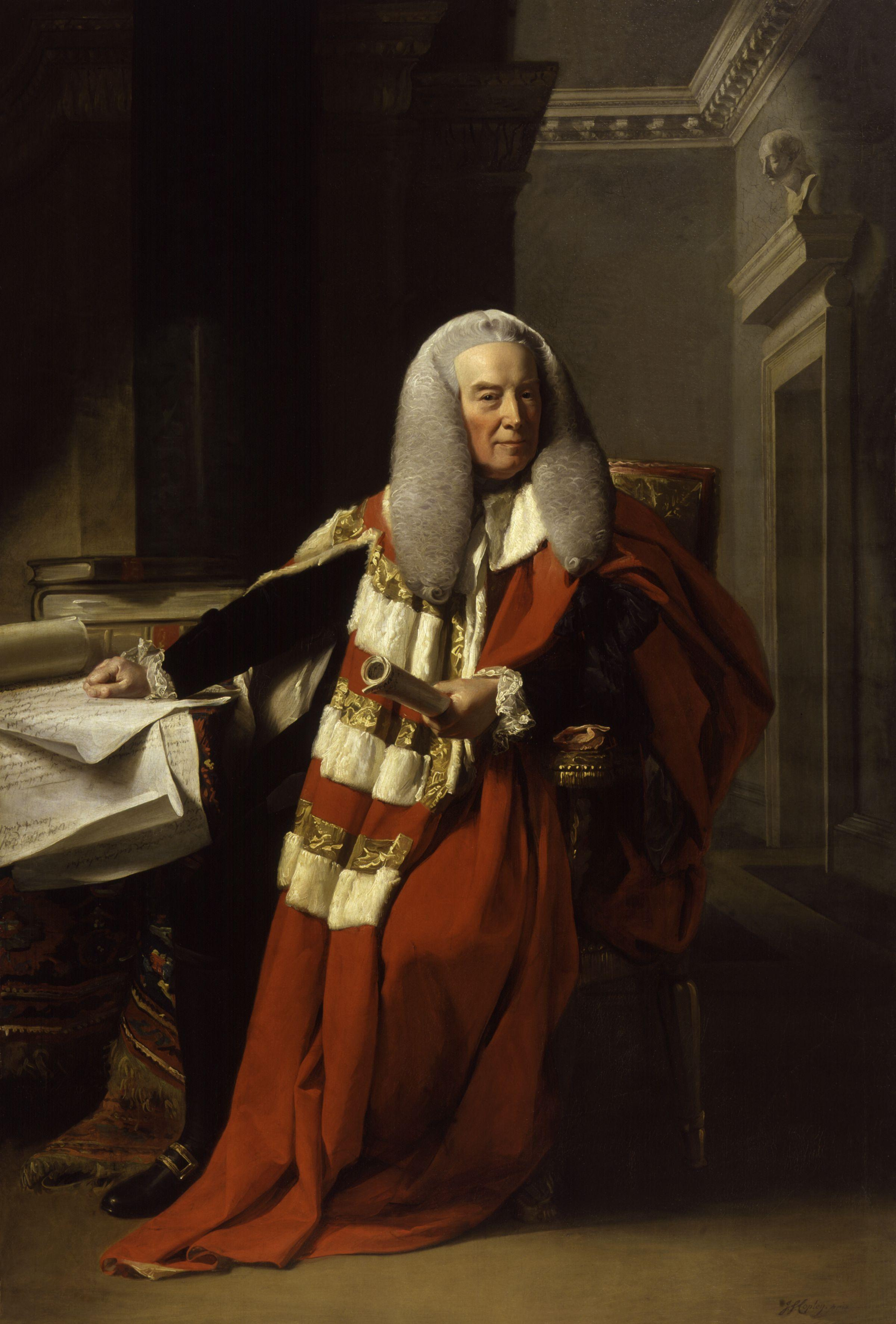
Portrait of Lord Mansfield by John Singleton Copley. An eighteenth century politician, he was the namesake of the street.

The road takes its name from the eighteenth century Lord Chancellor Lord Mansfield, the owner of Kenwood House whose estate stretched as far as the northern side of the road. The street was laid out in 1806. Construction remained haphazard over the following decades until the Victorian era.

The area to the south of Mansfield Road was dramatically redeveloped during the 1960s as the nineteenth century Lismore Circus was replaced with modern buildings. Oak Village and Elaine Grove retain their older Victorian appearance. The Mansfield conservation area covers both the street and those directly north of it built in the late Victorian era, including All Hallows Church.

== Bibliography ==
- Cherry, Bridget & Pevsner, Nikolaus. London 4: North. Yale University Press, 2002.
- Denford, Steven & Hayes, David A. Streets of Gospel Oak and West Kentish Town. Camden History Society, 2006.
