= Haverstock Hill railway station =

Former railway station in England

Coordinates: 51.5524°N 0.1569°W

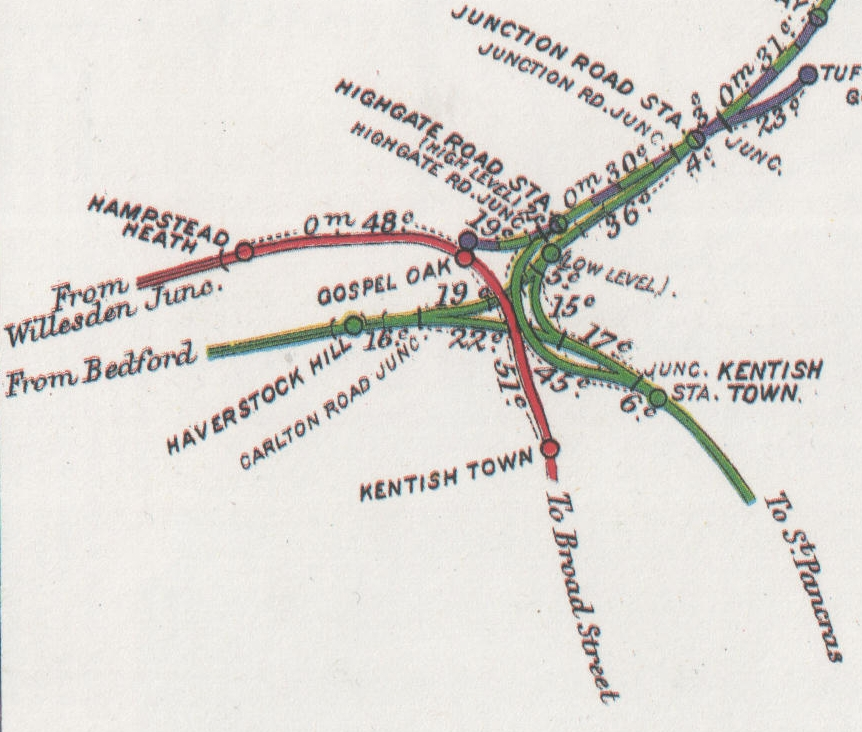
Local railway lines, 1914

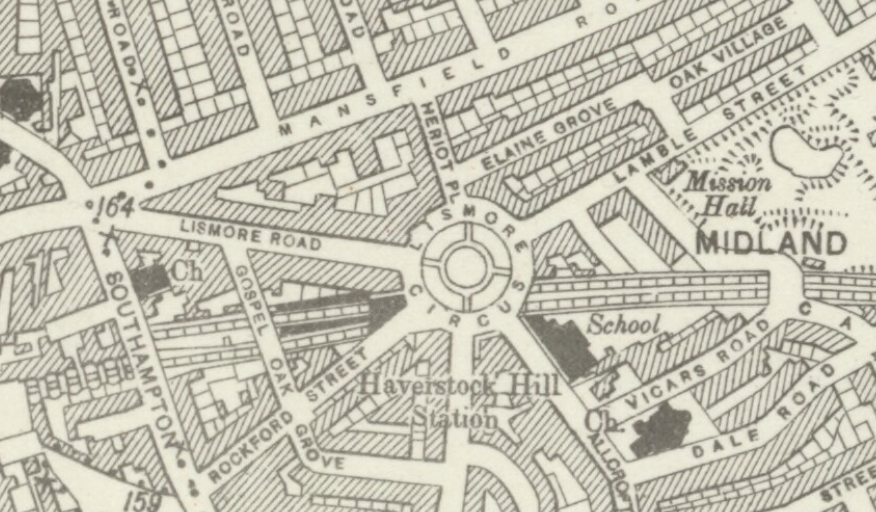
Ordnance Survey map, 1920

Haverstock Hill station

Haverstock Hill railway station was opened by the Midland Railway on 13 July 1868 when it built its extension to St Pancras station. It lay between Belsize Tunnel and Lismore Circus, and served Haverstock Hill, Belsize Park and Gospel Oak, London.

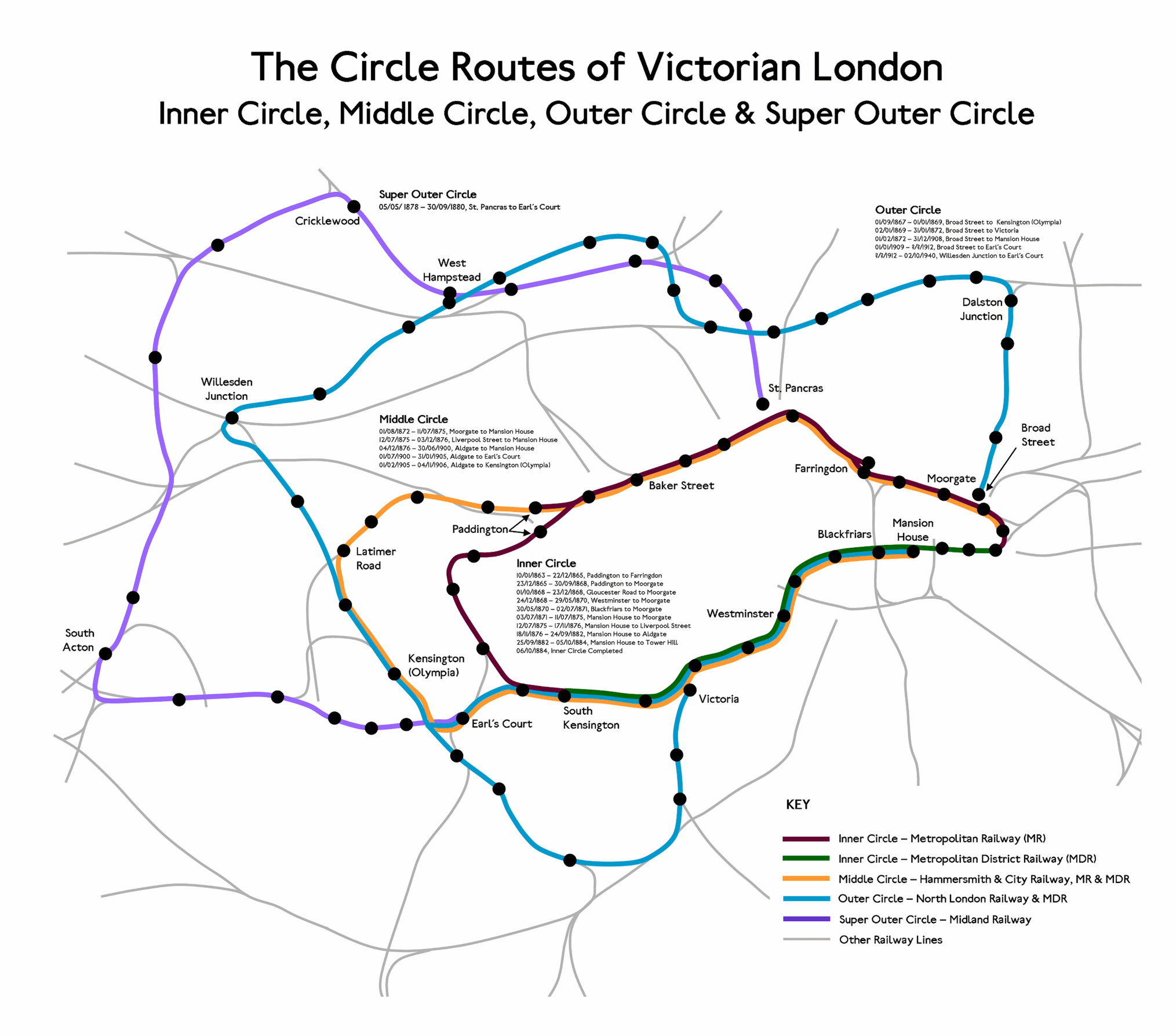
The Victorian Super Outer Circle route, passing through Haverstock Hill station

For a short period between 1878 and 1880, the Midland Railway operated the Super Outer Circle service through the station from St. Pancras to Earl's Court Underground station via tracks through Cricklewood, then using the Dudding Hill Line to South Acton and Hammersmith.

The station was closed on 1 January 1916 as a wartime economy measure, and was not re-opened. The station buildings, which were on the west side of Lismore Circus, remained until the late 1960s when they were demolished. Some remnants of the platforms remain beside the track.

Preceding station	Disused railways	Following station
Finchley Road	Midland Railway	Highgate Road
Finchley Road	Midland Railway; Midland Main Line	Kentish Town
