= Harley House =

Residential building in London

Coordinates: 51.523587°N 0.150164°W

Harley House

Harley House is an Edwardian mansion block development on Marylebone Road in the Marylebone area of London.

== History and description ==
The building was built first in 1905 and named for a house that formerly occupied the site. Designs were provided by Boehmer & Gibbs in a Jacobean or Renaissance Revival style. Their designs were possibly inspired by the nearby Cambridge Gate built by Archer & Green to which Boehmer and Gibbs were assistants; the building's grand facade is similarly fronted with Bath stone. The building also formed a template for the firm's later work in Portland Court.

In 1924, an extension was added by William & Edward Hunt, consisting of twelve flats over six floors. The added section was rendered in a differing style to the original block. Musician Mick Jagger formerly lived in the block.
