= Ernst von Ihne =

German architect

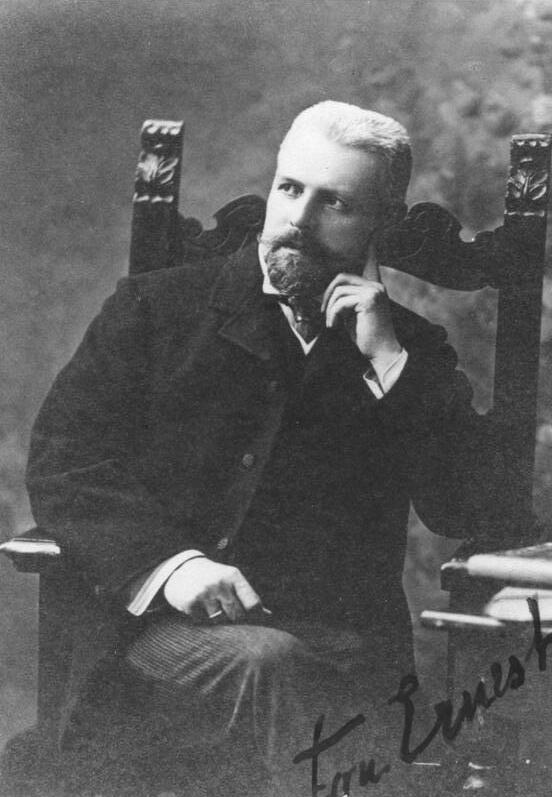
Ernst von Ihne, 1900

Ernst Eberhard von Ihne (23 May 1848 – 21 April 1917) was a German architect. He served as official architect to the German Emperor Frederick III and to his son and successor Wilhelm II. Among his best known works are the Prussian Royal Library building (today House 1 of the Berlin State Library), the Neuer Marstall, and the Kaiser-Friedrich-Museum (today the Bode Museum). He was born in Elberfeld and died in Berlin.

== Gallery ==
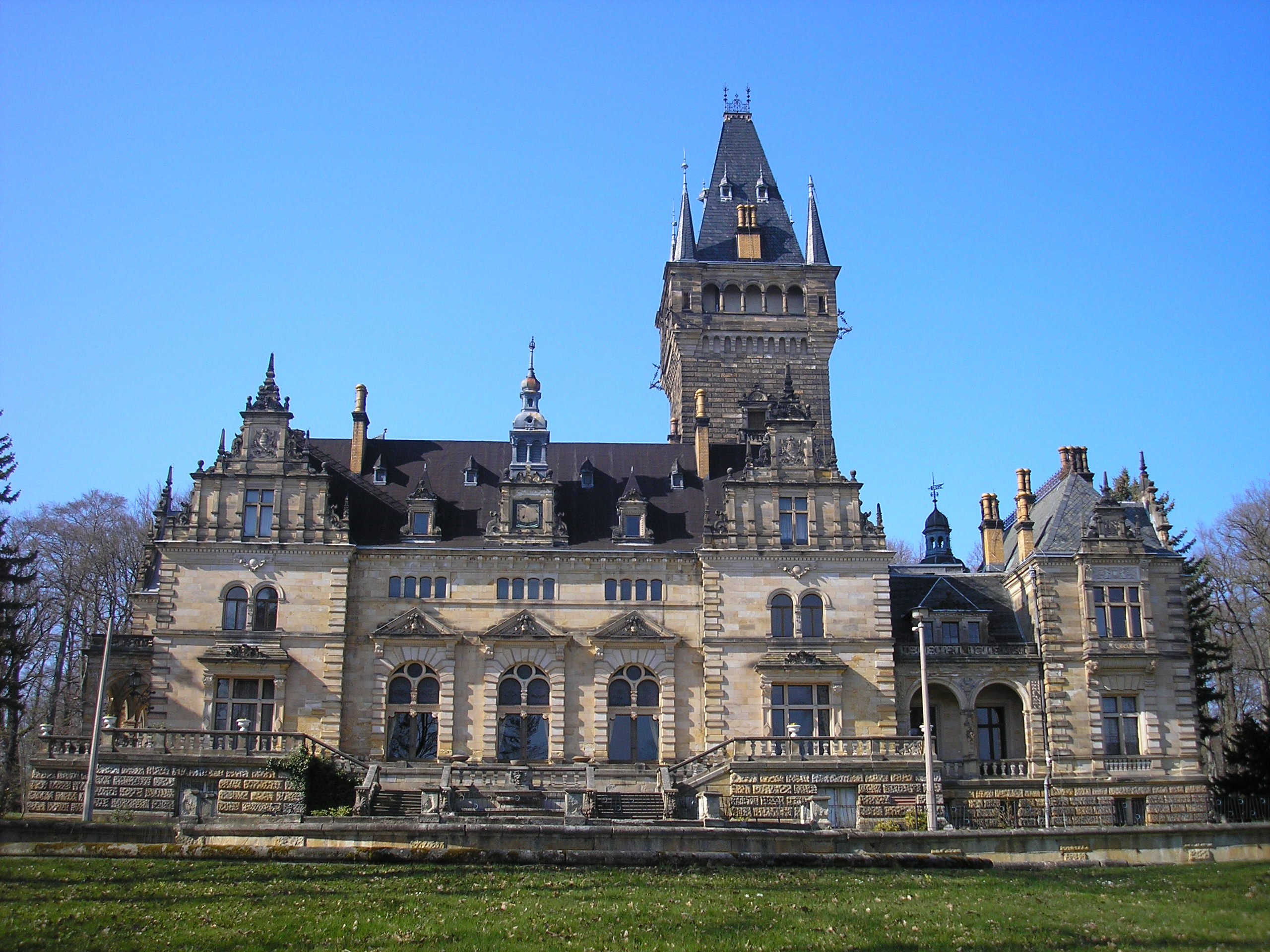
Neues Jagdschloss Hummelshain, Hummelshain (1880–85)

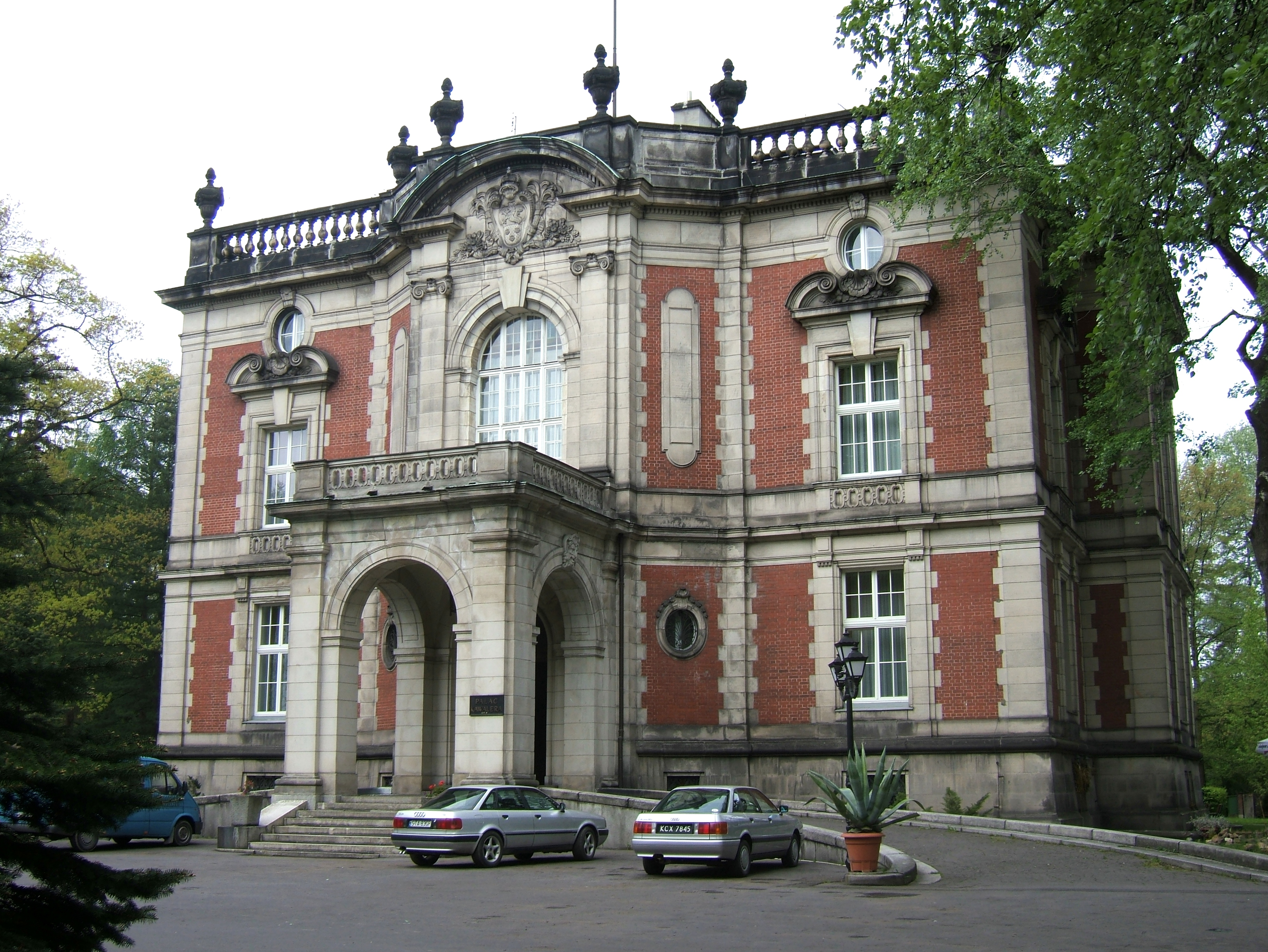
Kawalera Palace, Świerklaniec (1903–1906)

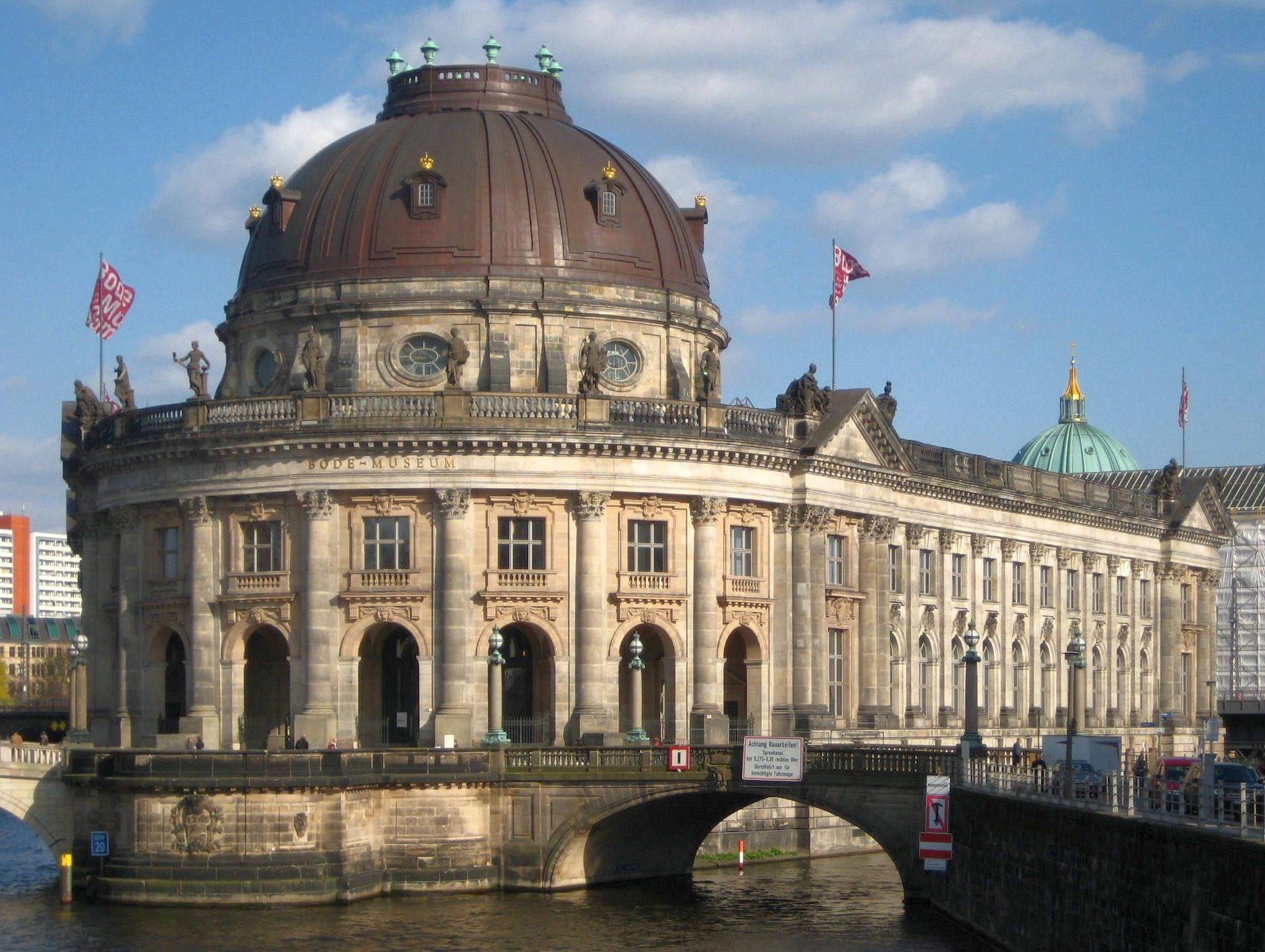
Bode Museum, Berlin (1904)

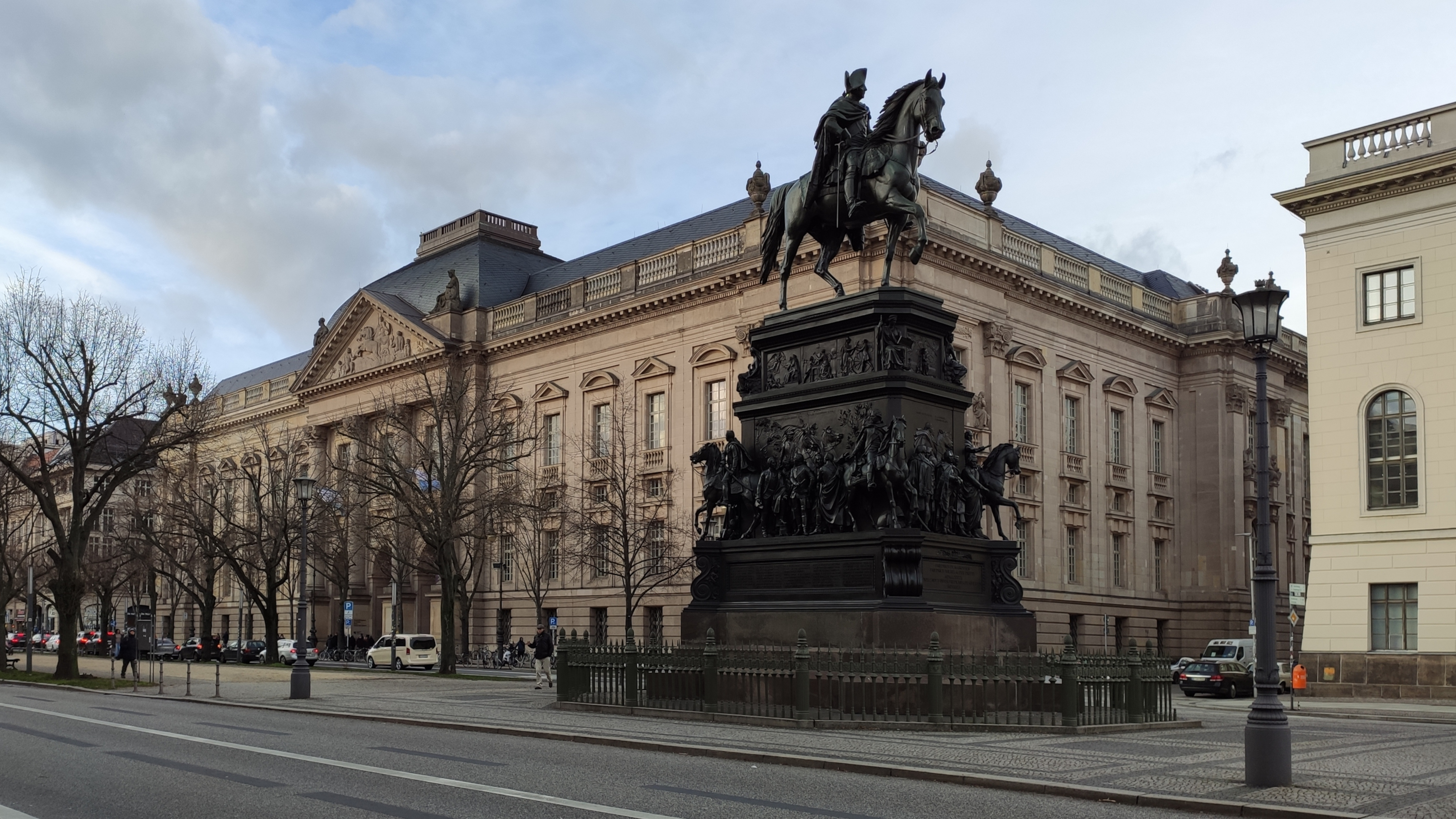
Prussian Royal Library, Berlin

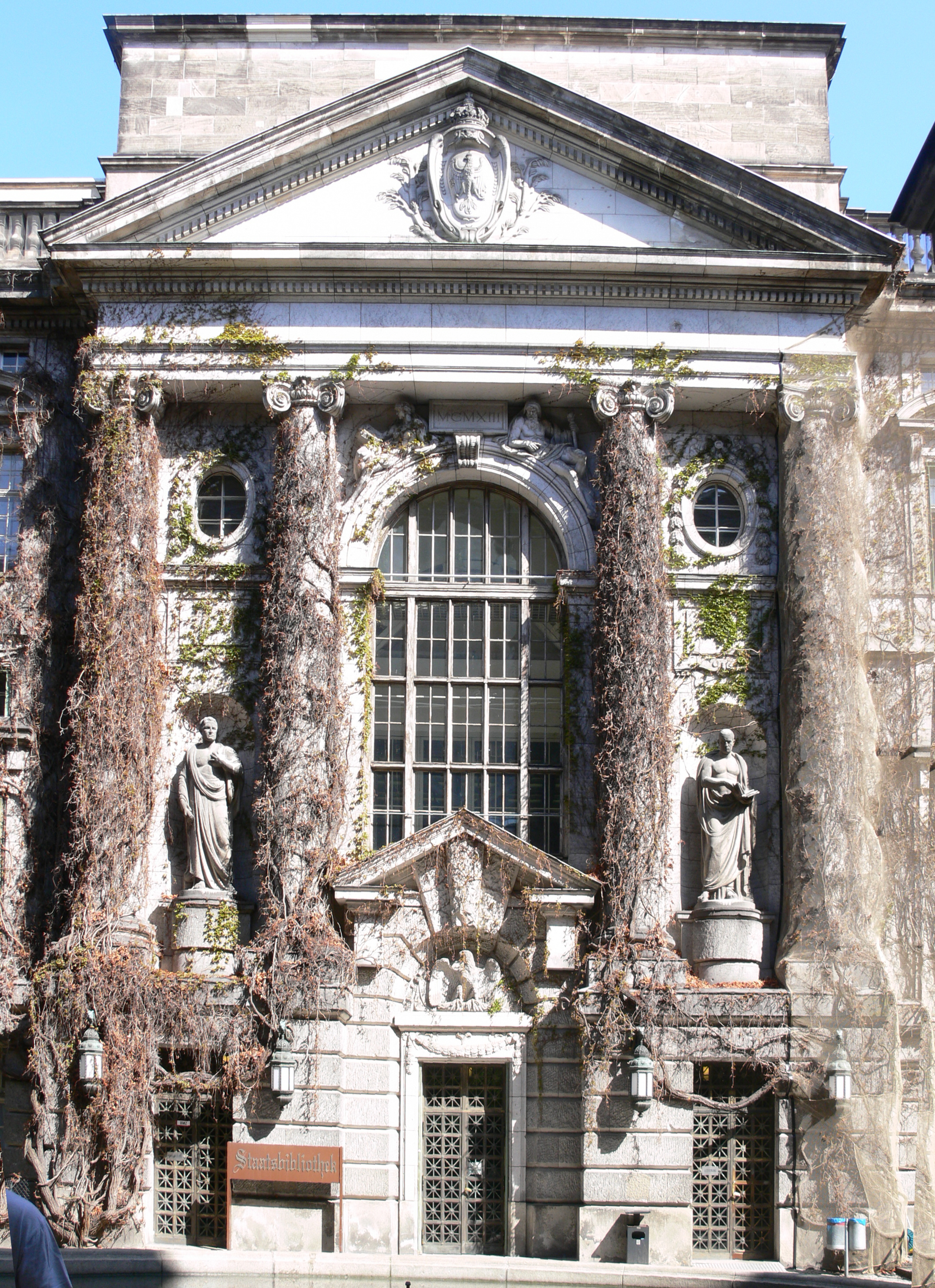
Prussian Royal Library, inner courtyard, Berlin (1914)

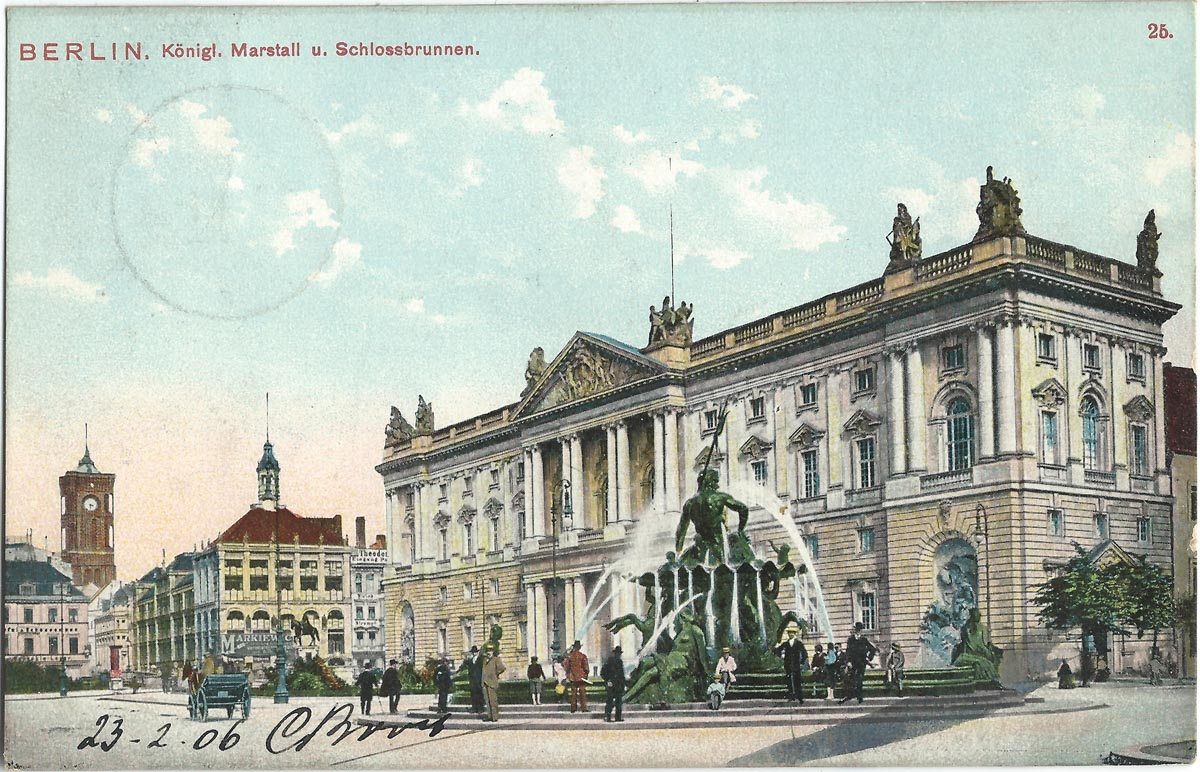
Original facade of the Neuer Marstall
