= Anthony Green (painter) =

British painter (1939–2023)

Anthony Green RA
- Born: Anthony Eric Sandall Green; 30 September 1939; Luton, Bedfordshire, England
- Died: 14 February 2023 (aged 83); Little Eversden, Cambridgeshire, England
- Education: Highgate School, Kyffin Williams; Slade School of Art (1956-60)
- Spouse: Mary Cozens-Walker (m. 1961; died 2020)
- Children: 2
- Parents: Frederick Sandall Green (father); Marie Madeleine Dupont (mother)
- Awards: Harkness Fellowship (1967)
- Elected: London Group (1964); ARA (1971); RA (1977); NEAC (2002); HonRBA; HonROI
- Website: anthonygreen.org.uk

40th Wedding Anniversary II, 2002 – 2004.

Anthony Green RA (30 September 1939 – 14 February 2023) was an English realist painter and printmaker best known for his paintings of his own middle-class domestic life. His works sometimes used compound perspectives and polygonal forms—particularly with large, irregularly shaped canvasses. As well as producing oil paintings, he also produced a number of works designed from the start as limited edition prints, which were typically giclée works.

== Early years ==
Anthony Green was born on 30 September 1939 in Luton, Bedfordshire, and educated at Highgate School, London (where he was taught by Kyffin Williams) and the Slade School of Art (from 1956). Green was interviewed for his place at the Slade by William Coldstream. It was there where he first met lifelong friend and fellow RA Ben Levene, and in 1957 where he met his future wife Mary Cozens-Walker.

In 1960, he moved to Paris and Châteauroux on a scholarship from the Government of France. He returned to England in 1961 and married Cozens-Walker, with whom he had two daughters, Kate and Lucy. His first one-man exhibition was held at the Rowan Gallery in 1962. He taught at the Slade from 1964 until 1967 when he received a Harkness Fellowship and spent two years living in Leonia, New Jersey and Altadena, California.

== Royal Academy of Arts ==
Green's professional life was intertwined with the Royal Academy for more than 50 years. He was elected an Associate Member on 23 April 1971, was elected a full Member on 1 March 1977 and won the Royal Academy Summer Exhibit of the Year in 1977. A retrospective of his work was held at the Royal Academy in 1978.

In 2000, Green was appointed a Trustee of the Royal Academy. In 2003, he was a featured artist at the Royal Academy Summer Exhibition. He was elected a Senior RA in 2014, and in 2017 there was an exhibition of his works entitled 'The Life and Death of Miss Dupont' which was held in the Tennant Gallery at the Royal Academy.

Green twice stood as a candidate for President of the Royal Academy, in 1999 (beaten by the sculptor Phillip King) and 2004 (beaten by the architect Nicholas Grimshaw).

Green exhibited at the Royal Academy of Arts Summer Exhibition every year from 1966 to the last exhibition before he died in 2023.

== Other career highlights ==
In total Green had almost 100 one-man shows worldwide, including a retrospective in Japan in 1987-88. In 1991, he was elected a Fellow of University College London and in 1996 was shortlisted for the Jerwood Painting Prize. Green's work Resurrection, a pictorial sculpture for the Millennium, toured UK cathedrals in 2000. In 2002, he was elected to the New English Art Club.

In 2011, Green was presented with an honorary doctorate by the University of Buckingham, and in 2015 he was created an honorary fellow of Wolfson College, Cambridge.

== Television ==
In 1979, Green was the subject of the BBC Arts programme Arena, in an episode entitled 'Now and Then'.

In 1985, Green appeared as a guest on the Wogan show.

In 1987, Green was the subject of The South Bank Show, in an episode entitled 'Anthony Green RA: A Love Story'. In the show Green, and Cozens-Walker, were interviewed by Melvyn Bragg in the family home in Lissenden Gardens.

In 2017, an edited version of the South Bank Show interview was broadcast as part of 'The South Bank Show Originals' series.

== Death ==
Green died at home in Cambridgeshire, on the morning of 14 February 2023. He was 83.

== Public collections ==
The following public collections contain works by Green:

- Arts Council of Great Britain
- British Council
- Gulbenkian Foundation, Lisbon
- Kelvingrove Art Gallery and Museum, Glasgow
- Metropolitan Museum of Art, New York
- Museum of Fine Arts, Boston
- National Museum of Wales, Cardiff
- National Portrait Gallery, London
- Sainsbury Centre for Visual Arts, University of East Anglia
- Scottish National Gallery of Modern Art (in the Gabrielle Keiller Collection)
- Setagaya Art Museum, Tokyo
- Tate Gallery, London
- Tokyo Metropolitan Art Museum, Japan
- Ulster Museum, Belfast
- Victoria and Albert Museum, London

== Books ==
- Bailey, Martin, ed. A green part of the world: Anthony Green. London: Thames & Hudson, 1984. ISBN 0-500-23397-7.
- Anthony Green 1960–86. Tokyo: The Japan Association of Art Museums / Yomiuri Shinbun, 1987. (No ISBN.) Catalogue of exhibitions held in Niigata, Tokyo, Osaka and Iwaki, 31 October 1987 – 15 May 1988; text in Japanese and English.
- Green, Anthony Anthony Green RA: Flowers, Clouds, Corsets and a Cactus The Richmond Hill Gallery, 2010. ISBN 978-0956473110
- Bailey, Martin, ed. Anthony Green: Painting life. London: Royal Academy of Arts, 2017. ISBN 978-1910350553.
- Beetles, Chris Anthony Green RA Among Royal Academy Artists & Friends Chris Beetles Ltd, 2018 ISBN 978-1905738830
- Davis, Paul E. H. Anthony Green: Printed Life. University of Buckingham Press, 2019. ISBN 978-1912500048.
- Green, Anthony Lockdown Love Letters Chris Beetles Ltd, 2023 ISBN 978-1914906060.
