= Lissenden Gardens =

Street and housing estate in London

Coordinates: 51.55709°N 0.14989°W

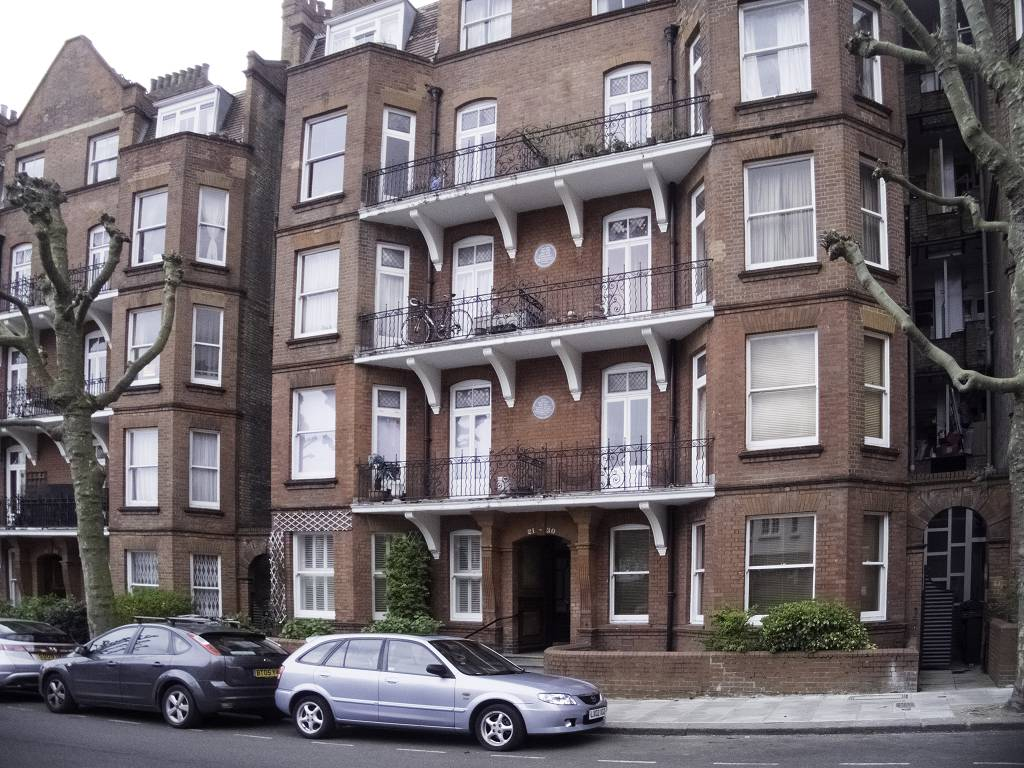
R H Tawney and Haydn Wood plaques on apartments in Lissenden Gardens

Lissenden Gardens is a small inner urban area in north west London in the London Borough of Camden at the very south east of Hampstead Heath.

== History ==
Lissenden Gardens was built between 1898 and 1906 by the Armstrong family. Alfred Armstrong was the son-in-law of E. J. Cave, a prolific speculative builder. Alfred had made his fortune first through selling automatic vending machines, then through generating electricity. He was the first to generate electricity in Hampstead. The estate was designed by Boehmer and Gibbs, the architects who were experienced in building middle class blocks of flats in the Hampstead area and working for Cave. Edward Boehmer was American born but had trained in Germany.

The estate consists of Clevedon Mansions, Lissenden Mansions, and Parliament Hill Mansions built around what was initially a garden but is now a private tennis court. The flats were built in the fashionable Edwardian period Arts and Crafts style, using red brick, with attention to detail such as stained glass above the front doors and some windows as well as in the stair columns; hand-made tapered brick arches over the windows; hand-made red clay tiles; and terracotta foliage panels and flower tiles by the front doors. Wrought iron was used for the railings and weather vanes and cast iron in the fireplaces.

There were service lifts (some hand operated) to raise coal to the upper floors, a speaking tube with a whistle to allow the residents to attract the attention of and then to speak to porters, and rubbish chutes from kitchens to ground-floor collection bins. In autumn 1939, the pacifist and suffragist Mary Sheepshanks moved into an apartment in Parliament Hill Mansions after she was bombed out in her Hampstead home. Her old friend, the Czechoslovak Jewish activist and social worker Marie Schmolka — who helped political refugees and Jewish adults and children in the lead-up to World War II — lived here between 1939 and 1940.

The estate was hit by incendiary bombs in early September 1940 but there were no injuries. On 26 September 1940, a high explosive bomb hit the southern end of Parliament Hill Mansions, destroying 10 apartments served by one staircase (1-10 Parliament Hill Mansions). 13 people were killed, including several children. After the war, the remains of 1-10 Parliament Hill Mansions were replaced by the six-storey Chester Court, built in the utilitarian style by architects Anderson, Forster and Wilcox. The Armstrong family's intention was that residents would be able to move into this block, which has a lift, in old age.

=== Purchase by Camden Council ===
In 1972 the Armstrong family decided to sell the estate through a sealed bid auction. The residents formed a tenants’ association and planned an expert campaign to save the estate. This was a period when many estates were being sold and tenants being persuaded to leave, so that new owners could refurbish them and then sell them to owner occupiers, making a significant profit. The Lissenden Gardens Tenants Association lost the battle to prevent the Armstrongs from selling privately, in spite of devising the Lissenden Formula, a creative proposal for the Camden Council to buy the estate, but to then allow tenants to buy the leases to their flats. The estate was purchased by Gulindell. Their first act was to put up the rents.

The Gulindell plan was thwarted by the tenants' association campaign. The Council prepared plans to serve a compulsory purchase order on the Gardens, and the tenants' association used this fact to dissuade potential purchasers of vacant flats with posters in windows, warning "‘Caveat emptor’ – buyer beware – the estate was the subject of a compulsory purchase order".

Central government refused to approve the compulsory purchase in July 1973, but the council retaliated the same month by serving “dangerous structure” notices on some of the blocks, requiring the owners to carry out urgent repairs. No flats had been sold and an economic crisis was looming. The council persuaded Gulindell to sell. On 6 October 1973, council leader Frank Dobson announced that Camden Council had bought the estate for £2.8 million.

Residents continued to be organised and active after the sale to the council. They successfully resisted a comprehensive modernisation that would have destroyed the community by moving all residents out for a number of years and changed the appearance of the estate. Instead, a much more sensitive programme of work was carried out, managed jointly by the council and residents. Lissenden Gardens today is a diverse community made up of council tenants, owner occupiers, and private renters.

== Notable residents ==
- Alice Zimmern
- Anthony Green
- Haydn Wood
- James Hanley
- John Betjeman
- George Merritt (actor)
- Martin Shaw
- Patricia Roc
- R H Tawney
- Denny Wright

== Location in context ==
The neighbourhood is positioned between Gospel Oak to the west, Dartmouth Park to the east, Kentish Town to the south, and Hampstead Heath to the north. Lissenden Gardens lies across NW5 postcode and is served by Gospel Oak railway station on the London Overground and three local buses, namely 88, C11, 214. A footpath runs from the top of the estate directly onto the heath.

== See also ==
Eileen Armstrong
