= Charles G. F. Rees =

German-born architect, surveyor and estate agent

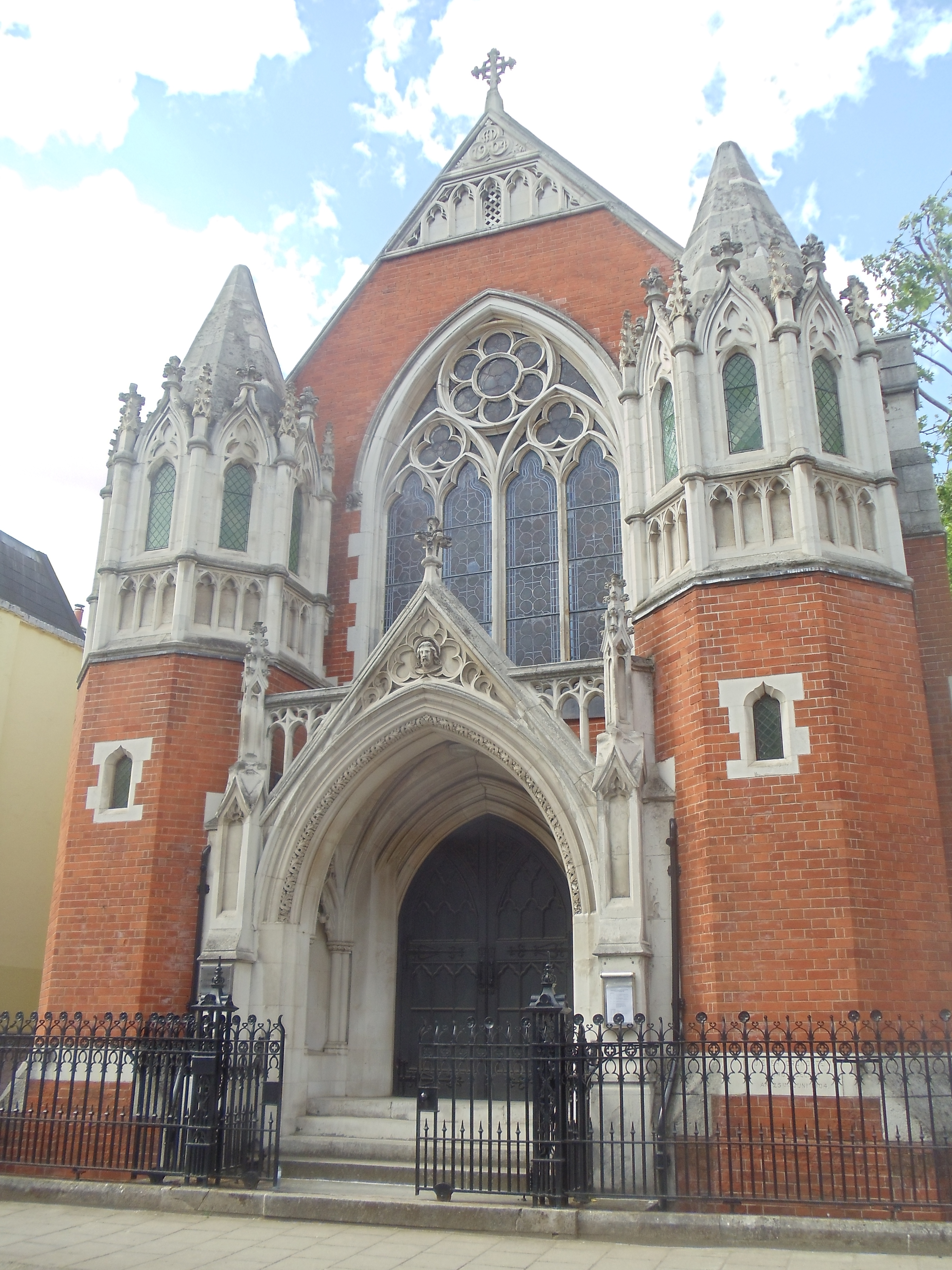
The Deutsche Evangelische Christuskirche, Knightsbridge, London

Charles Gottlob Frederick Rees (born Carl Gottlob Friedrich Rees; 1 February 1855 – 8 May 1931) was a German-born architect, surveyor and estate agent, practicing from Stanmore, Middlesex, England.

== Family ==
Rees was born in Ludwigsburg, Baden-Württemberg, Germany, the son of Albert Ludwig "Louis" Friedrich Rees, a weaver, and Wilhelmina Caroline Rees. In 1880 in Hackney, he married Rees was married to Franziska "Fanny" Pauline Nuding (born c. 1859 in Stuttgart).

== Career ==
With Edward Boehmer, Rees designed the Deutsche Evangelische Christuskirche in Knightsbridge, London. He also carried out extensive works at Tyringham Hall in Buckinghamshire, and designed the Markuskirche in Kelvedon Road, Fulham (1911). He was the surveyor for the German Hospital, Dalston and designing two extensions to that establishment in 1911–12.
