= Ben Levene =

British painter

Ben Levene RA (born Gerald Philip Levene, 23 December 1938 – 15 September 2010) was a British painter. He went to St. Clement Danes School. In 1956, he won a scholarship to the Slade School of Art (where he first met lifelong friend and fellow RA Anthony Green). Later he was awarded the University of London postgraduateship in 1960–61, and then a Boise scholarship in 1961–62. This enabled him to live and work in Spain, accompanied by his first wife, Jane Fogarty, and their daughter Rachel.

He was a visiting lecturer at the Camberwell School of Art from 1963 to 1989. From 1980 to 1995 he was visiting tutor at the Royal Academy Schools, and he was also Visiting Tutor at City & Guilds of London Art School from 1990 to 1995.

He was elected an associate of the Royal Academy in 1975 and a royal academician in 1986. He served as curator of the Royal Academy schools between 1995 and 1998.

Ben Levene died on 15 September 2010. He was survived by his second wife Susan (whom he had married in 1978) and their son, Jacob, and by two daughters, Rachel and Sophie, from his first marriage.

== In public collections ==
The following public collections contain works by Ben Levene:

- Chantrey Bequest
- Government Art Collection
- Guildhall Art Gallery
- Hull Education Centre
- Leicestershire Education Committee
- Paintings in Hospitals, Nuffield Collection
- Rochdale Museum, SIV Fund Purchase
- Southampton Art Gallery, Stott Collection
