= Cambridge Terrace =

Coordinates: 51.5273°N 0.1453°W

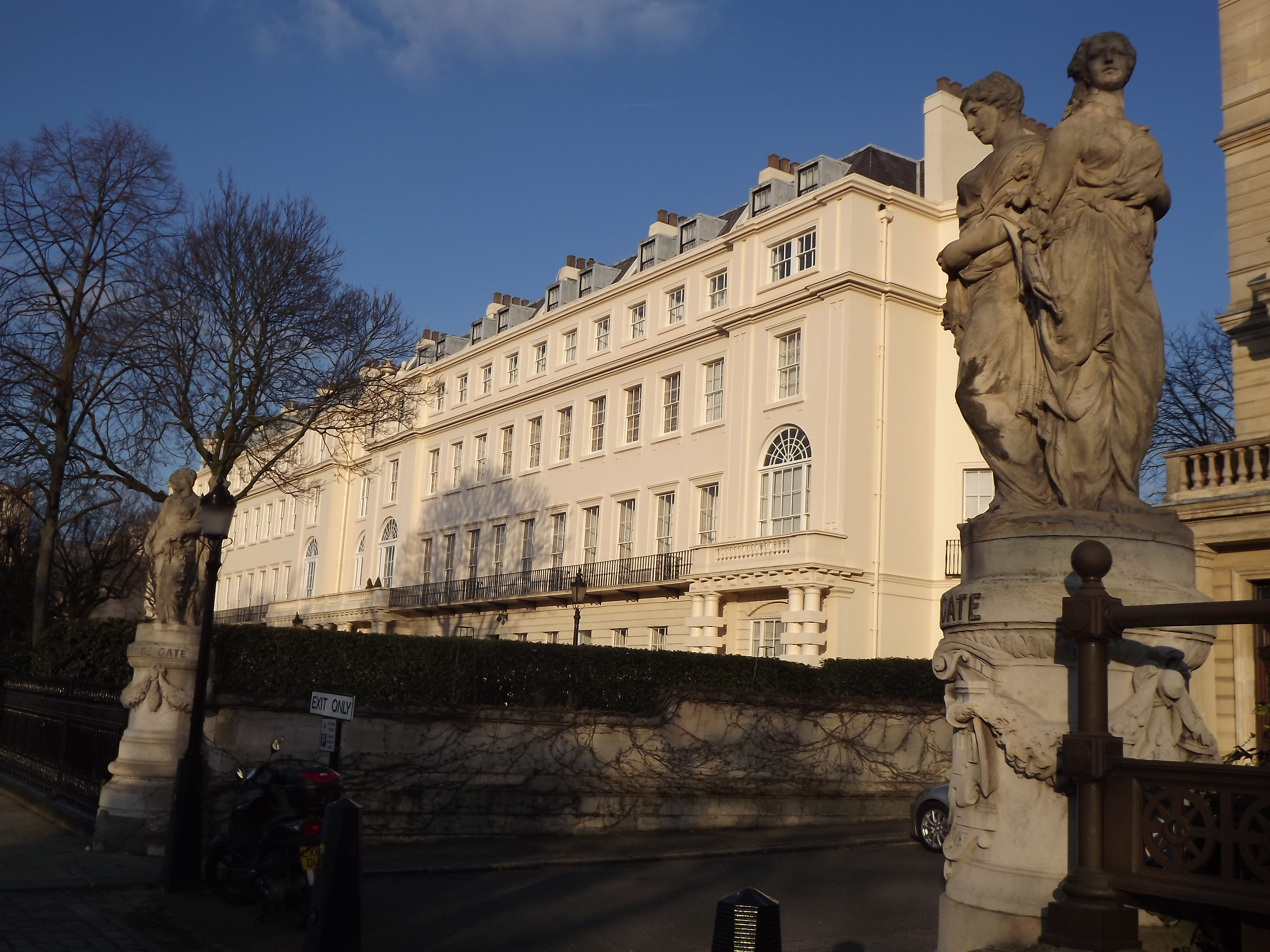
Cambridge Terrace

Cambridge Terrace is a row of consecutive terraced mansions overlooking Regent's Park in the London Borough of Camden, London, England. The terrace has been Grade I listed since 1974.

== History ==
The terrace was designed by John Nash, and completed in 1825. It is named after Prince Adolphus, Duke of Cambridge, the viceroy of Hanover. It is smaller in every respect than its neighbour of Chester Terrace. The centre, and the two wings are distinguished by porticoes of the Roman order or pseudo-Doric order, with rusticated columns. The superstructure, above the porticoes, which are of the height only of the ground story, is plain.

A renewable energy heating and cooling system which burns no fuel on site is being installed in Cambridge Terrace in 2015.
