= The Beatles' 1966 US tour =

1966 concert tour by the Beatles

- Tour by the Beatles
- Cover of the tour programme
- Location: United States, Canada
- Associated album: Yesterday and Today, Revolver
- Start date: 12 August 1966
- End date: 29 August 1966
- No. of shows: 19

The Beatles concert chronology
- 1966 tour of Germany, Japan and the Philippines; 1966 US tour; The Beatles' rooftop concert

The Beatles staged their third and final concert tour of North America in August 1966. It consisted of 19 performances, 17 in the United States and two in Canada. The tour was plagued by backlash regarding the controversy of John Lennon's remark about the Beatles being "more popular than Jesus", death threats, and the band's own dissatisfaction with the noise levels and their ability to perform live. Their speaking out against the Vietnam War added further controversy to the visit.

The band played to large audiences in open-air stadiums throughout the tour, but ticket sales were hindered by the "Jesus" controversy. The US press reported a less frenzied response from the group's fans and speculated on the end of Beatlemania. Having already decided to retire from live performances at the end of the year, the 1966 US tour was the last series of commercial concerts undertaken by the Beatles having performed on 14 tours (11 as the headliner and 3 as a co-headliner) since 1963. Thereafter, they continued as a studio-only band and focused exclusively on record production.

== Background ==
Brian Epstein, the Beatles' manager, announced the band's intention to tour the United States in early March 1966 while in New York. Taking place in August, it was the band's third annual summer tour of the US. The shows formed the second leg of a world tour, following concerts in June and July in West Germany, Japan and the Philippines.

When in Tokyo, the Beatles received death threats and, aside from their professional engagements, were confined to their hotel suite. In Manila, they were manhandled by citizens and military personnel for a perceived slight to Filipino First Lady Imelda Marcos. Believing that their tours had grown too large and complex for Epstein to manage, the band decided to abandon touring following the upcoming US concerts. (Note: Alone among the Beatles, Paul McCartney continued to thrive on live performance. He recalled finally coming around to his bandmates' perspective following the show in St. Louis on 21 August.) When asked what the group planned to do after their ordeal in Manila, George Harrison said: "We're going to have a couple of weeks to recuperate before we go and get beaten up by the Americans."

== Escalation of the "Jesus" controversy ==
Plans for the tour were jeopardised in late July by the reaction to John Lennon's comments that the Beatles had become "more popular than Jesus". Lennon made the remark to Maureen Cleave of the London Evening Standard in February, during his interview for the newspaper's "How Does a Beatle Live?" series. Cleave noted Lennon's interest in Christianity and religions, to which he replied:

Christianity will go. It will vanish and shrink. I needn't argue about that; I'm right and I'll be proved right. We're more popular than Jesus now; I don't know which will go first – rock 'n' roll or Christianity. Jesus was all right but his disciples were thick and ordinary. It's them twisting it that ruins it for me.

His comments caused no concern in the UK nor in the US, initially. On 29 July, however, the US teen magazine Datebook reproduced Cleave's article, with the "I don't know which will go first – rock 'n' roll or Christianity!" remark placed prominently on the cover, provoking outrage among Christian fundamentalists, particularly in the US South. Led by WAQY in Birmingham, Alabama, several radio stations there organised bonfires where listeners were invited to burn their Beatles records and merchandise, and programmers initiated a ban on the band's music.

In an attempt to quell the furore, Epstein flew to New York and gave a press conference on 5 August. The controversy followed that surrounding the butcher cover originally used in June for the Beatles' North American LP Yesterday and Today. Soon withdrawn by Capitol Records, the cover was said to convey the band's opposition to the Vietnam War. The publication of Paul McCartney's comment, from a 1 August radio interview, that Americans were obsessed with money furthered the mood of disquiet surrounding the Beatles. (Note: Datebook had placed another McCartney quote, in which he derided the US as "a lousy country where anyone black is a dirty nigger!", on the cover of the same issue of the magazine, beside Lennon's comment, but this had not provoked a response.) In his press conference, Epstein said that he was prepared to cancel shows if any American promoter wished to back out, but that all the individuals were keen for the tour to go ahead. According to Beatles road manager Neil Aspinall, none of the promoters chose to cancel their events.

Early August was also marked by race riots in Atlanta, Chicago, Minneapolis, Omaha and Philadelphia, and by news of a killing spree in Texas carried out by Charles Whitman, a former US Marine. Derek Taylor, the band's former press officer and a music publicist in California, wrote in his column for Disc and Music Echo that "America is not too settled at the moment and I don't think it is any time for the Beatles to be here." Reporting in London for The Village Voice, Richard Goldstein stated that Revolver, the Beatles' new album, was ubiquitous around the city, as if Londoners were uniting behind the band in response to the bad press emanating from the US. He said there was a "genuine anxiety" among fans for the group's safety and quoted one, a New Yorker, as saying, "If anything happens to them, man, it's World War III." (Note: Goldstein also cited reports from "Austin, Chicago, Newark, New Haven, or wherever the most recent mass-murder has taken place" as other sources of concern.)

== Repertoire and tour personnel ==
Promotional poster for the Toronto concerts

The US shows were in the package-tour format typical of the 1960s. The support acts throughout the tour were the Ronettes, the Cyrkle, Bobby Hebb and the Remains. The latter also served as the backing group for the Ronettes and Hebb.

The Beatles' set lasted around 30 minutes and was almost identical to that performed in their June–July concerts. The sole difference was that "Long Tall Sally" replaced "I'm Down" as the closing number. None of the tracks from Revolver were included due to the difficulty in reproducing their sophisticated studio sounds and arrangements in a concert setting. "Paperback Writer" was therefore the only 1966 recording represented in the set. In the altered release schedules imposed by Capitol for North America, however, "Nowhere Man" and the Yesterday and Today track "If I Needed Someone" were also first issued in 1966, having been part of the December 1965 LP Rubber Soul in other markets.

A handpicked press corps accompanied the Beatles, travelling with the band members and filing reports for their organisations. Among these were British disc jockeys Kenny Everett, Ron O'Quinn and Jerry Leighton; TeenSet editor Judith Sims, representatives from Teen Life magazine and Hearst Newspapers, and Datebook editor Art Unger; and a group of American DJs that included Jim Stagg and George Klein.

== Incidents and further controversy ==
=== Lennon's apology ===
When the band arrived in Chicago on 11 August for the start of the tour, Epstein and press officer Tony Barrow arranged a press conference at the Astor Tower Hotel to address the controversy and for Lennon to explain himself. Lennon stated that he was only commenting on the decline among churchgoers, that he made a mistake in using the Beatles' following in comparison with that of organised religion, and that he "never meant it as a lousy anti-religious thing". Parts of the press conference were broadcast on all the major US television networks and by ITV in the UK.

In a private meeting with Art Unger, Epstein asked him to surrender his press pass for the tour, to avoid accusations that Datebook and the Beatles' management had orchestrated the controversy as a publicity stunt. Unger refused and, in his account, received Lennon's full support when he later discussed the meeting with him.

The apology placated many of those offended by the Datebook article; WAQY called off its Beatle bonfire, planned for 19 August, and some stations lifted their radio bans. The controversy nevertheless hung over the entire tour and overshadowed the US release of Revolver and its accompanying single, "Eleanor Rigby" / "Yellow Submarine". Lennon continued to be asked about the topic in subsequent press conferences, often visibly exasperating not only him, but his bandmates as well.

=== Crowd control ===
The first serious crowd disturbance occurred at Cleveland's Municipal Stadium, where the Beatles performed to nearly 30,000 on 14 August. As they started to play "Day Tripper", over 2,000 fans broke through the security barriers separating the audience from the area housing the elevated stage, causing the Beatles to stop the performance and shelter backstage. Thirty minutes passed before security was restored and the show resumed. Commentators likened the episode to the race riots that had taken place in the east of Cleveland shortly beforehand, and substantial damage was done to the stadium. (Note: In his mid-tour report for Melody Maker, Kenny Everett wrote that a similar fan riot was expected the following day when the Beatles played to around 30,000 at the District of Columbia Stadium in Washington. This was averted through the presence of "almost as many policemen", who vigilantly kept guard inside the large area between the stands and the stage.)

Following their concert at Dodger Stadium in Los Angeles on 28 August, the Beatles were unable to leave the venue for about two hours. Around 100 private security personnel had been assigned to control the crowd of 45,000 fans, 7,000 of whom broke through the fencing and thwarted the band's exit in an armoured van. The Beatles remained trapped in a dressing room until, after two unsuccessful attempts to fool the crowd using decoy vehicles, they were able to escape with assistance from the local police. Some fans were injured and others arrested in clashes with the police.

=== Memphis stopover ===
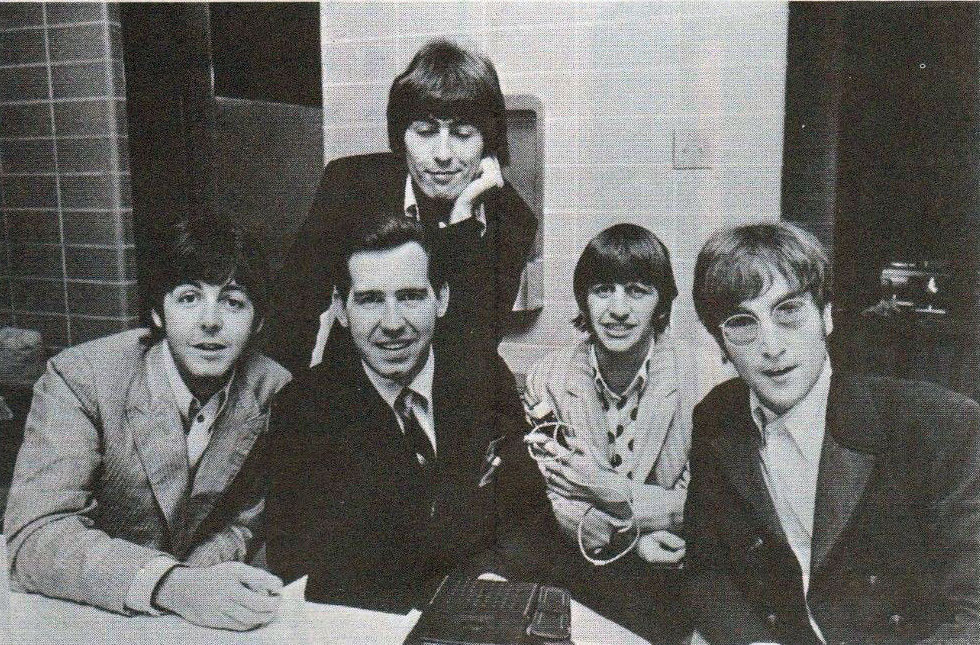
The Beatles, with disc jockey Jim Stagg (front row, second from left), in August 1966. Stagg was part of the press corps attached to the tour, reporting for WCFL Chicago.

The tour's only stopover in the Bible Belt was Memphis, Tennessee, where two shows were scheduled at the Mid-South Coliseum for 19 August. The city council there voted to cancel the afternoon and evening concerts rather than have "municipal facilities be used as a forum to ridicule anyone's religion". The Ku Klux Klan nailed a Beatles LP to a wooden cross, vowing "vengeance", and conservative groups staged further public burnings of Beatles records. Epstein nevertheless went ahead with the shows, which were preceded by further threats to the group. Members of the Ku Klux Klan demonstrated outside the venue on 19 August, and around 8,000 locals took part in an anti-Beatles rally elsewhere in the city.

Although no problems took place during the afternoon show, an audience member threw a lit firecracker onstage that did not hit any of the members, but the band believed that somebody had tried to shoot them. When the firecracker went off, Barrow recalled that "everybody, all of us at the side of the stage, including the three Beatles on stage, all looked immediately at John Lennon. We would not at that moment have been surprised to see that guy go down. John had half-heartedly joked about the Memphis concert in an earlier press conference, and when we got there everything seemed to be controlled and calm, but underneath somehow, there was this nasty atmosphere. It was a very tense and pressured kind of day."

=== Opposition to Vietnam War ===
Lennon and Harrison had warned Epstein that they were no longer prepared to stay silent about pressing political issues such as the Vietnam War. The controversy surrounding Lennon's "Jesus" remarks reinforced their determination to speak out and furthered the Beatles' standing in the emerging counterculture. At the time, 90 per cent of Americans still supported their country's involvement in the conflict.

Having first voiced the group's opposition to the Vietnam War during their stay in Tokyo, Lennon caused further controversy during the band's press conference in Toronto on 17 August when he stated his support for American draft-dodgers escaping to Canada. When the band arrived in New York on 22 August, Lennon again criticised US participation in the war. Harrison denounced war in general, and Lennon stated that all four Beatles felt US involvement in Vietnam was "wrong". At Shea Stadium the following day, the pre-show press conference descended into an argument between members of the media over the Beatles' opposition to the war.

== Final concert ==
Candlestick Park, the last stop of the tour

The Beatles' final paid concert of their career took place on 29 August 1966 at Candlestick Park in San Francisco, California. The band played to an audience of 25,000, leaving 7,000 tickets unsold. A local company called Tempo Productions was in charge of the arrangements. Due to the reduced ticket sales and the expense of paying the Beatles their prearranged $50,000 performance fee, in addition to having to hire an orchestra to satisfy the local musicians union, the concert resulted in a loss for the company. At 9:27 pm, the Beatles took the stage and proceeded to play their eleven-song set.

McCune Sound Services of San Francisco provided the sound system for the concert. The company's log-book entry for the job includes the note: "Bring everything you can find!" Mort Field, who mixed the sound from a dugout at the venue, recalled that the Beatles were unconcerned about sound quality. At one point, Ringo Starr sang into the counterweight of the boom stand microphone set up at his drum kit, rather than the microphone itself.

Knowing that this would be their last concert, members of the band took measures of their own to capture their last moments on stage. Each brought a camera and McCartney asked Barrow to make a rough audio tape recording from the field. The recording of this final concert is now widely circulated on bootlegs. "Long Tall Sally" on the bootlegs is not complete, due to Barrow not flipping the tape over during the show. Barrow gave the original tape of the Candlestick Park concert to McCartney. He also made a single copy, which was kept in a locked drawer in Barrow's office desk.

After the show, the Beatles were quickly taken to the airport in an armoured car. They flew from San Francisco to Los Angeles, arriving at 12:50 am. During the flight, Harrison was heard to say: "That's it, then. I'm not a Beatle anymore." The first band member to tire of Beatlemania, Harrison later said of the group's decision to quit touring: "We'd been through every race riot, and every city we went to there was some kind of a jam going on, and police control, and people threatening to do this and that ... and [us] being confined to a little room or a plane or a car. We all had each other to dilute the stress, and the sense of humour was very important ... But there was a point where enough was enough."

Author Jonathan Gould comments on the significance of the Beatles ending their careers as live performers in San Francisco, since the city was the location for the first Human Be-In in January 1967. This and similar events were sponsored by the Family Dog collective, whose vision was to make San Francisco "America's Liverpool".

== Reception ==
Typically of the era, newspaper coverage of the concerts focused on the size of the audiences, the volume of the fans' screams, and box office takings, rather than attempting to review each event or discuss the music. Throughout the tour, the US press seized on the opportunity to predict the end of Beatlemania and remarked on the absence of the usual crowds of screaming fans at the airports on their itinerary. The high-pitched screaming synonymous with Beatlemania was reduced, but most of the shows were still marked by wild crowd behaviour. In their comments during the tour, Lennon and Harrison each said that their American audiences included more young males than before, a development that Harrison welcomed as a reason for the reduced screaming and attributed to the band's musical growth on Rubber Soul and Revolver. The Beatles' ability to appeal to both sexes in this way helped codify a new youth movement in the US, which sought expression in student demonstrations at Berkeley from late 1966 onwards.

The tour was affected by the prevailing mood of controversy and there were rows of empty seats at some venues. The Beatles held a second successful concert at New York's Shea Stadium, following the world-record attendance they set there in August 1965, although ticket sales were down to 45,000, around 10,000 below the previous year. Author Nicholas Schaffner later wrote that although the numbers at Shea fell short of the 1965 total, the Beatles' ability to sell as many tickets as they did in 1966 was still "a feat nobody else at the time could have come near to duplicating". (Note: In a radio interview he gave in Philadelphia on 16 August, McCartney commented that audience sizes had only diminished relative to the band's own record-breaking achievements, and that the Beatles were still performing to larger crowds than any other act.)

On 28 August, the day of the band's penultimate concert, Epstein issued a press release in response to claims that some of the shows had been poorly attended:

This tour compares phenomenally well with last year's. It's much better all round this year, from the point of view of increased interest and we are actually playing to bigger audiences. Here in Los Angeles, for example, 36,000 people saw the Beatles at the Hollywood Bowl [in August 1965]. Today's concert at Dodger Stadium is attracting 10,000 more. People have been saying things about diminishing popularity, but all one can go by is attendances, which are absolutely huge. By the time we leave, 400,000 people will have seen this series of shows ...

== Set list ==
Lasting around 30 minutes, the Beatles' set list for the tour was as follows (lead singers appear in parentheses):

1. "Rock and Roll Music" (John Lennon)
2. "She's a Woman" (Paul McCartney)
3. "If I Needed Someone" (George Harrison)
4. "Day Tripper" (Lennon and McCartney)
5. "Baby's in Black" (Lennon and McCartney)
6. "I Feel Fine" (Lennon)
7. "Yesterday" (McCartney)
8. "I Wanna Be Your Man" (Ringo Starr)
9. "Nowhere Man" (Lennon with McCartney and Harrison)
10. "Paperback Writer" (McCartney)
11. "Long Tall Sally" (McCartney)

== Tour dates ==
List of tour dates with date, city, country, venue
Date (1966)	City	Country	Venue
12 August (2 shows)	Chicago	United States	International Amphitheatre
13 August (2 shows)	Detroit	United States	Olympia Stadium
14 August	Cleveland	United States	Cleveland Municipal Stadium
15 August	Washington, D.C.	United States	District of Columbia Stadium
16 August	Philadelphia	United States	John F. Kennedy Stadium
17 August (2 shows)	Toronto	Canada	Maple Leaf Gardens
18 August	Boston	United States	Suffolk Downs Racetrack
19 August (2 shows)	Memphis	United States	Mid-South Coliseum
21 August (Note: The Cincinnati show had been scheduled for 20 August but was postponed due to rain.)	Cincinnati	United States	Crosley Field
21 August	St. Louis	United States	Busch Memorial Stadium
23 August	New York City	United States	Shea Stadium
25 August (2 shows)	Seattle	United States	Seattle Center Coliseum
28 August	Los Angeles	United States	Dodger Stadium
29 August	San Francisco	United States	Candlestick Park

== See also ==
- List of the Beatles' live performances
