= Religious views of the Beatles =

The religious views of the English rock band the Beatles evolved over time and differed among members John Lennon, Paul McCartney, George Harrison, and Ringo Starr.

Although all four Beatles were raised either Protestant (Lennon and Starr) or Roman Catholic (Harrison and McCartney), a 1964 interview with band publicist Derek Taylor implied they had all abandoned their religious upbringings.

In 1965, while filming for Help! in the Bahamas, guru Vishnudevananda Saraswati approached the group and gave each member a copy of his book The Complete Illustrated Book of Yoga. This incident is widely seen as the beginning of the band's connection to Indian religion, although authors such as Ajoy Bose have expressed doubts that the Beatles "paid [Saraswati] much attention." But by 1966, Harrison and Lennon's experiences with LSD had sparked an interest in philosophy and spiritualism. This interest would manifest in songs such as "Tomorrow Never Knows," "Within You Without You" and "The Inner Light."

In March 1966, Lennon remarked to a journalist from the Evening Standard that the Beatles had become "more popular than Jesus". The comment went unnoticed until, in August of the same year, the American magazine Datebook republished it, inciting protests against the Beatles by American Christians and religious groups. The band was threatened, their records were publicly burned, and some radio stations refused to play their songs.

After the Beatles' 1966 US tour, Harrison broadened his interest in Indian culture to include Hinduism. He and his then wife Pattie Boyd went on a pilgrimage to Mumbai to meet gurus. In 1968, all four Beatles went to Rishikesh in northern India to study meditation with the Maharishi Mahesh Yogi. Although the Beatles did not continue their relationship with the Maharishi, Harrison became involved in the Hare Krishna tradition and remained involved until his death in 2001.

After the break-up of the Beatles in 1970, Lennon continued to approach religion critically. A song on his first post-Beatles album defines "God" as "a concept by which we measure our pain". His 1971 single "Imagine" suggests that religious belief can be divisive and that an obsessive concern with heaven can prevent us from living fully in the moment. In 2010, Starr said he had recently returned to monotheism, while McCartney, in 2012, said he has a "personal faith in something good, but it doesn't really go much further than that".

== Background ==
McCartney and Harrison were both baptised as Roman Catholics during childhood, although McCartney was raised non-denominationally; his mother was Roman Catholic and his father was a Protestant turned agnostic. Harrison was raised Roman Catholic.

Lennon attended St Peter's Anglican church in Woolton, South Liverpool, where he was a member of the youth group and sang occasionally in the choir.

Starr attended an Evangelical Anglican church during his childhood.

== The Beatles years ==
According to the band's press officer, Derek Taylor, all four Beatles had abandoned their religious upbringings by 1964. In an interview for The Saturday Evening Post, in August of that year, he stated that the Beatles were "completely anti-Christ. I mean, I am anti-Christ as well, but they're so anti-Christ they shock me which isn't an easy thing."

In February 1965, the band gave an interview to Playboy magazine, in which they defended themselves against claims that they were anti-religious, and described themselves as being 'more agnostic than atheistic'.

McCartney: "We probably seem antireligious because of the fact that none of us believe in God."
Lennon: "If you say you don't believe in God, everybody assumes you're antireligious, and you probably think that's what we mean by that. We're not quite sure 'what' we are, but I know that we're more agnostic than atheistic."
Playboy: "Are you speaking for the group, or just for yourself?"
Lennon: "For the group."
Harrison: "John's our official religious spokesman."
McCartney: "We all feel roughly the same. We're all agnostics."
Lennon: "Most people are, anyway."
McCartney: "In America, they're fanatical about God. I know somebody over there who said he was an atheist. The papers nearly refused to print it because it was such shocking news that somebody could actually be an atheist ... yeah ... and admit it."
Starr: "He speaks for all of us."

It was also in February 1965 that filming for Help! began, on location in the Bahamas. During filming, a Hindu devotee presented each Beatle with a book about reincarnation. The incident is widely regarded as having instigated the band's interest in Indian culture.

In August 1966, on the eve of the Beatles' 1966 US tour, American teen magazine Datebook published Lennon's remark that the Beatles had become "more popular than Jesus". Lennon had, in fact, originally made the remark to the British newspaper London Evening Standard and when it was first published in the United Kingdom, in March 1966, his words had provoked no public reaction. After Datebook quoted his comments five months later, however, vociferous protests broke out in the United States. The Beatles' records were publicly burned, threats were made and some radio stations refused to play their music. The protest also spread to other countries including Mexico, South Africa and Spain.

Two press conferences were held in the US, where both Brian Epstein and Lennon expressed their regret that Lennon's words had been taken out of context and offence taken. At one of the conferences, Lennon described his own belief in God by quoting the Bishop of Woolwich, saying, "... not as an old man in the sky. I believe that what people call God is something in all of us." The US tour went ahead as planned, although there was some disruption and picketing of their concerts.

Harrison's interest in Indian culture expanded to Hinduism and after the 1966 American tour, until the commencement of the Sgt. Pepper's Lonely Hearts Club Band album, he and his first wife Pattie Boyd went on a pilgrimage to Mumbai where Harrison studied sitar, visited various holy places and met several gurus, including Maharishi. Two years later in 1968, all four Beatles travelled to Rishikesh in northern India to study meditation with the Maharishi Mahesh Yogi. Although the band later fell out with the Maharishi, Harrison continued his interest in Eastern philosophy. He embraced the Hare Krishna tradition and, in the summer of 1969, produced the single "Hare Krishna Mantra", performed by the devotees of the London Radha Krishna Temple.

== Post-Beatles ==
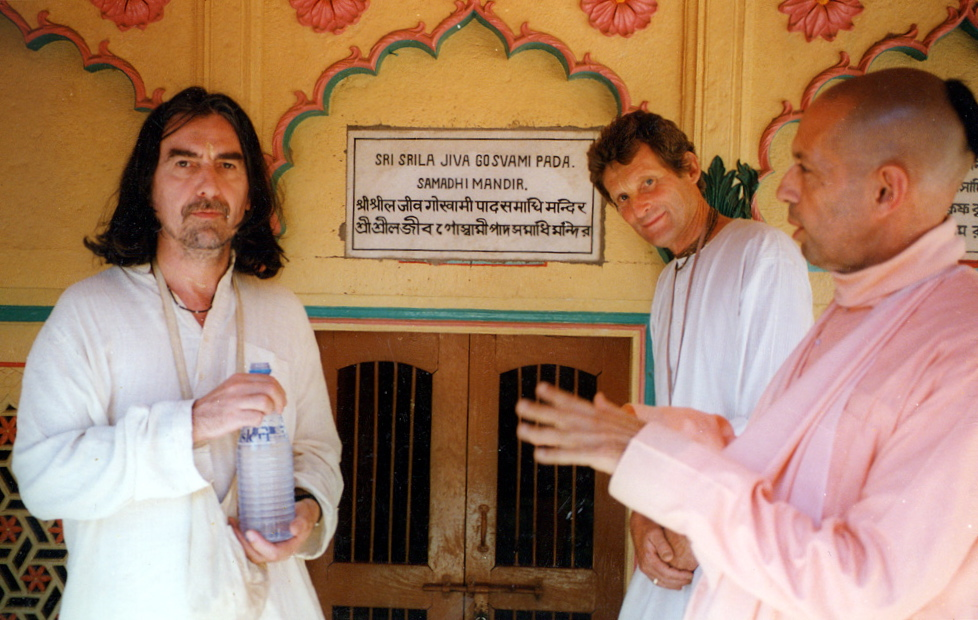
George Harrison (left) with Hare Krishna devotees Shyamsundar Das and Mukunda Goswami in the Indian holy city of Vrindavan, in 1996

After the break-up of the Beatles, Lennon continued to reject religious teaching and organised religions. His 1971 single "Imagine" has been described as an "atheist anthem". He sings about his beliefs in the song "God", in which he states, "I don't believe in magic, I Ching, the Bible, tarot, Jesus, Buddha, mantra, the Gita and yoga". Although he commonly rejected the notion of religion, he did claim to have a spiritual side. As for "The Maharishi," John said, "(He) was good for me, like anybody who has something to tell you that you don’t know enough about. He was no substitute for anything, though. There's a lot of good in Christianity, but you've got to learn the basics, and the basics from the Eastern beliefs, and work them together for yourself... I’d like to be like Christ, in a pure sense... love is a great gift, like a precious flower or something. You have to... look after it... you have to protect it." In 1977, Lennon briefly converted to Christianity (and claimed to be born-again) after becoming a fan of several televangelists, and corresponded with some, including Oral Roberts and Pat Robertson. In an interview conducted in September 1980, three months before his death, Lennon told Playboy journalist David Sheff: "People always got the image I was an anti-Christ or antireligion. I'm not. I'm a most religious fellow." When talking about Bob Dylan's new-found Christianity, Lennon said, "But the whole religion business suffers from the 'Onward, Christian Soldiers' bit. There's too much talk about soldiers and marching and converting. I'm not pushing Buddhism, because I'm no more a Buddhist than I am a Christian, but there's one thing I admire about the religion [Buddhism]: There's no proselytizing." Furthermore, Lennon wrote and recorded the original songs “Talking With Jesus” and “You Saved My Soul.” “You Saved My Soul” was one of Lennon's final demos and final composition. Lennon’s long-time personal assistant, Fred Seaman, also observed in 1984 that “John was deeply religious, though in a most unconventional fashion. He viewed The Bible as a universal symbolic drama that was enacted daily in front of our eyes.”

Harrison continued to embrace the Hare Krishna tradition (particularly japa-yoga chanting with beads) and became a lifelong devotee. He was a vegetarian, on religious grounds, from 1968 until his death. Towards the end of his life, he also embraced alternative views of Christianity; according to his friend Deepak Chopra, Harrison was a keen reader of the Gnostic gospels and the Gospel of Thomas. Along with his wife Olivia, son Dhani and close friends, members of the Radha Krishna Temple were at his bedside when Harrison died in Los Angeles on 29 November 2001. In her press statement, Olivia referred to the Hindu aspiration of breaking the cycle of rebirth (and so achieving moksha), saying: "The profound beauty of the moment of George's passing – of his awakening from this dream – was no surprise to those of us who knew how he longed to be with God. In that pursuit, he was relentless." In accordance with his wishes, Harrison's ashes were scattered at Varanasi in India, at the confluence of the Ganges, Yamuna and Saraswati rivers.

Speaking at the Grammy Museum, Los Angeles, in February 2010, Starr stated that he had recently returned to monotheism, saying "I stepped off the path there for many years and found my way [back] onto it, thank God." He was also reported as saying "For me, God is in my life. I don't hide from that. ... I think the search has been on since the '60s." In Olivia Harrison's 2011 book George Harrison: Living in the Material World, Starr describes himself as "a Christian Hindu with Buddhist tendencies". Starr added that, as with his belated admiration for Indian music, this was "Thanks to George, who opened my eyes as much as anyone else's."

In a 2012 interview for The Independent, McCartney, when asked if religion played a role in his personal life, responded, "Not really. I have a kind of personal faith in something good, but it doesn't really go much further than that", while stating "there is something greater than me". He also went on to say, "Jesus I could see, that's a historical character."

== See also ==
- Outline of the Beatles
- The Beatles timeline
- The Beatles in India
- "More popular than Jesus"
