= More popular than Jesus =

Controversial remark made by John Lennon

WAYX's "Beatle burning" in Waycross, Georgia, held in response to the "Jesus" remark, 8 August 1966

"More popular than Jesus" (Note: "Bigger than Jesus" has been used in analysis of the controversy, but Lennon's words were "more popular than Jesus".) is a phrase taken from a 1966 interview in which John Lennon of the Beatles claimed that the public's infatuation with the band surpassed that of Jesus Christ, and that Christian faith was declining to the point where it might be outlasted by rock music. His opinions drew no controversy when published in the Evening Standard in London, but ignited angry reactions from Christian communities when republished in the United States.

Lennon's comments incited protests and threats, particularly throughout the Bible Belt in the Southern United States. Some radio stations stopped playing Beatles songs, records were publicly burned, press conferences were cancelled, and the Ku Klux Klan picketed concerts. The controversy coincided with the band's 1966 US tour and overshadowed press coverage of their newest album, Revolver. Lennon apologised at a series of press conferences, clarifying that he was not comparing himself to Christ.

The controversy deeply impacted the band, contributing significantly to their decision to cease touring entirely. In 1980, Lennon was murdered by a religious Beatles fan, Mark David Chapman, who sometimes stated that Lennon's comment was a motivating factor in the killing.

== Background ==
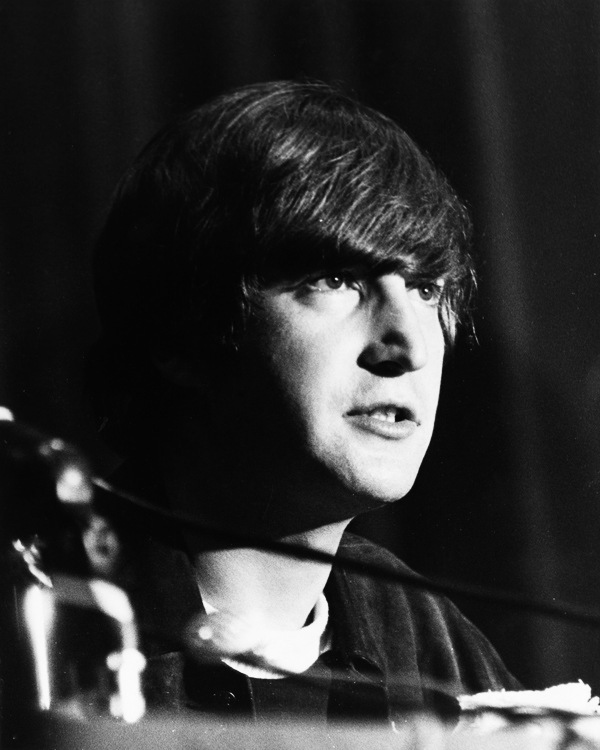
John Lennon speaking to reporters in September 1964

In March 1966, London's Evening Standard ran a weekly series titled "How Does a Beatle Live?" that featured individual interviews with Beatles John Lennon, Ringo Starr, George Harrison and Paul McCartney. The articles were written by Maureen Cleave, who knew the group well and had interviewed them regularly since the start of Beatlemania in the United Kingdom. She had described them three years earlier as "the darlings of Merseyside", and in February 1964 had accompanied them on their first visit to the United States. She chose to interview the band members individually for the lifestyle series, rather than as a group.

Cleave conducted the interview with Lennon in February at Kenwood, his residence in Weybridge, Surrey. Her article portrayed him as restless and in search of meaning in his life; he discussed his interest in Indian music and said he gleaned most of his knowledge from reading books. Among Lennon's many possessions, Cleave found a full-sized crucifix, a gorilla costume, a medieval suit of armour, and a well-organised library containing works by Alfred, Lord Tennyson, Jonathan Swift, Oscar Wilde, George Orwell, and Aldous Huxley. Another book, Hugh J. Schonfield's The Passover Plot, had influenced Lennon's ideas about Christianity, although Cleave did not refer to it in the article. She mentioned that Lennon was "reading extensively about religion", and quoted him as saying:

Christianity will go. It will vanish and shrink. I needn't argue about that; I'm right and I'll be proved right. We're more popular than Jesus now; I don't know which will go first – rock 'n' roll or Christianity. Jesus was all right but his disciples were thick and ordinary. It's them twisting it that ruins it for me.

Cleave's interview with Lennon was published in The Evening Standard on 4 March under the secondary heading "On a hill in Surrey ... A young man, famous, loaded, and waiting for something". The article provoked no controversy in the UK, where Church attendance was in decline and Christian churches were attempting to transform their image to make themselves more "relevant to modern times". According to author Jonathan Gould: "The satire comedians had had a field day with the increasingly desperate attempts of the Church to make itself seem more relevant ('Don't call me vicar, call me Dick ...')." In 1963, Bishop of Woolwich John Robinson had published the book Honest to God, urging the nation to reject traditional church teachings on morality and the concept of God as an "old man in the sky" and instead embrace a universal ethic of love. Bryan R. Wilson's 1966 text Religion in Secular Society explained that increasing secularisation led to British churches being abandoned. However, traditional Christian faith was still strong and widespread in the United States at that time. The theme of religion's irrelevance in American society had nevertheless been featured in a cover article titled "Is God Dead?" in Time magazine, in an issue dated 8 April 1966.

Both McCartney and Harrison had been baptised in the Roman Catholic Church, but neither of them followed Christianity. In his interview with Cleave, Harrison was also outspoken about organised religion, as well as the Vietnam War and authority figures in general, whether "religious or secular". He said: "If Christianity's as good as they say it is, it should stand up to a bit of discussion." According to author Steve Turner, the British satirical magazine Private Eye responded to Lennon's comments by featuring a cartoon by Gerald Scarfe that showed him "dressed in heavenly robes and playing a cross-shaped guitar with a halo made out of a vinyl LP". (Note: Among other responses in the UK press, an unnamed reader wrote to The Evening Standard saying that Lennon's remark was "impudent". The reader objected more to the fact that Lennon discussed how he had dismissed his father from Kenwood, since, "No gentleman would discuss his private family affairs for publication in a national newspaper.")

== Publication in the US ==
Newsweek made reference to Lennon's "more popular than Jesus" comments in an issue published in March, and the interview had appeared in Detroit magazine in May. On 3 July, Cleave's four Beatles interviews were published together in a five-page article in The New York Times Magazine, titled "Old Beatles – A Study in Paradox". None of these provoked a strong reaction.

The September 1966 "Shout-Out" issue of Datebook magazine that sparked the controversy

Beatles press officer Tony Barrow offered Cleave's four interviews to Datebook, an American teen magazine. He believed that the pieces were important to show fans that the Beatles were progressing beyond simple pop music and producing more intellectually challenging work. Datebook was a liberal magazine that addressed subjects such as interracial dating and the legalisation of marijuana, so it seemed an appropriate publication for the interviews. Managing editor Danny Fields played a role in highlighting Lennon's comments.

Datebook published the Lennon and McCartney interviews on 29 July, in its September "Shout-Out" issue dedicated to controversial youth-orientated themes including recreational drugs, sex, long hair and the Vietnam War. Art Unger, the magazine's editor, put a quote from Lennon's interview on the cover: "I don't know which will go first – rock 'n' roll or Christianity!" In author Robert Rodriguez's description, the editor had chosen Lennon's "most damning comment" for maximum effect; placed above it on the cover was a quote from McCartney regarding America: "It's a lousy country where anyone black is a dirty nigger!" (Note: In its original context, McCartney was condemning racial discrimination in the United States.) Only McCartney's image was featured on the front cover, as Unger expected that his statement would spark the most controversy. The same Lennon quote appeared as the headline above the feature article. Beside the text, Unger included a photo of Lennon on a yacht, gazing across the ocean with his hand shielding his eyes, accompanied by the caption: "John Lennon sights controversy and sets sail directly towards it. That's the way he likes to live!"

== Escalation and radio bans ==
In late July, Unger sent copies of the interviews to radio stations in the Southern United States. One of the first to react was WAQY in Birmingham, Alabama. There, disc jockey Tommy Charles, upon being informed by co-presenter Doug Layton about Lennon's remarks, declared, "That does it for me. I am not going to play the Beatles any more." During the station's breakfast show on 29 July, Charles and Layton asked for listeners' opinions on Lennon's words, and the response was overwhelmingly negative. The two hosts then publicly destroyed Beatles records, with Charles later explaining, "We just felt it was so absurd and sacrilegious that something ought to be done to show them that they can't get away with this sort of thing." United Press International bureau manager Al Benn heard the WAQY show and filed a news report, which culminated in a major New York Times story on 5 August. This newfound publicity propelled Datebook, which had not been a leading title in the youth magazine market beforehand, to sell a million copies.

Right-wing religious groups deemed Lennon's remarks blasphemous. Over thirty radio stations followed WAQY's lead by refusing to play the Beatles' music. WAQY hired a tree-grinding machine and invited listeners to bring in Beatles memorabilia for destruction. In Reno, Nevada, KCBN aired hourly editorials condemning the band and held a public bonfire on 6 August where the band's albums were burned. Many Southern stations organised similar public burnings. Photos of teenagers participating in the bonfires were widely distributed throughout the US, and the controversy received extensive media coverage through television reports. McCartney later likened these burnings to Nazi book burnings, calling the backlash an example of "hysterical low-grade American thinking".

The furore came to be known as the "'More popular than Jesus' controversy" or the "Jesus controversy". It followed soon after the negative reaction from American disc jockeys and retailers to the "butcher" sleeve photo used on the Beatles' US-only LP Yesterday and Today. Withdrawn and replaced within days of release in June, this LP cover showed the band members dressed as butchers and covered in dismembered plastic dolls and pieces of raw meat. For some conservatives in the American South, according to Rodriguez, Lennon's comments on Christ now allowed them an opportunity to act on their grievances against the Beatles, namely, their long hair and championing of African-American musicians.

== Pre-tour press conferences ==
According to Unger, Brian Epstein, the Beatles' manager, was initially unperturbed about the reaction from the Birmingham disc jockeys, telling him: "Arthur, if they burn Beatles records, they've got to buy them first." Within days, however, Epstein became so concerned by the controversy that he considered cancelling the group's upcoming US tour, fearing that they would be seriously harmed in some way. He flew to New York on 4 August and held a press conference the following day in which he claimed that Datebook had taken Lennon's words out of context, and expressed regret on behalf of the group that "people with certain religious beliefs should have been offended in any way". Epstein's efforts had little effect, as the controversy quickly spread beyond the United States. In Mexico City, there were demonstrations against the Beatles, and a number of countries banned the Beatles' music on national radio stations, including South Africa and Spain. The Vatican issued a denouncement of Lennon's comments, saying that "Some subjects must not be dealt with profanely, not even in the world of beatniks." This international disapproval was reflected in the share price of the Beatles' Northern Songs publishing company, which dropped by the equivalent of 28 cents on the London Stock Exchange.

In response to the furore in the US, a Melody Maker editorial stated that the "fantastically unreasoned reaction" supported Lennon's statement regarding Christ's disciples being "thick and ordinary". Daily Express columnist Robert Pitman wrote, "It seems a nerve for Americans to hold up shocked hands, when week in, week out, America is exporting to us [in Britain] a subculture that makes the Beatles seem like four stern old churchwardens." The reaction was also criticised by some within the US; a Kentucky radio station announced that it would give the Beatles music airplay to show its "contempt for hypocrisy personified", and the Jesuit magazine America wrote that "Lennon was simply stating what many a Christian educator would readily admit."

Epstein proposed that Lennon record an apology at EMI Studios, with Beatles producer George Martin taping. Because Lennon was away on holiday, this would have required him to record it by phone. According to EMI recording engineer Geoff Emerick, engineers spent several days designing a dummy plaster head to amplify a phone recording to make it sound more realistic. This plan was abandoned when Lennon decided against recording the apology.

=== Lennon's apology ===
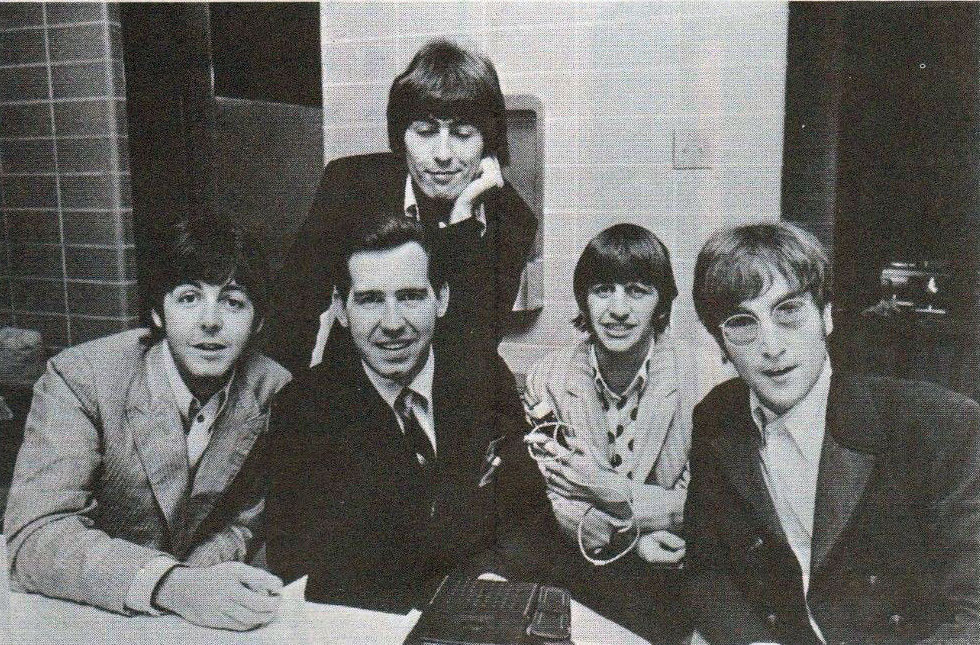
The Beatles with disc jockey Jim Stagg of the Chicago station WCFL in August 1966

The Beatles left London on 11 August for their US tour. Lennon's wife Cynthia said that he was nervous and upset because he had made people angry simply by expressing his opinion. The Beatles held a press conference in Barrow's suite at the Astor Tower Hotel in Chicago. Lennon did not want to apologise but was advised by Epstein and Barrow that he should. Lennon was also distressed that he had potentially endangered the lives of his bandmates by speaking his mind. While preparing to meet the reporters, he broke down in tears in front of Epstein and Barrow. To present a more conservative image for the cameras, the Beatles eschewed their London fashions for dark suits, plain shirts, and neckties.

At the press conference, Lennon said: "I suppose if I had said television was more popular than Jesus, I would have got away with it. I'm sorry I opened my mouth. I'm not anti-God, anti-Christ, or anti-religion. I was not knocking it. I was not saying we are greater or better." He stressed that he had been remarking on how other people viewed and popularised the Beatles. He described his own view of God by quoting the Bishop of Woolwich, "not as an old man in the sky. I believe that what people call God is something in all of us." He was adamant that he was not comparing himself with Christ, but attempting to explain the decline of Christianity in the UK. "If you want me to apologise," he concluded, "if that will make you happy, then OK, I'm sorry."

Journalists gave a sympathetic response and told Lennon that people in the Bible Belt were "quite notorious for their Christian attitude". Placated by Lennon's gesture, Tommy Charles cancelled WAQY's Beatles bonfire, which had been planned for 19 August, when the Beatles were due to perform in the South. The Vatican's newspaper L'Osservatore Romano announced that the apology was sufficient, while a New York Times editorial similarly stated that the matter was over, but added, "The wonder is that such an articulate young man could have expressed himself imprecisely in the first place."

In a private meeting with Unger, Epstein asked him to surrender his press pass for the tour, saying that it had been a "bad idea" for Unger to publish the interviews, and to avoid accusations that Datebook and the Beatles' management had orchestrated the controversy as a publicity stunt. Epstein assured him that there would be better publishing opportunities for the magazine if he "voluntarily" withdrew from the tour. Unger refused and, in his account, received Lennon's full support when he later discussed the meeting with him.

== US tour incidents ==
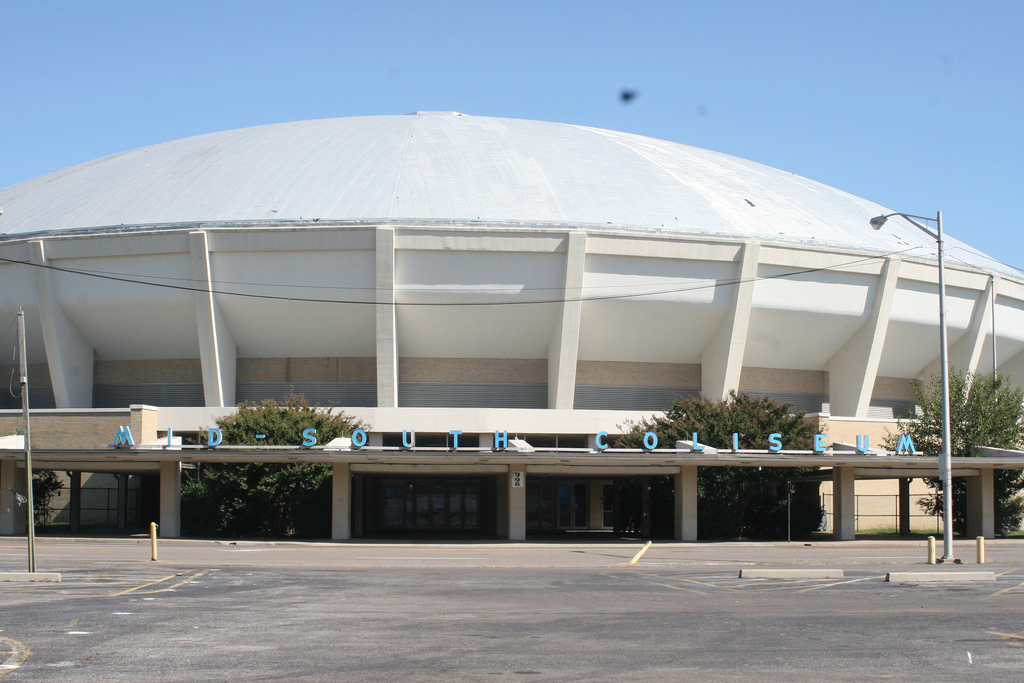
An audience member set off a firework on stage during the Beatles' performance at Mid-South Coliseum in Memphis on 19 August.

The tour was initially marred by protests and disturbances, and an undercurrent of tension. On 13 August, when the band played in Detroit, images were published of South Carolina Ku Klux Klan members "crucifying" a Beatles record on a large wooden cross, which they then ceremoniously burned. That night, the Texas radio station KLUE held a large Beatles bonfire, only for a lightning bolt to strike its transmission tower the following day and send the station temporarily off-air. The Beatles received telephone threats, and the Ku Klux Klan picketed Beatles concerts in Washington, D.C., and Memphis, Tennessee. The latter was the tour's only stop in the Deep South and was expected to be a flashpoint for the controversy. Two concerts took place there at the Mid-South Coliseum on 19 August, although the city council had voted to cancel them rather than have "municipal facilities be used as a forum to ridicule anyone's religion", adding that "the Beatles are not welcome in Memphis".

An ITN news team sent from London to cover the controversy for the program Reporting '66 held interviews with Charles and with teenagers in Birmingham, many of whom were critical of the Beatles. ITN reporter Richard Lindley also interviewed Robert Shelton, the Ku Klux Klan's Imperial Wizard, who condemned the band as "communists" for supporting civil rights. Coinciding with the band's visit to Memphis, local preacher Jimmy Stroad held a Christian rally to "give the youth of the mid-South an opportunity to show Jesus Christ is more popular than the Beatles". Outside the Coliseum, a young Klansman told a TV reporter that the Klan were a "terror organization" and would use their "ways and means" to stop the Beatles performing. During the evening show, an audience member threw a firecracker onto the stage, leading the band to believe that they were the target of gunfire.

[In New York City] Christian demonstrators jostled with screaming fans; both sides were liberally armed with placards, Beatles 4-Ever vs. Stamp Out the Beatles. Aloof from the holy war, a young man stood on the street corner, solemnly holding up a sign that read "John Is A Lesbian."

— Author Nicholas Schaffner

At press conferences later in the tour, Lennon attempted to avoid the subject of his "Jesus" comments, reasoning that no further discussion was necessary. Rather than shying away from controversy, however, the Beatles became increasingly vocal about topical issues such as the Vietnam War. (Note: Ignoring Epstein's wishes, the band had first expressed their opposition to the war during a press conference in Tokyo in late June.) In Toronto on 17 August, Lennon expressed his approval of Americans who evaded the draft by crossing into Canada. At their New York press conference on 22 August, the Beatles shocked reporters by emphatically condemning the war as "wrong".

The Beatles hated the tour, partly due to the controversy and adverse reaction to Lennon's comments, and they were unhappy about Epstein continuing to organise live performances that were increasingly at odds with their studio work. The controversy had also overshadowed the American release of their 1966 album Revolver, which the band considered to be their best and most mature musical work yet. Following the tour, Harrison contemplated leaving the group, but he decided to remain on the condition that the Beatles would focus solely on studio recording.

== Legacy ==
=== Cultural impact and validity of Lennon's claim ===
In 1993, Michael Medved wrote in The Sunday Times that "today, comments like Lennon's could never cause controversy; a contemptuous attitude to religion is all but expected from all mainstream pop performers." In 1997, Noel Gallagher claimed that his band Oasis was "bigger than God", but reaction was minimal. The following day, Melanie C of the Spice Girls responded: "If Oasis are bigger than God, what does that make the Spice Girls? Bigger than Buddha? Because we are a darn sight bigger than Oasis". Writing for Mojo magazine in 2002, David Fricke credited Cleave's interview and the controversy as marking the start of modern music journalism. He said that it was "no coincidence" that Paul Williams, then a seventeen-year-old Swarthmore College student, launched Crawdaddy! magazine in 1966, given the Beatles' influence and Lennon's "sense of mission" as a spokesman for youth culture.

Lennon's comments continued to be the subject of scrutiny in right-wing religious literature, particularly in the writing of David A. Noebel, a longstanding critic of the Beatles' influence on American youth. According to a 1987 article by Mark Sullivan in the journal Popular Music, a photo from WAYX's Beatles bonfire in Waycross, Georgia, which shows a child presenting the Meet the Beatles! LP for burning, became "probably the most famous photograph of the entire anti-rock movement". (Note: American singer Todd Rundgren used an edited version of the photo as the cover for Utopia's 1982 album Swing to the Right.) According to Steve Turner, the episode became "so much a part of history" that the words "More popular than Jesus" are synonymous with the controversy.

The controversy was parodied in the 1978 mockumentary All You Need Is Cash, when Neil Innes, playing Ron Nasty, a Lennon parody in the fictional band the Rutles, claimed that he really said "Bigger than Rod (Stewart)".

In 2012, Nathan Smith of the Houston Press compared several aspects of popular media and concluded that Jesus was more popular than the Beatles. In 2015, Philippine Star contributor Edgar O. Cruz said that Lennon's statement proved to be at least half wrong, reporting that "rock 'n roll is dead but Christianity expanded with Catholicism experiencing exceptional growth through Pope Francis' lead".

=== Lennon's life and career ===
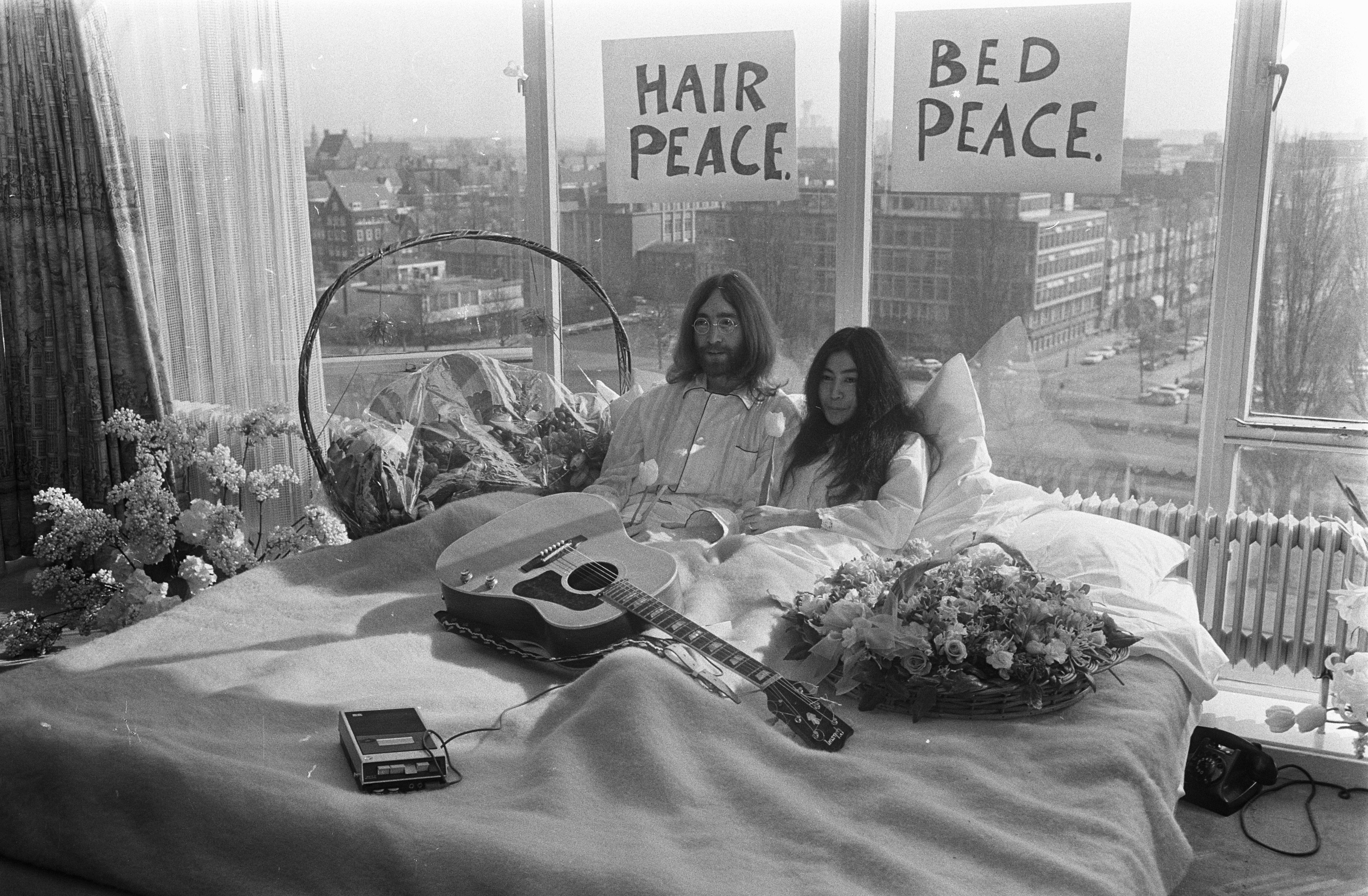
Lennon with wife Yoko Ono during their 1969 Bed-Ins for Peace in Amsterdam

Former Beatles press officer Derek Taylor referred to the controversy in a late 1966 article for the Los Angeles Times West: "I'm seriously worried about someone with a rifle. After all, there's no Kennedy anymore; but you can always shoot John Lennon." After the tour, the Beatles took a break and reconvened in November 1966 to begin recording Sgt. Pepper's Lonely Hearts Club Band, which was released to massive success in June 1967. Lennon wished to include Jesus in the assortment of figures featured on the album's cover, but this was not approved.

At various points in 1968, Lennon claimed to be the living reincarnation of Christ. In May 1969, the band released "The Ballad of John and Yoko" as a single, with Lennon singing the lines, "Christ, you know it ain't easy, you know how hard it can be / The way things are going, they're gonna crucify me." Lennon called himself "one of Christ's biggest fans" during a BBC interview at the time. He also talked about the Church of England, his vision of heaven, and unhappiness over being unable to marry Yoko Ono in church as a divorcee. In December 1969, Lennon was asked whether he would play the part of Jesus in Andrew Lloyd Webber and Tim Rice's new musical Jesus Christ Superstar. (Note: According to Lloyd Webber's 2018 autobiography, Unmasked, neither he nor Rice offered Lennon the role, and the idea was probably formulated by a journalist asking Lennon and then putting it to the producers as they were preparing the show.) Lennon had no interest in the part, although he said that he would have been interested if Ono were to play Mary Magdalene.

During a 1969 visit to Canada, Lennon reiterated his claim that the Beatles had a greater impact on young people than Christ, adding that some ministers had agreed with him. He called the American protestors "fascist Christians" while also saying that he was "very big on Christ". In 1977, Lennon briefly converted to Christianity after becoming a fan of several televangelists, and corresponded with some, including Oral Roberts and Pat Robertson. In 1978, Lennon said that, if he had not made the "more popular" comment, "I might still be up there with all the other performing fleas! God bless America. Thank you, Jesus."

In his 1970 song "God", Lennon sang that he did not believe in Jesus, the Bible, Buddha, or the Gita. Fundamentalist Christian critics of Lennon's lyrics have focused on the opening line from his 1971 song "Imagine", which states, "Imagine there's no heaven." Lennon was murdered on 8 December 1980 by Mark David Chapman, a disillusioned Christian and former Beatles fan. Chapman cited Lennon's "more popular than Jesus" statement and the lyrics of "Imagine" as major provocations, although he also mentioned other motives.

=== Vatican response ===
In April 2010, the Vatican newspaper L'Osservatore Romano published an article marking the 40th anniversary of the Beatles' self-titled album which included comments on Lennon's "more popular than Jesus" remark. Part of the response read: "The remark ... which triggered deep indignation, mainly in the United States, after many years sounds only like a 'boast' by a young working-class Englishman faced with unexpected success, after growing up in the legend of Elvis and rock and roll." Ringo Starr responded: "Didn't the Vatican say we were possibly Satanic, and they've still forgiven us? I think the Vatican's got more to talk about than the Beatles."

== See also ==
- Outline of the Beatles
- The Beatles timeline
- Religion in the United Kingdom
- Religion in the United States
- Religious views of the Beatles
