= The Beatles' 1966 tour of Germany, Japan and the Philippines =

1966 concert tour by the Beatles

- Tour by the Beatles
- Poster to the concerts in Tokyo, Japan
- Start date: 24 June 1966
- End date: 4 July 1966
- No. of shows: 13

The Beatles concert chronology
- 1965 UK tour; 1966 tour of Germany, Japan and the Philippines; 1966 US tour

The English rock group the Beatles toured West Germany, Japan and the Philippines between 24 June and 4 July 1966. The thirteen concerts comprised the first stage of a world tour that ended with the band's final tour of the United States, in August 1966. The shows in West Germany represented a return to the country where the Beatles had developed as a group before achieving fame in 1963. The return flight from the Philippines to England included a stopover in Delhi, India. There, the Beatles indulged in two days of sightseeing and shopping for musical instruments while still under the attention of the press and local fans.

The concerts were well attended yet provided the band with little in the way of artistic fulfilment. The programme was in the package-tour format typical of the 1960s, with two shows per day, several support acts on the bill and the Beatles' set lasting around 30 minutes. The band's setlist included their new single, "Paperback Writer", but no songs from their recently completed album, Revolver. Often marked by poor playing, the shows highlighted the division between what the group could achieve when performing live as a four-piece with inadequate amplification and the more complex music they were able to create in the recording studio. Concerts at the Circus-Krone-Bau in Munich and the Nippon Budokan hall in Tokyo were filmed and broadcast on local television networks.

The tour signalled a change in the Beatlemania phenomenon, as harsh measures were used to restrain crowds for the first time and the band became a symbol of societal division between conservative and liberal thinking. The bookings at the Budokan, a venue reserved for martial arts, offended many traditionalists in Japan, resulting in death threats to the Beatles and a heightened police presence throughout their stay. In Manila, the band's nonattendance at a social engagement hosted by Imelda Marcos led to a hostile reaction from citizens loyal to the Marcos regime, government officials and army personnel. The Beatles and their entourage were manhandled while attempting to leave the country and forced to surrender much of the earnings from the group's two shows at the Rizal Memorial Stadium.

On their return to London, the Beatles were outspoken in their condemnation of the Philippines. As a result of the events in Manila, the band lost faith with their longtime manager Brian Epstein and made the decision to end their career as live performers that year. In contrast, the stay in Tokyo established an enduring bond between the Beatles and Japan, where each of the band members visited or performed in the decades following the group's break-up in April 1970.

== Background ==
... when London was the best place on earth and they were the best people to be, they had to do the one thing they wanted to do the least; they had to leave. It was summer and it was written in the gospel according to Brian that in summer they went out on tour.

— Former Beatles assistant Peter Brown, 1983

Brian Epstein, the Beatles' manager, had intended that 1966 would follow the format of the previous two years, in which the Beatles had made a feature film with an accompanying soundtrack album, toured in North America and select countries during the summer months, and then recorded a second album for a pre-Christmas release. Following the group's UK tour in December 1965, however, the band members decided to reject the planned film project, an adaptation of Richard Condon's novel A Talent for Loving, for which Epstein had purchased the film rights. The band therefore had an unprecedented three months free of professional engagements. The group resumed work in early April, when they began recording Revolver, an album that reflected a more experimental approach as well as the increasing division between the music they made as live performers and their studio work. The band briefly interrupted the sessions to perform at the NME Poll-Winners Concert on 1 May.

During the early months of 1966, Epstein arranged bookings for the Beatles to play a series of concerts beginning in late June, in West Germany, Japan and the Philippines. These locations comprised the first leg of a world tour that would resume on 11 August, when the group embarked on their third US tour. When discussing a possible itinerary in New York on 3 March, Epstein had said that the Beatles were likely to play in Britain also but made no mention of the Philippines. Concerts in what was then the Soviet Union were also under consideration.

The band completed work on Revolver on 22 June and flew to Munich the following day to begin the tour. According to author Jonathan Gould, the Beatles would gladly have stayed in Britain rather than continue to perform in halls filled with screaming fans. The band's dedication to completing Revolver, together with their lack of touring experience since December 1965, ensured that they were under-rehearsed for the concerts. Author Philip Norman writes that the knowledge that they would not be heard above the hysteria of their fans was another factor behind the group's failure to rehearse adequately for the tour.

== Repertoire, tour personnel and equipment ==
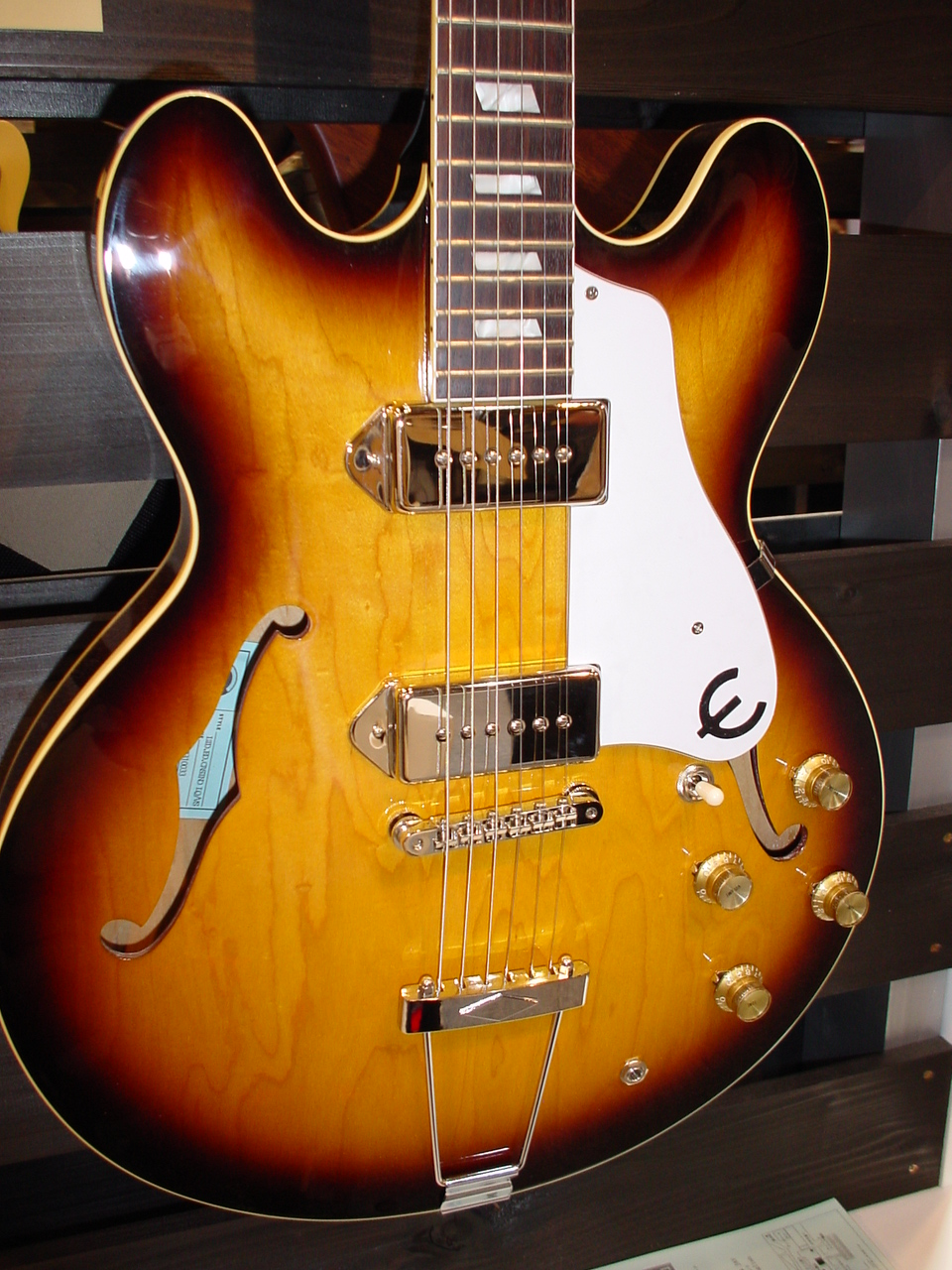
Lennon used an Epiphone Casino as his stage guitar for the first time in 1966. It became his signature instrument during the final years of the Beatles' career.

Given the complexity of their new recordings, the band did not include any of the songs from Revolver in their 1966 setlist. Author and critic Richie Unterberger writes that this omission has been interpreted as laziness by some commentators, yet it was in keeping with the Beatles' policy not to perform any unreleased material. Their current single, "Paperback Writer", was included, but as with the few selections from Rubber Soul they performed live – "Nowhere Man" and "If I Needed Someone" – the Beatles were unable to capture the intricacies of the multi-track recording in concert. The set comprised eleven songs and lasted just over 30 minutes. Aside from the introduction of "Paperback Writer" (in place of "We Can Work It Out"), it was relatively unchanged from the 1965 UK tour. "Rock and Roll Music" became the opening song, while Ringo Starr's moment as the featured singer, "Act Naturally", was replaced by "I Wanna Be Your Man". The Beatles played "Yesterday" – which had previously been a Paul McCartney solo performance, on acoustic guitar – with electric group backing for the first time. According to author Jon Savage, "It was a strange set ... Rockers were interspersed with slow or mid-paced numbers, preventing any excitement from building."

The Beatles' entourage consisted of Epstein, press officer Tony Barrow, road managers Neil Aspinall and Mal Evans and Peter Brown, Epstein's assistant. Robert Whitaker, a photographer who regularly worked with the Beatles during this period, documented their time in Germany and Japan. In addition, Vic Lewis, Epstein and Brown's colleague at the management company NEMS, joined the tour party in Japan, having helped arrange the Far East concerts. The band's chauffeur, Alf Bicknell, was also present in Tokyo and Manila.

The Beatles' main instruments were Epiphone Casino guitars for John Lennon and George Harrison, McCartney's Höfner "violin" bass, and Starr's Ludwig drum kit. After adopting the Epiphone as his stage guitar for 1966, beginning with the NME Poll-Winners Concert, Lennon continued to use it throughout the Beatles' career. (Note: Once stripped of its sunburst-pattern veneer in 1968, the instrument became his signature guitar and, in author Ian MacDonald's description, a "key part of his image".) The band used new 100-watt Vox amplifiers throughout the tour. Harrison played his Rickenbacker 360/12 guitar on "If I Needed Someone", while a photo taken by Whitaker shows that Harrison's Gibson SG and McCartney's Rickenbacker 4001 were also among the guitars they took to Japan.

== West Germany ==
=== Munich and Essen ===
The concerts in West Germany were the Beatles' first in that country since December 1962, when they played a New Year's Eve show as their final engagement at the Star-Club in Hamburg. The principal reason that they had not returned in the past four years was the threat of a paternity claim by a young Hamburg woman. (Note: Epstein had arranged for the woman to be paid off in advance of the tour, to guarantee her silence. Otherwise, McCartney, whom the woman claimed was the father of her daughter, faced arrest by the Youth Welfare department.) The 1966 visit was presented by Karl Buchmann Productions and sponsored by Bravo magazine. At the Beatles' insistence, the venues were restricted to a maximum capacity of 8,000 seats, which meant that Bravo was making a loss on the outlay for the tour. The band arrived in Munich on 23 June, exhausted from their recent work in the studio, and booked into the Hotel Bayerischer Hof, where they gave a short press conference. The support acts for the German concerts were Peter and Gordon, Cliff Bennett and the Rebel Rousers and the Rattles. The latter were a German group who had performed on the same circuit in Hamburg as the Beatles in 1962.

The first shows were held at Munich's 3,500-seat Circus-Krone-Bau at 5:15 p.m. and 9:00 p.m. on 24 June. The Beatles wore matching dark green suits with silk lapels, designed by the new Chelsea boutique Hung On You. The 9:00 p.m. show was videotaped by the West German ZDF network and first broadcast locally, in edited form, on 5 July. The Beatles held a rare backstage rehearsal in advance of the concert. According to musicologist Walter Everett, the Munich concert film shows the Beatles generally playing poorly amid the noise created by their fans and humorously attempting to remember the lyrics to the final song, "I'm Down". Author Steve Turner writes that the tour was marked by average-quality performances masked by riotous screaming and that for the first time, the hysterical crowds were subjected to violent treatment and beatings by the host nation's police force.

The Beatles travelled between destinations by train, accommodated in luxury coaches that were normally used for visits by international heads of state, including Queen Elizabeth II's the previous year. After arriving in Essen on 25 June, they played two shows at the city's Grugahalle. A correspondent from Beatles Monthly magazine described the concerts as "frightening" due to the police's subjugation of the group's fans using tear gas and guard dogs. The band then travelled overnight to Hamburg, where they stayed at the Hotel Schloss, a former palace located well north of the city centre.

=== Return to Hamburg ===
Their arrival in Hamburg was highly anticipated. It was the German audiences in Hamburg who'd spotted the group's potential and had nurtured their development from callow adolescent hobbyists to battle-hardened professionals.

— Author Steve Turner, 2016

The Beatles' return to Hamburg was viewed as a homecoming due to their past connections with the city. On 26 June, the band played two shows at the 5,600-seat Ernst-Merck-Halle and reunited with old friends such as Astrid Kirchherr and with Bert Kaempfert, a German arranger and composer who had briefly worked as the Beatles' producer. Lennon was heard to say during one of the Ernst-Merck-Halle concerts: "Don't listen to our music. We're terrible these days." Among those attending the concert was the future Chancellor of West Germany Helmut Schmidt and his wife Loki. A scheduled group outing to St Pauli, the area of Hamburg where the Beatles had been based in the early 1960s, was cancelled due to the potential security risk. Lennon and McCartney nevertheless made a late-night visit to familiar sites along the Reeperbahn in St Pauli.

The band members had a mixed experience in Hamburg. Harrison later said that "a lot of ghosts materialised out of the woodwork – people you didn't necessarily want to see again, who had been your best friend one drunken Preludin night back in 1960." McCartney commented: "It was as if we'd mutated into something different and yet we were still just the boys. But we knew and they knew that we'd got famous in the meantime …" The Beatles had also tired of the generally inane questions put to them at press conferences throughout the German tour, with only McCartney attempting to humour the local reporters. At the between-shows press conference in Hamburg, Lennon's impatience was palpable, leading a female reporter to ask why the band had become "so horrid and snobby". On 27 June, the Beatles and their entourage flew from Hamburg to London's Heathrow Airport, where they boarded a Japan Airlines (JAL) flight over the North Pole to Tokyo.

== Japan ==
=== Ideological concerns and controversy ===
The Beatles' flight to Tokyo stopped in Anchorage, Alaska late on 27 June, local time, and was grounded there due to the presence of a typhoon over Japan. (Note: Known as Typhoon Kit, it was among the most intense cyclones yet recorded.) Epstein arranged for the Beatles to wait out the delay at Anchorage's Westward Hotel, where the band's presence instantly attracted a crowd of local fans, who serenaded them from the street below. The flight finally arrived at Haneda Airport in Tokyo in the early hours of 29 June, according to a report by Dudley Cheke, a chargé d'affaires at the British Embassy. Alternatively, an arrival time of around 3:30 a.m. on 30 June is given by Beatles biographers Barry Miles and John Winn and in a 2016 Tokyo Weekender article about the visit. (Note: Turner, who also supports an early-morning arrival on 29 June, describes the Beatles' time in Alaska as having lasted a matter of hours. According to Alf Bicknell, however, the tour party "spent 24 hours there", during which they "got as drunk as skunks".)

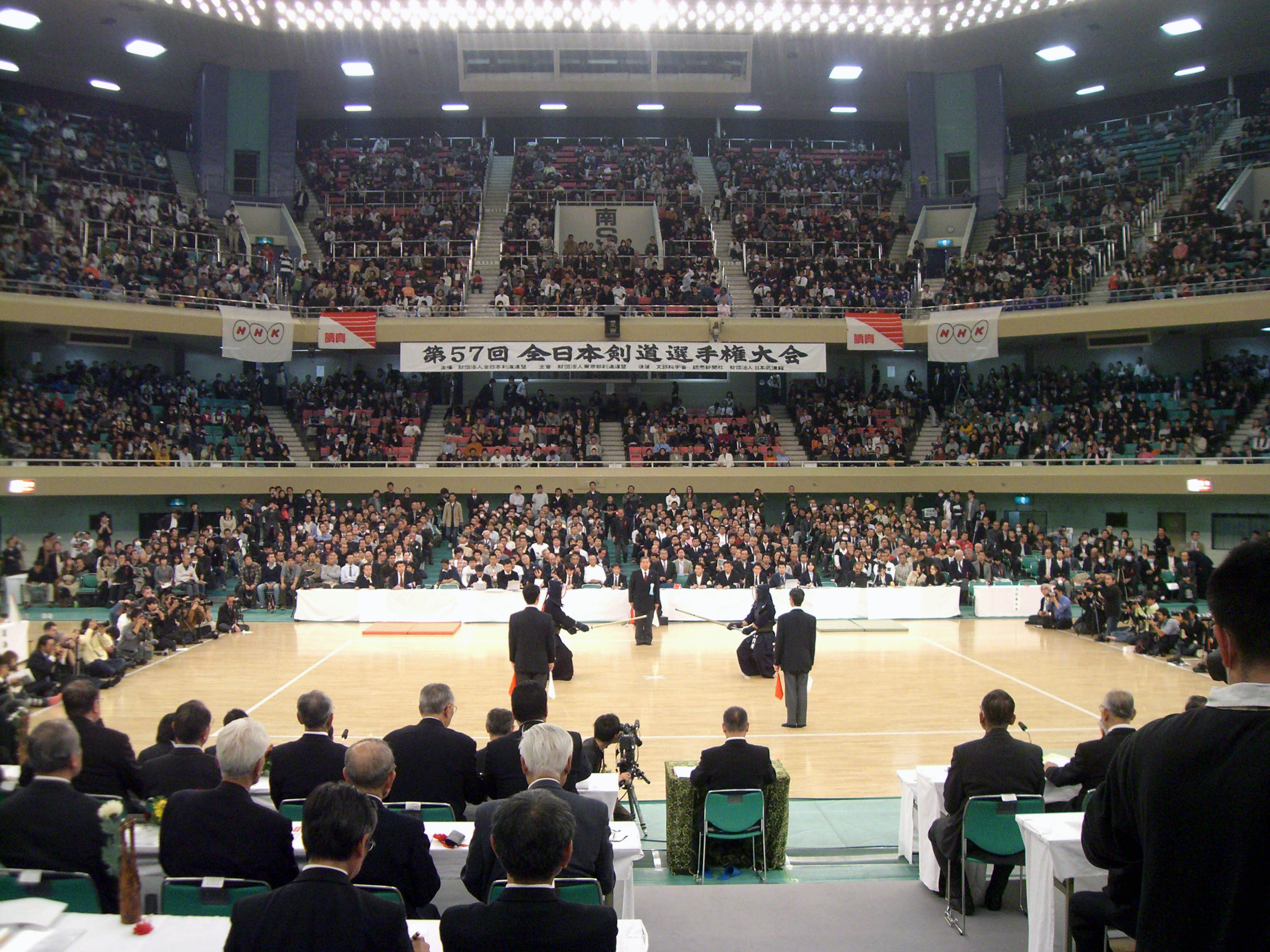
The National Kendo Championship, Nippon Budokan, November 2009. The Beatles were the target of death threats from Japanese nationalists when they played the first-ever rock concerts held at the Budokan.

The Beatles served as cultural ambassadors in Japan, where the authorities had viewed the band in an unfavourable light until their appointment as MBEs in 1965. The visit had been the subject of national debate and coincided with an era in which Japan sought to re-establish its cultural identity, following the country's defeat in World War II. While the more progressive-minded elements of the population welcomed the spirit of change and youthful optimism that the Beatles represented, traditionalists were opposed to the band's influence. To meet Epstein's requirement of $100,000 (equivalent to $1,000,000 in 2025) for each performance, the 10,000-seat Nippon Budokan hall was chosen; tickets were priced at twice the rate of any previous visiting pop act.

The announcement that the concerts were to take place at the Budokan – a venue reserved for martial arts, as well as a shrine to Japan's war dead – outraged the country's hardline nationalists, who vowed to intercede and stop the proceedings. This issue, combined with a written death threat that the Beatles had received while in Hamburg, ensured that security around the group was extreme throughout their stay. (Note: In Brown's recollection, on arrival at Haneda, they were advised by a police commissioner that "a kamikaze squad of right-wing militant students, who objected to the Western 'perversion' of Japanese culture, had vowed that the Beatles would never leave Japan alive.") In an operation that compared with Japan's measures when hosting the 1964 Olympic Games, around 35,000 police and fire brigade personnel were mobilised to protect the Beatles.

=== Arrival and confinement ===
The four band members descended from the aircraft dressed in happi coats bearing the JAL logo. Their attire was a publicity coup for the airline, who, recognising the value of being associated with the Beatles' financial success, had instructed one of its First Class flight attendants to ensure that the band emerged wearing these traditional Japanese coats. Faced with a wall of glaring lights, the four musicians believed they were waving to a throng of fans, as was usual when they arrived in a new country. In fact, they were surrounded by security personnel, and only twenty members of the public were present to witness their arrival. Supervised by a large police presence, the band's fans were instead organised in groups along the road into the city. In a 2016 feature article on the Beatles' Tokyo concerts, The Japan Times said that the photograph of the group dressed in JAL happi coats and descending from the plane had become "an iconic image of the Beatles' visit".

The Beatles were accommodated in the Presidential Suite of the Tokyo Hilton. For the duration of their stay in Japan, the band members were confined to the suite, aside from a single press conference and the concert performances. During the press conference, held in the afternoon of 30 June, Lennon spoke out publicly against the Vietnam War on the Beatles' behalf. This marked the first time that the band had spoken out against the war in one of their press conferences, and followed Lennon and Harrison's warning to Epstein before the tour that they were no longer prepared to stay silent on this issue.

A scheduled group visit to Kamakura on 30 June was cancelled after the Beatles learned that the police could not guarantee their safety. Accompanied by one of their road managers, Lennon and McCartney each managed to venture out at one point, only to be escorted back to the hotel once they were discovered. (Note: Having borrowed Whitaker's press pass, Lennon made the most progress. He visited the Azabu area and shopped in the Oriental Bazaar.) Starr recalls that every time the Beatles had to leave for an engagement, the process was handled with military-style precision by their Japanese hosts. To lighten the mood, the band took to delaying their exit from the hotel suite, thereby causing consternation for the time-conscious security staff.

=== Concerts and reception ===
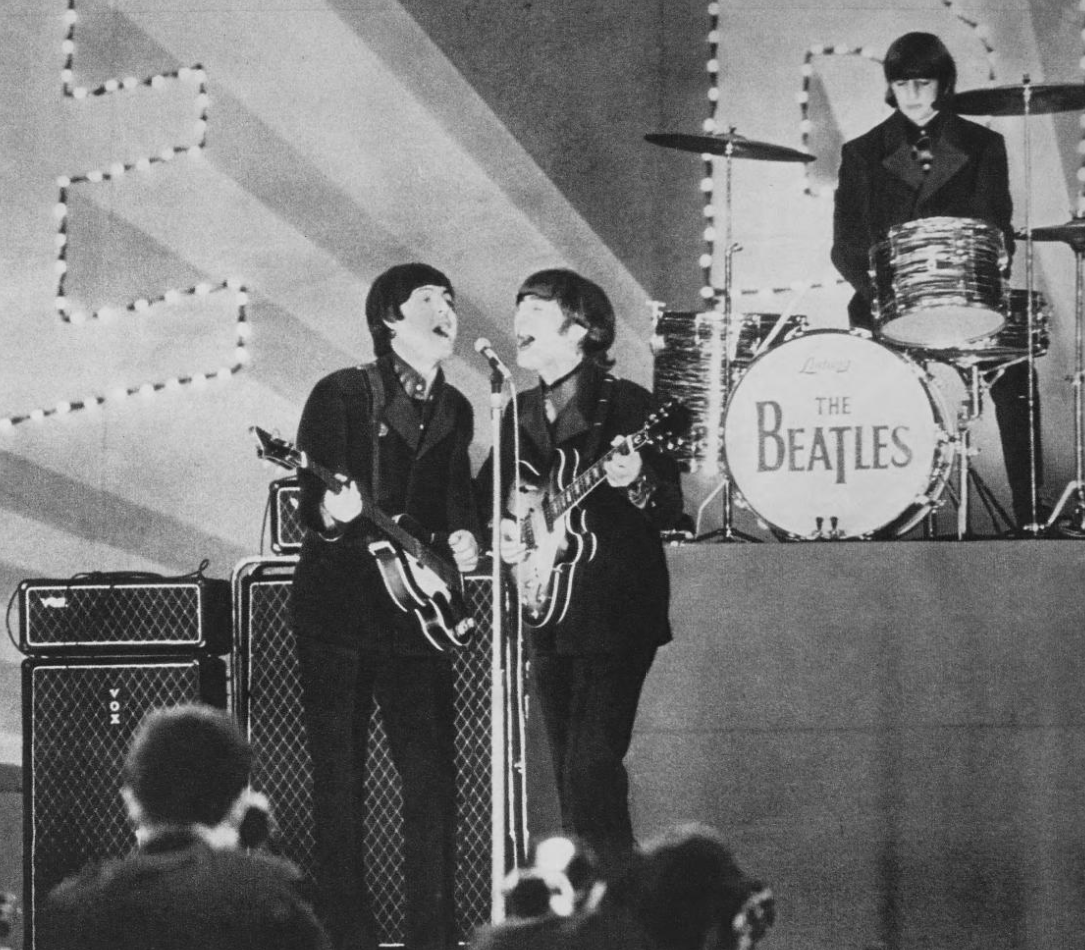
Left to right: McCartney, Lennon, and Starr at the 30 June concert in Tokyo

The band played the first of their five concerts at the Budokan on 30 June. (Note: Originally, the Beatles were booked to play three shows in as many days. Due to popular demand, two further shows were added in May 1966: matinee performances on 1 and 2 July.) The support acts were all local artists: the Drifters, Yuya Uchida, Isao Bitoh, the Blue Comets, Hiroshi Mochizuki, and the Blue Jeans. The shows were sponsored by the Japanese newspaper Yomiuri Shimbun and promoted by the Kyodo Agency. Both the 30 June performance, when the Beatles were dressed in dark green suits with red shirts, and the first show on 1 July, when they wore Hung On You-designed grey suits with thin orange stripes, were filmed in colour by Nippon TV. The footage was swiftly edited by the television company and combined with brief segments of documentary footage for broadcast, as The Beatles Recital: From Nippon Budokan, Tokyo, at 9:00 p.m. on 1 July.

As ultranationalist students demonstrated in the city and outside the venue, the police presence was especially heavy inside and around the stage. According to Tony Barrow, the police feared that these right-wing students might have placed snipers in the audience. The stage itself was set on an 8-foot-high podium; all ground-floor seating had been cleared, meaning the audience was restricted to the hall's first and second tiers. Concertgoers were warned that anyone standing up or cheering risked being arrested. The Beatles felt that the uniformed officers subdued the crowd, although the Japanese fans' more reserved nature, relative to the group's usual audiences, was also a factor. The band gave an especially poor performance on 30 June. (Note: The first two songs from this opening concert, "Rock and Roll Music" and "She's a Woman", were included on the Beatles' 1996 compilation Anthology 2.) According to Barrow and Aspinall, the group were humbled by this, having grown accustomed to not hearing themselves play, and resolved to perform well for the remainder of the Budokan dates.

During their extended periods in the hotel suite, the Beatles collaborated on a psychedelic-themed painting, using brushes and paints supplied by one of the visiting tradesmen, and listened to a tape of their new album. Whitaker photographed them at work and later commented: "I never saw them calmer, more contented than at this time. They were working on something that let their personalities come out … They'd stop, go and do a concert and then it was, 'Let's go back to the picture!'" (Note: Titled Images of a Woman, the painting was signed by all four Beatles and donated to the head of the band's Japanese fan club when he visited them at the Hilton.) Having struggled to find a title for the new album since their arrival in Munich, the Beatles finally settled on Revolver and informed EMI of their decision by telegram on 2 July. Whitaker recalled that, despite the hours of confinement in the Hilton, the atmosphere within the band while in Tokyo was "a crescendo of happiness".

In sober truth, no recent event connected with the UK – apart from the sole exception of the British Exhibition of 1965 – has made a comparable impact on Tokyo … Most commentators accepted them for what indeed they are – agreeable, talented and quick-witted young musicians.

— Michael Stewart, Britain's ambassador to Tokyo, reporting on the Beatles' visit

The Beatles and their entourage departed for Manila in the Philippines, via Hong Kong, mid-morning on 3 July. The Japanese press were highly favourable in their assessments of the Beatles' visit, with the extreme security measures and the brevity of the band's performances being the only areas of disappointment. Reporting to the Foreign Office in London, Dudley Cheke wrote that the cyclone over Japan had been replaced by a "Beatles typhoon", which "swept the youth of Japan off their feet". The Beatles embodied a new identity for the country's youth; in the description of Japanese academic Toshinobu Fukuya, their presence had signalled that "one did not always have to obediently follow arrangements prescribed by adults; it was possible to follow one's own path and still be socially and financially successful in life." On 15 July, the Beatles' stay in Japan was the subject of an article in America's Life magazine.

== Philippines ==
=== Arrival in Manila ===
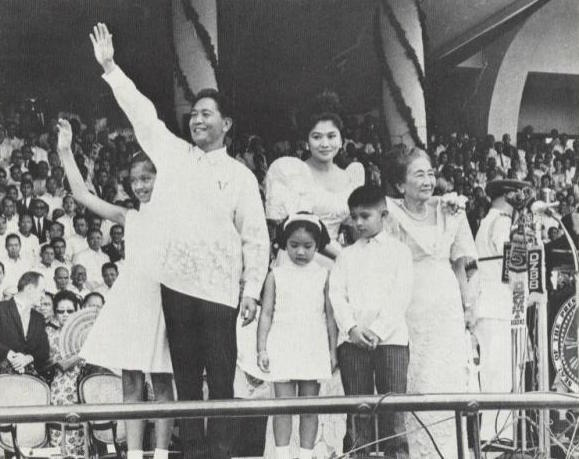
Ferdinand and Imelda Marcos and their family at the presidential inauguration in December 1965. The couple styled their image on that of their former US counterparts John F. Kennedy and Jackie Kennedy, and claimed to be keen fans of the Beatles.

The Beatles' concerts in Manila had been anticipated by the local population on a level that Gould likens to the band's 1964 tour of Australia, when the whole country appeared to view the visit as a national event. The group's commitment to perform in the Philippines reinforced the country's pro-Western image and was especially welcomed by the recently elected president, Ferdinand Marcos, and his wife Imelda. Although the Beatles' tour itinerary originally listed the venue as the Araneta Coliseum (the Araneta family had refused to set the ticket price at an expensive 50 pesos), the concerts took place at the Rizal Memorial Stadium. The shows were promoted by Ramon Ramos and his company Cavalcade International Productions.

The Cathay Pacific flight carrying the Beatles landed at Manila Airport at 4:30 p.m. on 3 July. The nation's police and military forces were in a state of high alert comparable with President Eisenhower's 1960 visit; noting the prevalence of firearms, one of the Beatles asked whether there was a war taking place in the Philippines. In Starr's description, the atmosphere was "that hot/Catholic/gun/Spanish Inquisition attitude". Whereas the band and their entourage were usually given the privileges afforded to visiting diplomats, on this occasion, the four Beatles were hustled into a vehicle by armed men wearing civilian clothes.

Harrison later recalled their alarm at being separated from Epstein, Aspinall and Mal Evans for the first time on a tour; his immediate concern was that, with their hand luggage left behind on the runway, the band would be arrested once their supplies of marijuana were discovered by the authorities. The Beatles were driven to the headquarters of the Philippine Navy on Manila Harbour and led to a press conference attended by 40 journalists. (Note: When asked what they planned to say about the Philippines to the Rolling Stones, who were due to play in Manila later that year, Lennon replied: "We'll warn them.")

They were then escorted by military personnel to a luxury yacht owned by Manolo Elizalde, a wealthy Filipino industrialist, whose 24-year-old son wanted to host a party to show off the Beatles to his friends. Epstein finally caught up with the band before the yacht sailed out into Manila Bay. After spending several hours on board, he and the Beatles returned to the marina and, at 4:00 a.m., arrived at the Manila Hotel, where Epstein had booked accommodation.

Music journalists Jim Irvin and Chris Ingham have referred to the Beatles' abduction at the airport and detainment on the yacht as a kidnapping. Alternatively, Turner writes that, unknown to Epstein, arrangements had been made between Ramon Ramos and Vic Lewis for the Beatles to spend the night on the yacht, since that presented a better security option than a city hotel. (Note: Turner cites this mix-up as an example of Epstein appearing to lose his grasp on the Beatles' tour arrangements.) Aspinall, who had arrived at the marina with the Beatles' hand luggage while they were out on the bay, said that their abduction was carried out by a militia gang who were rivals of the individuals presenting the upcoming concerts.

=== Invitation to Malacañang Palace ===
Apart from McCartney, who went sightseeing with Aspinall, the Beatles slept in late on 4 July until woken by security staff intent on taking them to a party hosted by Imelda Marcos in their honour at Malacañang Palace. The event was scheduled for 11:00 a.m. and had been announced in the previous day's edition of The Manila Times. While the Beatles were unaware of this announcement, Epstein had already declined the invitation when they were in Tokyo. This was in keeping with his policy since 1964 regarding all embassy or other official functions to which the group were often invited while on tour. The 1966 itinerary mentioned only that the Beatles might "call in" at the palace at 3:00 p.m. en route to their first concert. Turner interprets the casual wording of this item as Ramos, faced with delivering on Imelda Marcos's wishes, "burying the invitation in the small print, hoping for a compromise on the day". (Note: Imelda had invited 300 guests, comprising the families of local politicians, businesspeople and military chiefs. In an interview with author Howard Sounes, she admitted that her intention was that the Beatles would perform a private concert at the palace.)

When confronted by Lewis, who was also woken by the presidential guards that morning, Epstein dismissed his suggestion and that of Leslie Minford, a chargé d'affaires at the British Embassy, that the Beatles should make an exception for the First Lady of the Philippines. The Beatles were equally adamant; when told by the guards that President Marcos was among the dignitaries awaiting their arrival, Lennon retorted: "Who's he?" The band learned of the offence that Imelda Marcos had taken at their nonappearance while watching television at the hotel before leaving for the first concert. Footage from the palace was broadcast of the empty seats reserved for the four Beatles, children crying in disappointment, and the First Lady saying that the visiting musicians had let her down.

=== Concerts and national backlash ===
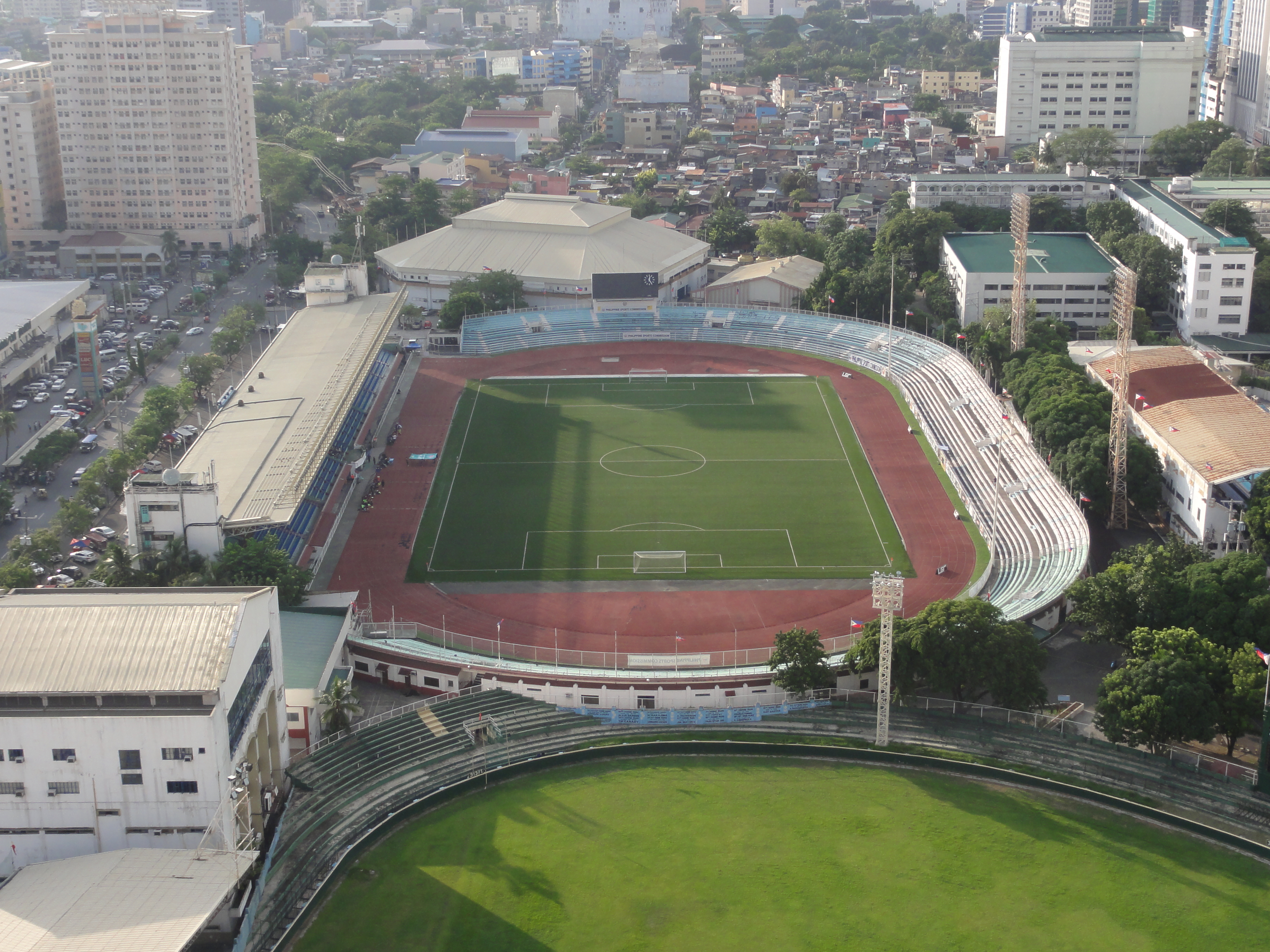
Rizal Memorial Stadium in 2015. The Beatles played two concerts there on 4 July 1966 to a combined audience of 80,000 fans.

The Beatles played the first of their two concerts at the Rizal football stadium at 4:00 p.m. before a crowd of 30,000. The band performed on a small stage behind a wire fence. Pilita Corrales, the Reycards, and the Downbeats were among the six local support acts. The second show took place at 8:30 p.m. and was attended by 50,000 fans. The combined total of 80,000 was the largest audience to see the Beatles in concert on a single day.

The band were well received by their fans, although the poor sound and the distance from the stage was a problem for many. (Note: As a further inconvenience to fans hanging on to the wire fencing in front of them, according to Barrow, uniformed guards took to "beating the kids' knuckles at random" with wooden sticks, even though "these youngsters presented absolutely no safety threat to The Beatles.") In his review of the concerts, Filipino writer Nick Joaquin detected a halfheartedness in the Beatles' performance and said that even the fans' screams "seemed mechanical, not rapture but exhibitionism". Another reviewer concluded: "The sound was terrible, The Beatles were terrific."

After watching the continual news broadcasts at the hotel, between the two shows, Epstein resolved to record a message to explain the Beatles' non-appearance at Malacañang Palace. The message was filmed by the government-owned Channel 5, at the Manila Hotel. When the segment was broadcast later that evening, the sound was distorted – a seemingly deliberate act – and Epstein's explanation was rendered inaudible. Barrow recalls that a backlash against the Beatles was evident straight after the evening show at Rizal, when their convoy of cars was briefly trapped behind a closed gate and surrounded by a large crowd of "organised troublemakers". (Note: Once back at the hotel, the tour party also found that food sent up to their rooms was foul and inedible.)

As the NEMS representative who had dealt directly with the Filipino promoter, Lewis was taken away by police officers during the night and subjected to a three-hour interrogation for his role in "snubbing" the Philippines. Lewis contacted the British Embassy, where Minford, in a telegram to the Foreign Office, reported that "a technical hitch over payment of Philippine income tax" was likely to delay the Beatles' departure. Death threats against the Beatles were reported at the embassy and at their hotel.

=== Departure ===
The Beatles woke up early on 5 July in readiness for their flight to Delhi in India. After their requests for room service had gone unanswered, Evans went down to reception and found that all security protection inside the hotel had disappeared. The morning newspapers carried front-page stories condemning the Beatles for their failure to attend the engagement at Malacañang Palace. The tour party faced further intimidation initiated by Marcos loyalists.

The Bureau of Internal Revenue presented a tax bill on the band's concert earnings, which were still held by Ramos; this was despite a stipulation in NEMS' contract with Cavalcade that any such tax would be paid by the local promoter. All assistance from the hotel staff was withdrawn, as was any police escort through the city traffic, leaving Epstein to call ahead and plead with the pilot of their KLM flight to delay his takeoff. On the way to the airport, their Filipino drivers appeared to forget the route; in another example of what Aspinall termed "obstacles [put] in our way", a soldier sent their cars repeatedly around the same traffic roundabout.

"You treat like ordinary passenger! Ordinary passenger!" they were saying. We were saying: "Ordinary passenger? He doesn't get kicked, does he?"

— John Lennon, recalling the treatment the Beatles received at Manila Airport after inadvertently snubbing the Marcos regime

In Peter Brown's description, when they arrived at the airport, it resembled an "armed military camp". Aside from a heavy army presence, hundreds of irate citizens lined the path into the terminal building, where they harassed and jostled the tour party as each member walked by. Inside the terminal, on the instructions of Willy Jurado, the airport manager, the escalators had been turned off, and the band and their entourage were denied any assistance with musical instruments, amplifiers and luggage.

The crowd from outside the building were then permitted into a glass-walled observation area, from which they continued their haranguing of the Beatles. The tour party moved into a large departure lounge, where uniformed men and others that Harrison recognised as the "thugs" from their arrival in Manila, began beating and kicking them, moving them from one corner of the room into another. Jurado later bragged about knocking Epstein to the ground and punching Lennon and Starr in the face, adding: "That's what happens when you insult the First Lady." Along with Alf Bicknell, Evans received a particularly thorough bashing after he intervened to shield the four band members from their attackers.

The tour party were finally allowed to board the aircraft. According to Barrow, the harassment continued as they crossed the tarmac leading to the steps up to the plane. Some of the band's fans were also present; when they expressed sympathy for the Beatles, they too attracted scorn from the mob. McCartney recalled that, such was their relief once inside the cabin, "We were all kissing the seats." An announcement then called Epstein off the plane to finalise the unpaid tax demand. Barrow and Evans were also told to disembark. (Note: Fearing that he was going to be detained in Manila, Evans asked Harrison to remember him to his wife, saying, "Tell Lil I love her.")

After their passport irregularities had been sorted out, they both re-boarded and the plane was able to take off. Lewis then got into a heated argument with Epstein regarding the concert takings. Epstein admonished Lewis for focusing on money, given the ordeal they had all just endured, and asked him: "Who was it that screwed up the party invitation?"

=== Aftermath ===
Soon after the Beatles had left Manila on 5 July, President Marcos issued a statement acknowledging that the group had not purposely snubbed the First Family. He attributed the violent scenes at the airport to citizens overreacting to a "misunderstanding", and announced that he had lifted the tax on the band's earnings in the Philippines. Although Brown, writing in his 1983 memoir The Love You Make, said that the Beatles' performance fee had been received from Ramos in two installments, subsequent evidence suggests that the band were not paid. In his concluding report to the Foreign Office, Minford mentioned that some individuals at the airport had used "unnecessary zeal" towards the Beatles and he credited Benjamin Romualdez, the brother of Imelda Marcos, with sorting out the episode. (Note: In her interview with Sounes, Imelda said that the incident had been caused by a "sad miscommunication" and that she was unaware of both Epstein's difficulties in retrieving payment for the Beatles' concerts and the government's tax bill on the withheld earnings.)

Writing two weeks after the Beatles' visit, Joaquin commented that the Philippines had been attracted to the band's image without appreciating that, behind the image, their message was one advocating individuality, adventurousness and originality over tradition and order. Joaquin cited this underestimation as the cause of the Beatles' recent problems and likened the group's presence in Manila to Batman being transplanted to Thebes in Ancient Greece.

== Stopover in India ==
Before leaving London, Harrison had arranged to disembark in Delhi with Aspinall on the return trip, and buy a top-quality sitar there. During the tour, the other Beatles had each decided to join the pair, although, after their troubles in Manila, all of the band would have preferred to return to London immediately. Their plane landed at night at Delhi's Palam Airport. While the Beatles had assumed that they were unknown in India, they were welcomed by a crowd of 500 fans and journalists and forced to give a brief press conference. The group's two-day stay in Delhi similarly came to resemble the stops throughout the tour in terms of media attention and periods of confinement in their hotel, the Oberoi.

On 6 July, the band managed to evade the fans camped out in front of the hotel and go to Connaught Place. There, they shopped for Indian musical instruments at Lahore Music House and the prestigious instrument-makers Rikhi Ram & Sons. Since their presence had soon attracted a crowd of fans, the Beatles arranged for the Rikhi Ram staff to visit them later at the Oberoi Hotel with a sitar for Harrison, as well as a sarod, tambura and tabla. The entourage were also given a tour of Delhi, during which their Cadillacs were chased by a vehicle carrying the head of the local Associated Press bureau. Once the journalist had received a comment from McCartney about the controversy in Manila, the tour continued on to villages outside the city. The primitiveness and poverty they saw there was a shock to the band. Starr described India as the first genuinely "foreign" country he had visited; Harrison found it sobering to realise that their Nikon cameras, which were a gift to the group from their Japanese promoter, "were worth more money than the whole village would earn in a lifetime". Other locations they visited while in Delhi included the historic Red Fort and Qutb Minar.

At the Oberoi, the Beatles discussed the recent events in Manila and privately expressed their dissatisfaction with Epstein's management of their tours. According to Brown, when Aspinall said that Epstein was already booking concerts for 1967, Lennon and Harrison insisted that their current tour would be their last. They relayed this decision to Epstein either at the hotel, where he was bedridden with a high fever, or during the flight to London. The decision was also informed by the band's increasing dissatisfaction with the inadequate sound systems at the venues they played and the inane questions they faced at each press conference.

== Return to England and fallout from Manila ==
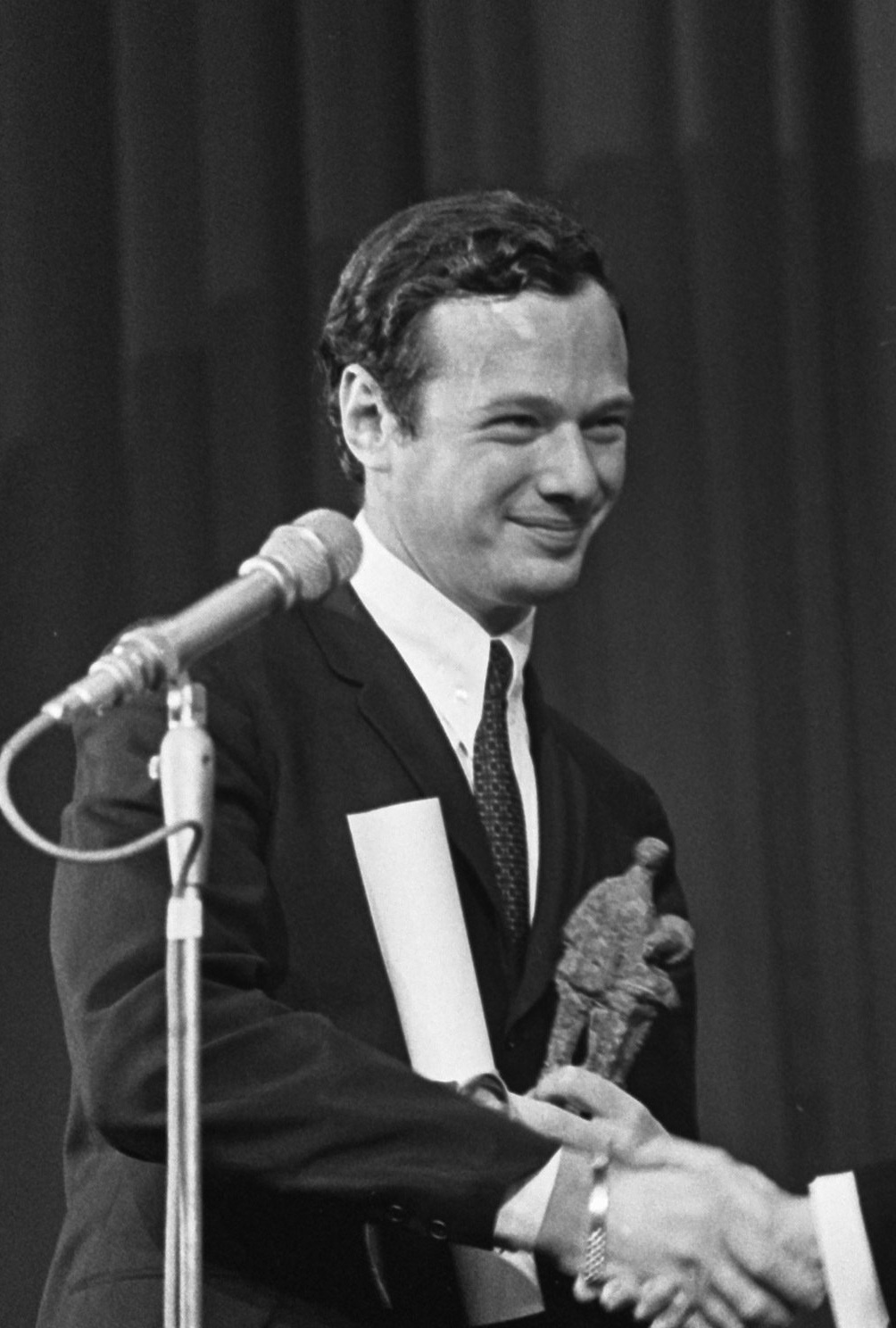
Brian Epstein in October 1965

The Beatles arrived at Heathrow Airport early morning on 8 July and immediately conveyed their bitterness over Manila in a television interview for ITV. Lennon said they would "never go to any nuthouses again" while McCartney accused their attackers of being cowards. Harrison said the only reason to return to the Philippines would be to drop a bomb on the country. Referring to this comment, Lennon wrote on a copy of the tour itinerary: "we all silently agreed." Starr later described their ordeal in Manila as "the most frightening thing that's ever happened to me". Two days after the band's return, it was announced that Freddie and the Dreamers had cancelled their upcoming concerts in the Philippines, as a gesture of solidarity with the Beatles.

Distraught at the group's decision to stop touring, Epstein was diagnosed with glandular fever and went to a remote hotel in North Wales to recover. On 5 August, he was called away to the United States to ameliorate the controversy that had resulted from the publication of Lennon's comment that the Beatles had become more popular than Christ. When the 1966 world tour resumed there on 12 August, the band were the subject of radio bans in some southern states and further death threats. According to Barrow, the decision to quit touring after 1966 was made without McCartney's agreement and marked the first time that the Beatles had committed to a course of action without unanimous agreement among the four. McCartney said that he was finally persuaded to join the others' way of thinking following the group's concert at St. Louis, which took place on 21 August.

== Legacy ==
Over the decades since the Beatles performed their first Asian concerts there in 1966, Japan has continued to occupy a significant place in the band's legacy. After meeting his second wife, the Japanese artist Yoko Ono, in November 1966, Lennon enjoyed visiting the country during the 1970s. In December 1991, having never recovered his enthusiasm for performing live after the Beatles' experiences, Harrison carried out his second of only two tours as a solo artist in Japan. McCartney and Starr have regularly toured the country since the late 1980s.

Following the controversy surrounding the Nippon Budokan's first hosting of a rock concert in 1966, the hall has become the main venue for acts touring Japan. Writing in The Japan Times in 2016, Steve McClure said that the Beatles' performances at the hall had "conferred on it a quasi-sacred status in rock mythology". Among the fans who saw the Beatles perform there were future Japanese music industry executives Aki Tanaka and Kei Ishizaka. Tanaka describes the concerts as "a social phenomenon" and credits them with inspiring "the birth of a real Japanese rock music scene", in which local artists wrote their own songs rather than merely covering Western rock songs.

Steve Turner comments on the significance of the first leg of the Beatles' 1966 world tour in terms of the development of the Beatlemania phenomenon, in that the band's influence now incited "potential acts of terrorism", just as their music had started to "fuel the fight between conservatives and liberals" in the countries they visited. Turner also views the brief stopover in India as important, since it represented the group's formal introduction to a culture with which they became increasingly associated over the next two years.

For several years, the combined audience of 80,000 at the Rizal Memorial Stadium on 4 July 1966 stood as the world record for any act on a single day. The Marcoses were enjoying a honeymoon period in the mid-1960s as the Philippines' American-style First Family, but the president later came to be seen as a dictator and, having amassed a personal wealth of up to $10 billion, fled to the United States after being deposed in 1986. They were indicted for racketeering, although Imelda Marcos was acquitted and returned to the Philippines, where she faced charges of corruption. Given these revelations, McCartney has said that the Beatles were "glad to have done what we did … We must have been the only people who'd ever dared to snub Marcos."

Despite the controversy in 1966, the band's popularity in the Philippines endured. Filipino balladeer and songwriter Jose Mari Chan, a Beatles fan whose career began in the 1960s, stated in 2019: "The Golden Age of OPM, most music lovers would agree, was the period 1973–1990. It was this time period that saw the likes of George Canseco, Willy Cruz, Rey Valera, the Apo Hiking Society, Ernani Cuenco, Nonong Pedero, Hotdog, Freddie Aguilar, Louie Ocampo, etc. If you had interviewed them I am sure that most would admit the influence that Beatles music had on their songs." As of 2016, however, none of the former Beatles had ever returned to the country, in spite of an attempt by Filipino musician Ely Buendia – in response to the promotional campaign for Starr's 2015 album Postcards from Paradise – to lure Starr back to the country.

== Set list ==
According to Walter Everett (lead singers appear in parentheses):

1. "Rock and Roll Music" (John Lennon)
2. "She's a Woman" (Paul McCartney)
3. "If I Needed Someone" (George Harrison)
4. "Day Tripper" (Lennon and McCartney)
5. "Baby's in Black" (Lennon and McCartney)
6. "I Feel Fine" (Lennon)
7. "Yesterday" (McCartney)
8. "I Wanna Be Your Man" (Ringo Starr)
9. "Nowhere Man" (Lennon, with McCartney and Harrison) (Note: The Beatles omitted "Nowhere Man" from their set in Manila.)
10. "Paperback Writer" (McCartney)
11. "I'm Down" (McCartney)

== Tour dates ==
According to Barry Miles and Walter Everett:

List of tour dates with date, city, country, venue
Date (1966)	City	Country	Venue
24 June (two shows)	Munich	West Germany	Circus-Krone-Bau
25 June (two shows)	Essen	West Germany	Grugahalle
26 June (two shows)	Hamburg	West Germany	Ernst-Merck-Halle
30 June	Tokyo	Japan	Nippon Budokan
1 July (two shows)	Tokyo	Japan	Nippon Budokan
2 July (two shows)	Tokyo	Japan	Nippon Budokan
4 July (two shows)	Manila	Philippines	Rizal Memorial Stadium

== See also ==
- List of the Beatles' live performances

== Sources ==
- "Beatlemania at the Shang". Manila Standard. Kamahalan Publishing Corporation. 5 April 2003. p. 25. "Authentic Beatles memorabilia are on exhibit at the Shangri-La Plaza until the end of April. [...] Beatles Forever, The Tour is a partnership between Soundtracks and Shangri-La Plaza Corporation."
- "RJ's rock 'n' roll reunion today". Manila Standard. Kamahalan Publishing Corporation. 25 July 1997. p. 20. "With well-loved tunes from such rock 'n' roll greats as The Beatles, Elvis Presley[...]"
- Barrow, Tony (2005). John, Paul, George, Ringo & Me: The Real Beatles Story. New York, NY: Thunder's Mouth Press. ISBN 1-56025-882-9.
- The Beatles (2000). The Beatles Anthology. San Francisco, CA: Chronicle Books. ISBN 0-8118-2684-8.
- Brown, Peter; Gaines, Steven (2002) [1983]. The Love You Make: An Insider's Story of the Beatles. New York, NY: New American Library. ISBN 978-0-4512-0735-7.
- Clayson, Alan (2003a). George Harrison. London: Sanctuary. ISBN 1-86074-489-3.
- Clayson, Alan (2003b). John Lennon. London: Sanctuary. ISBN 1-86074-487-7.
- Everett, Walter (1999). The Beatles as Musicians: Revolver Through the Anthology. New York, NY: Oxford University Press. ISBN 0-19-512941-5.
- Gil, Baby A. (7 August 2019). "Joe Mari's postcript to Yesterday". Philstar.com. Philstar Global Corp. "Filipino music icon Jose Mari Chan went to watch the movie Yesterday and emerged from the theater much taken by the film's premise."
- Gould, Jonathan (2007). Can't Buy Me Love: The Beatles, Britain and America. London: Piatkus. ISBN 978-0-7499-2988-6.
- Harrison, George (2002) [1980]. I, Me, Mine. San Francisco, CA: Chronicle Books. ISBN 978-0-8118-5900-4.
- Hertsgaard, Mark (1996). A Day in the Life: The Music and Artistry of the Beatles. London: Pan Books. ISBN 0-330-33891-9.
- Ingham, Chris (2006). The Rough Guide to the Beatles (2nd edn). London: Rough Guides/Penguin. ISBN 978-1-84836-525-4.
- Lavezzoli, Peter (2006). The Dawn of Indian Music in the West. New York, NY: Continuum. ISBN 0-8264-2819-3.
- Lewisohn, Mark (2005) [1988]. The Complete Beatles Recording Sessions: The Official Story of the Abbey Road Years 1962–1970. London: Bounty Books. ISBN 978-0-7537-2545-0.
- Lewisohn, Mark (2013). All These Years: Tune In. London: Little, Brown. ISBN 978-0-316-72960-4.
- MacDonald, Ian (1998). Revolution in the Head: The Beatles' Records and the Sixties. London: Pimlico. ISBN 978-0-7126-6697-8.
- Miles, Barry (1997). Paul McCartney: Many Years from Now. New York, NY: Henry Holt. ISBN 0-8050-5249-6.
- Miles, Barry (2001). The Beatles Diary Volume 1: The Beatles Years. London: Omnibus Press. ISBN 0-7119-8308-9.
- Mojo Special Limited Edition: 1000 Days That Shook the World (The Psychedelic Beatles – April 1, 1965 to December 26, 1967). London: Emap. 2002.
- Norman, Philip (2008). John Lennon: The Life. New York, NY: HarperCollins. ISBN 978-0-06-075402-0.
- Quijano de Manila (16 July 1966). "From Yeh Yeh to Go Go". Philippines Free Press. "At the 'people's coliseum' said the Aranetas, no seat was to cost more than ten pesos."
- Rodriguez, Robert (2012). Revolver: How the Beatles Reimagined Rock 'n' Roll. Milwaukee, WI: Backbeat Books. ISBN 978-1-61713-009-0.
- Savage, Jon (2015). 1966: The Year the Decade Exploded. London: Faber & Faber. ISBN 978-0-571-27763-6.
- Schaffner, Nicholas (1978). The Beatles Forever. New York, NY: McGraw-Hill. ISBN 0-07-055087-5.
- Sounes, Howard (2010). Fab: An Intimate Life of Paul McCartney. London: HarperCollins. ISBN 978-0-00-723705-0.
- Turner, Steve (2016). Beatles '66: The Revolutionary Year. New York, NY: HarperLuxe. ISBN 978-0-06-249713-0.
- Unterberger, Richie (2006). The Unreleased Beatles: Music & Film. San Francisco, CA: Backbeat Books. ISBN 978-0-87930-892-6.
- Winn, John C. (2009). That Magic Feeling: The Beatles' Recorded Legacy, Volume Two, 1966–1970. New York, NY: Three Rivers Press. ISBN 978-0-307-45239-9.
- Womack, Kenneth (2014). The Beatles Encyclopedia: Everything Fab Four. Santa Barbara, CA: ABC-CLIO. ISBN 978-0-313-39171-2.
