= Datebook =

Datebook may refer to:

- Diary (stationery), or appointment book
- Datebook (magazine), a 1960s American teen magazine
- Datebook, the arts and entertainment insert section of the San Francisco Chronicle
- Datebook, an application on Palm OS
