= The Beatles' 1965 UK tour =

1965 concert tour by the Beatles

- Tour by the Beatles
- Poster to the concerts in Sheffield
- Associated album: Rubber Soul
- Start date: 3 December 1965
- End date: 12 December 1965
- No. of shows: 18

The Beatles concert chronology
- 1965 US tour; 1965 UK tour; 1966 tour of Germany, Japan and the Philippines

The English rock band the Beatles staged a concert tour of the United Kingdom between 3 and 12 December 1965, comprising 18 shows at nine venues across England, Scotland and Wales. It coincided with the release of the Beatles' studio album Rubber Soul and their double A-side single "Day Tripper" / "We Can Work It Out", and was the final UK tour undertaken by the band. Weary of Beatlemania, the group conceded to do the tour but refused to also perform a season of Christmas concerts as they had done over the 1963–64 and 1964–65 Christmas seasons.

== Background and repertoire ==
Whereas the venues for the Beatles' summer 1965 tour of the United States had been arenas and large auditoriums, their UK concerts were all held in theatres and cinemas. The Beatles rehearsed thoroughly for the tour; according to George Harrison's comments to the NME, their ensemble playing was also helped by their having just finished an intensive period of recording for Rubber Soul. The album marked a significant progression from the band's Merseybeat roots, furthering the musical direction they had first adopted with their late 1964 release, Beatles for Sale. For the first time in their setlist for a tour, they now eschewed any songs from before the Beatles for Sale era. The band chose their 1964 hit "I Feel Fine", sung by John Lennon, to open the shows, while their closing song, Paul McCartney's "I'm Down", became what NME journalist Alan Smith later described as "the 1965 'Twist And Shout'".

Typically for the 1960s, the UK concerts were arranged in a package-tour format, with multiple acts on the bill and two performances held each day. The support acts on the program were the Moody Blues, the Paramounts, Beryl Marsden, Steve Aldo, the Koobas, and the Marionettes. At £1000 per engagement, the Beatles' fee was the highest paid to a performing act in Britain up to that time.

The group's preparation ended with a rehearsal on 1 December at the London flat shared by Neil Aspinall and Mal Evans – the Beatles' long-serving road managers and roadies. Aside from the four band members and their manager, Brian Epstein, the tour personnel comprised only Aspinall, Evans, press officer Tony Barrow and a chauffeur, Alf Bicknell. On the way to Scotland for the first show, Harrison's Gretsch Tennessean fell from the group's car and into the path of a truck, destroying the instrument and leaving him with two guitars for the tour.

== Tour history ==
Wild, ear-tingling screams burst over the auditorium as the curtains parted and the Beatles moved straight into their first number, "I Feel Fine". John sang lead, and he was in top vocal – and humorous – form. From time to time he would throw in a funny facial expression that had the crowd roaring with delight.

— Alan Smith of the NME, reporting on the opening performance of the tour

The opening shows took place at the Odeon Cinema in Glasgow on 2 December. In his feature article covering the first four stops on the itinerary – Glasgow, Newcastle, Liverpool and Manchester – Smith reported that while the fans' reaction did not seem as wild as it had been in previous years, "it's been capacity audiences, screaming [fans] and better-than-ever performances by the group all the way." Part of the reason for the less-frenzied mood surrounding the tour, Smith said, was due to a heavy police presence, which meant that roads around the venues were closed off and crowd numbers were confined to only those attending the concerts.

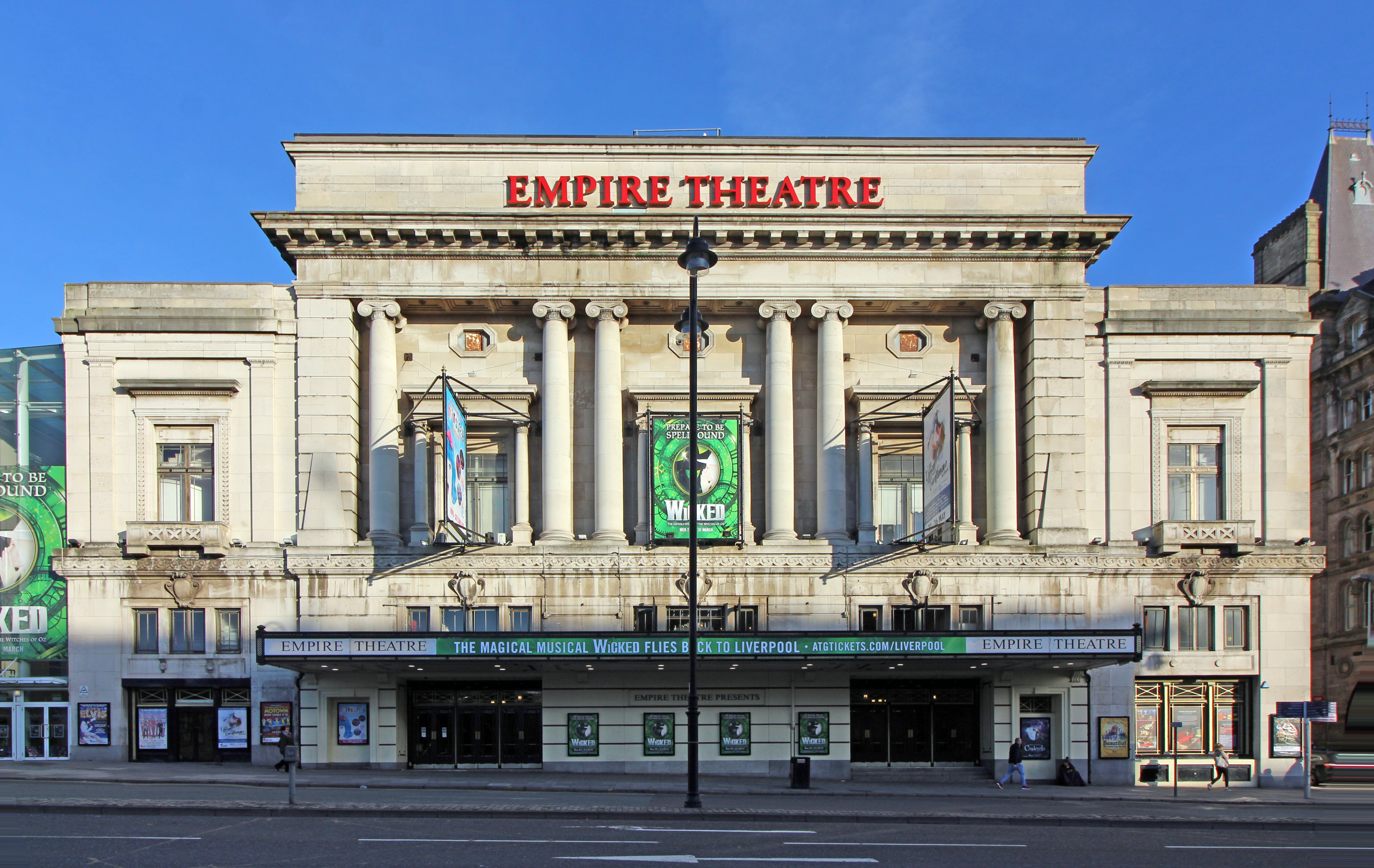
The Liverpool Empire — the venue for the Beatles' final concert in their hometown

The Beatles returned to their hometown of Liverpool on 5 December to play at the Empire Theatre, with their friends and family members among the audience. At the second show that evening, McCartney accompanied the Koobas (on drums) during their performance of "Dizzy Miss Lizzy". Otherwise, McCartney expressed disappointment at the level of police protection, saying: "just lately it's getting ridiculous. There are so many of them about, it ruins the whole atmosphere of enjoyment."

The winter weather hindered the band's progress throughout the tour. In Glasgow, Epstein was forced to change their accommodation to an inner-city hotel, to ensure that the Beatles made it on stage. Travel was affected by snow on the roads around Newcastle, by dense fog in Manchester, and by heavy rain on the way to Birmingham. At the first performance at that city's Odeon Cinema, the Moody Blues extended their set to cover for the Beatles' late arrival.

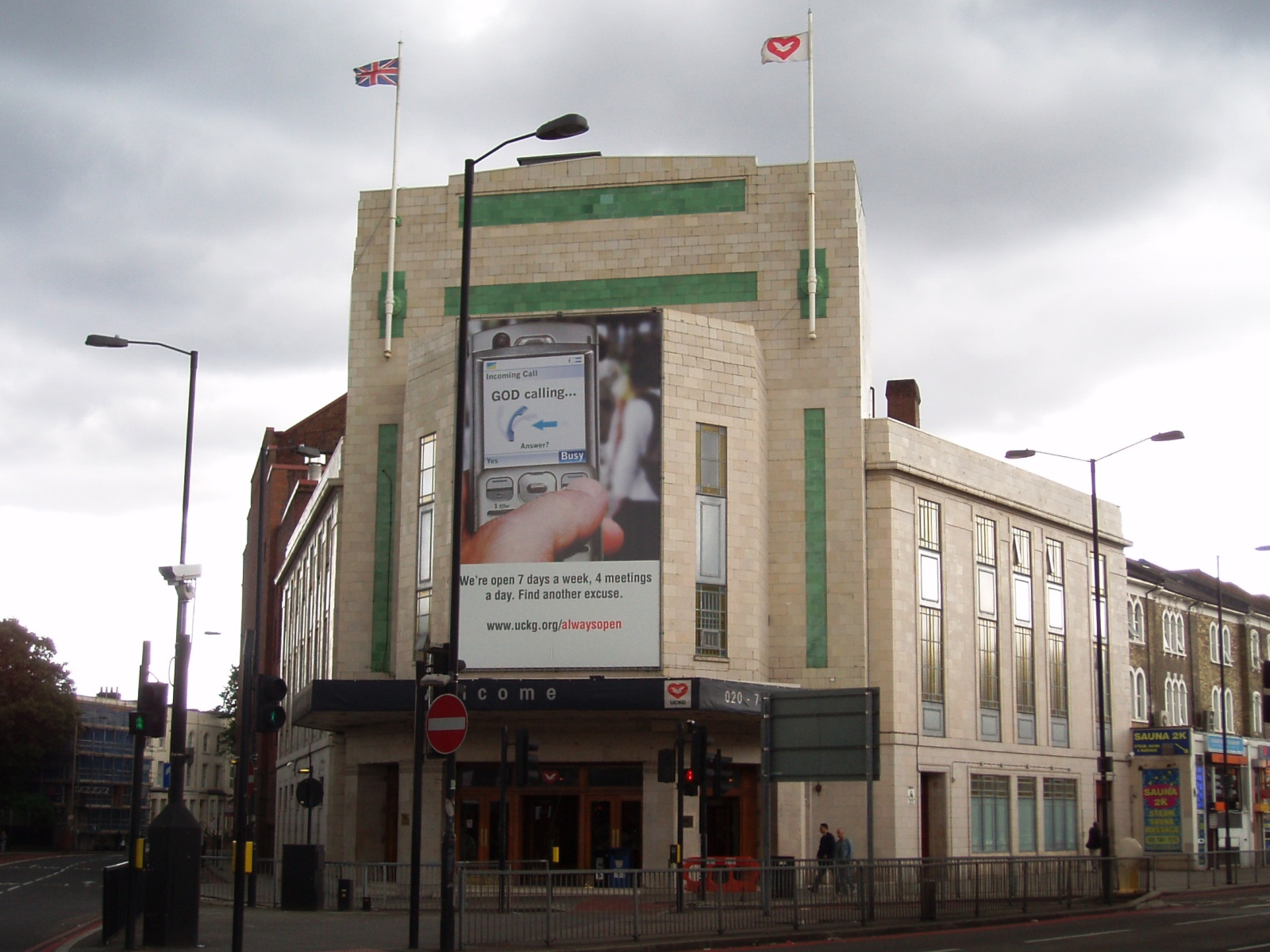
The London shows included two well-received performances at the Astoria (now the Rainbow Theatre) in Finsbury Park.

The Beatles played the first of two London venues, the Hammersmith Odeon, on 10 December – the day the NME announced that its readers had voted them Best British Group and Best World Group for 1965. In the same poll, Lennon won in the "British Vocal Personality" category. The following day, Melody Maker listed Rubber Soul at number 1 on its national albums chart.

Finsbury Park Astoria holds 3,000 people and I swear that almost every one of them has been standing on a seat … They tell me the hysteria and the fan scenes were even worse at Hammersmith last night. I did not think I would say this again but, without question, BEATLEMANIA IS BACK!

— Alan Smith, NME

The 11 December concerts, at the Astoria in Finsbury Park, north London, received what author Barry Miles later described as a "tremendous" reception. Retracting his earlier statement about the growing maturity of the group's fans, Smith wrote: "I have not seen hysteria like this at a Beatles show since the word Beatlemania erupted into headlines … George Harrison staggered off the stage soaking in perspiration as he told me: 'This is one of the most incredible shows we've done. Not just because of the audience, but because they're Londoners!'" Lennon elaborated: "We used to think Londoners had that cool we've-seen-it-all-before outlook but we take it all back!"

The tour ended on 12 December with two performances at the Capitol Cinema in Cardiff. Some 25,000 applications were received for the 5000 tickets. These shows proved to be the final UK concerts the Beatles played outside London, where they went on to perform for the last time at the NME Poll-Winners' Concert in May 1966.

== Set list ==
According to Walter Everett (lead singers appear in parentheses):

1. "Dizzy Miss Lizzy" (John Lennon)
2. "I Feel Fine" (John Lennon)
3. "She's a Woman" (Paul McCartney)
4. "If I Needed Someone" (George Harrison)
5. "Act Naturally" (Ringo Starr)
6. "Nowhere Man" (Lennon, with McCartney and Harrison)
7. "Baby's in Black" (Lennon and McCartney)
8. "Help!" (Lennon)
9. "We Can Work It Out" (McCartney)
10. "Yesterday" (McCartney)
11. "Day Tripper" (Lennon and McCartney)
12. "I'm Down" (McCartney)

== Tour dates ==
According to Barry Miles and Walter Everett:

Date	City	Country	Venue
3 December 1965 (2 shows)	Glasgow	Scotland	Odeon Cinema
4 December 1965 (2 shows)	Newcastle upon Tyne	England	Newcastle City Hall
5 December 1965 (2 shows)	Liverpool	England	Liverpool Empire Theatre
7 December 1965 (2 shows)	Manchester	England	Ardwick ABC Cinema
8 December 1965 (2 shows)	Sheffield	England	Gaumont Cinema
9 December 1965 (2 shows)	Birmingham	England	Birmingham Odeon
10 December 1965 (2 shows)	London	England	Hammersmith Odeon
11 December 1965 (2 shows)	London	England	Odeon Astoria
12 December 1965 (2 shows)	Cardiff	Wales	Capitol Cinema

== See also ==
- List of the Beatles' live performances

== Sources ==
- Castleman, Harry; Podrazik, Walter J. (1976). All Together Now: The First Complete Beatles Discography 1961–1975. New York, NY: Ballantine Books. ISBN 0-345-25680-8.
- Everett, Walter (2001). The Beatles as Musicians: The Quarry Men through Rubber Soul. New York, NY: Oxford University Press. ISBN 0-19-514105-9.
- MacDonald, Ian (1998). Revolution in the Head: The Beatles' Records and the Sixties. London: Pimlico. ISBN 978-0-7126-6697-8.
- Miles, Barry (2001). The Beatles Diary Volume 1: The Beatles Years. London: Omnibus Press. ISBN 0-7119-8308-9.
- Rodriguez, Robert (2012). Revolver: How the Beatles Reimagined Rock 'n' Roll. Milwaukee, WI: Backbeat Books. ISBN 978-1-61713-009-0.
- Schaffner, Nicholas (1978). The Beatles Forever. New York, NY: McGraw-Hill. ISBN 0-07-055087-5.
- Unterberger, Richie (2006). The Unreleased Beatles: Music & Film. San Francisco, CA: Backbeat Books. ISBN 978-0-87930-892-6.
- Winn, John C. (2008). Way Beyond Compare: The Beatles' Recorded Legacy, Volume One, 1962–1965. New York, NY: Three Rivers Press. ISBN 978-0-3074-5239-9.
- Womack, Kenneth (2014). The Beatles Encyclopedia: Everything Fab Four. Santa Barbara, CA: ABC-CLIO. ISBN 978-0-313-39171-2.
