= Arthur Unger =

American entertainment journalist

- Born: 1924; Brooklyn, New York, U.S.
- Died: July 9, 2004 (aged 79–80); Paris, France
- Occupations: Journalist and author
- Years active: 1943–2004
- Known for: Datebook

Arthur Unger (1924 — 9 July 2004) was an American entertainment journalist who reviewed movies and television shows for The Christian Science Monitor and the American teen magazine Ingenue.

He edited and published several magazines such as Mechanix Illustrated and Datebook, and became famous for republishing the controversial "More popular than Jesus" interview with the Beatles.

Before becoming a journalist, Unger served as an Army cryptographer in the Pacific Theater in World War II.

His artifacts are stored at the State Historical Society of Missouri, including recordings, transcripts and notes from his interviews with celebrities, his writing, Beatles publications and personal materials.
