= God (John Lennon song) =

- Cover to promo single issued by Odeon in Spain in 1988

Song by John Lennon

from the album John Lennon/Plastic Ono Band
- Released: 11 December 1970
- Recorded: 26 September – 9 October 1970
- Genre: Soft rock
- Length: 4:09
- Label: Apple/EMI
- Songwriter: John Lennon
- Producers: John Lennon, Yoko Ono, Phil Spector

"God" is a song by the English musician John Lennon, from his first post-Beatles solo album, John Lennon/Plastic Ono Band. The album was released on 11 December 1970 in the United States and the United Kingdom. The song references the Beatles, the world's religions, and various cultural phenomena. As with the rest of the album, Ringo Starr plays drums and Klaus Voormann plays bass guitar; in addition, Billy Preston joins Lennon in playing piano on the track.

== Recording ==
"God" was recorded at Abbey Road Studios in October 1970 with Ringo Starr on drums, Klaus Voormann on bass guitar, and Billy Preston on piano. The final version of the song was recorded on 9 October 1970, Lennon's 30th birthday.

According to Voormann, Lennon initially introduced the song on guitar before later shifting to piano during the recording sessions. Lennon later said he wanted the song to have a gospel feel, but felt that the early arrangements did not achieve the sound he wanted. Preston was subsequently brought in to perform piano on the final recording.

Lennon described the arrangement as intentionally simple, stating that he preferred "simple rock and nothing else".

In the 2008 documentary Classic Albums: John Lennon/Plastic Ono Band, engineers and musicians involved in the recording discussed the song's sparse arrangement and Starr's varying tom drum fills throughout the "I don't believe in" sequence. Starr later said the album was among the recording sessions he was most proud of.

== Composition and meaning ==
There are three sections in the song. Lennon later said he preferred writing songs drawn from personal experience, and viewed "God" as part of a more autobiographical style that emerged during the making of John Lennon/Plastic Ono Band.

In the first section, Lennon describes God as "a concept by which we measure our pain". Lennon later said the line emerged from discussions with primal therapy founder Arthur Janov about belief and emotional pain.

In the second section, Lennon chants a list of things he does not believe in, ending by stating that he just believes in himself and his wife (Yoko). He rejects magic, the I Ching, the Bible, tarot, Hitler, Jesus, Kennedy, the Buddha, mantra, the Gita, yoga, kings, Elvis, and Zimmerman (Bob Dylan). The sequence culminates in the declaration "I don't believe in Beatles". Lennon later said the sequence of "I don't believe in" statements developed spontaneously during the songwriting process, and described the Beatles as "another myth".

The final section describes Lennon's change since the break-up of the Beatles. While the Beatles were effectively his family throughout the 1960s, he refers to Paul McCartney's 1965 Beatles song "Yesterday", and states that he is no longer the "Dreamweaver" or "The Walrus", but just "John". Lennon later said the phrase "the dream is over" referred not only to the Beatles but also to the broader ideals of the 1960s counterculture. Lennon also said, "If there is a God, we're all it".

Especially given its position near the end of side two, "God" can be considered to be, in the words of writer Nicholas Schaffner, the album's "Big Statement". Lennon had a goal of denouncing idols he believed to be false, as well as disassociating himself from icons, roles, and beliefs he had once embraced.

In 1979, music writer Greil Marcus proclaimed that "John's singing on the last verse" of the track "may be the finest in all of rock." And in his 1979 volume Stranded: Rock and Roll for a Desert Island, the only solo Lennon work that Marcus selected for his 45-page essential discography was "God".

== Legacy ==
The Irish rock band U2 included a track called "God Part II" on their 1988 album Rattle and Hum. Variously an homage, an answer song, and a riposte to the original, it shows an affection for Lennon but disagrees with his central premise. Yet another response to those came from the Christian rock artist Larry Norman with the song "God Part III" on the 1991 album Stranded in Babylon.

English musician David Bowie, a friend and one-time musical collaborator with Lennon, wrote and recorded the song "Afraid", which was included in his 2002 album Heathen; one of the song's lyrics, "I believe in Beatles", is a rejoinder to Lennon singing "I don't believe in Beatles" in "God".

== Personnel ==
The musicians who performed on the original recording were as follows:

- John Lennon – vocals, tack piano
- Billy Preston – grand piano
- Ringo Starr – drums
- Klaus Voormann – bass guitar

== See also ==
- Religious views of the Beatles
