= Jimmy Staggs =

American DJ and record store owner (1935–2007)

- Jimmy Staggs, AKA Jim Stagg-WCFL, 1966.
- Born: Jimmy Pearson Staggs; October 7, 1935; Bessemer, Alabama
- Died: November 6, 2007 (aged 72); Lake Forest, Illinois
- Spouse: Valene Staggs
- Children: 4
- Career
- Stations: WYDE AM (Birmingham); WIBG (Philadelphia); KYA (San Francisco); WOKY (Milwaukee); KYW (Cleveland); WCFL (Chicago); WMAQ (Chicago)

Jimmy Pearson Staggs (October 7, 1935 – November 6, 2007), also known as Jim Stagg, was an American disc jockey and record store owner in Chicago, Illinois.

== Early life ==
Staggs was born October 7, 1935, in Bessemer, Alabama. Staggs was a stellar student and athlete in high school who passed on a football scholarship to Georgia Tech. Staggs later graduated from the University of Alabama. Jim was the featured vocal soloist with the Crimson Tide orchestra during his college years.

== Radio career ==
Staggs' radio career began in Birmingham (on WYDE AM). From there, it was on to Philadelphia (on WIBG), San Francisco (on KYA), and Milwaukee (on WOKY) before his stint at KYW, Cleveland.

During the 1960 presidential campaign, Jim, who had the "morning drive" airshift, and fellow KYA staffer Bob Mitchell had some fun with a parody of the Huntley/Brinkley News report. Jim played Ned Nutly to Mitchell's Willie Winkly at the debate between candidates "John Finnerty" and "Nick Dixon".

In 1965, KYW program director Ken Draper moved to WCFL to assume the same duties. Staggs and many other station employees, both on and off air, including Dick Orkin, Jim Runyon and Jerry G. (Bishop) eagerly moved from KYW in Cleveland to WCFL in Chicago.

As his radio career wound down, Staggs hosted innovative talk and music shows on WMAQ-AM.

== WCFL career ==
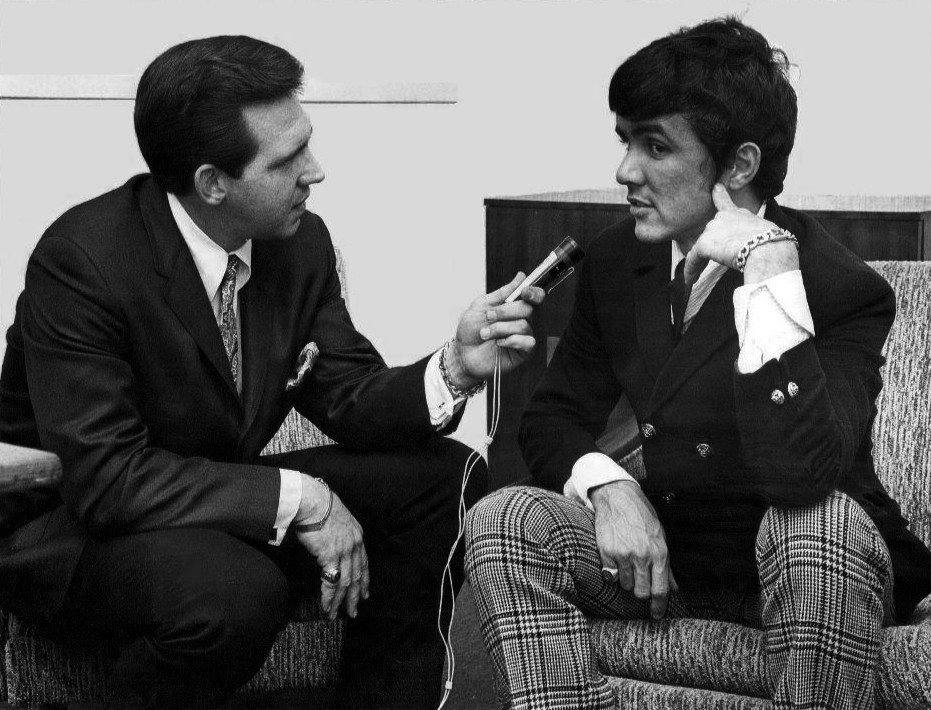
Staggs interviewing Dave Clark of The Dave Clark Five in 1966

At WCFL, the "Voice of Labor", Staggs did the "afternoon drive" (the station's high-profile 3 to 6 pm slot) shift. He referred to the studio call-in line as the "Stagg Line" and produced a feature titled "Stagg's Starbeat" – in-depth, provocative, and insightful interviews with local, national and international music celebrities. Staggs interviewed nearly every major rock star of the 1960s, including Neil Diamond, Ray Charles, Frank Sinatra, The Rolling Stones, the Supremes, The Monkees, and Simon & Garfunkel.

There was also a weekly column on music and the entertainment industry, the "Stagg Line", which appeared in Sunday editions of the Chicago Sun-Times.

Jim became the Chicago chairman of Let Us Vote (LUV), a youth campaign which began in late 1968 to establish the minimum voting age as 18 in all states. Joey Bishop was honorary national chairman and songwriters Tommy Boyce and Bobby Hart contributed a campaign song. Everyone's efforts resulted in the Twenty-sixth Amendment to the United States Constitution being ratified in 1971.

While serving as WCFL's music director, Staggs authorized the station to play the controversial "Ballad of John and Yoko"; he later became the station's program director.

Staggs eschewed the flashy theatrics of other Top-40 radio hosts in favor a straightforward rock and roll show that kept the focus on the music. His close-of-program line echos that: "Music is my business. I hope my business was your pleasure."

== Beatles coverage ==
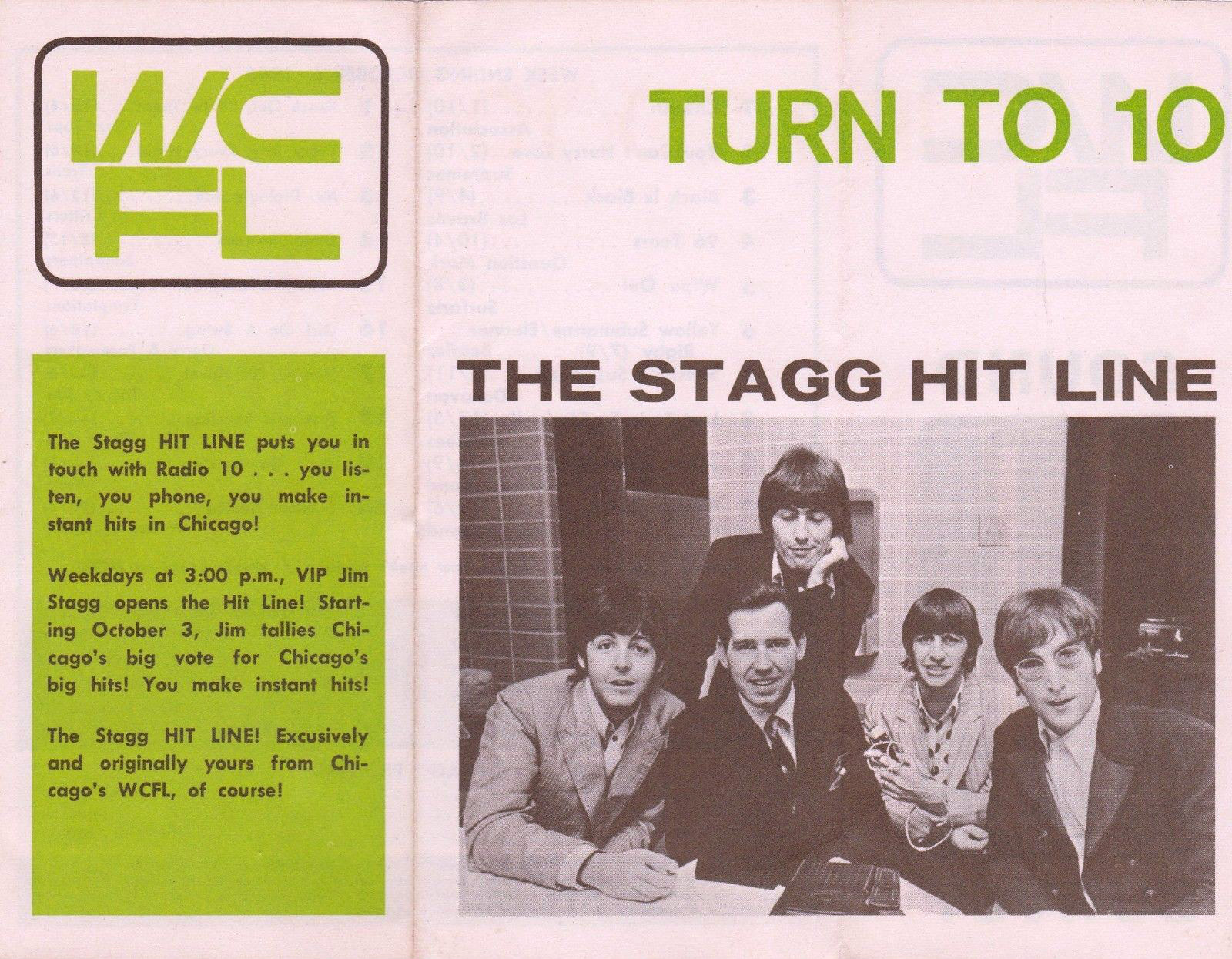
The Beatles with Jimmy Staggs/Jim Stagg. WCFL Sound 10 Survey, October, 1966

Jim was among a handful of reporters who traveled on The Beatles' private plane during the band's 1964 U.S. tour. The reporters had press credentials for the tour and at times were pursued by the same frenzied teenage girls who were trying to get closer to their idols. Staggs was once again tapped to cover the Beatles in 1965, but this time for WCFL. For this tour, there were so many reporters covering the Beatles coast to coast, a separate plane was needed for members of the press. Staggs updated Beatle fans every hour on the WCFL airwaves during this tour. He also covered The Beatles' third tour in 1966, traveling with the band from London to Chicago. On all three tours, Staggs captured, on tape, The Beatles' reactions and comments in every city and after each concert.

== Post-radio career ==
Staggs left the radio business in 1975, as the medium's so-called Golden Age finally gave out, and started a chain of record stores in the northern suburbs of Chicago. Staggs opened a record store called Record City, which eventually became a chain with locations in Lake Zurich, Skokie, Glenview, and Northbrook, with two more outlets in Orlando, Florida. The last Record City, in Lake Zurich, closed in 2005.

Staggs also became a licensed realtor, working with Keller Williams Realty in Libertyville, and started a business, along with his wife Valene and daughter Dina, called Looking Back Productions, that captured the times of someone's life and special events using video montages and interview techniques.

He made a temporary return to radio via the WJMK airwaves as part of the WJMK Rock 'n' Roll Reunion on April 11, 1985 as a guest, along with fellow former WCFL DJs Ron Britain and Barney Pip to share memories of the station and their careers in radio.

== Personal ==
Staggs died on November 6, 2007, at his Lake Forest, Illinois home of complications from esophageal cancer. Staggs and his wife of 45 years, Valene, had four children—son Patrick, and daughters Kara, Lisa, and Dina. At the time of his death, Staggs had five grandchildren, Dylan, Matthew, Colin, Nadine, and Aimee
