= Datebook (magazine) =

U.S. teen-oriented magazine

Datebook was a teen-oriented magazine, edited and published in the US by Art Unger and Danny Fields.

It is most famous for republishing the controversial "More popular than Jesus" interview with the Beatles in its September 1966 issue.
