= Hambleton =

Hambleton may refer to:

== Places ==
=== England ===
- Hambleton District, a former local government district of North Yorkshire
  - Hambleton Ales, a brewery originally based in Hambleton
- Hambleton, Lancashire, a village and civil parish
- Hambleton, Rutland, a village and civil parish
  - Hambleton Peninsula, the peninsula where the village is situated
- Hambleton, Ryedale, a hamlet on the borders of the former Hambleton and Ryedale districts of North Yorkshire
- Hambleton, Selby, a village and civil parish of North Yorkshire
- Hambleton Hills, a range of hills in North Yorkshire, England
  - Black Hambleton, the highest peak in the range

=== United States ===
- Hambleton, West Virginia, a town

== People with the surname ==
- Albert Hambleton (1857–1922), American politician in Iowa
- Aman Hambleton (born 1992), Canadian chess grandmaster
- Greg Hambleton, Canadian music entrepreneur
- Herbert Hambleton (1896–1985), British soldier
- Hugh Hambleton (1922–1995), Canadian and British economist and spy
- Iceal Hambleton (1918–2004), USAF navigator and electronic warfare officer
- Peter Hambleton (born 1960), New Zealand actor
- Richard Hambleton (1952–2017), Canadian artist
- Ronald Hambleton (1917–2015), Canadian broadcaster
- Samuel Hambleton (United States Navy officer) (1777–1851), officer in the U.S. Navy who served during the War of 1812
- Samuel Hambleton (Maryland congressman) (1812–1886), American politician
- Steve Hambleton (born 1961), Australian doctor

== Other ==
- USS Hambleton (DD-455), a US Navy destroyer
- Hambleton Royal Gold Cup, an English horse race run between the 1700s and 1770s

== See also ==
- Hambledon (disambiguation)
