= Hambleton Hall, Rutland =

Hambleton Hall
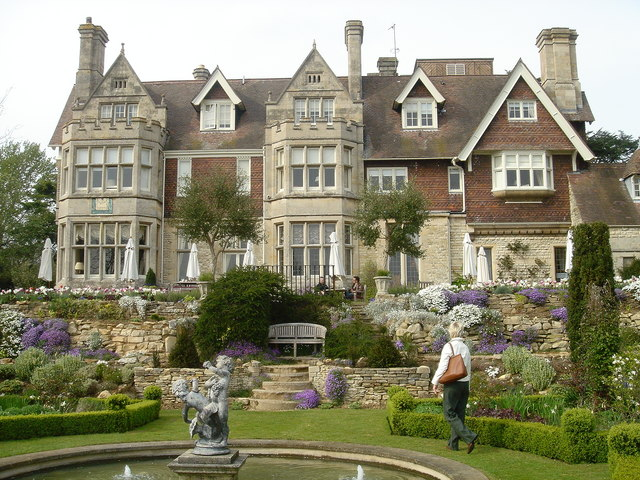
- Interactive map of Hambleton Hall

Restaurant information
- Rating: (Michelin Guide 2022)
- Location: Oakham, Rutland, England
- Coordinates: 52.6575°N 0.6682°W
- Website: www.hambletonhall.com

Hambleton Hall is a hotel and restaurant located in the village of Hambleton close to Oakham, Rutland, England. The restaurant has held one star in the Michelin Guide since 1982.

The Hall was built in 1881 as a hunting box by Walter Marshall who left it to his sister, Eva Astley Paston Cooper. She was a socialite who gathered a salon including Noël Coward, Malcolm Sargent and Charles Scott-Moncrieff.

The hall has overlooked Rutland Water since the reservoir's construction in the 1970s.

The building was converted into a country house hotel in 1979/80 by Tim and Stefa Hart. The hotel has held a Michelin Star since 1982. Hambleton Hall has been named Luxury Hotel of the Year in The Good Hotel Guide, 2018.

== Walter Marshall ==
Walter Gore Marshall was born in 1845 in London. His father was George Marshall who owned the large London shipping firm of George Marshall and Sons. He had five sisters and one brother.

George Marshall was born in Mustoe, County Durham, on 18 January 1802. On 23 February 1836, he married Elizabeth Helen Gore in Woodford, Essex. He was a ship owner with offices in Phillpot Lane in the City of London. He lived in London but, with his family growing up, he purchased Little Woodcote House, Beddington, Surrey. George and Walter also entered the shipping company George Marshall & Sons becoming partners. On retirement he and his wife moved to St Leonards in Sussex. He died there in 1877.

Walter was educated at Winchester College with his brother George and obtained his degree from Oxford. He eventually became a partner in his father's shipping firm with his brother George. In 1877 his father died and left a great deal of money a large part of which was inherited by Walter. Shortly after this he travelled to the US and wrote a book about his travels called Through America which is still frequently quoted by historians as an accurate description of the country at that time.

In 1881, Walter built Hambleton Hall but he remained unmarried. He participated in hunting with the Warwickshire, Cottesmore, Quorn, Belvoir or Fernie hounds. His friend Walter Robert Verney wrote the book called Annals of the Warwickshire Hunt which mentions Walter several times. Walter was also known to be very gregarious and attended many social events around the local area. He took a particular interest in the parish church of St Andrew in Hambleton and is credited with making major improvements to the building and purchasing the stained glass windows.

Later in his life, Walter became one of the directors of the Cannon Brewery Company and owned a large number of shares in this firm.

In 1899, while on a social visit to friends at Upton House, Banbury he contracted the flu. This was followed by pneumonia and shortly afterwards he died. A large funeral was held at St Andrew's, Hambleton and he was buried in the churchyard there. In his will he left Hambleton Hall and a large number of his shares to his youngest sister Evangeline Astley Cooper.

=== Gallery ===
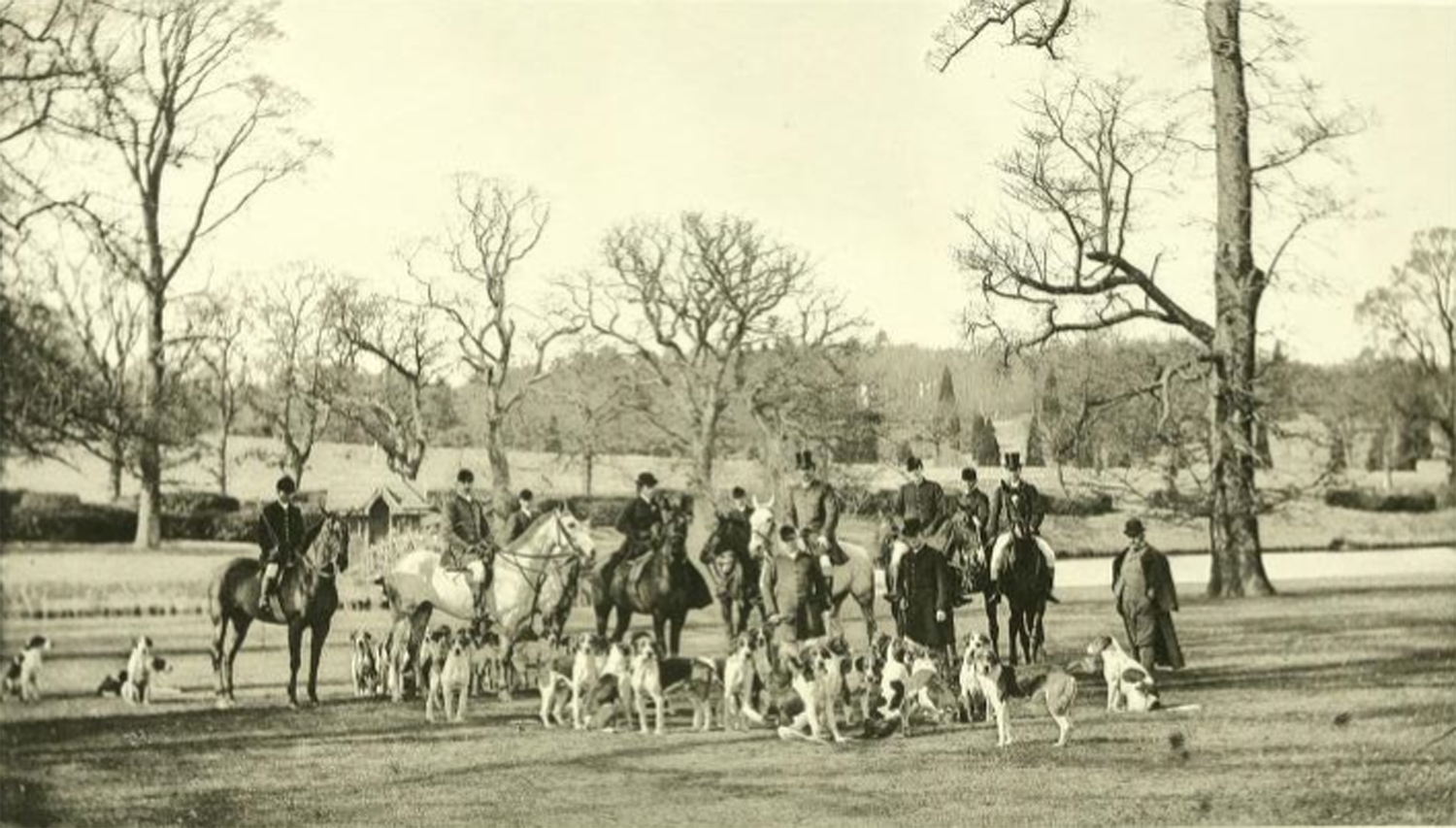
The Warwickshire Hunt in which Walter was a participant, 1896

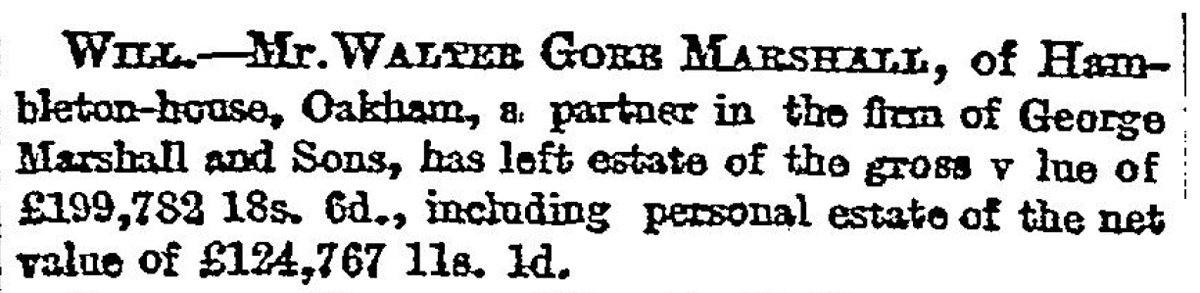
Notice about Walter Marshall's estate

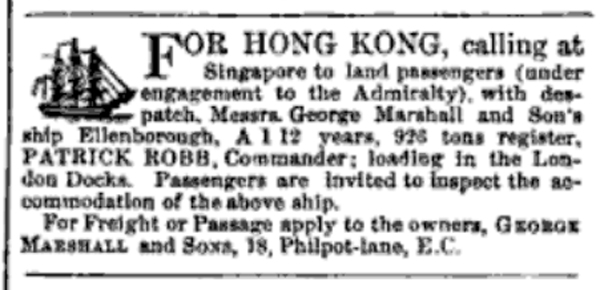
Advertisement for George Marshall and Son shipping firm

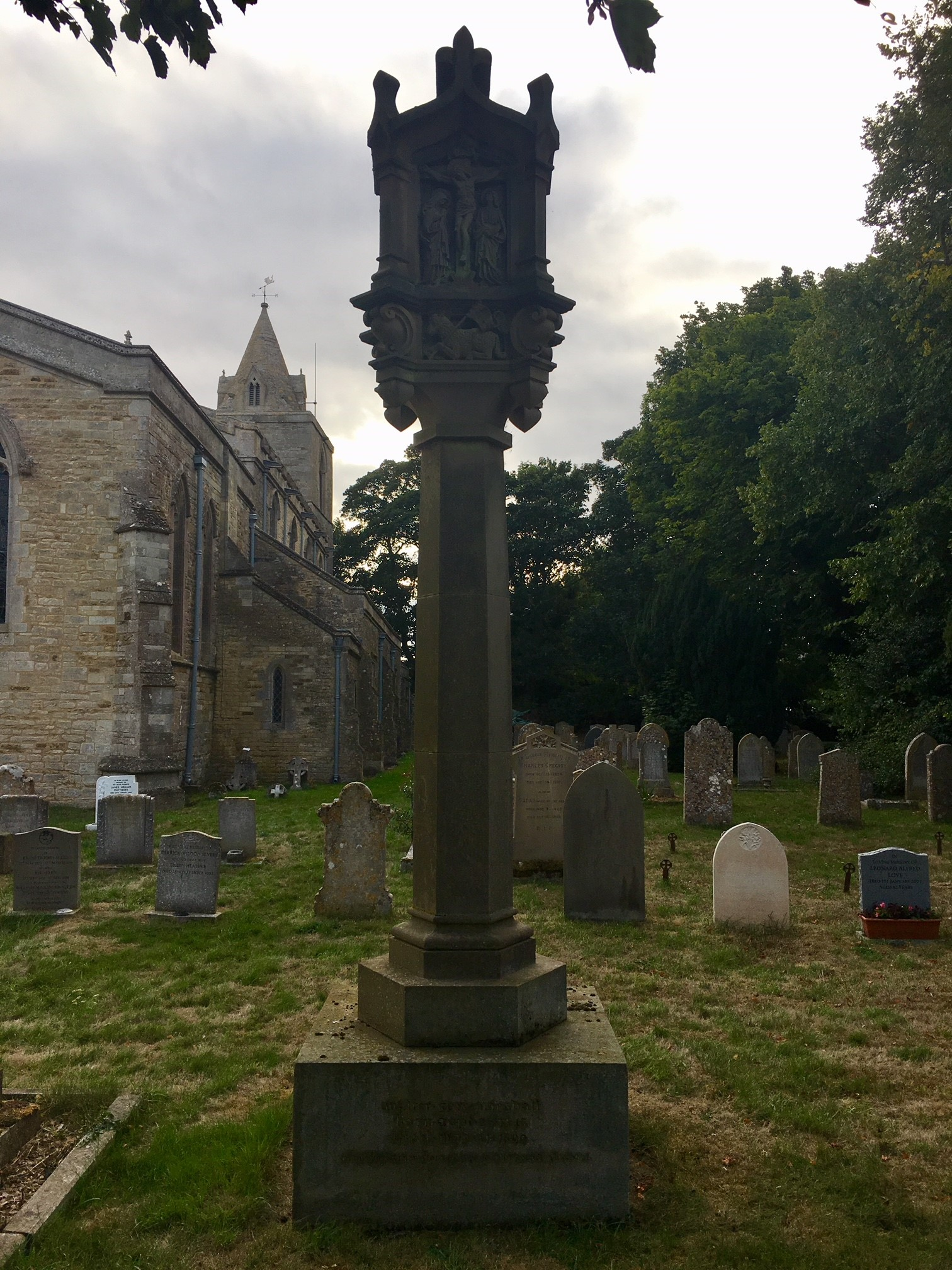
Grave of Walter Marshall in the graveyard of St Andrew, Hambleton

== The Astley Coopers ==
House party at Hambleton Hall in 1920. Mrs Astley Cooper is in the centre and Noël Coward is on the bottom right of the photo.

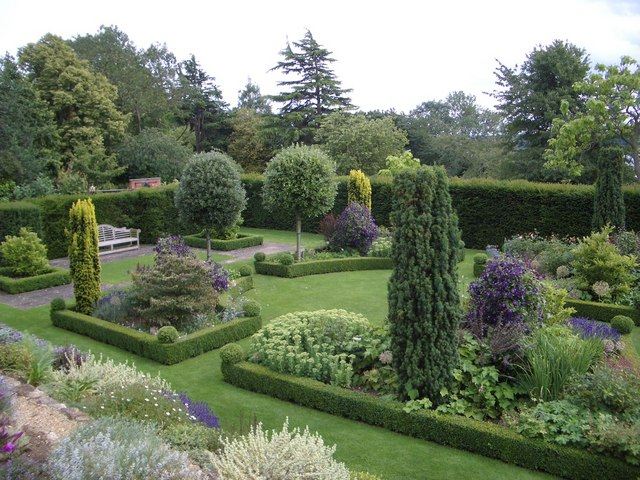
The gardens at Hambleton Hall

Evangeline (Eva) Julia Marshall, Walter's sister who inherited the house, was born in Croydon, Surrey in 1854. In 1877 she married Clement Astley Cooper who was the son of Sir Astley Cooper, 2nd Baronet. He was a retired Captain in the military. The couple lived at a large house called "The Lockers" in Hemel Hempstead which was close to Clement's ancestral home. In 1899 when Eva inherited Hambleton Hall the couple moved and came to live at Hambleton.

Eva Astley Cooper liked to entertain and she invited many young celebrities to the Hall including Noël Coward, Malcolm Sargent, Charles Scott Moncrieff and the painter Philip Streatfeild. Coward enjoyed his many visits to Hambleton Hall and wrote about them in his autobiography. His feelings about the house are described as follows;

It was a pleasant experience staying in a well-run country house. The trappings of life there were new to me: a fire in my bedroom every night, dinner clothes laid out neatly on the bed, brass cans of hot water and deep baths encased in shiny brown wood. People came over and lunched or dined occasionally. A flurry of wheels on the drive announced them and the murmur of different voices echoed up from the hall as I grandly descended the polished oak staircase very careful not to slip in my new patent shoes.

During the winter visits I used to go to meets in the dog cart driving myself and following the hunt for as long as the pony consented to gallop …

Small memories are most insistent and I like to catch again for a moment, the feel of the sharp spring air as we drove home at night after a concert, the smell of a wood fire in the library where we discussed over hot soup and sandwiches the triumphs of the evening. All the warm comfortable ingredients of country house life were there, the very unfamiliarity of the atmosphere enhancing its charm for me. This I reflected was my rightful sphere and I would go upstairs to bed undress and brush my teeth, still, until sleep closed down upon me, accurate in my performance of a country gentleman.

In 1906, Mrs Astley Cooper's daughter Monica was married in a lavish wedding held at Hambleton Hall. Eva died in 1944 and the Hall was put on the market.

== After the War ==
After the War, the Hall was inhabited in turn by Lord Trent, Dr Brockbank and Major and Mrs Hoare. It has been owned by Tim and Stefa Hart since 1979. The hall is a 17-bedroom, four red-AA-star hotel.
