= Pickhill =

Village in North Yorkshire, England

Coordinates: 54°14′45″N 1°28′14″W

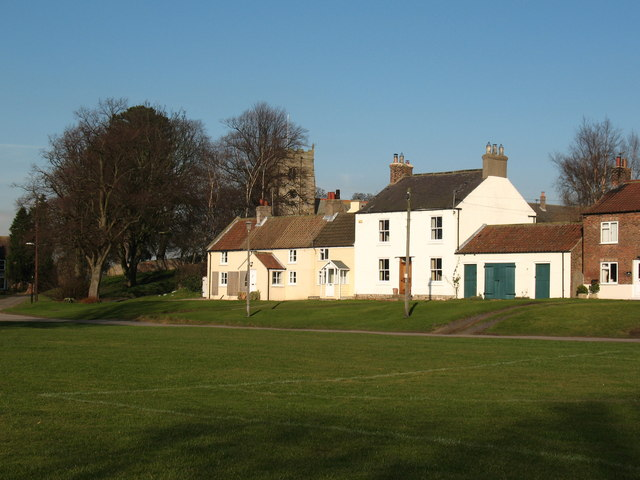
- Pickhill Village Green

- Location within North Yorkshire
- Population: 401 (2011 census)
- OS grid reference: SE346836
- Civil parish: Pickhill with Roxby
- Unitary authority: North Yorkshire
- Ceremonial county: North Yorkshire
- Region: Yorkshire and the Humber
- Country: England
- Sovereign state: United Kingdom
- Post town: THIRSK
- Postcode district: YO7 4
- Police: North Yorkshire
- Fire: North Yorkshire
- Ambulance: Yorkshire
- UK Parliament: Thirsk and Malton

Pickhill is a village in North Yorkshire, England, 6 miles (10 km) west of Thirsk. It is a part of the civil parish of Pickhill with Roxby.

== History ==
The Roman road, Dere Street, passed close to the village following the route of the modern A1(M) motorway.

The name Pickhill possibly derives from the Old English Picahalh meaning 'Pica's nook of land', or pīchalh meaning 'pointed hill nook of land'.

The village is mentioned in the Domesday Book as Picala. The manor at the time of the Norman invasion was split between Sprot and Thor. Afterwards it passed to Count Alan of Brittany. Up to the 16th century, the manor was largely owned by the Neville family, with some having been given to Fountains Abbey. Thereafter it was split in two and was the possession of the Byerley and Meynell families until the 18th century.

Pickhill with Roxby was a large ancient parish, which comprised the townships of Ainderby Quernhow, Holme, Howe, Pickhill with Roxby, Sinderby and Swainby with Allerthorpe. All these townships became separate civil parishes in 1866.

The village used to have a station in the North Eastern Railway region on the Ripon to Northallerton Line. The old Station House can be found on Cross Lane. It was functioning between March 1875 and September 1959.

On 22 September 2024 Out Together held "Out on the Farm", their first joint event at a farm in the area, which celebrated LGBTQ people in rural areas of North Yorkshire, and provided a safe space for them to meet.

=== Roxby ===
Roxby is a deserted medieval village about 2 miles (3 km) west of the village, recorded in 1198. By the 20th century it was reduced to a single farmhouse, Roxby House. The farmhouse was demolished in 1994 to make way for the construction of the A1(M) motorway.

== Governance ==
From 1974 to 2023 it was part of the Hambleton District, it is now administered by the unitary North Yorkshire Council.

Until 2023, Pickhill was part of the Richmond (Yorks) parliamentary constituency. It was removed and added to the expanded Thirsk and Malton Constituency, in part due to areas from that constituency being created into a new seat of Wetherby and Easingwold.

== Geography ==
The village is located a mile east of the A1(M), and its nearest neighbours are Sinderby 1.1 miles (1.8 km) to the south, Holme 1.2 miles (1.9 km) to the south-east and Ainderby Quernhow 1.8 miles (2.9 km) to the south. Pickhill Beck runs through the village before joining the nearby River Swale. The 2001 UK Census recorded the population as 411, of which 318 were over the age of sixteen years. There were 157 dwellings of which 112 were detached.

== Education ==
The village has one school, Pickhill CE Primary School, which is within the catchment area of Thirsk School for secondary education.

== Religion ==
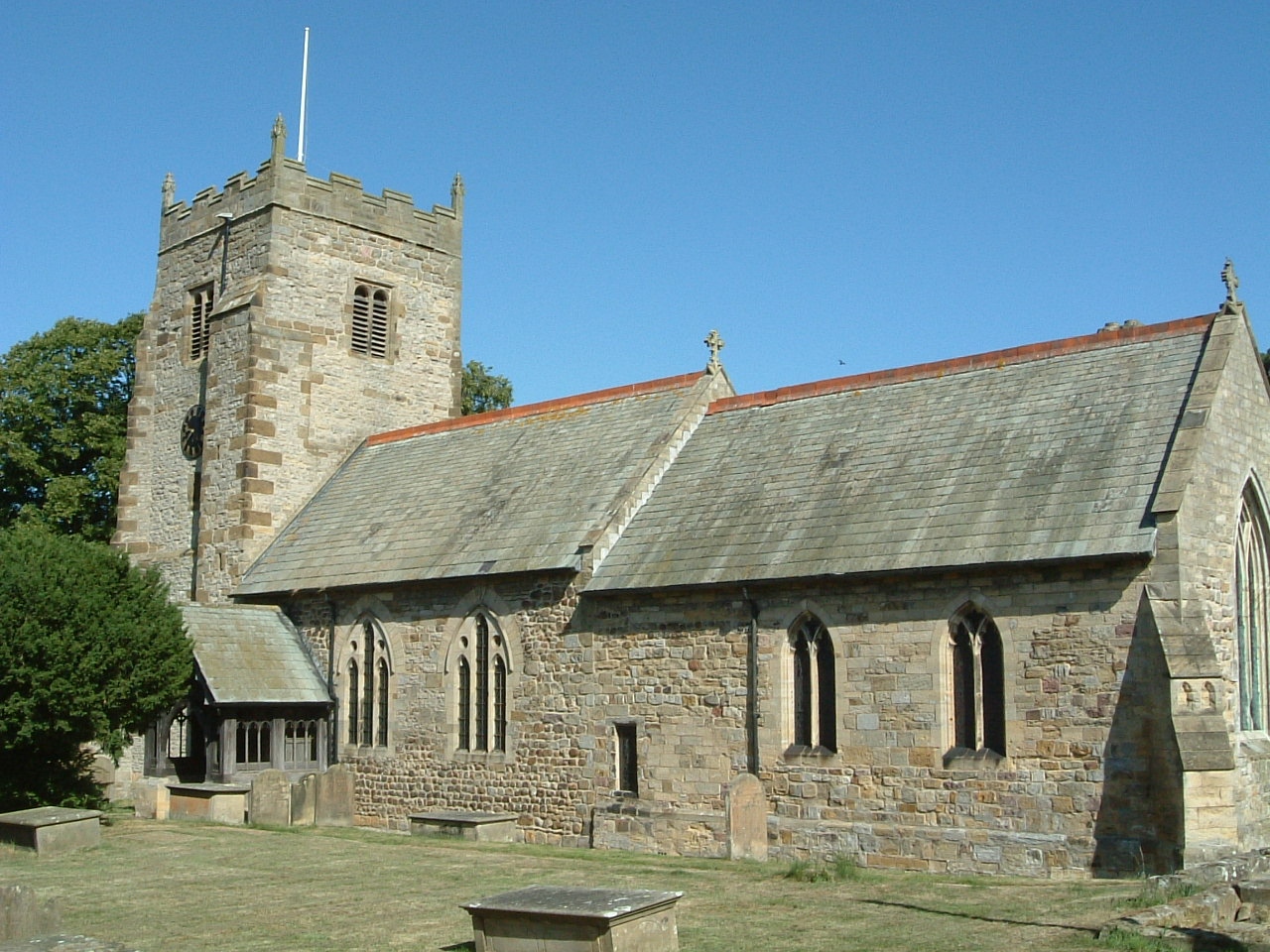
All Saints church, Pickhill

All Saints' Church, Pickhill was built around the 12th century, it is a Grade II* listed building that has been restored several times. There was a Wesleyan Chapel erected in the village around 1864, now disused.

== See also ==
- Listed buildings in Pickhill
