= Hambledon =

Hambledon may refer to:

- Hambledon, Hampshire, England
  - Hambledon Club, was a notable progenitor of the game of cricket
- Hambledon, Surrey, England
- Hambledon Hill, Dorset, England
- HMS Hambledon, the name of more than one ship of the British Royal Navy

== See also ==
- Hambleden, Buckinghamshire, England
  - Hambleden Lock
  - Hambleden Mill
- Hambleton (disambiguation)
