= Holme, North Yorkshire =

Village and civil parish in North Yorkshire, England

Coordinates: 54.2349°N 1.45857°W

Holme
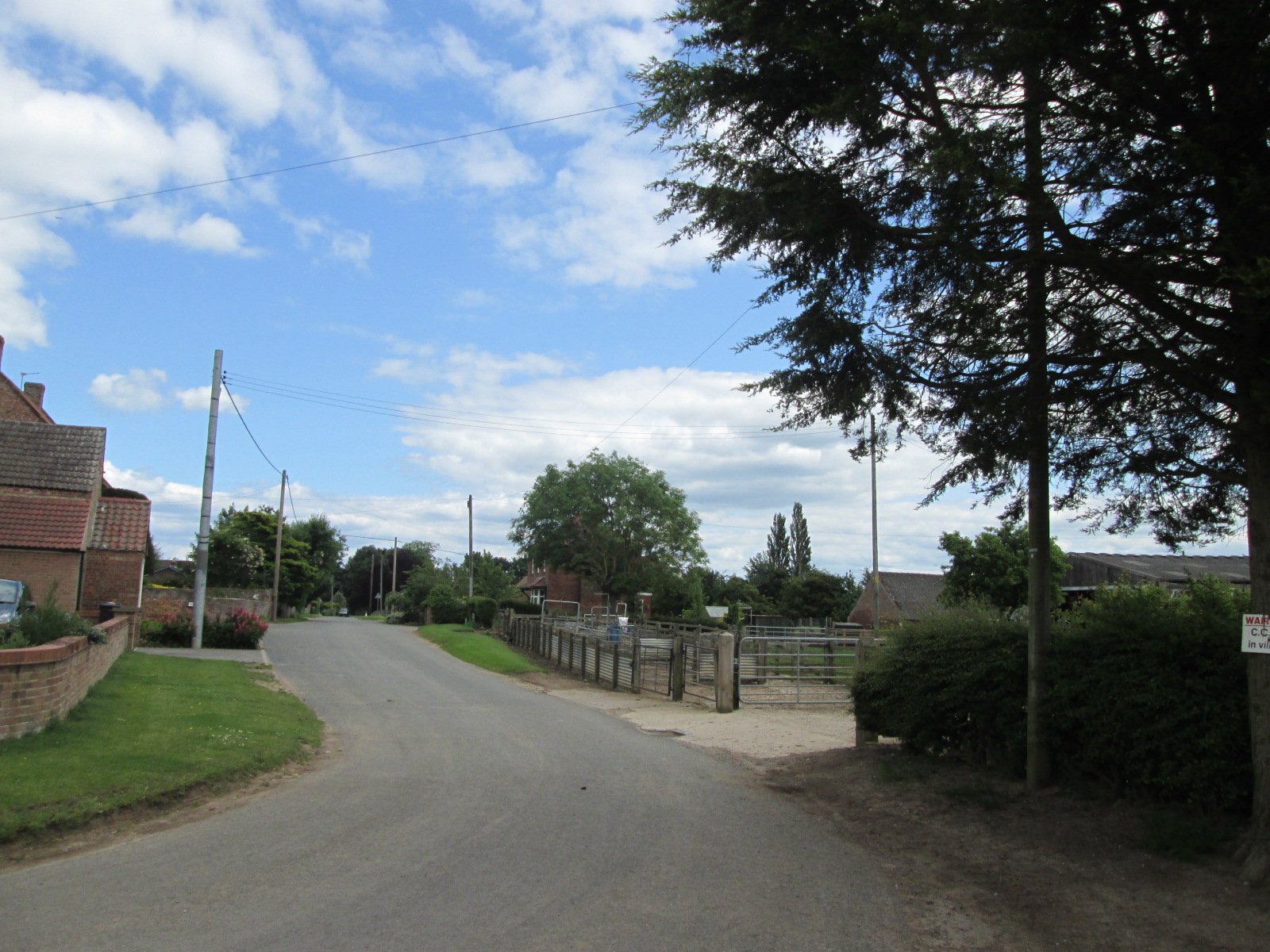
- Street in Holme village

- Location within North Yorkshire
- Population: 60 (2014)
- OS grid reference: SE353822
- Civil parish: Holme
- Unitary authority: North Yorkshire
- Ceremonial county: North Yorkshire
- Region: Yorkshire and the Humber
- Country: England
- Sovereign state: United Kingdom
- Post town: THIRSK
- Postcode district: YO7
- Police: North Yorkshire
- Fire: North Yorkshire
- Ambulance: Yorkshire

Holme (or Holme on Swale) is a small village and civil parish in North Yorkshire, England. It is located near Pickhill, Sinderby and Ainderby Quernhow, on the west bank of the River Swale. The population of the civil parish was estimated at 60 in 2014.

Hambleton Ales is a small brewery which started life in Holme. It has now moved to Melmerby.

Holme was historically a township in the ancient parish of Pickhill with Roxby in the North Riding of Yorkshire. At the time of the Domesday Book in 1086 it belonged to the Bishop of Durham as part of his manor of Hutton Conyers and Howgrave. The township formed a detached part of the wapentake of Allertonshire, and retained a detached part at Howgrave, 3 miles (5 km) west of the village, apparently only a single farm, into the 19th century. The township was for that reason referred to as Holme cum Howgrave. Holme became a separate civil parish in 1866. From 1974 to 2023 it was part of the Hambleton District, it is now administered by the unitary North Yorkshire Council.

== See also ==
- Listed buildings in Holme, North Yorkshire
