= Normanton Hall =

Demolished country house at Normanton, Rutland

Coordinates: 52.6462°N 0.6206°W

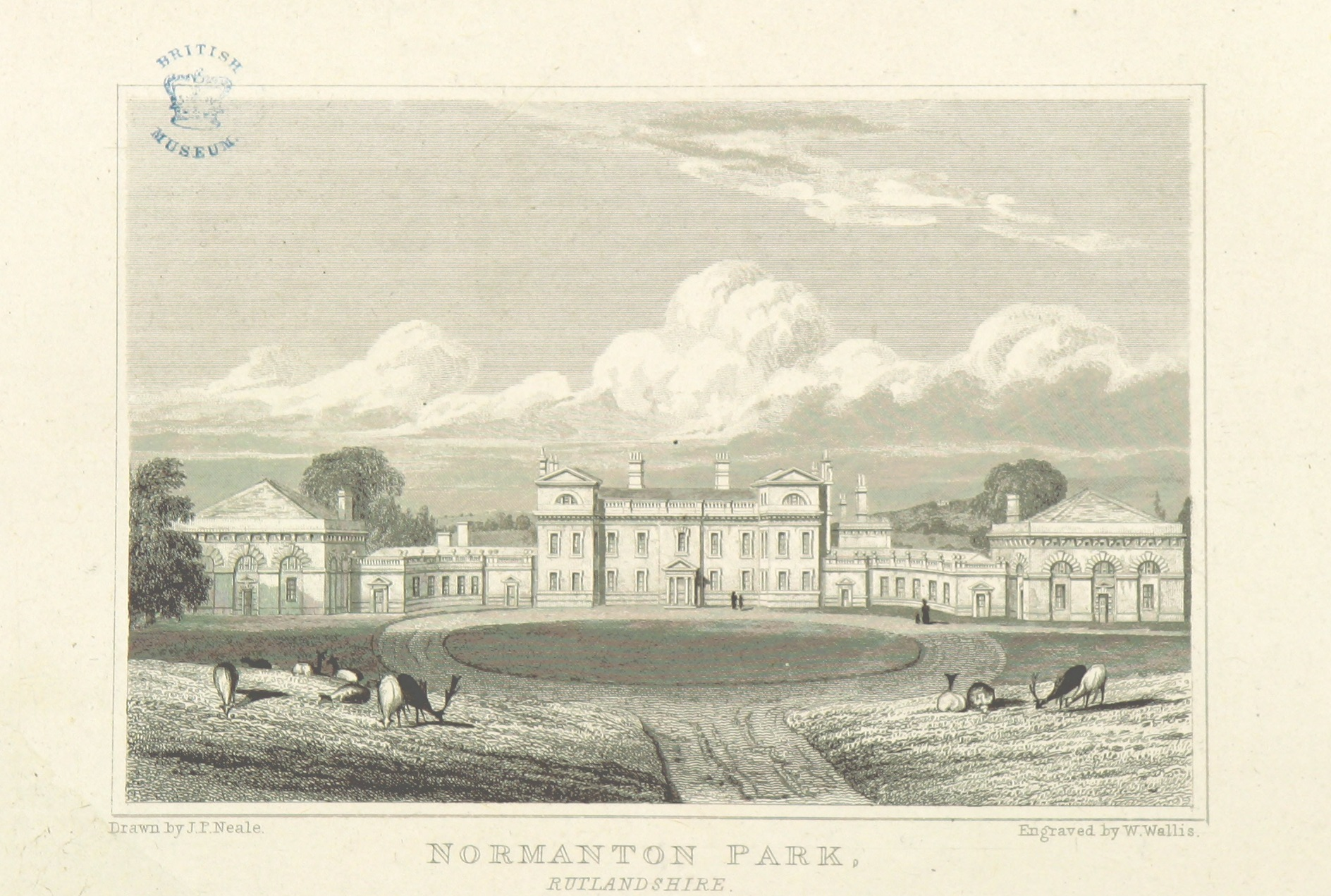
Normanton Park (1818) by John Preston Neale

Normanton Hall was a large, now demolished, country house at Normanton in Rutland.

== History ==
Normanton was the possession of the De Normanvilles for fourteen generations following the Norman Conquest. The estate then passed in 1446 to Alice Basings who was married to Thomas Mackworth, of Mackworth, Derbyshire. The house was then in the possession of the Mackworths for several generations. Thomas Mackworth, High Sheriff of Rutland for 1599 and 1609, was created a baronet on 4 June 1619. Sir Thomas Mackworth, 4th Baronet, was ruined by electioneering costs in the early 1720s and was forced to sell.

The estate was bought by Sir Gilbert Heathcote, 1st Baronet, Lord Mayor of London, in 1729. His son, Sir John Heathcote, 2nd Baronet, rebuilt the hall between 1735 and 1740 to the design of Henry Joynes and Sir Gilbert Heathcote, 3rd Baronet, enlarged the hall to the design of Kenton Couse between 1763 and 1766. A large central bow window designed by Thomas Cundy was added around 1800. In the 18th century the village was cleared to make a park for the estate of the Heathcote family with the population mainly re-housed in Empingham, and the old church on the estate was rebuilt in 1764 by the 3rd Baronet.

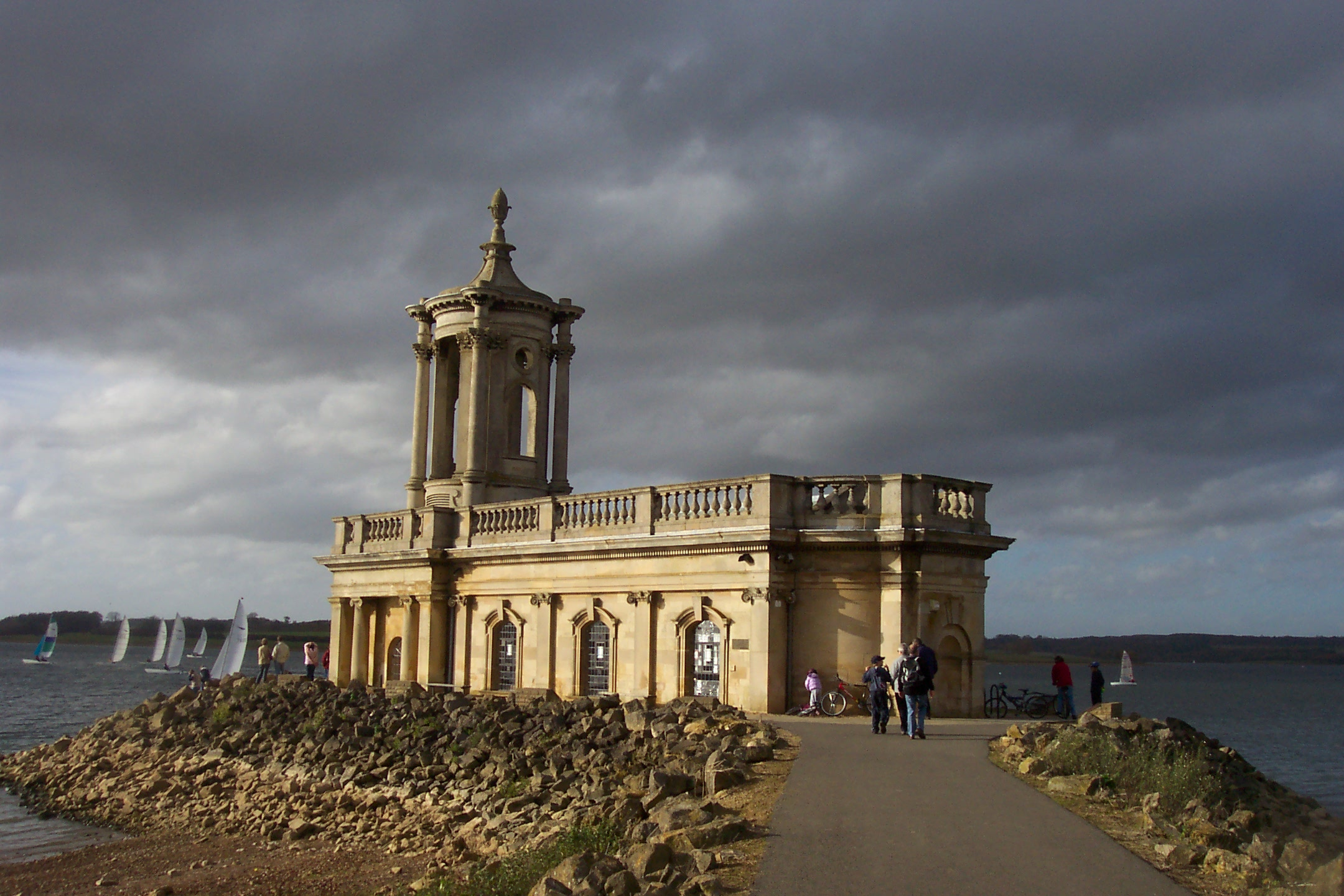
The deconsecrated St Matthew's Church, Normanton, now on the shore of Rutland Water

In 1827 Sir Gilbert Heathcote, 5th Baronet (later Lord Aveland), married Clementina Willoughby (later Baroness Willoughby d'Eresby), who was heiress to the Ancaster estates. Following the death of Evelyn, Countess of Ancaster, the estate was sold off in 1924 but as the mansion could not be sold intact, a further auction in 1925 sold the fixtures and fittings and the shell was demolished.

The stable block of the hall is now the Normanton Park Hotel. St Matthew's Church, Normanton, due to be demolished with the construction of Rutland Water, has been rescued and is reachable by a causeway.

== Sources ==
- Ovens, Robert; Sleath, Sheila (2007). Heritage of Rutland Water. Rutland Local History and Record Society. ISBN 978-0907464396.
- Robinson, John (2011). Felling the Ancient Oaks. Aurum Press. ISBN 978-1845136703.
