= Howe, North Yorkshire =

Village and civil parish in North Yorkshire, England

Coordinates: 54.217500°N 1.454100°W

Howe
- Location within North Yorkshire
- Population: 20
- OS grid reference: SE356803
- Civil parish: Howe
- Unitary authority: North Yorkshire
- Ceremonial county: North Yorkshire
- Region: Yorkshire and the Humber
- Country: England
- Sovereign state: United Kingdom
- Post town: THIRSK
- Postcode district: YO7
- Police: North Yorkshire
- Fire: North Yorkshire
- Ambulance: Yorkshire

Howe is a small village and civil parish in the county of North Yorkshire, England. It is situated near Ainderby Quernhow and the A61 and 5 miles (8 km) west of Thirsk. The population of the civil parish was estimated at 20 in 2015.

From 1974 to 2023 it was part of the Hambleton District, it is now administered by the unitary North Yorkshire Council.

Howe, from the Old Norse word haugr, is a Middle English topographic name for a small hill or a man-made mound or barrow. Howe was historically a township in the ancient parish of Pickhill with Roxby in the North Riding of Yorkshire. At the time of the Domesday Book in 1086 it belonged to Count Alan of Brittany. In the Middle Ages the manor belonged to St Leonard's Hospital, York. Howe became a separate civil parish in 1866.

== See also ==
- Listed buildings in Howe, North Yorkshire
