= Listed buildings in Pickhill =

Pickhill with Roxby is a civil parish in the county of North Yorkshire, England. It contains seven listed buildings that are recorded in the National Heritage List for England. Of these, one is listed at Grade II*, the middle of the three grades, and the others are at Grade II, the lowest grade. The parish contains the village of Pickhill and the surrounding area, which includes the deserted medieval village of Roxby. The listed buildings consist of a church, a cross and a tombstone in the churchyard, three houses and a dovecote.

== Key ==
Grade	Criteria
II*	Particularly important buildings of more than special interest
II	Buildings of national importance and special interest

== Buildings ==
Name and location	Photograph	Date	Notes	Grade
All Saints' Church; 54.24826°N 1.46872°W		12th century	The church has been altered and extended through the centuries, including a restoration in 1877 by G. E. Street. It is built in stone with a slate roof, and consists of a nave, a north aisle, a south porch, a chancel with a north chapel and vestry, and a west tower. The tower has three stages, with buttresses, one forming a stair tower, a clock face, two-light bell openings, a band, and an embattled parapet with corner pinnacles. The south door is Norman, and has three orders of shafts with scalloped capitals, and chevrons in the arch.	II*
Medieval cross 54.24808°N 1.46867°W		Medieval	The cross is in the churchyard of All Saints' Church, to the south of the church. It is in stone, and consists of a short chamfered shaft, with a small sundial set in the top. This stands on a square plinth, with two steps on each side.	II
Church House; 54.24848°N 1.46956°W	—	Mid to late 18th century	The house is in red brick, and has a tile roof with stone coping and shaped kneelers. There are two storeys and three bays. In the centre is a Doric porch and a doorway with a Gibbs surround, flanked by canted bay windows with cornices and hipped lead roofs. The upper floor contains sash windows in architraves with keystones. At the rear is an arched stair window with Gothic glazing.	II
Norton House; 54.24406°N 1.47102°W	—	Mid to late 18th century	The house is in red brick, with dentilled eaves, and a pantile roof with shaped kneelers and stone coping. There are two storeys and three bays, and a later outshut on the right. The central doorway has a Gibbs surround, and the windows are sashes in architraves.	II
Dovecote; 54.24321°N 1.47299°W	—	Mid to late 18th century	The dovecote and cart house are in stone and red brick, with quoins and a stone slate roof with a shaped kneeler and stone coping on the right. There are two storeys and one bay. On the ground floor are two cart openings and a doorway, with brick columns under segmental brick relieving arches, and on the upper floor is a doorway. The right return contains pigeon openings with ledges in the gable, and inside there are brick nesting boxes.	II
Tombstone to Elizabeth Squire; 54.24808°N 1.46879°W	—	1770	The tombstone is in the churchyard of All Saints' Church, to the south of the church, and it commemorates members of the Squire family. It is in stone, at the top is a cherub's head, with a scrolled broken pediment above, and an inscription below.	II
The Old Vicarage; 54.24345°N 1.47371°W		Late 18th century	The vicarage, which was extended in the late 19th century, is in red brick, and has a Welsh slate roof with shaped kneelers and stone coping. There are two storeys, the original part has three bays and the extension to the left is lower with two bays. The extension contains a Doric porch, and sash windows. The left bay of the original part has a canted bay window with a frieze and a cornice, and the other windows are sashes in architraves with keystones.	II
