= Listed buildings in Ainderby Quernhow =

Ainderby Quernhow is a civil parish in North Yorkshire, England. It contains three listed buildings recorded in the National Heritage List for England. All the listed buildings are designated at Grade II, the lowest of the three grades, which is applied to "buildings of national importance and special interest." The parish contains the village of Ainderby Quernhow and the surrounding area. All the listed buildings are in the village, and they are all houses.

== Buildings ==
Name and location	Photograph	Date	Notes
The Old Hall; 54.22339°N 1.46774°W	—	Early 18th century	The house is in red brick, and has a tile roof with stone coped gables and shaped kneelers. There are three storeys and five bays, the middle bay projecting under a pediment and an eaves band. The central doorway has a plinth, a moulded architrave, imposts, a fanlight, and a double keystone. The windows are sashes in architraves, and have flat arches with stepped tripartite keystones.
Ainderby Hall; 54.22294°N 1.46625°W	—	Mid 18th century	A house in red brick with quoins, floor bands, a dentilled eaves band, and a tile roof with stone coped gables and shaped kneelers. There are three storeys, fronts of five and two bays, and a lower two-storey rear wing. Three steps lead up to a central doorway that has rusticated Doric half-columns, a frieze, a cornice and a pediment. The windows are sashes with architraves and flat brick arches.
Ainderby Villa; 54.22298°N 1.46745°W	—	Early 19th century	The house is in red brick on a stuccoed plinth, and has a hipped Welsh slate roof. There are two storeys and three bays. In the centre is a Doric porch with two columns, two pilasters, a frieze decorated with swags and paterae, a cornice and a blocking course, a doorway with a Gothic traceried fanlight and a moulded archivolt. The windows are sashes with stuccoed flat arches.
