= Normanton, Rutland =

Village in Rutland, England

Coordinates: 52.644°N 0.622°W

Normanton
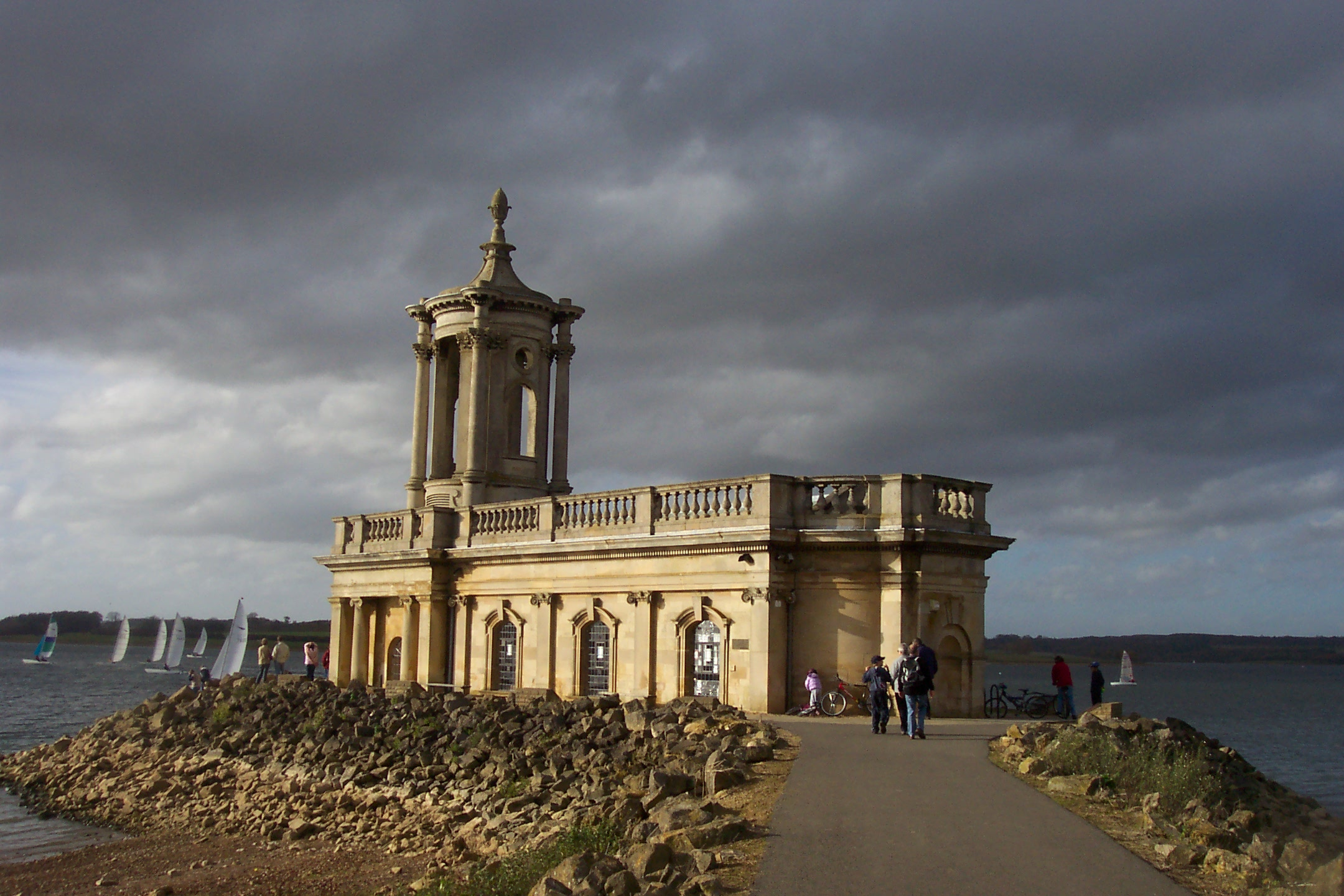
- St Matthew's Church, Normanton

- Location within Rutland
- Area: 1.125 sq mi (2.91 km^{2})
- Population: 26 2001 Census
  - Density: 23/sq mi (8.9/km^{2})
- OS grid reference: SK933060
  - London: 82 miles (132 km) SSE
- Unitary authority: Rutland
- Shire county: Rutland
- Ceremonial county: Rutland
- Region: East Midlands
- Country: England
- Sovereign state: United Kingdom
- Post town: OAKHAM
- Postcode district: LE15
- Dialling code: 01572
- Police: Leicestershire
- Fire: Leicestershire
- Ambulance: East Midlands
- UK Parliament: Rutland and Stamford

Normanton is a village and civil parish on the eastern shore of Rutland Water in the county of Rutland in the East Midlands of England. The population remained less than 100 at the 2011 census and was included in the civil parish of Edith Weston.

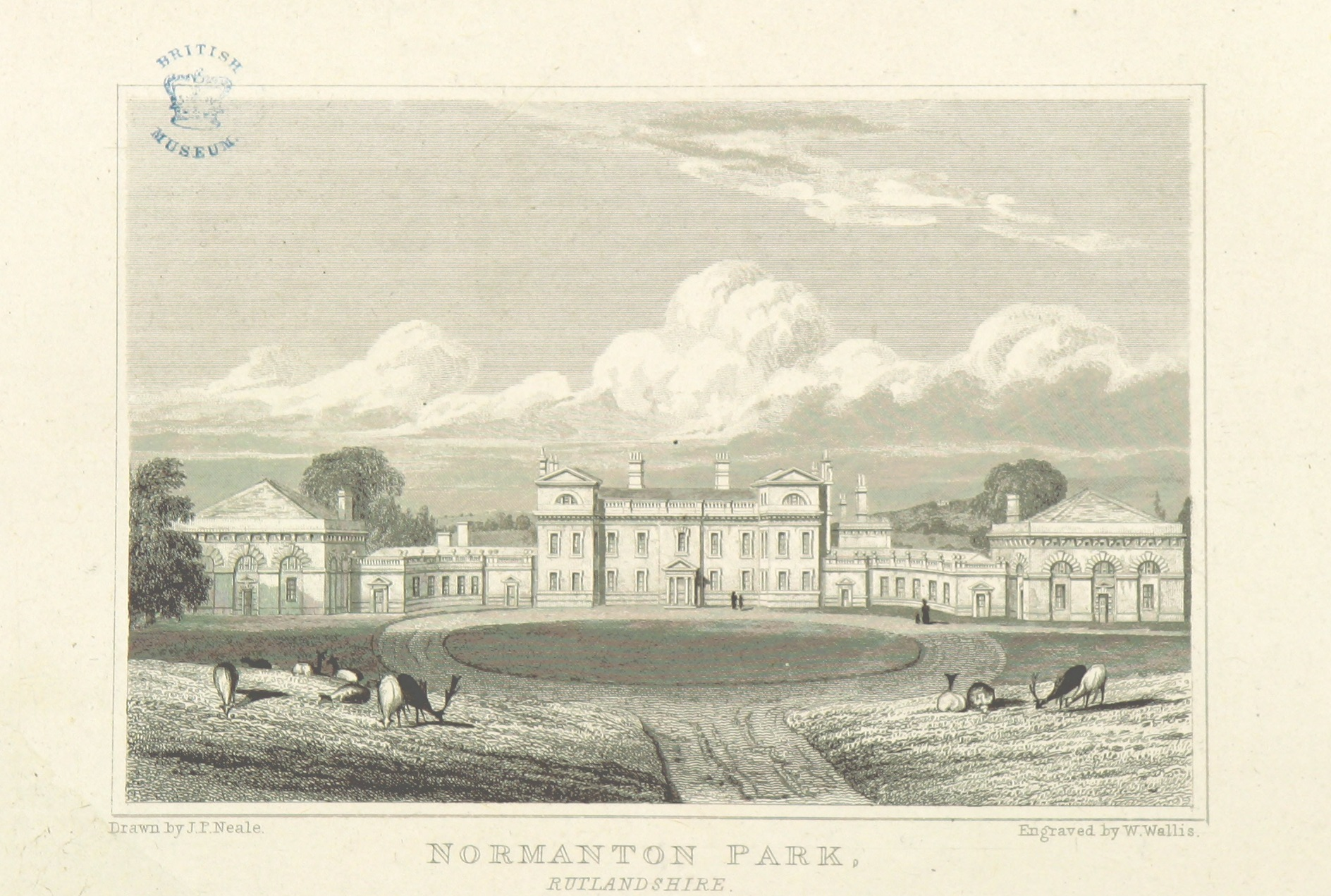
Print of Normanton Park by J. P. Neale (1818)

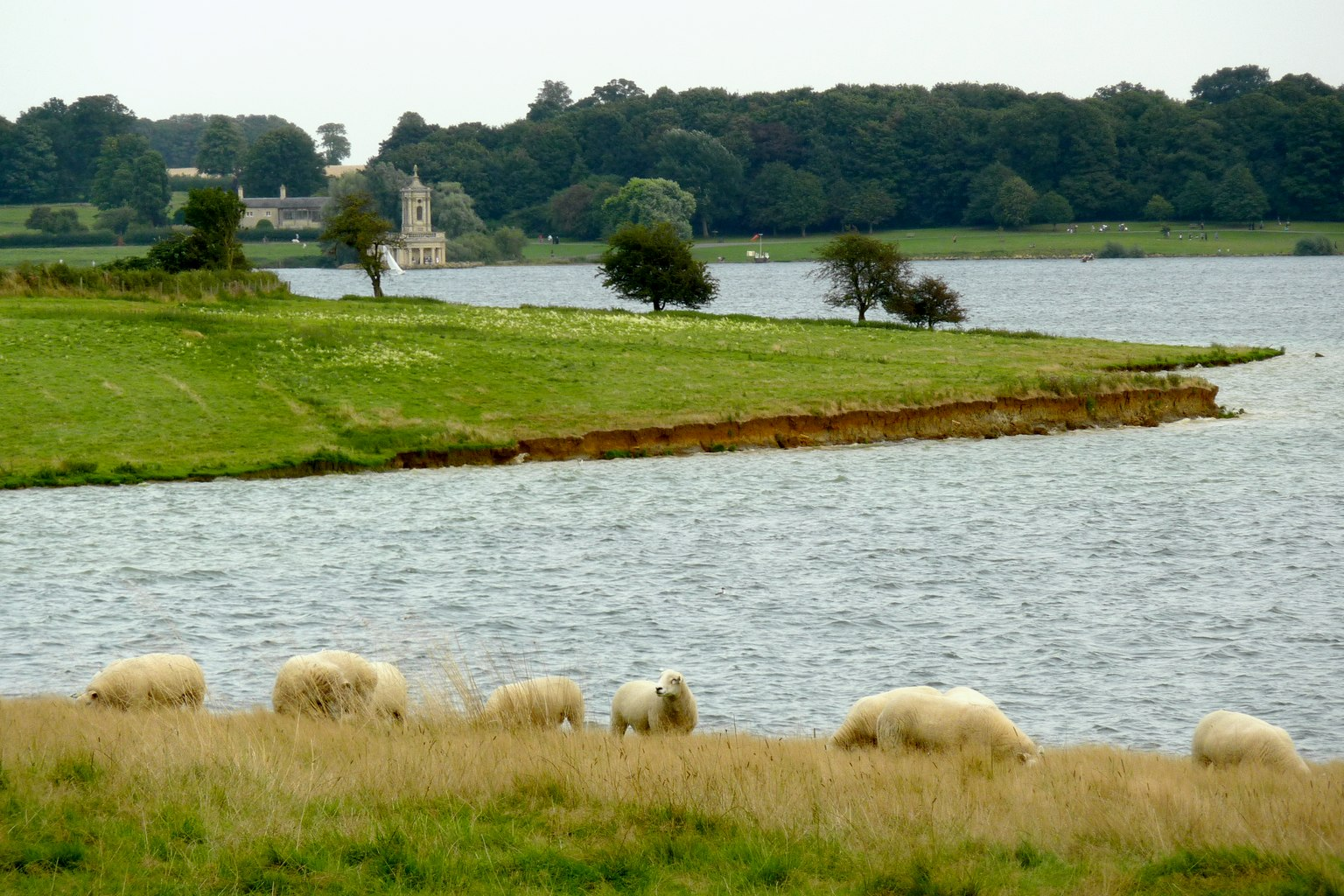
Normanton and St Matthew's Church viewed from Hambleton Peninsula

Normanton Hall was a seat of the Earls of Ancaster and an important centre of their estates. The stable block of their hall is now Normanton Park hotel. In the 18th century the village was cleared to make a park for the estate of the Heathcote family with the population mainly re-housed in Empingham.

The village's name means 'farm/settlement of the Norwegian Vikings'.

In the 1970s much of the parish was flooded by the construction of the Rutland Water reservoir.

St Matthew's Church is a Grade II listed building, built in classical style. The tower and the western portico were built by Thomas Cundy Jr between 1826 and 1829, based on the design of St John's, Smith Square in Westminster, while the nave and apse were constructed in 1911, by J. B. Gridley of London. The building was once the private chapel for the Normanton Estate, but it was de-consecrated in 1970, and was to have been demolished as part of the reservoir construction, as its floor was below the proposed water level. Following a public outcry, the lower half was filled with stone and rubble, and a concrete cap constructed just below the level of the windows. An embankment was built around the church leaving it a prominent feature on the water's edge. The structure formerly housed a museum recording the history of Rutland Water, which is now located in the visitor centre. The structure is now used as a venue for civil weddings and concerts.

Normanton is the name of a ward of Rutland County Council, returning two councillors. The ward includes Edith Weston, Empingham, North Luffenham and South Luffenham.
