= Listed buildings in Howe, North Yorkshire =

Howe is a civil parish in the county of North Yorkshire, England. It contains four listed buildings that are recorded in the National Heritage List for England. All the listed buildings are designated at Grade II, the lowest of the three grades, which is applied to "buildings of national importance and special interest". The parish contains the village of Howe and the surrounding area, and the listed buildings consist of a house, two farmhouses and a pump.

== Buildings ==
Name and location	Photograph	Date	Notes
Howe Hall; 54.21665°N 1.45189°W	—	Late 18th century	A farmhouse that was extended to the right in the mid 19th century, it is in rendered red brick with a stone slate roof. The original block has two storeys and three bays, and a roof with a shaped kneeler and stone coping on he left. Steps lead up to a central doorway with pilasters, a fanlight, consoles, a frieze and a cornice. The extension has a hipped roof, quoins, and a deep cornice with consoles. The windows in both parts are sashes with flat arches.
The Farm; 54.21723°N 1.45259°W	—	Late 18th century	The farmhouse is rendered, and has a pantile roof with shaped kneelers and stone coping. The central doorway has an architrave and a fanlight, the windows are sashes, and all are under stuccoed flat arches.
The Rookery; 54.21791°N 1.45374°W	—	Early to mid 19th century	The house is in stone on a plinth. It consists of a main block with two storeys and three bays, and a recessed wing to the right with two storeys and two bays. The main block has a tile roof with stone coping and shaped kneelers. Steps lead up to a central doorway with a stone lintel. The wing has a Welsh slate roof with stone coping, quoins, and a doorway with a flat arch. The windows in both parts are sashes.
Pump to rear of Howe Hall; 54.21677°N 1.45170°W	—	1840	The pump is in a wooden case, and has a straight wrought iron handle and an initialled and dated lead spout. In front is a trough in York stone, with a rectangular plan, rounded corners and small hole in the base.
