= Listed buildings in Holme, North Yorkshire =

Holme is a civil parish in the county of North Yorkshire, England. It contains two listed buildings that are recorded in the National Heritage List for England. Both the listed buildings are designated at Grade II, the lowest of the three grades, which is applied to "buildings of national importance and special interest". The parish contains the village of Holme and the surrounding area. Both the listed buildings are in the village, and both are houses.

== Buildings ==
Name and location	Photograph	Date	Notes
The Manor House; 54.23504°N 1.45323°W	—	Early to mid 18th century	The house is in red brick, with dentilled eaves, and a pantile roof with shaped kneelers and stone coping. There are two storeys, a cruciform plan, and a main range of three bays. The middle bay projects under a hipped roof, and in the left return is a doorway with a quoined surround and a triple keystone. The windows are sashes in architraves, with flat brick arches and keystones.
Holme Lodge; 54.23565°N 1.46262°W	—	Mid to late 18th century	The house is rendered, and has a tile roof and a pedimented gable with coping. There are two storeys and three bays. In the ground floor are two canted bay windows with sashes, a continuous sill band, a frieze, and small domical lead roofs, and the upper floor contains sash windows.
