= St Matthew's Church, Normanton =

De-consecrated church in Normanton, Rutland

Coordinates: 52°38′47″N 0°37′23″W

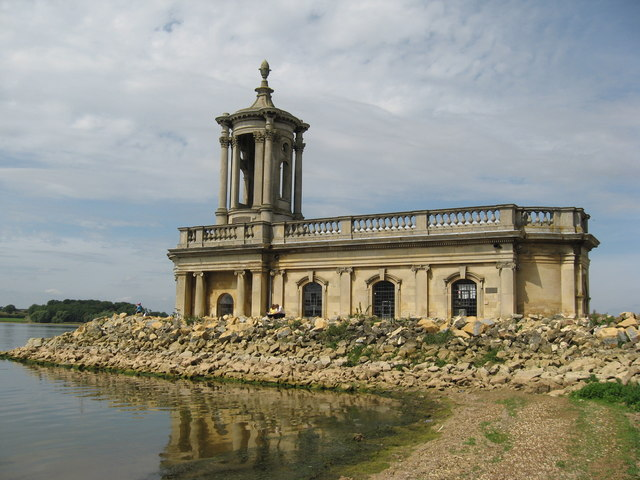

History
- Dedication: St Matthew

Administration
- Parish: Normanton, Rutland

St Matthew's Church is a de-consecrated church in Normanton, Rutland. It is now on the shore of Rutland Water. The building is Grade II listed.

== History ==
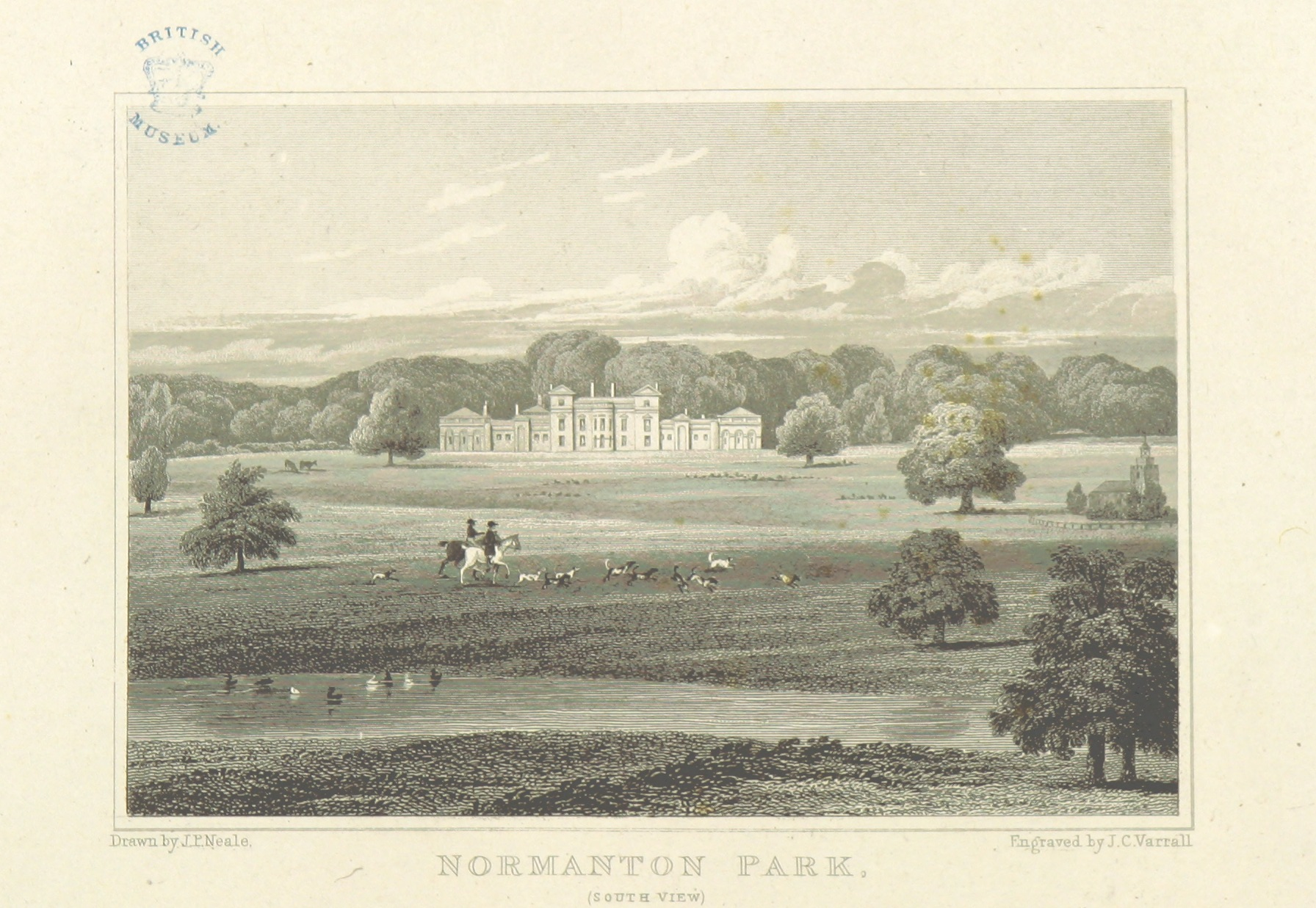
This 1818 print shows Normanton Hall and, to the right, the church before its rebuilding

The church was built in classical style for the Normanton Hall estate on the site of a 14th-century building. Except for the tower, the medieval church was rebuilt in 1764 by Sir Gilbert Heathcote, 3rd Baronet. A new classical tower and the western portico were built by Thomas Cundy junior between 1826 and 1829, based on the design of St John's, Smith Square, Westminster; the nave and apse were constructed in 1911, by J. B. Gridley of London.

The church was de-consecrated in 1970, and was to have been demolished as part of the reservoir construction, as its floor was below the proposed water level. Following a public outcry, the lower half was filled with stone and rubble, and a concrete cap constructed just below the level of the windows. An embankment was built around the church leaving it a prominent feature on the water's edge. The structure is owned by Anglian Water and is now used as a venue for civil weddings and concerts. It formerly housed a museum recording the history of Rutland Water.

Seven monuments of family members of the Earls of Ancaster were moved in 1972 to St Michael's, Edenham, the parish church of the Grimsthorpe Castle estate in Lincolnshire. Other monuments, gravestones and burials were moved to the Church of St Mary the Virgin, Edith Weston.
