= All Saints' Church, Pickhill =

Church in Pickhill, North Yorkshire, England

Coordinates: 54°14′54″N 1°28′07″W

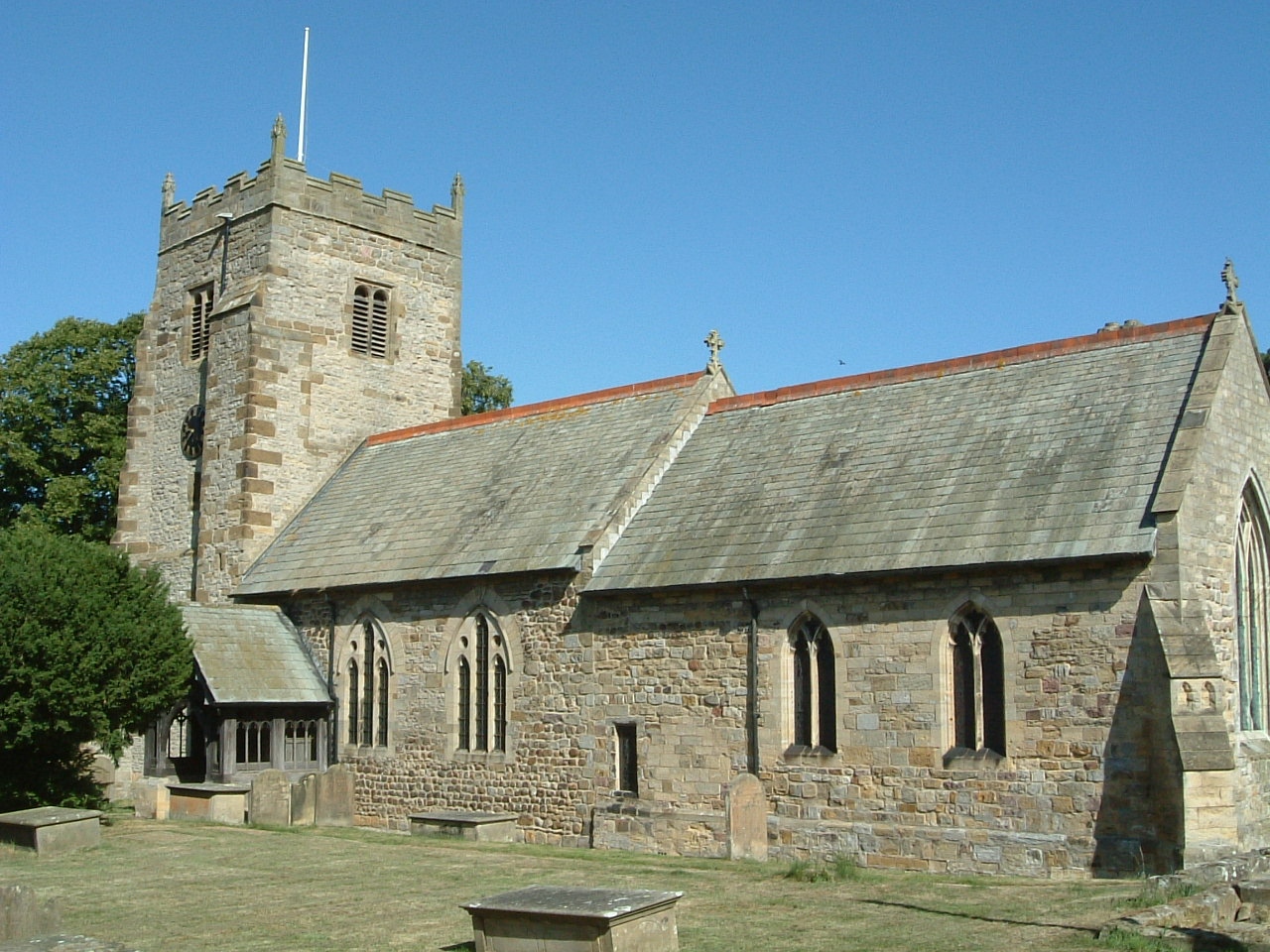
The church, in 2006

All Saints' Church is the parish church of Pickhill, a village in North Yorkshire, in England.

The church was built in about 1150, from which period part of the nave walls survive, along with the chancel arch and south doorway. In about 1200, the north aisle and chapel were added. The chancel was enlarged in the early 14th century, while late in the 15th century, the tower was added. In 1877, the church was restored by George Edmund Street who rebuilt the north aisle, added a vestry, and replaced most of the windows. The church was grade II* listed in 1966.

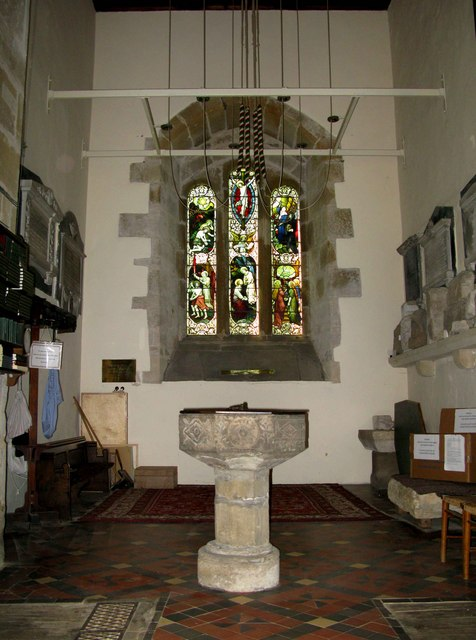
The font

The church is built of stone with a slate roof, and consists of a nave, a north aisle, a south porch, a chancel with a north chapel and vestry, and a west tower. The tower has three stages, with buttresses, one forming a stair tower, a clock face, two-light bell openings, a band, and an embattled parapet with corner pinnacles. The south door is Norman, and has three orders of shafts with scalloped capitals, and chevrons in the arch. Inside, there is an octagonal font dating from 1662. In the tower are several fragments of pre-Norman Conquest carved stones, one depicting a dragon.

== See also ==
- Grade II* listed churches in North Yorkshire (district)
- Listed buildings in Pickhill
