= St Andrew's Church, Hambleton =

Church in Hambleton, Rutland

Coordinates: 52°39′31″N 0°40′17″W

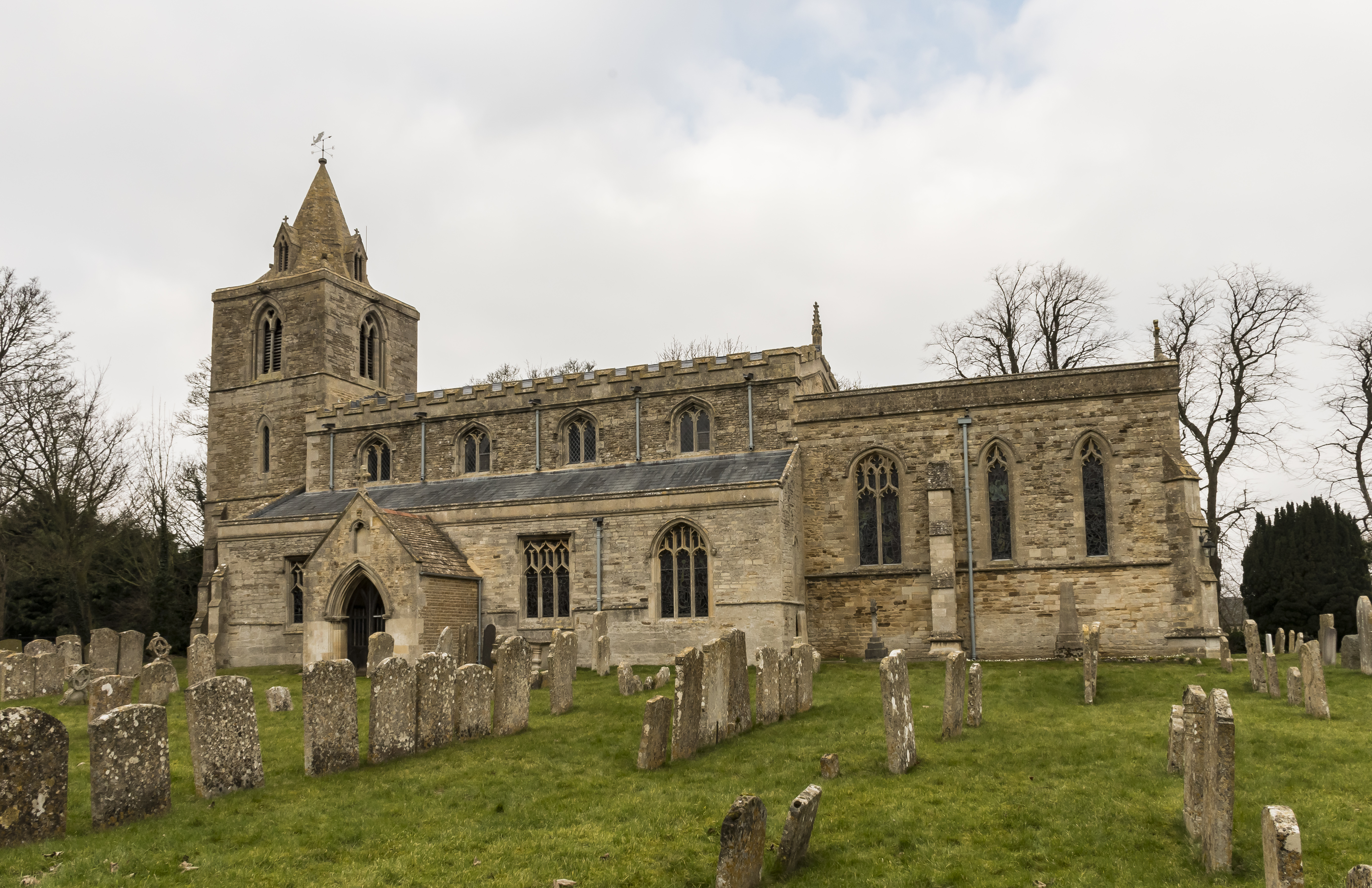
- Denomination: Church of England

History
- Dedication: St Andrew

Administration
- Diocese: Peterborough
- Parish: Hambleton, Rutland

Clergy
- Vicar(s): Stephen Griffiths

St Andrew's Church is the Church of England parish church of Hambleton, Rutland. It is a Grade II* listed building.

== History ==
The church dates from the early Norman era and possibly the late Anglo-Saxon period, therefore it is one of the older churches in Rutland.

The church was mentioned in the Domesday Book, one of only four churches in Rutland specifically recorded in the survey.

Most of the fabric in the church dates from 800 to 1190 though this is obscured by Victorian Restoration in the 1890s. The church has stained glass, most by James Egan. The clerestory was added in the 14th century and the tower in c1200.

The carved southern doorway dates from c1180. There is an oak chest, that was used for storing the church's valuable items, bound with iron straps. The lectern has an original 1611 King James Bible chained to it.

The pulpit dates from the Victorian era but some parts date to the 17th century.

The church has some carved grave slabs, probably depicting donors of the church, one is male, the other female. The male is possibly Lord Badlesmere who held a market and summer fair at Hambleton. The church also has a triple sedilia and a carved piscina.

Outside is the tomb of Robert Tomlinson, who was vicar of the church for 40 years.
