= Hambleton Ales =

Brewery in Harrogate, North Yorkshire, England

Hambleton Ales is a brewery that was established in 1991 in the tiny hamlet of Holme on Swale, in Hambleton, North Yorkshire, England. Initially based in a converted outbuilding, the brewery achieved the target production of 800 gallons a week, within the first six months, and an award-winning beer within the first year.

Hambleton Ales have won a number of awards. Nightmare won Champion Beer at the Society of Independent Brewers (SIBA) northern competition in January 2006 and a gold in the Campaign for Real Ale Champion Winter Beer of Britain in January 1997; and Gluten Free Ale won ‘Best Beer Innovation’ in the coveted Tesco Beer Challenge in 2005.

Today, Hambleton Ales produces 100 barrels a week, employs a staff of fifteen and regularly exports to Europe and the USA.

In 2007, Hambleton Ales moved to a larger Brewery on Barker Business Park, Melmerby.
