= Hambleton Peninsula =

Peninsula in Rutland, England

Coordinates: 52.65°N 0.64°W

Map of Rutland Water and the peninsula

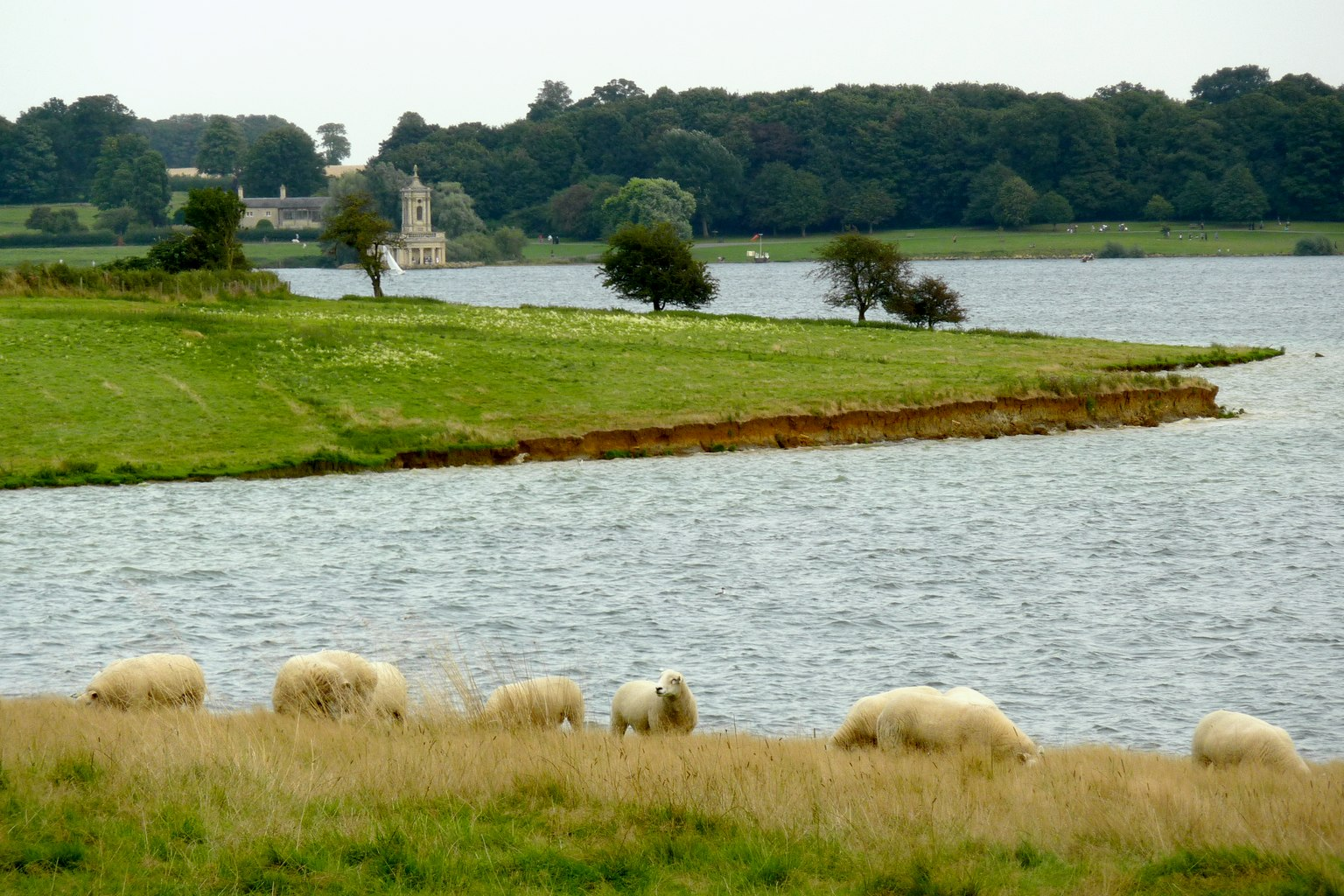
The deconsecrated St Matthew's Church, Normanton, Rutland viewed from Hambleton Peninsula.

The Hambleton Peninsula lies within the reservoir Rutland Water, in Rutland, England. When the Gwash Valley was dammed in 1975, the area surrounding what was then a ridge was submerged, including a small number of properties in the hamlets of Nether Hambleton and Middle Hambleton. The village of Upper Hambleton survived, and now sits on the peninsula, which is some 2¼ miles (3500 metres) in length and 1000 yards (metres) in width.

The area of the peninsula lies in the parish of Hambleton with the exception of a small detached area of Exton parish on the north shore.

The Hambleton Peninsula and its surroundings feature heavily in British author Robert Goddard’s fictional mystery thriller Set in Stone (1999).

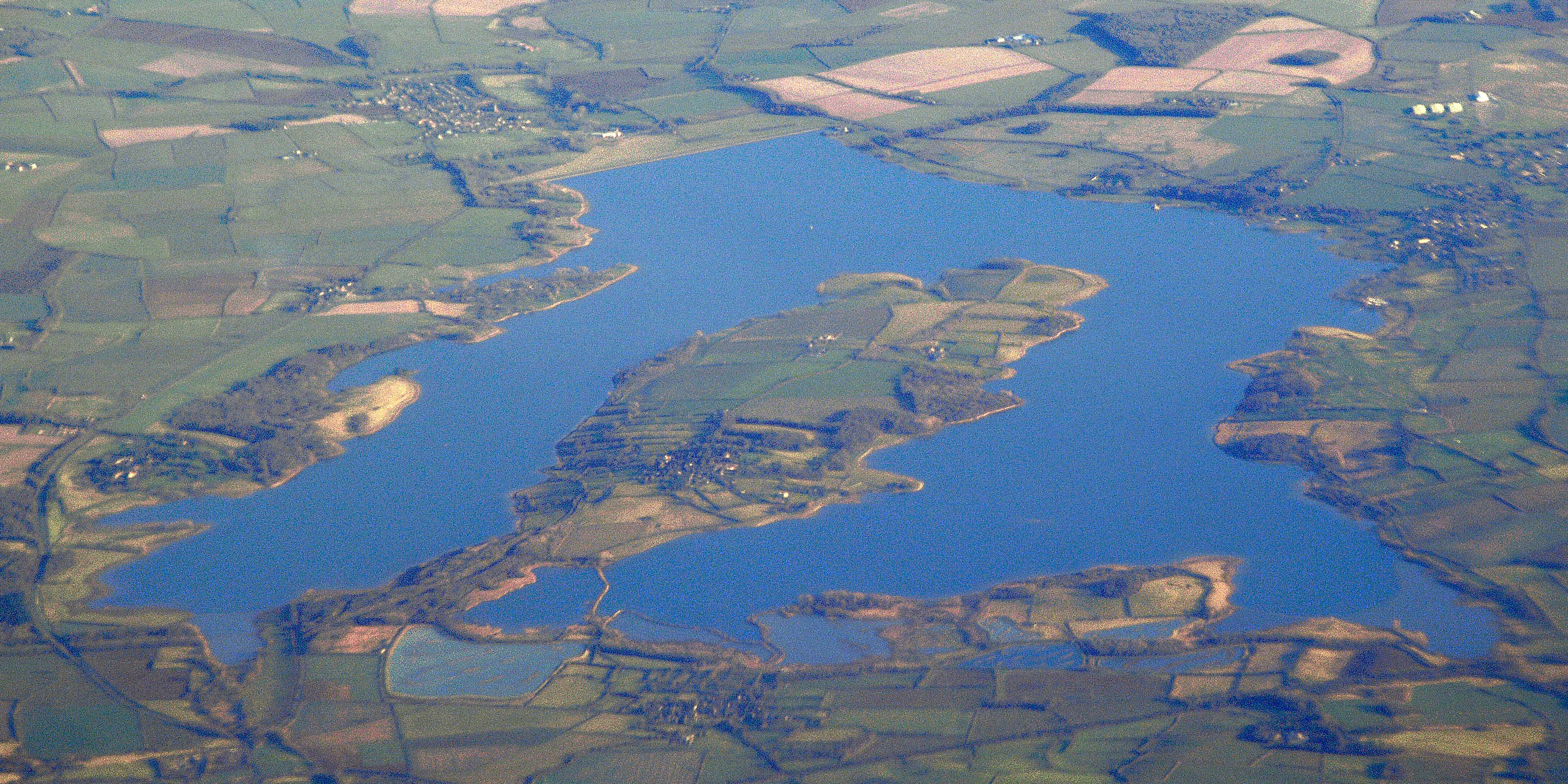
Aerial view of Rutland Water with Hambleton Peninsula in the middle
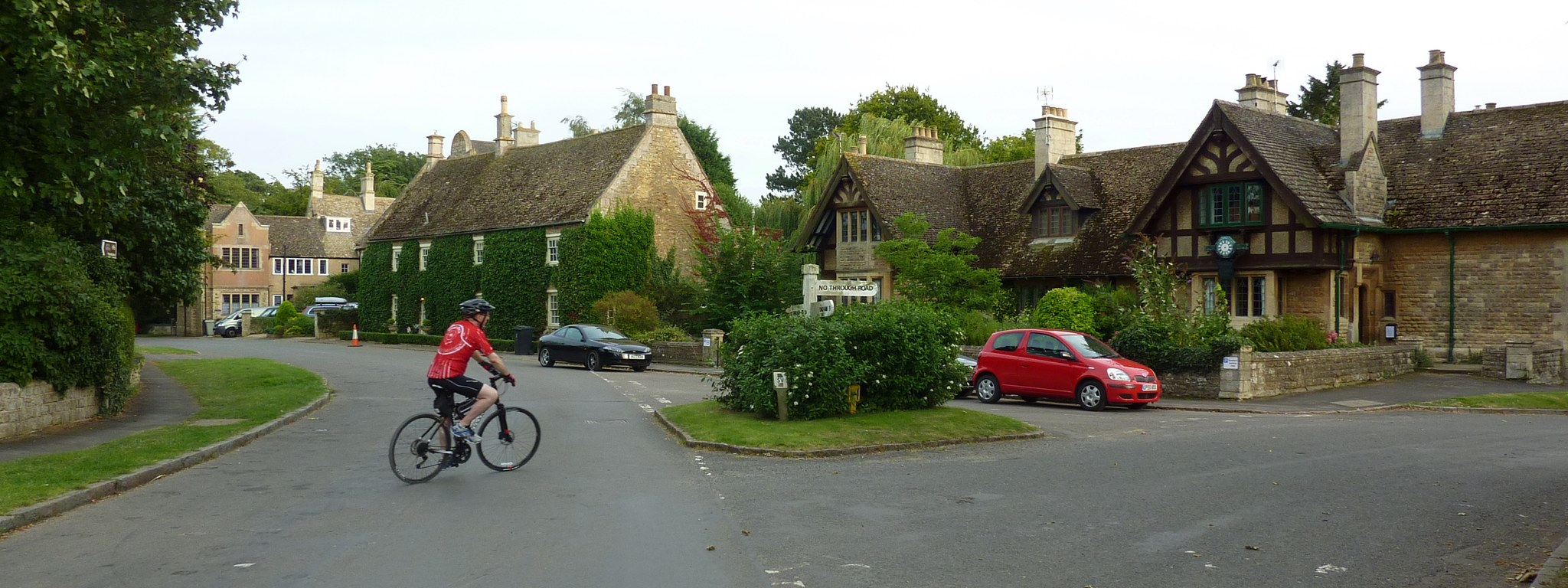
The high street of Upper Hambleton

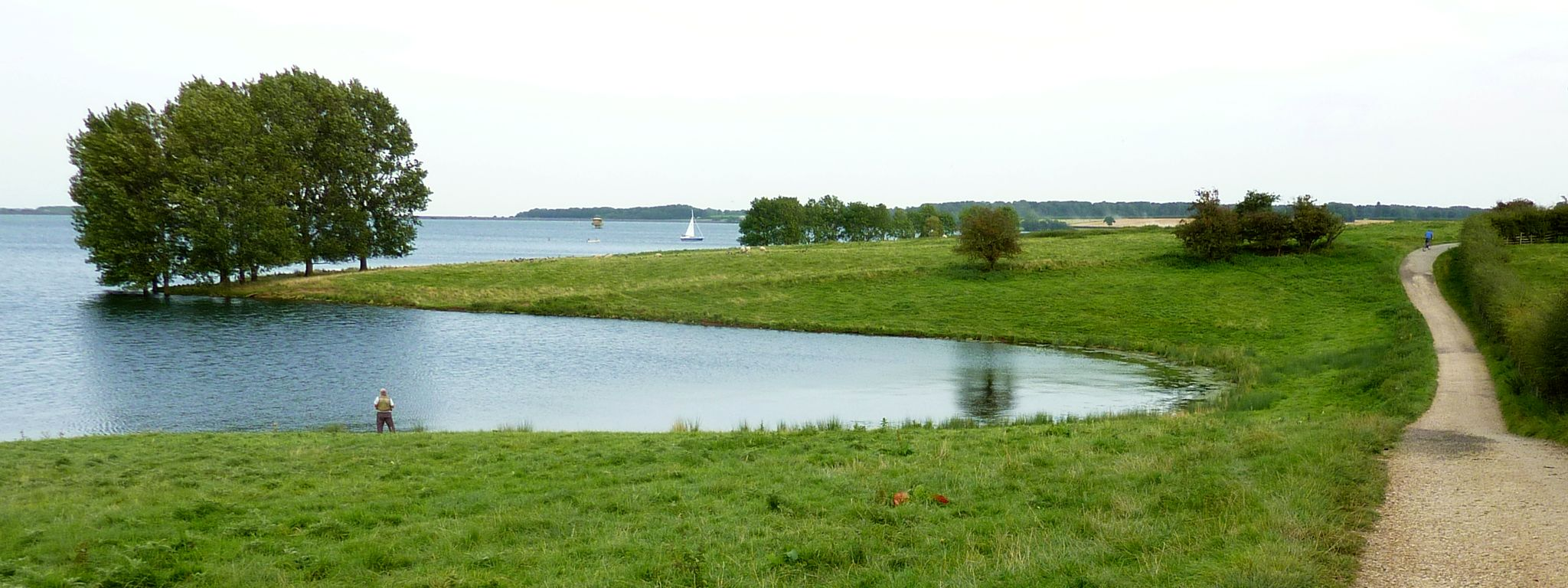
View of the north shore of Rutland Water from Hambleton Peninsula
