= HMS Hambledon =

HMS Hambledon has been the name of more than one ship of the British Royal Navy, and may refer to:

- HMS Hambledon (1917), a Hunt-class minesweeper launched in 1917 and sold in 1922
- HMS Hambledon (L37), an Hunt-class escort destroyer in commission from 1940 to 1945 that served during World War II
