= Hambleton, Rutland =

Village in Rutland, England

Coordinates: 52.659°N 0.671°W

Hambleton
- Village and Civil Parish
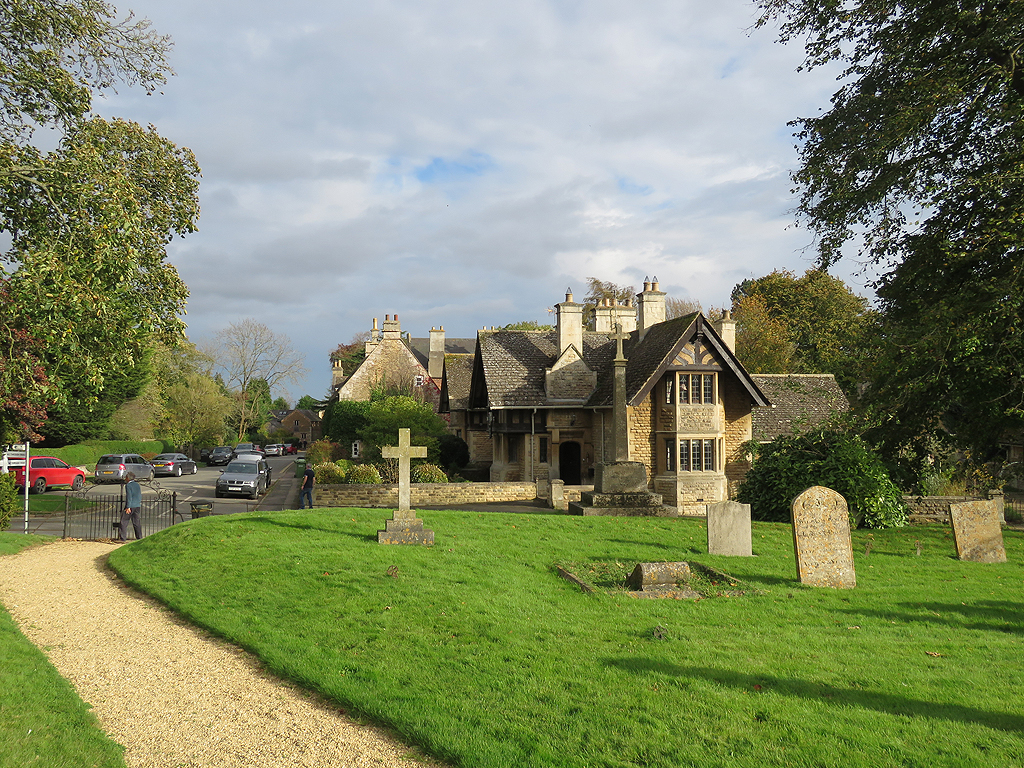
- From the graveyard towards Ketton Road.

- Location within Rutland
- Area: 4.47 sq mi (11.6 km^{2})
- Population: 140 2001 Census
  - Density: 26/sq mi (10/km^{2})
- OS grid reference: SK900075
  - London: 84 miles (135 km) SSE
- Unitary authority: Rutland
- Shire county: Rutland
- Ceremonial county: Rutland
- Region: East Midlands
- Country: England
- Sovereign state: United Kingdom
- Post town: OAKHAM
- Postcode district: LE15
- Dialling code: 01572
- Police: Leicestershire
- Fire: Leicestershire
- Ambulance: East Midlands
- UK Parliament: Rutland and Stamford

Hambleton is a village and civil parish in Rutland, England. It is about two miles (3 km) east of Oakham. The village now stands on the Hambleton Peninsula between arms of the Rutland Water reservoir. Hambleton Hall is a prominent hotel.

== Description ==
The village's name means 'maimed hill'. It has been thought that the hill in the village looks as if it has been sliced off.

In 2001 Hambleton had a population of 140, increasing to 203 at the 2011 census. Since the construction of Rutland Water in the 1970s, the village has been closed off on three sides by water and the area is known as the Hambleton Peninsula.

The parish originally included the settlements of Upper Hambleton, Middle Hambleton and Nether Hambleton. The latter two have now been almost completely submerged by the construction of Rutland Water (originally known as Empingham Reservoir). The Jacobean Old Hall in Middle Hambleton (built in 1611 and once the home of Sir Abel Barker, 1st Baronet) is now situated on the water's edge.

The village contains the 12th-century St Andrew's Church, Hambleton, a pub called The Finch's Arms and a hotel and restaurant, Hambleton Hall.

The church still has an original Norman south doorway, and was extensively restored and fitted out during the late 19th century. This included excellent stained glass windows created mainly by James Egan during the 1890s. Two of these were dedicated by the Reverend David Elliot Young to his mother and infant child who are buried in the churchyard. It is believed that the windows were funded by Walter Gore Marshall after being petitioned by Rev Young. Adjacent to the south side of the church yard stands a 16th-century priest house.

The Hall was built in 1881 as a hunting box by Walter Marshall who left it to his sister, Eva Astley Paston Cooper. She was a socialite who gathered a salon including Noël Coward, Malcolm Sargent and Charles Scott-Moncrieff. Coward wrote Hay Fever (1924) while staying in the village.

There is a view across to Burley House from the north side of the village and from the south one can see across to the sailing club at Edith Weston on the far shore. The track around the peninsula along the lakeside takes walkers and cyclists through bluebell woods.

Hambleton was rated as among the "20 most beautiful villages in the UK and Ireland" by Condé Nast Traveler in 2020.

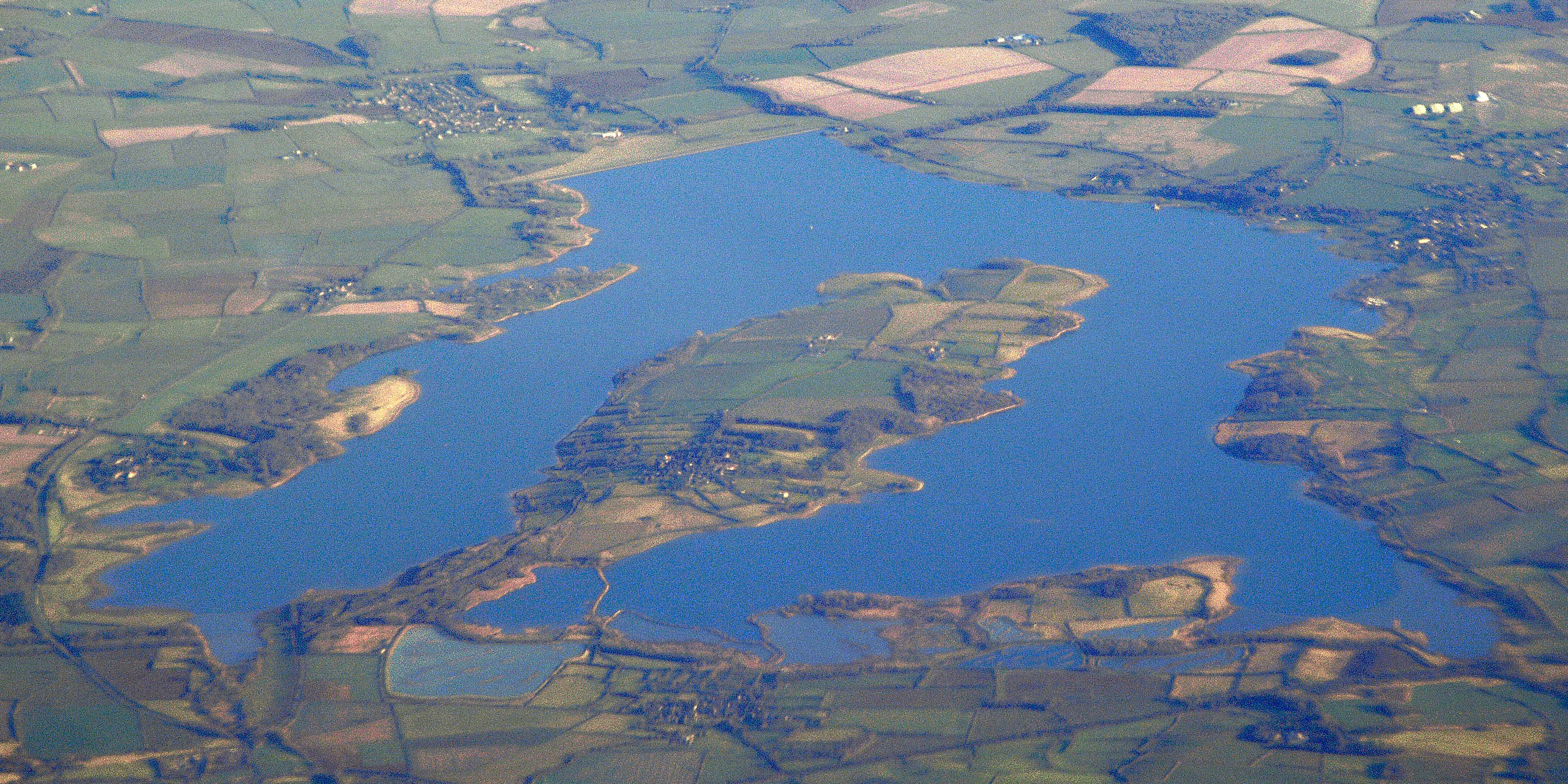
Aerial view of Rutland Water with Hambleton in middle of the peninsula

== Barker baronets of Hambleton ==
Abel Barker, the son of Abel Barker and Elizabeth Wright, in 1637 inherited the manor of Hambleton. He rented part of his lands from Edward Harington and James Harington, and farmed sheep on a large scale. He was elected Member of Parliament for Rutland and he was made a baronet in 1665.

He married twice and was succeeded in his baronetcy by his son from his first marriage, Thomas. The Barker baronets, of Hambleton title became extinct on the death of the second baronet in 1707.

== Gallery ==
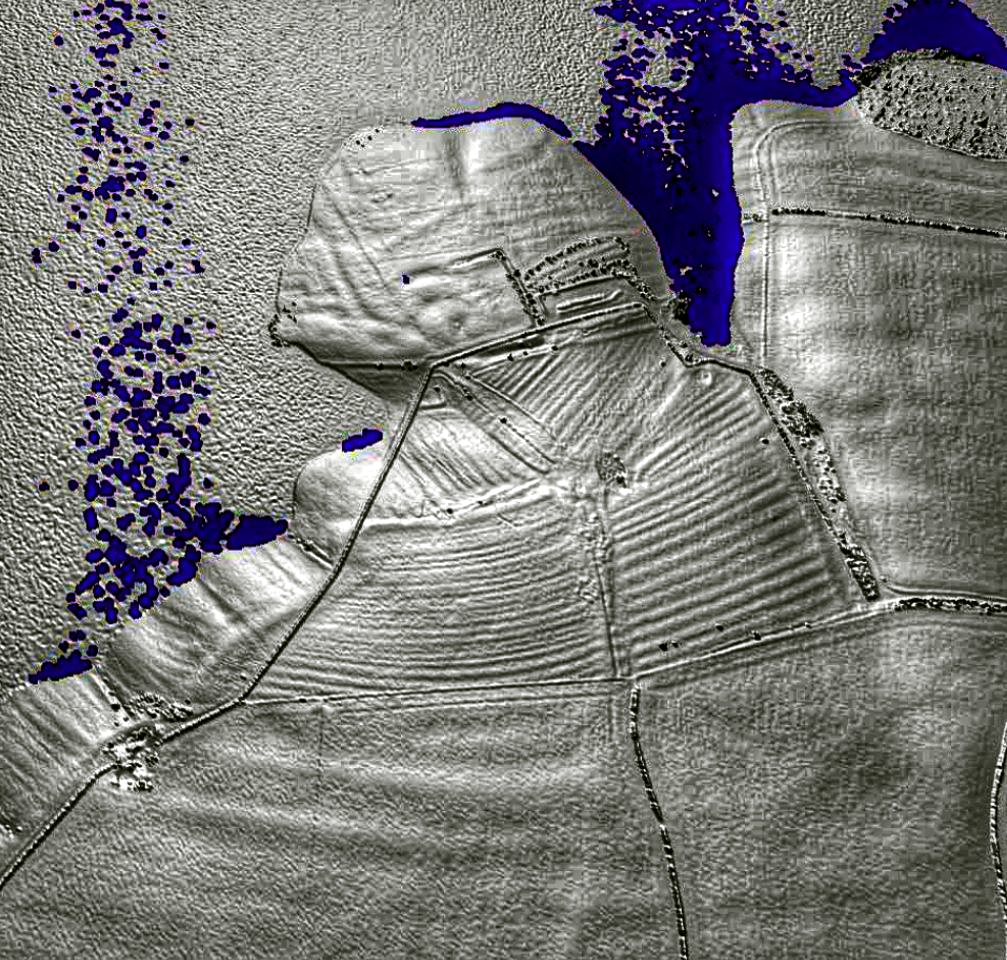
An oblique lidar view of a moated site with ridge and furrow north of Barnhill Spinney at Hambleton

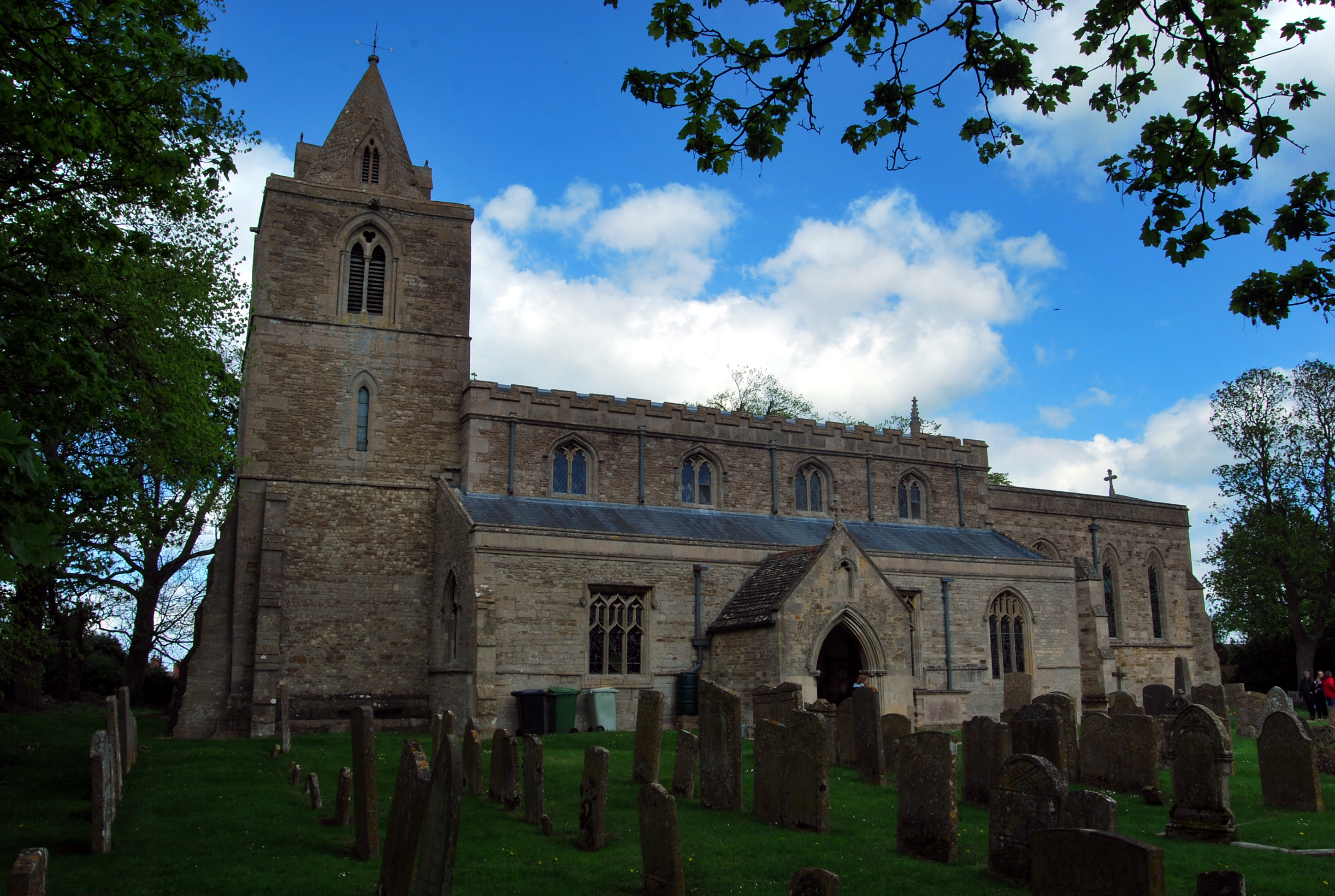
The parish church dedicated to St Andrew

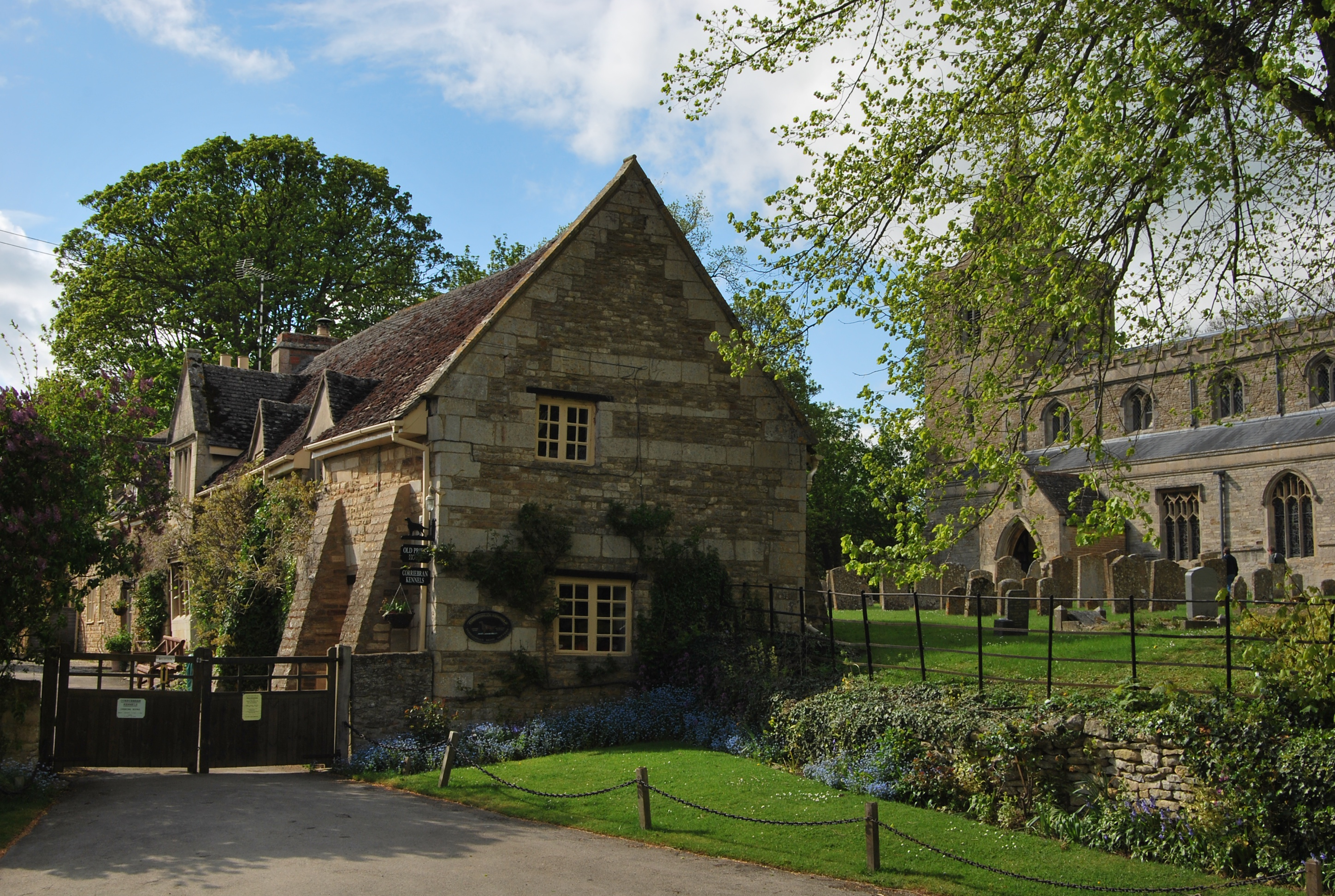
The Priest House

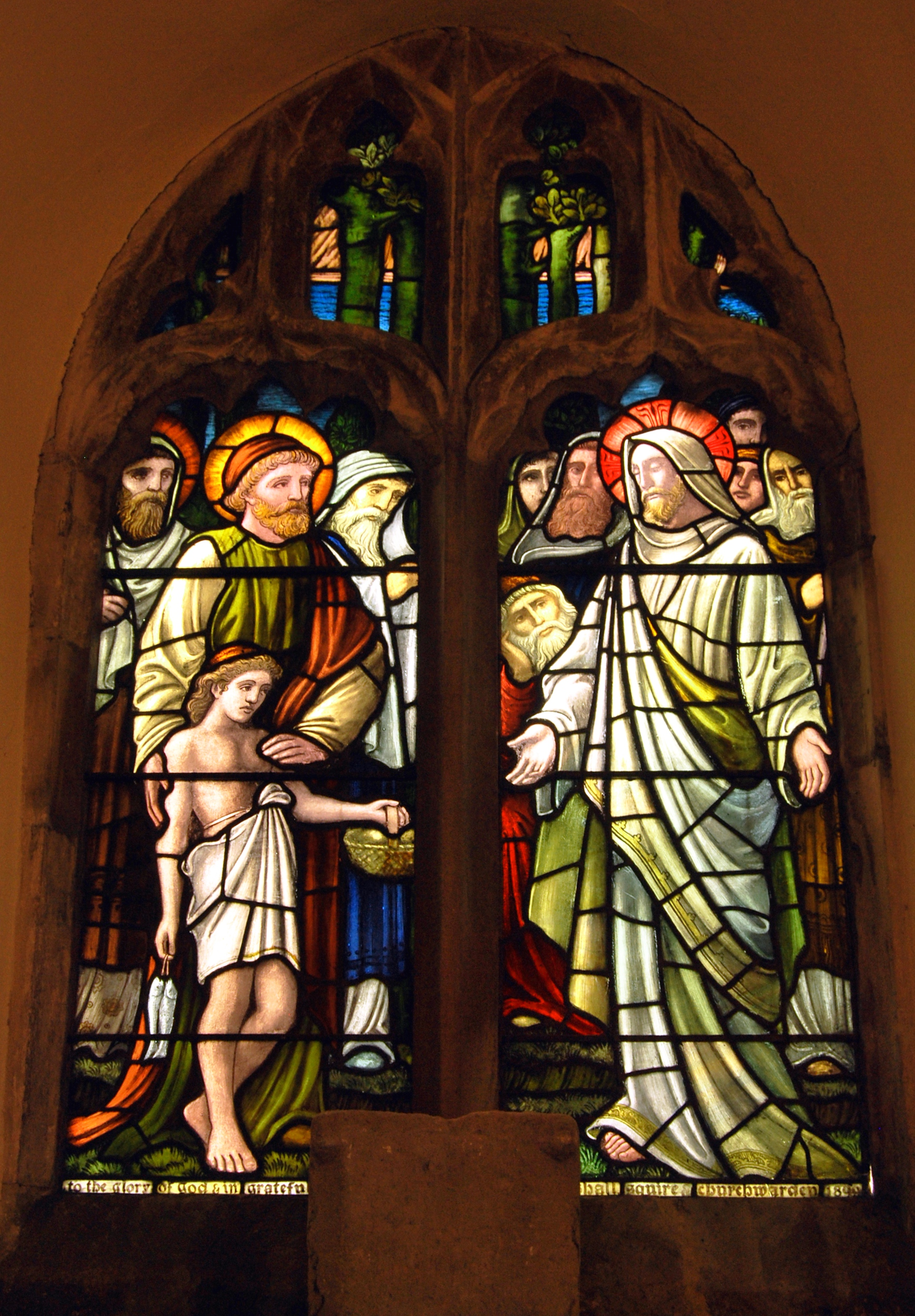
One of St Andrew's windows, by James Egan (1899)

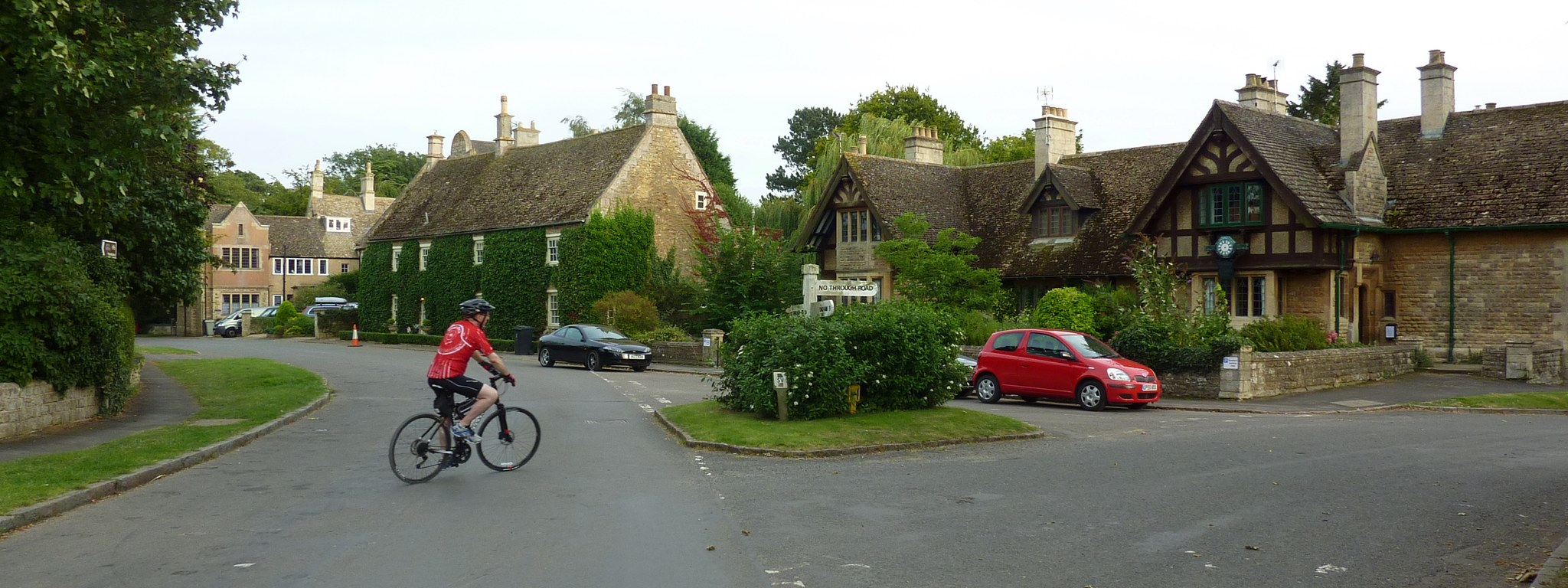
The High Street
