= Rutland Water =

Reservoir in Rutland, England

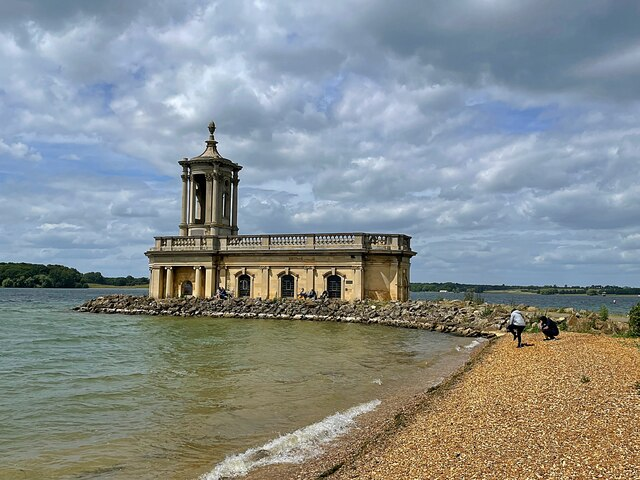
- St Matthew's Church, Normanton, on the water's edge

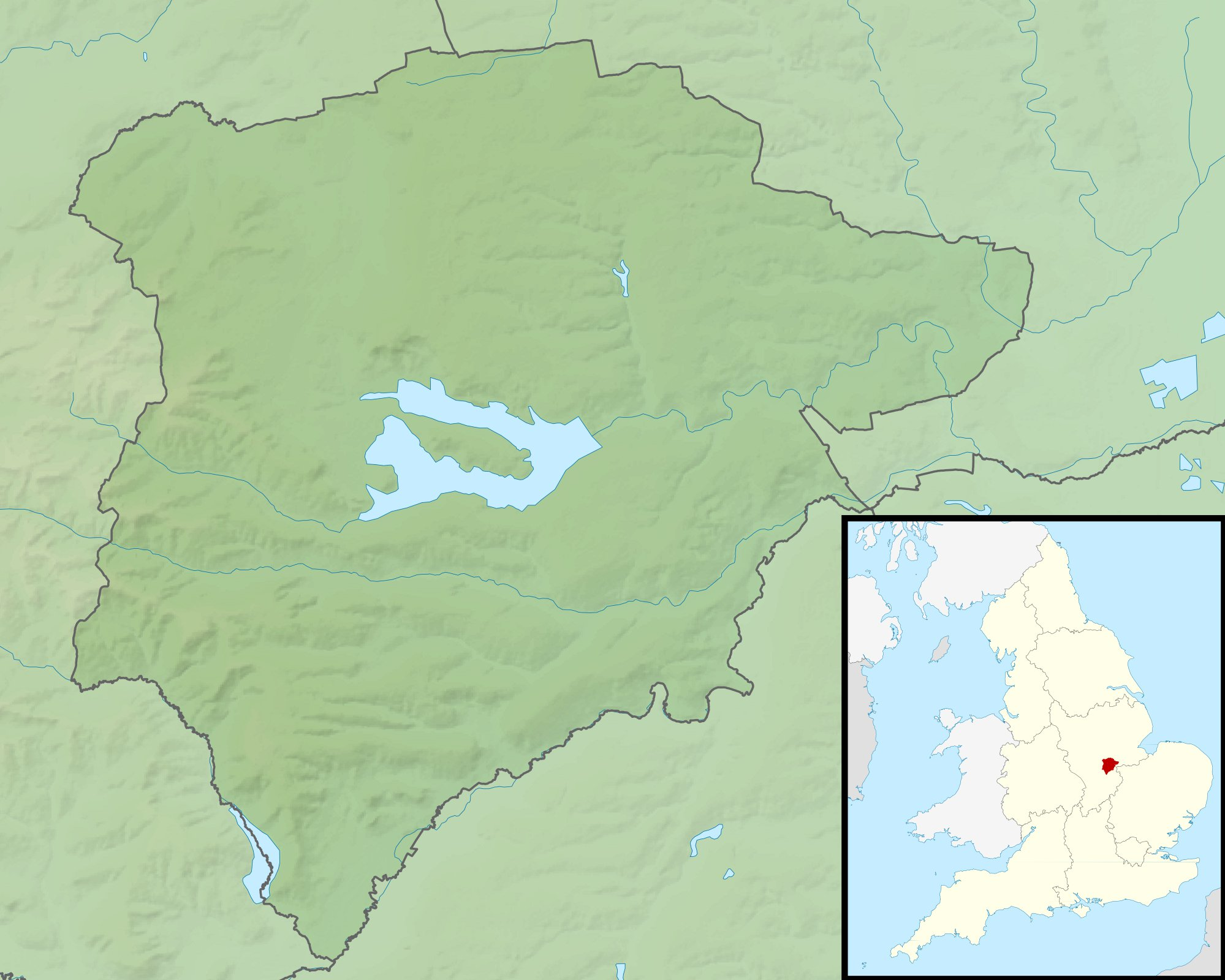
- Location within Rutland
- Location: Rutland
- Coordinates: 52°40′N 0°40′W
- Type: Reservoir
- Primary outflows: River Gwash
- Basin countries: England
- Managing agency: Anglian Water
- Designation: Site of Special Scientific Interest
- Built: 1971–1975
- First flooded: 1976
- Max. length: 4.4 miles (7.1 km)
- Max. width: 2.6 miles (4.2 km)
- Surface area: 10.86 square kilometres (4.19 sq mi)
- Average depth: 14 metres (46 ft)
- Max. depth: 34 metres (112 ft)
- Water volume: 124 million cubic metres (4.4×10^{9} cu ft)
- Surface elevation: 85 metres (279 ft)
- Website: https://anglianwaterparks.co.uk/rutland-water

Ramsar Wetland
- Designated: 14 October 1991
- Reference no.: 533

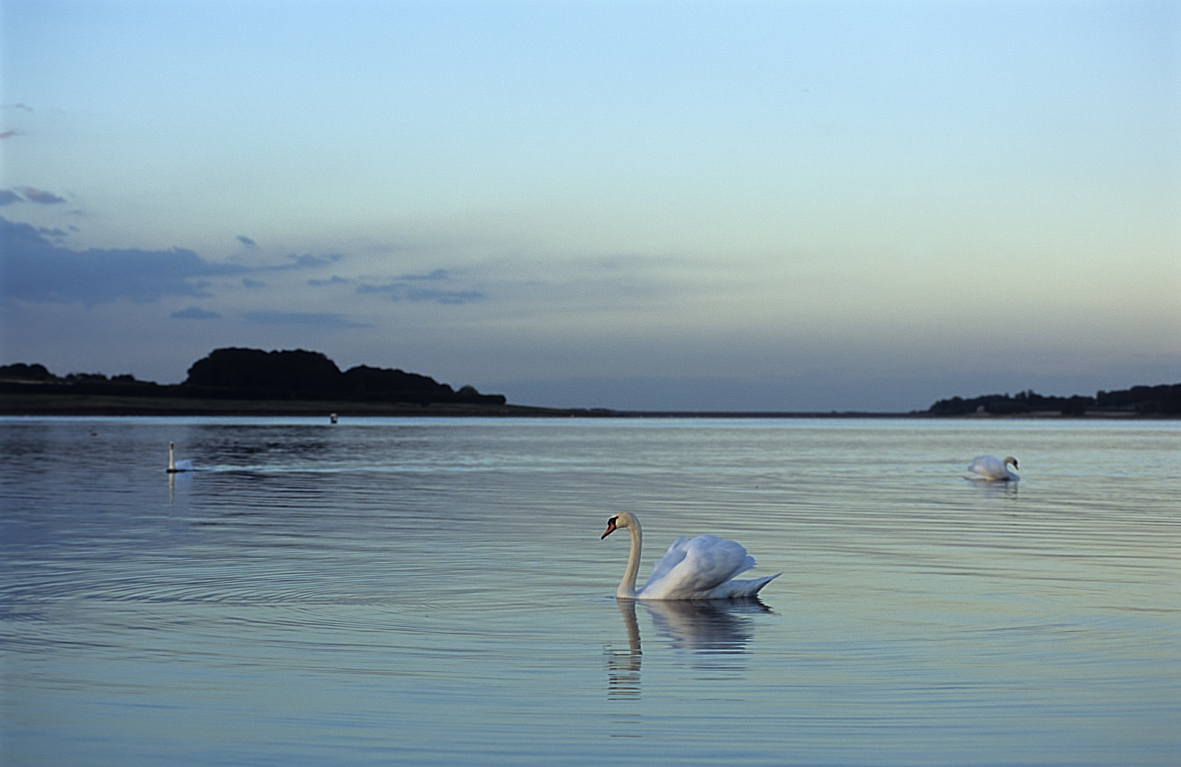
Mute swans on Rutland Water at dusk

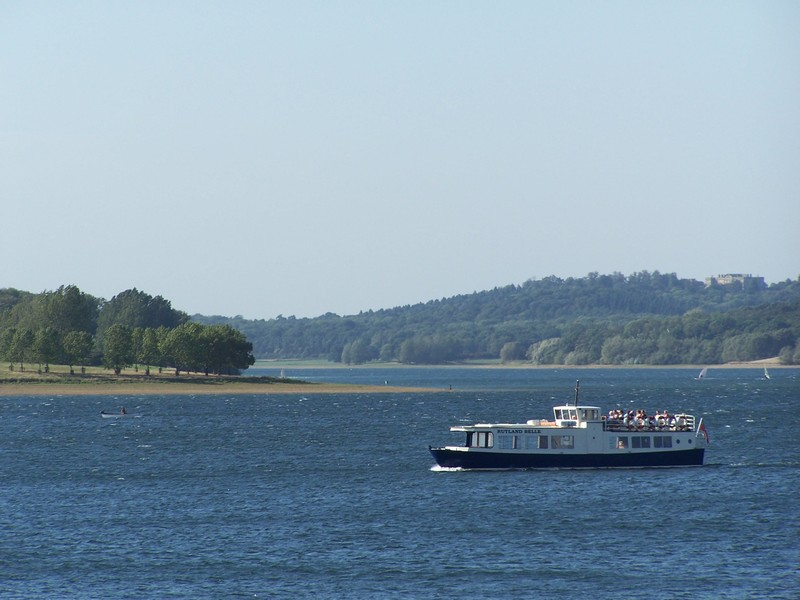
The Rutland Belle pleasure boat taking visitors across the water

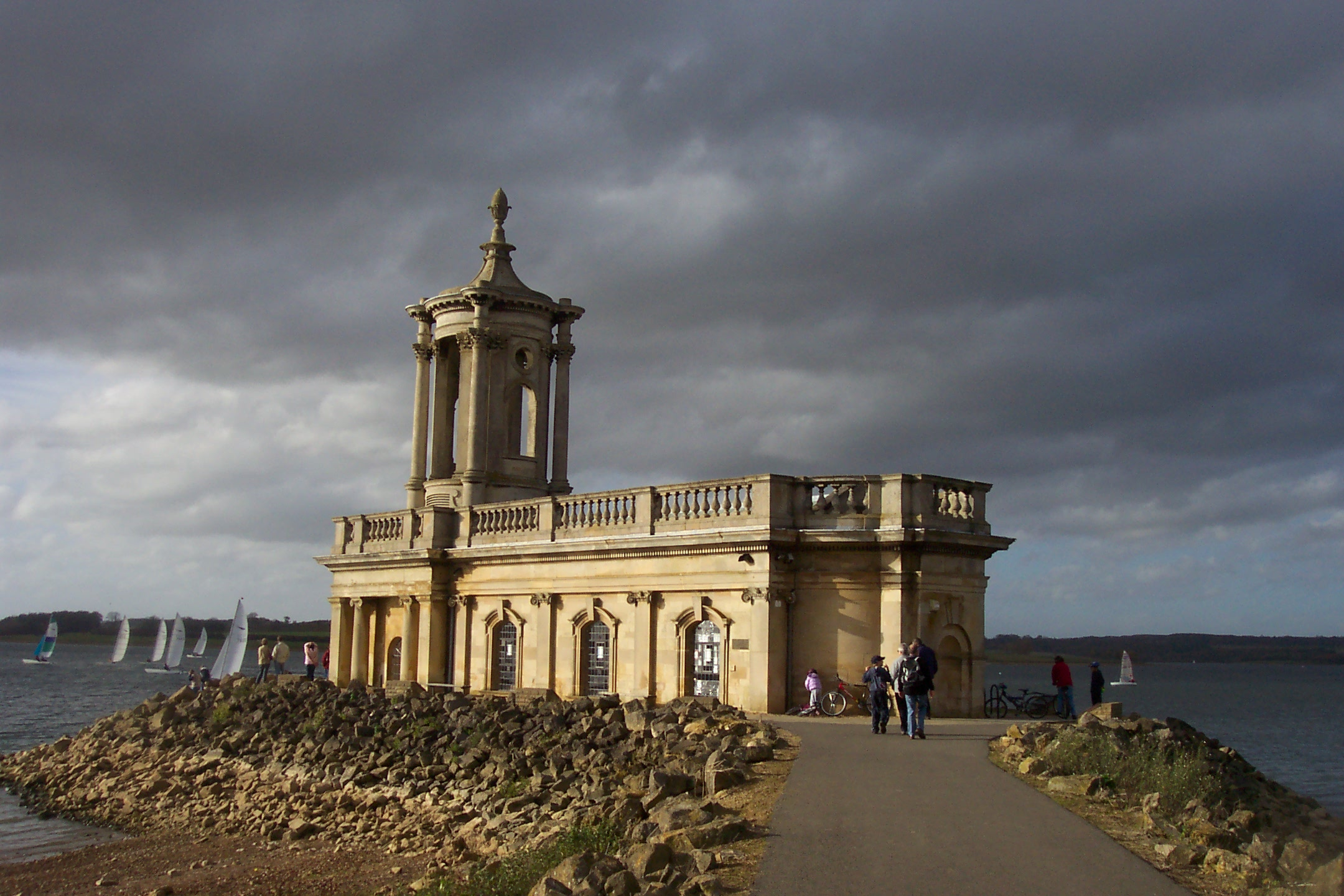
Sailing boats on the reservoir are visible behind Normanton church

Rutland Water is a reservoir, an artificial lake, in Rutland, England, east of Rutland's county town, Oakham. It is filled by pumping from the River Nene and River Welland, and provides water to the East Midlands. By surface area it is the largest artificial reservoir in the United Kingdom, but its capacity is exceeded by that of Kielder Water in Northumberland. Its maximum depth is 33 m (108 ft).

Set in 3,100 acres (1,300 hectares) of countryside, it has a 23-mile-perimeter (37 km) track (17 mi or 27 km excluding Hambleton Peninsula) for walking or cycling. Since the water is drawn upon when needed, the relative areas of land and water vary a little, but the flatter parts of the lake margin are enclosed by banks so that the wetland nature reserve is maintained (grid reference SK886073).

A 6 sq. mi. (1,555 hectare) area of lake and shore is a biological Site of Special Scientific Interest, and a Nature Conservation Review site. An area of 5¼ sq. mi, (1,333 hectares) is an internationally important wetland site under the Ramsar Convention, and 1½ sq. mi. (393 hectares) at the western end is managed by the Leicestershire and Rutland Wildlife Trust.

== Construction ==
The reservoir's construction, by damming the Gwash valley near Empingham, was completed in 1975. During its construction it was known as Empingham Reservoir. It flooded around 2½ sq. mi. (six or seven square kilometres) of the Gwash valley as well as the side valley, at the head of which lies Oakham. Nether Hambleton and most of Middle Hambleton were demolished and their wells were plugged as part of the ground preparation. Their neighbouring village of Upper Hambleton survived, and now sits on the Hambleton Peninsula. The Gwash makes a net input to the lake but its flow downstream is maintained. Most of the stored water is extracted from the River Welland at grid reference TF017060, between Tinwell and Stamford, and from the River Nene upstream from Peterborough, a city which is a major user of the water.

Because much of the valley is clay, material for the dam was extracted from pits dug within the area that would be subsequently flooded. The clay dam is 115 feet (35 m) high, and around 1,300 yards (1,200 m) long. At its base, it is up to 890 yards (810 m) wide, and the finished structure has been landscaped to blend in with the environment, even when viewed from Empingham, the nearest village.

Rutland Water contains a limnological tower for study of the reservoir's ecological conditions.

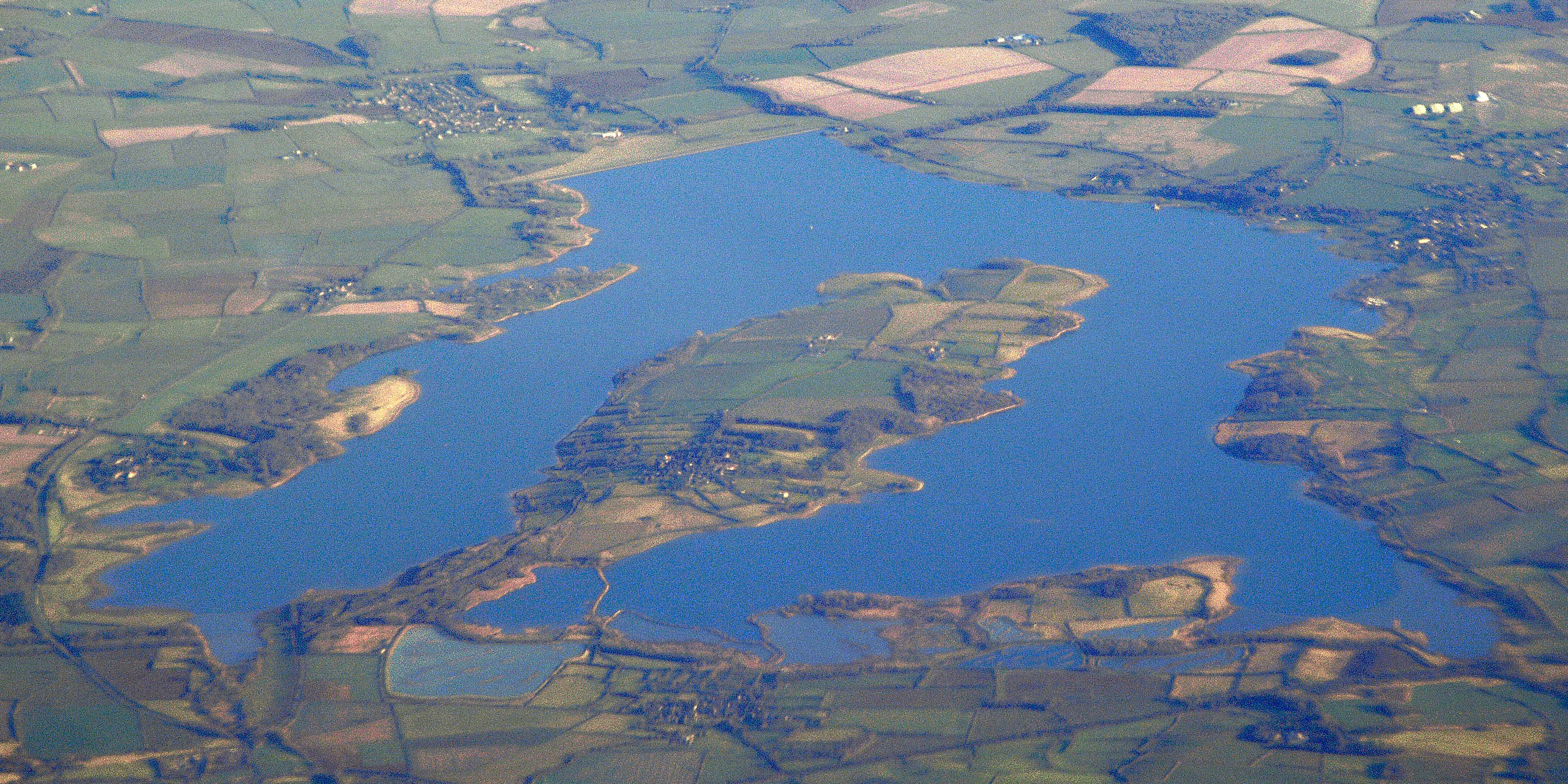
Aerial view from the west with the dam and Empingham in the top left

== Community ==
Upper Hambleton and the remnant of Middle Hambleton, including the Old Hall, are together now known simply as Hambleton and are to be found on a long peninsula in the middle of the lake, land that was formerly a ridge between the two valleys in which the lake now lies. The few houses of Normanton avoided flooding although its church did not. The lower part of the building was supported against water damage so that its upper part could be used to present the story of the construction of the reservoir to the public. Some funerary monuments from it can be seen at Edenham church, Lincolnshire.

== Recreation ==
The reservoir is used not just for water storage, but is a popular sports centre – as well as water sports such as sailing, visitors enjoy fishing, walking and cycling along a 25 miles (40 km) perimeter track. A pleasure cruiser, the Rutland Belle, carries people around the lake. Birdwatching brings visitors from far afield.

== Wildlife ==
Large areas of wetland (as well as several small woods) at the western end of the lake form a nature reserve, managed by Leicestershire and Rutland Wildlife Trust. The area is designated a Special Protection Area of international importance for its wintering populations of gadwall (some 4% of this species’ European population) and shoveler. It is home to the Anglian Water Bird Watching Centre. Every August, the centre was the venue for the British Birdwatching Fair until 2019. Other birds found here include lapwing, coot, goldeneye, tufted duck, pochard, teal, wigeon, cormorant, great crested grebe, little grebe and, most notably, osprey, which were re-introduced to the area during 1996, including one called "Mr Rutland". In 2021 there were 26 ospreys in the area of Rutland Water.

The lake is stocked with brown trout and rainbow trout, but there is a large head of coarse fish populated by water pumped in from the River Welland and River Nene, species include roach, bream, pike, zander, perch, eel, wels catfish and carp.

== Ichthyosaur ==
In early 2021 an ichthyosaur fossil was discovered during the routine draining of a lagoon at the reservoir by nature reserve manager Joe Davis. A Temnodontosaurus with a skeleton measuring about 30 feet (10 metres) in length and a skull weighing about a tonne, is the largest and most complete fossil of its kind found in the UK.

== Visitor centres ==
The Anglian Water Birdwatching Centre, located in Egleton, features a gift shop operated by Anglian Water and a shop selling binoculars and telescopes. The centre includes the Rutland Environmental Education Centre, exhibits, and windows overlooking the wetlands.

Rutland Water Visitor Centre, located at Sykes Lane, has a range of visitor leaflets & maps, knowledgeable staff, Rutland themed souvenirs & mini golf.

The Lyndon Visitor Centre is located on the reserve's south shore. There are exhibits, bird viewing windows, trails and hides.
