= Ainderby Quernhow =

Village and civil parish in North Yorkshire, England

Coordinates: 54.22311°N 1.46866°W

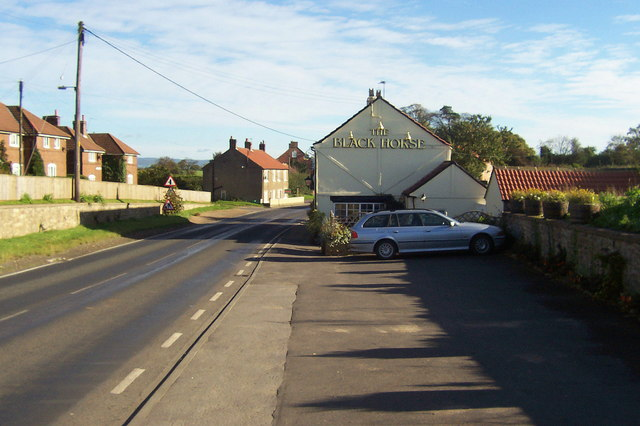
- The Black Horse, Ainderby Quernhow

- Location within North Yorkshire
- Population: 70 (2014)
- OS grid reference: SE347809
- Unitary authority: North Yorkshire
- Ceremonial county: North Yorkshire
- Region: Yorkshire and the Humber
- Country: England
- Sovereign state: United Kingdom
- Post town: THIRSK
- Postcode district: YO7
- Police: North Yorkshire
- Fire: North Yorkshire
- Ambulance: Yorkshire

Ainderby Quernhow is a village and civil parish in North Yorkshire, England. The village is situated on the B6267 Thirsk to Masham road just east of the A1(M) and is 6.3 miles (10.1 km) west of Thirsk. The population of the civil parish was estimated at 70 in 2014.

The Quernhow at Ainderby is a small mound on the nearby Roman Road which marked the boundary between the parishes of Ainderby and Middleton Quernhow. The mound at Ainderby Quernhow was demolished to make way for the upgrading of the A1(M) and its history is commemorated in a stone laid down in the grounds of the Quernhow Café which now adjoins the A6055.

Ainderby Mires and Ainderby Steeple are also in the district, the latter refers to the local church spire, the former to marshy mires.

From 1974 to 2023 it was part of the Hambleton District, it is now administered by the unitary North Yorkshire Council.

Ainderby is a place name originally meant village belonging to Eindrithi, a Viking whose name meant 'sole-ruler'. Quernhow, which has also been spelled Whernhowe and Whernou means mill-hill. The first element derives from the Old Norse word kvern meaning a mill stone. How, deriving from the Old Norse word haugr , means a hill. How is a common element in Yorkshire place names but rare in County Durham.

== Popular culture ==
Ainderby Quernhow is twice mentioned in popular culture; once in Douglas Adams' The Meaning of Liff (as a word describing those who claim to miss using the word 'gay' in its historical sense) and by The Independent as sounding like an actor who 'specializes in playing vacuous tennis-playing aristocrats.'

== See also ==
- Listed buildings in Ainderby Quernhow
