= Ampersand's Entertainment Guide =

Entertainment magazine

- September 1987 cover
- Editor: Judith Sims
- Categories: Entertainment
- Frequency: Quarterly
- Circulation: 1.2 million
- Publisher: Alan Weston Communications
- Founder: Jeffrey A. Dickey; Durand W. Achee
- First issue: 1977
- Final issue: 1989
- Country: United States
- Based in: Burbank, California
- ISSN: 0885-9469

Ampersand's Entertainment Guide was a magazine aimed at college students, providing articles about music, arts and entertainment. From 1977 to 1989 it was offered free as a supplement to various campus newspapers.

== History ==
The magazine began as Ampersand in 1977, founded by Jeffrey Alan Dickey and Durand Weston "Randy" Achee, published through their privately held company Alan Weston Communications based in Burbank, California. (The company name came from the men's middle names.) Ampersand was distributed as a free supplemental insert to college papers. The founders modeled the magazine after Parade, delivered as an insert to the Sunday editions of major metropolitan newspapers, drawing income from advertisements. Ampersand was initially financed with about $100,000 in capital, including a stake from Wolfman Jack, Achee's uncle. Early interest came from record labels who signed on as advertisers, hoping to sell albums to college students. By 1978, Ampersand was available at 50 colleges, increasing to 170 colleges by 1987.

The magazine was originally styled as "& Ampersand", with the typographic figure ampersand meaning "in addition to", matching the magazine's distribution model. It was published nine times during the school year, once a month from September to June. Ampersand changed its style to Ampersand's Entertainment Guide in 1987, and shifted to quarterly publication.

By 1988, the market for college magazines was seen as "glutted", with some major competitors shutting down such as Chris Whittle's Campus Voice and Newsweek's On Campus. Alan Weston Communications worked to gain market share by publishing additional campus magazines. In 1981, they tried Beyond, a science and technology-oriented college magazine, and in early 1985 a photography magazine called Break and then Freeze Frame, but these folded. In September 1985 they started College Woman which reached half a million students. They added Moving Up in early 1986, aimed at college men, and College Musician in September 1986, for music educators. Ampersand's Entertainment Guide was reported in 1987 as reaching 1.2 million students, the same as Newsweek's On Campus. Outside of the college market, Alan Weston Publishing produced The Movie Magazine in 1983.

== Staff ==
Ampersand's editor was Judith Sims, a music journalist who had been the editor of TeenSet magazine in the 1960s, a contributor to Melody Maker in the 1970s, and the Los Angeles Bureau chief for Rolling Stone. Sims later edited the Alan Weston publication The Movie Magazine. Other contributors to Ampersand included food writer Colman Andrews and music/film critic Jacoba Atlas. Music scholar Ed Cray joined in 1978.

== Closure ==
Alan Weston Publishing encountered difficulties with advertisers in 1988, and shut down all of their campus magazines in early 1989.
