= Brown Meggs =

American writer and record executive

- Meggs in 1964
- Born: Brown Moore Meggs; October 20, 1930; Los Angeles, California
- Died: October 8, 1997 (aged 66); San Francisco, California, U.S.
- Occupations: Writer, record executive

Brown Moore Meggs (October 20, 1930 – October 8, 1997) was an American writer and music executive with Capitol Records. Meggs is known for signing the Beatles to their first distribution contract in the United States. He started the music magazine TeenSet for Capitol in 1964, and founded Seraphim Records, a bargain label for classical music. After serving Capitol as chief operating officer for two years, he resigned in 1976 to concentrate on his writing. Capitol enticed him back in 1984 as the president of Angel Records; he revived the label for the digital age.

As a writer, he won Best Documentary from the Cowboy Hall of Fame for the 1962 documentary film Appaloosa, and he was nominated for the Edgar Award for his mystery novel Saturday Games (1974).

== Early life and career ==
Meggs was born in Los Angeles to Canadian-born painter and art director Charles Winfield Meggs and Margarette Brown Meggs. The Meggs line was originally English, settling along the Saint Lawrence River. His maternal ancestry was from Dutch immigrants to America who helped build the Erie Canal. His maternal grandparents were F. L. Moore of Los Angeles and Edward George Brown of Grosse Pointe, Michigan. His paternal grandfather was William E. Meggs of Gananoque, Ontario, Canada. Meggs had three younger sisters: Toby Winfield Meggs, Margarette "Peggy" Brown Meggs and Victoria "Vicky" McLaughlin Meggs.

Meggs' father took film scripts home from Paramount Pictures to evaluate them with regard to art direction, and Meggs eagerly read the scripts, preferring them to books. He wanted to be a scriptwriter, though he also played French horn and loved classical music. He attended two private schools: first Black-Foxe Military Institute in Hollywood, then St. Luke's in Connecticut. He took college courses at California Institute of Technology and Harvard University, graduating in English. During the Korean War he served with the U.S. Army in counterintelligence, stationed for a year in Japan. After the war, Meggs lived in Laguna Beach, writing freelance for magazines.

Meggs married Vassar-educated Boston socialite Nancy Bates Meachen on June 16, 1954, in the Old South Church of Boston, with a reception at the Algonquin Club; they took a road trip across the continent for their honeymoon, to make their home in Pasadena. They moved to Detroit by 1956 so Meggs could write industrial film scripts for the Jam Handy Organization. The couple had one son there, Brook Meachen Meggs, born on October 9, 1956.

== Capitol Records ==
Meggs joined Capitol Records, a subsidiary of EMI Records, in September 1958 as a manager of merchandising and promotion at the Los Angeles Capitol Records Building. In 1959 he was director of public relations, handling Capitol artists, and also EMI artists visiting from the UK. In March 1962, Capitol moved Meggs to New York City, and nine months later he rose to the position of director of operations for the U.S. East Coast, coordinating with his West Coast counterpart, Fred Martin. His preference for music was in the opera and classical genres, and he reorganized Angel Records, Capitol's classical imprint, for better profitability. Meggs signed an agreement between Angel and the Soviet label Melodiya, which allowed Angel to sell recordings of Soviet artists such as pianist Sviatoslav Richter and conductor Kirill Kondrashin.

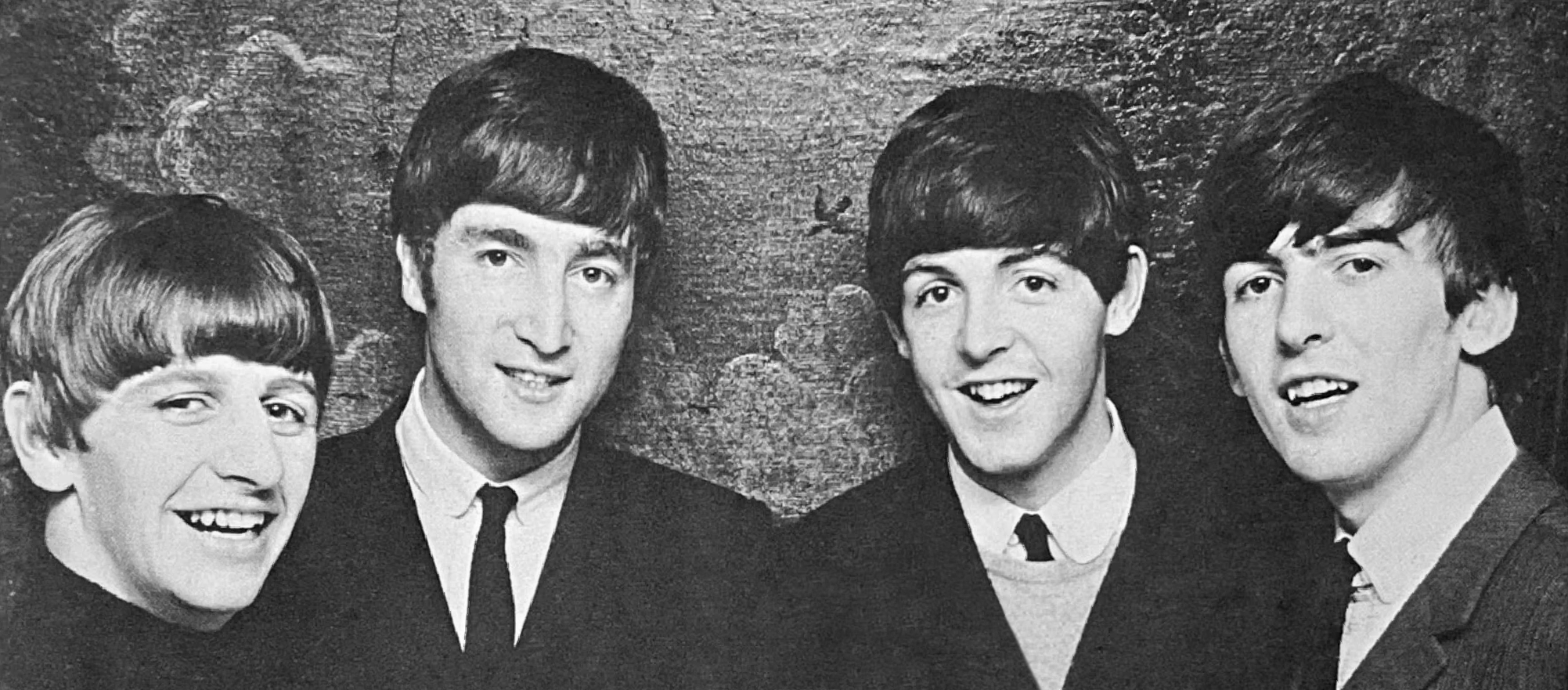
Meggs signed the Beatles to an American distribution deal

In early November 1963, Meggs met with Beatles manager Brian Epstein, who played him a demo copy of the single, "I Want to Hold Your Hand", recorded a few weeks earlier in London. Epstein had previously attempted to get the Beatles signed by Capitol, but the songs "Love Me Do" and "She Loves You" were not considered good enough by Capitol's Dave Dexter Jr., in charge of reviewing "foreign" recordings. Meanwhile, Beatles contract holder EMI had been insisting to Capitol head Alan W. Livingston that he accept the band's next song. With this pressure in mind, Meggs listened to the intentional American gospel elements of "I Want to Hold Your Hand" and predicted mass appeal; he immediately signed the Beatles to a major distribution deal. He promised Epstein that Capitol would mount a $40,000 promotional campaign in the states. Meggs discovered in early December that the UK single had amassed one million advance orders before it was released there on November 29. This meant that Capitol could expect much larger sales for their scheduled January 13 release. Capitol was faced with a new problem on December 17: a British copy of the single had been flown over the Atlantic to deejay Carroll James of WWDC in Maryland (serving Washington D.C.) who started broadcasting the song, stimulating demand. Other radio stations followed suit, obtaining their own copies by jet airliner. Capitol scrambled to advance the song's release date from January 13 to December 26, and to change the planned pressing from 200,000 to one million.

Meggs rolled out the promotional slogan, "The Beatles are coming!", on advertisements (left) and stickers.

Meggs hatched an unusual marketing idea: cover the country with warnings that "The Beatles Are Coming!", recalling Paul Revere's notional shout, "The British are coming!" In late December, Capitol paid for a small advertisement in Billboard magazine with the words "The Beatles Are Coming!" and a black mop-top haircut. Mop-top wigs were given to Capitol staff to wear. In early January 1964, the label distributed many thousands of 2-by-3-inch (51 by 76 mm) stickers carrying the slogan "The Beatles Are Coming!" and four mop-top silhouettes in reddish ink, given free to retail sales staff, radio station staff, high school students; anyone who would plaster them around their area. By February 1, 1964, the song reached number 1 in the US, one week before the Beatles appeared on The Ed Sullivan Show. Beatlemania had arrived in America. Music journalist Fred Bronson wrote retrospectively about "I Want to Hold Your Hand", saying, "Next to 'Rock Around the Clock', it is the most significant single of the rock era, permanently changing the course of music."

Meggs and Fred Martin arranged the Beatles' transportation, lodging, security and schedule in February 1964 during their first visit to New York City and Miami. On the way to John F. Kennedy International Airport to greet the band, Meggs studied the cover of the recently released album Meet the Beatles! upon which his secretary, Stacy Caraviotis, had pasted the name of each band member under the proper photograph, so that Meggs could recognize and address the Beatles by name. Meggs rode in the limousine with the Beatles, and accompanied them to press conferences. Meggs and Paul McCartney got on well together; in 1974 McCartney's Black Lab bore a litter of seven mixed-breed puppies, and he named one Brown Meggs. Meggs took the Beatles melody of "I Want to Hold Your Hand" and composed a French horn solo piece titled "Variations on 'Komm, gib mir deine Hand'", which he performed in the classical style in a New York concert.

Meggs conceived the idea of promoting Capitol artist the Beach Boys by way of a fan club magazine. He began the project in March 1964, announcing the fan club formation, and in October 1964 the first issue of The Teen Set magazine was provided as a free insert to the live album Beach Boys Concert. Meggs was the chief editor. Helping Meggs get the right mix was veteran teen magazine journalist and photographer Earl Leaf, serving as guest editor. Issue number two was published in March 1965, printed in a huge run of 500,000. Meggs told Billboard magazine that it was "the largest teen-oriented advertising-merchandising campaign in the history of CRDC [Capitol Records Distribution Company]." The first issue had been devoted to the Beach Boys exclusively, but the second issue also carried stories about Capitol artists Donna Loren, Bobby Rydell, Peter & Gordon and the Beatles. By November 1965, Meggs had replaced himself as editor with 25-year-old Judith Sims, who understood her readership and took TeenSet into new territory, forming it into one of the best teen magazines of the 1960s.

Capitol promoted Meggs to vice president of CRDC in 1964, in charge of merchandising, advertising and public relations, returning to the Hollywood offices, where he started on August 1. Meggs was one of three vice presidents of CRDC, reporting to President Stan Gortikov. Meggs immediately canceled Capitol's two conflicting contracts for advertising agencies, split between east and west coast rivalries, and hired Foote, Cone & Belding to cover all of Capitol's advertising needs.

Meggs founded Seraphim Records in September 1966, to promote high-quality recordings of classical music, sold at bargain prices. Seraphim remastered and re-issued classic recordings by famous artists of EMI such as composer-conductor Paul Hindemith and pianist Myra Hess. Seraphim also drew from unsold stock of other labels, primarily Angel Records, to give the titles another chance at a lower price. Meggs used the slogan, "Champagne at beer prices."

In 1967, Meggs hired graphic artist John Van Hamersveld on the strength of his artwork for the surfer film poster The Endless Summer. Hamersveld recalled that the first thing Meggs said to him was, "You are going to take this job and you can't turn it down." Meggs made Hamersveld his personal art director for Capitol; in that role Hamersveld created the covers for the Beatles' Magical Mystery Tour, the Rolling Stones' Exile on Main St., Skeletons from the Closet: The Best of Grateful Dead and many more.

In 1971, Meggs was promoted to worldwide marketing while still covering his old responsibilities in classical. He streamlined the sales side by cutting away one layer of management, removing four division manager positions. Capitol promoted him to chief operating officer in 1974, reporting to CEO Bhaskar Menon. In July 1976, Meggs resigned as COO of Capitol. He said, "It occurred to me that I didn't like to go to my office in the morning... I realized there were other things I wanted to do." His writing career had been secondary, and now he wanted to make it primary. He explained, "I've seen so many people come to bad ends staying with a career. If you do have personal goals and you're not moving toward them at an acceptable rate, there's no substitute for taking the gamble."

Capitol appealed to Meggs in 1984, asking him to return and focus solely on the classical side – his favorite aspect. He accepted the position of president of Angel Records, with more autonomy as a separate division of Capitol. Meggs revived the label by reissuing its titles on Compact Disc. He also reworked Seraphim Records by stopping all vinyl pressings, the bargain titles released only on Compact Cassette. Mid-priced lines were to be released on cassette and CD. Meggs left Capitol for the last time in 1990 after his wife was diagnosed with pancreatic cancer.

During his years at Capitol Records, Meggs worked most closely with pop artists such as the Beatles, the Beach Boys, the Band, Helen Reddy, Grand Funk Railroad, Steve Miller Band, Linda Ronstadt, Bobbie Gentry, and Leo Kottke. Despite his skill in the pop world, he preferred classical and opera music. Brook Meggs said in 1997 that his father liked the music of Bob Dylan and Joni Mitchell well enough, "and he certainly recognized the Beatles' talent. But from the time he was a kid, classical music was it for him."

== Author ==
Meggs wrote several non-fiction articles for magazines such as Esquire, True, and McCall's. In 1958, Meggs published an article about English race car driver Richard Seaman who drove for Mercedes-Benz. Seaman won the 1938 German Grand Prix but crashed and died the next year. Meggs' account appeared in the book Omnibus of Speed; a collection of short biographical pieces on race car drivers.

Sponsored by the Appaloosa Horse Club of Moscow, Idaho, Meggs wrote the script for the documentary film Appaloosa, narrated by television actor Dale Robertson, and shot in Idaho in 1961. Meggs co-directed the 30-minute color film with producer Fred Rice. It was named the best documentary in 1962 by the National Cowboy Hall of Fame and Western Heritage Center. The filmmakers each received a bronze statuette representing the Charles M. Russell painting Wrangler.

Meggs' 1974 book Saturday Games was nominated for the Edgar Allan Poe Awards in the category of Best First Novel, which was won in 1975 by Gregory Mcdonald for Fletch. Saturday Games was a crime mystery: its plot had three bachelor playboys implicated in the death of a free-spirited woman they had all known, and a police detective trying to find the truth. Meggs had first submitted the book to mystery editor Barbara Norville of Bobbs-Merrill Company, but she returned the manuscript with suggestions for improvement. Meggs reworked the book and published through Random House for more money.

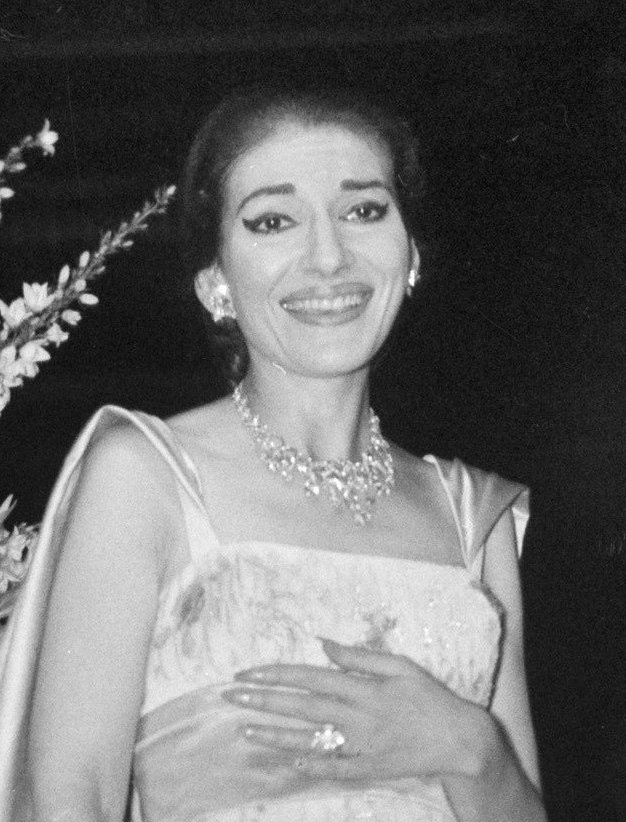
Meggs based his novel Aria on soprano Maria Callas

His 1978 novel Aria revealed the inner workings of the classical record company in their struggle to produce a recording of Giuseppe Verdi's Otello. The New York Times called it "required reading" for anyone contemplating the record industry. The story is based in part on the debacle of Maria Callas attempting to record La traviata for EMI for more than a decade, the project finally canceling after Aristotle Onassis stopped funding it in 1968 when he left Callas for Jacqueline Bouvier Kennedy.

In 1981, Meggs wrote a historic novel, The War Train, about American soldiers enduring a hellish train ride in March 1916 to Hachita, New Mexico, intending to cross the border and fight Pancho Villa in Mexico. Meggs took the kernel of the story from tales told by his step-grandfather who had been on the train. By studying microfilm records of the cavalry unit, Meggs confirmed the facts of the narrative. A film based on the book was being considered by Mace Neufeld, but the project was ultimately dropped. The Detroit Free Press reviewed The War Train positively except for the mistake of positioning Ty Cobb as shortstop rather than outfielder.

In 1986, Meggs wrote Two Fathers' Justice, a television drama film about two fathers reacting to the deaths of their son and daughter, and seeking justice. Meggs co-wrote the sequel, Two Fathers: Justice for the Innocent (1994).

== Personal life ==
In 1959 or 1960, Meggs' parents moved to Grass Valley, California, where his mother served on the city council. She ran for state senator in 1964 as the "fighting grandma" or "battling grandmother" candidate but lost to Paul J. Lunardi.

Meggs played French horn from his school days. In 1964, he obtained a rare French horn from master builder Herbert Fritz Knopf, instrument maker in Markneukirchen, Saxony, East Germany. Though Knopf was behind the Iron Curtain, Meggs' contacts with Melodiya helped convey the four-valve, B-flat instrument out from under Soviet Union control.

Meggs first lived with his wife in Pasadena, then Detroit, returning to Greater Los Angeles, then New York City in 1962, moving to La Cañada, California, in July 1964. By 1976, the Meggs were back in Pasadena in the hills west of the Rose Bowl Stadium, in a home designed by and for architect Roland Logan Russell in 1961. The hexagonal-plan home, organized around a central atrium, has been featured as an outstanding example of mid-century modern architecture. It was listed for sale in 2017 at $3.3 million.

Meggs' wife Nancy died in 1990 of pancreatic cancer. He moved to an apartment in the Russian Hill neighborhood of San Francisco where he died in 1997 from a brain hemorrhage. Their singer-songwriter son, Brook, lived in California, New York and Texas, but after his father died, he moved to Sudbury, Massachusetts, where his mother had been raised. Much of the historic Meachen family property, 36.5 acres (14.8 ha) of farmland known as the Meachen-Meggs parcel, was sold to the city in 1999 for $3.5 million to be held in public trust for conservation purposes. It is now called Poor Farm Meadows Conservation Land.

== Writings ==
- 1958 – "Seaman: The Daring Young Man on Mercedes-Benz", in Charles Beaumont and William F. Nolan Omnibus of Speed, G.P. Putnam's Sons
- 1962 – Appaloosa. Color documentary film, 30 minutes.
- 1974 – Saturday Games. Random House. ISBN 978-0394488462
- 1975 – The Matter of Paradise: A Novel. Random House. ISBN 9780394496276
- 1978 – Aria: A Novel. Atheneum. ISBN 978-0689108327
- 1981 – The War Train: A Novel of 1916. Atheneum. ISBN 9780689110528
- 1986 – Two Fathers' Justice. Television drama, 120 minutes.
- 1994 – Two Fathers: Justice for the Innocent. Television drama, 91 minutes.
