= Kimberly Stewart =

American socialite, TV personality, and model

- Born: Kimberly Alana Stewart; August 20, 1979 (age 46); Los Angeles, California, U.S.
- Occupations: Model; television personality; actress
- Children: 2
- Parents: Rod Stewart (father); Alana Stewart (mother)
- Relatives: Ashley Hamilton (half-brother); Ruby Stewart (half-sister)
- Modeling information
- Height: 5 ft 10 in (178 cm)

Kimberly Alana Stewart (born August 20, 1979) is an American socialite, television personality, and model. She is the daughter of the British singer Rod Stewart and the American actress and model Alana Stewart.

== Early life ==
Stewart was born on August 20, 1979, in Holmby Hills, Los Angeles, California. She is the second of Rod Stewart's eight children and second of Alana Stewart's three children. She is of Scottish and English descent through her father, who moved to the United States in 1975. She spent several years studying acting with Ivana Chubbuck. Stewart studied in London.

George Hamilton is the father of her older half-brother Ashley Hamilton.

== Career ==
=== The Realm by Kimberly Stewart ===
In January 2021, Stewart started The Realm by Kimberly Stewart, a luxury organization company based in Los Angeles, New York, and Palm Beach. Stewart and her team offer organization, declutter, unpacking, and design services for closets, bedrooms, bathrooms, pantries, kitchens, offices, garages, and more.

=== Acting ===
Stewart has worked as an actress, and includes a leading role in Going to California, written by Scott Rosenberg and directed by Ted Demme, and appearing in one episode of Judd Apatow's series, "Undeclared." Stewart's first film was James Toback′s Black and White, which also starred Robert Downey Jr. and Jared Leto. In 2011 Stewart starred in the movie Homecoming, written and directed by Sean Hackett.

=== Fashion ===
Stewart has appeared on the covers for Tatler and German Vanity Fair, which Bryan Adams shot; and she has worked with fashion companies including Tommy Hilfiger, American Vogue, L'uomo Vogue, Elle, Italian Vogue, Vanity Fair, MaxMara, Richard Tyler, Catherine Malandrino, underwear line Ultimo, Tatler, InStyle, House of Field, and Chrome Hearts.

Stewart realized an early ambition, at age 19, when she launched her own fashion collection – "Pinky Starfish." Known for its dresses made from French vintage fabrics, the range was sold in Tracey Ross, Lisa Kline and Barney's.

=== Modeling ===
On September 9, 2008, the Atlanta-based band Elevation released a music video for its single, "Razoreyes", starring Stewart.

Stewart posed nude in 2008 in the British society magazine Tatler. The photographer was Canadian musician and photographer Bryan Adams. Stewart had previously posed nude with a crucifix in Italian Vogue.

== Personal life ==
On April 11, 2011, Benicio del Toro's publicist announced that Stewart was pregnant with their child. Stewart gave birth to a daughter on August 21, 2011.

== Filmography ==
Film

| Year | Film | Role | Notes |
|---|---|---|---|
| 1999 | Black and White | Girl at Bar | Uncredited |
| 2011 | Homecoming | Jane | |
| 2012 | Lost Lake | Kim | |

Television

| Year | Title | Role | Notes |
|---|---|---|---|
| 1998 | Pacific Blue | N/A | Episode: "Glass Houses" |
| 2001 | Going to California | Claire | Episode: "Pilot" |
| 2002 | Undeclared | Amanda Haythe | Episode: "Parents' Weekend" |
| 2007 | Never Mind The Buzzcocks | Herself | Season 21 Episode 1 |
| 2007 | Living with... Kimberly Stewart | Herself | 10 episodes; Also producer |
| 2010 | Hercule Poirot | Doris | Episode: "Three Act Tragedy"; Uncredited |
| 2015 | Stewarts & Hamiltons | Herself | 8 episodes |

Music videos

| Year | Music Video | Artist | Role |
|---|---|---|---|
| 1998 | "Industrial Is Dead" | Fine feat. Ashley Hamilton | Girlfriend |
| 2001 | "Revolving Door" | Crazy Town | Woman |
| 2008 | "Razoreyes" | Elevation | |
