= A Farewell to Arms (TV series) =

1966 British TV film by Rex Tucker

- Genre: Drama
- Based on: A Farewell to Arms by Ernest Hemingway
- Written by: Giles Cooper
- Directed by: Rex Tucker
- Starring: Vanessa Redgrave; George Hamilton; Susan Engel
- Country of origin: United Kingdom
- Original language: English
- No. of series: 1
- No. of episodes: 3 (all missing)

Production
- Producer: Douglas Allen
- Running time: 45 minutes
- Production company: BBC

Original release
- Network: BBC2
- Release: 15 February – 1 March 1966

A Farewell to Arms is a 1966 British television adaptation of Ernest Hemingway's 1929 novel A Farewell to Arms that aired on three consecutive weeks (15 February, 22 February – 1 March 1966). The series starred Vanessa Redgrave, George Hamilton, Susan Engel and Erik Chitty and was directed by Rex Tucker.

Despite receiving critical praise and an enthusiastic response from audiences, all three episodes were later wiped and are believed to be lost.

== Episodes ==
- That Summer There Were Many Victories - 15 February 1966
- We Knew the Summer Was Gone - 22 February 1966
- Like Saying Goodbye to a Statue - 1 March 1966

== Cast ==
- Vanessa Redgrave as Catherine Barkley
- George Hamilton as Lt. Frederick Henry
- Susan Engel as Staff Nurse
- Erik Chitty as Waiter
- Ann Rye as Fergy
- Carl Jaffe as Doctor
- Maureen Lane as Nurse
- Laurence Payne as Lieutenant Rinaldi
- Jean Benedetti as Aldo
- Peter Elliott as Major
- David Spenser as Priest
- George Zenios as Piani
- Donald Sutherland as Sim
- Ellen Pollock as Miss Van Campen
- Michael Mellinger as Captain
- Glenys Marshall as Probationer
- Francis De Wolff as Valentini
- David Rayner as Sergeant

== Reception ==
The Observer said Redgrave gave a "brilliant performance".
