= The Wondergirls =

American rock band

- Origin: Los Angeles, California, USA
- Genres: Hard rock, industrial rock
- Years active: 1999–2000, 2013
- Past members: Ken Andrews; Ian Astbury; Doug Ardito; Jay Gordon; Martyn LeNoble; Shannon Leto; Chris Lloyd; Mark McGrath; Ryan Shuck; Troy Van Leeuwen; Scott Weiland

The Wondergirls was a short-lived American rock supergroup and side project formed in 1999. In its initial, short-lived incarnation, the band featured Stone Temple Pilots frontman Scott Weiland, Mark McGrath of Sugar Ray, Ian Astbury of The Cult, Shannon Leto of Thirty Seconds to Mars, Jay Gordon and Ryan Shuck of Orgy and Julien-k, Doug Ardito of Puddle of Mudd, Ken Andrews of Failure, Martyn LeNoble of Porno for Pyros, and Troy Van Leeuwen of Queens of the Stone Age. The Wondergirls recorded two songs, "Let's Go All the Way" and "Drop That Baby", featuring Ashley Hamilton and Chris Lloyd of Fine.

The project was revived in 2013, and a new version of "Let's Go All the Way" was included on the Iron Man 3 soundtrack, in which Ashley Hamilton played the character Firepower. The song also features British singer Robbie Williams.

== Band members ==
- Ken Andrews – guitar, synth
- Ian Astbury – vocals, guitar, harmonica, percussion
- Doug Ardito – keyboards
- Jay Gordon – vocals, synth
- Martyn LeNoble – bass guitar
- Shannon Leto – drums
- Mark McGrath – vocals
- Ryan Shuck – guitar
- Troy Van Leeuwen – guitar
- Scott Weiland – vocals, keyboards
- Ashley Hamilton – vocals
- Chris Lloyd – guitar
