= Stewarts & Hamiltons =

- Genre: Reality television
- Starring: Kimberly Stewart; Alana Stewart; George Hamilton; Ashley Hamilton; Sean Stewart; George Hamilton Jr
- Country of origin: United States
- Original language: English
- No. of seasons: 1
- No. of episodes: 8

Production
- Executive producers: Jonathan Murray; Gil Goldschein; Jeff Jenkins; Farnaz Farjam; Chris Ray
- Camera setup: Multiple
- Running time: 42 minutes
- Production company: Bunim/Murray Productions

Original release
- Network: E!
- Release: July 26 – September 7, 2015

Stewarts & Hamiltons is an American reality documentary television series. Announced in April, the eight-part one-hour television series debuted on July 26, 2015 on the E! network. The show follows the blended families of Alana Stewart, including her children Kimberly Stewart, Ashley Hamilton and Sean Stewart, as well as her ex-husband and now best friend George Hamilton. In October 2015, the show was cancelled after airing one season.

== Episodes ==
No.	Title	Original release date	U.S. viewers (millions)
1	"Meet the Stewarts and Hamiltons"	July 26, 2015	0.94
2	"Stewed Awakening Pt.1"	August 2, 2015	0.42
3	"Stewed Awakening Pt.2"	August 9, 2015	0.35
4	"The Loyal Family"	August 16, 2015	0.48
5	"A Can of Worms"	August 23, 2015	0.27
6	"Family Trippin'"	August 30, 2015	0.31
7	"Don'T Mess With Texas"	September 6, 2015	0.30
8	"It's a Family Thing"	September 7, 2015	0.30

== Broadcast ==
The series premiered in Australia and New Zealand on July 28, 2015 on E! Australia, and in the United Kingdom on the same day.
