= G&A =

G&A might refer to:

- Selling, General and Administrative Expenses, an accounting concept
- George & Alana, a 90s television show
- Guns & Ammo, a magazine dedicated to firearms and related topics
