= With a Little Help from My Friends =

1967 song by the Beatles

- Sheet music cover

Song by the Beatles

from the album Sgt. Pepper's Lonely Hearts Club Band
- Released: 26 May 1967
- Recorded: 29–30 March 1967
- Studio: EMI, London
- Genre: Pop rock
- Length: 2:46
- Label: Parlophone (UK); Capitol (US)
- Songwriter: Lennon–McCartney
- Producer: George Martin

Audio
- "With a Little Help from My Friends" by the Beatles on YouTube

"With a Little Help from My Friends" is a song recorded by English rock band the Beatles for their 1967 album Sgt. Pepper's Lonely Hearts Club Band. It was written by John Lennon and Paul McCartney, and is sung by drummer Ringo Starr (as Sgt. Pepper singer Billy Shears), as his lead vocal for the album. As the second track on the album, it segues from the applause on the title track.

A subsequent recording of the track by Joe Cocker from his album of the same name became a success in 1968—topping the UK Singles Chart—and an anthem for the Woodstock era. In 1978, the Beatles' recording, paired with "Sgt. Pepper's Lonely Hearts Club Band", was reissued as a single, and peaked at number 63 in Britain and number 71 on the United States Billboard Hot 100. Starr has regularly performed the song in concert as a solo artist. The song was ranked number 311 on Rolling Stone's list of the 500 Greatest Songs of All Time.

== Background and composition ==
John Lennon and Paul McCartney finished writing the song in mid-March 1967, written specifically as Ringo Starr's track for the Beatles album Sgt. Pepper's Lonely Hearts Club Band. McCartney said: "It was pretty much co-written, John and I doing a work song for Ringo, a little craft job." In 1970 Lennon stated: "Paul had the line about 'a little help from my friends.' He had some kind of structure for it, and we wrote it pretty well fifty-fifty from his original idea", but in 1980 Lennon said: "This is Paul, with a little help from me. 'What do you see when you turn out the light/ I can't tell you, but I know it's mine...' is mine." It was briefly called "Bad Finger Boogie" (later the inspiration for the band name Badfinger), supposedly because Lennon composed the melody on a piano using his middle finger after having hurt his forefinger.

Lennon and McCartney deliberately wrote a tune with a limited range – except for the last note, which McCartney worked closely with Starr to achieve. In The Beatles Anthology, Starr explained that he insisted on changing the first line – which originally was "What would you think if I sang out of tune? Would you throw ripe tomatoes at me?", and was changed to end with "Would you stand up and walk out on me?" – so that fans would not throw tomatoes at him should he perform it live (in the early days, after George Harrison made a passing comment that he liked Jelly Babies, the group was showered with them at all of their live performances).

After it was released in the United States, Maryland Governor and future Vice President Spiro T. Agnew lobbied to have the song banned because he believed it was about drug use.

== Recording ==
The Beatles began recording the song on 29 March 1967, the day before they posed for the Sgt. Pepper album cover. They recorded 10 takes of the song, wrapping up sessions at 5:45 in the morning. The backing track consisted of Starr on drums, McCartney playing piano, Harrison playing lead guitar and Lennon beating a cowbell. At dawn, Starr trudged up the stairs to head home – but the other Beatles cajoled him into doing his lead vocal then and there, standing around the microphone for moral support. The following day they added tambourine, backing vocals, bass, and more electric guitar. American TeenSet editor Judith Sims interviewed each Beatle separately on the 29th as they became available. Others in the studio at various times included roadies Mal Evans and Neil Aspinall, publicists Tony Barrow and Terry Doran, photographers Leslie Bryce and Frank Herrmann, and Cynthia Lennon.

== Personnel ==
According to Ian MacDonald:

The Beatles

- Ringo Starr – lead vocal, drums, tambourine
- John Lennon – backing vocal, rhythm guitar, cowbell
- Paul McCartney – backing vocal, piano, bass
- George Harrison – backing vocal, lead guitar

Additional musician

- George Martin – Hammond organ

== Live performances ==
Harrison and Starr performed this song together for the first time at the Prince's Trust in London, 1986 with Eric Clapton. McCartney and Starr performed the song together for the first time since 1967 at the David Lynch Foundation Benefit Concert in the Radio City Music Hall, New York on 4 April 2009. McCartney and Starr also performed the song together on The Night That Changed America: A Grammy Salute to The Beatles, a commemorative show on 27 January 2014, that marked 50 years since the band's first appearance on The Ed Sullivan Show in 1964.

== Certifications ==
Region	Certification	Certified units/sales
New Zealand (RMNZ)	Gold	15,000^{‡}
United Kingdom (BPI)	Silver	200,000^{‡}
^{‡} Sales+streaming figures based on certification alone.

== Cover versions ==
There have been at least 50 cover versions of the song and it has achieved the number one position on the UK Singles Chart three times: by Joe Cocker in 1968, by Wet Wet Wet in 1988, and by Sam & Mark in 2004.

=== Joe Cocker version ===
"With a Little Help from My Friends"
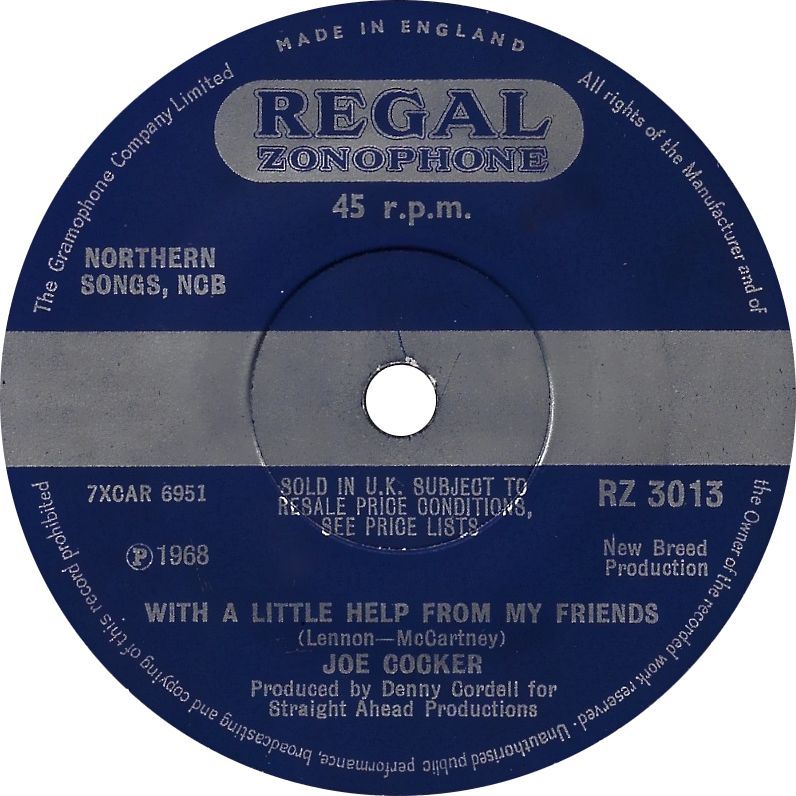
- Solid centre variant of the UK single

Single by Joe Cocker

from the album With a Little Help from My Friends
- B-side: "Something's Coming On"
- Released: October 1968 (UK)
- Recorded: 1968
- Genre: Blue-eyed soul; gospel
- Length: 5:12
- Label: Regal Zonophone (UK); A&M (US)
- Songwriter: Lennon–McCartney
- Producer: Denny Cordell

Joe Cocker UK singles chronology
"Marjorine" (1968)	"With a Little Help from My Friends" (1968)	"Delta Lady" (1969)

Audio
- "With a Little Help from My Friends" (studio) on YouTube
- "With a Little Help from My Friends" (live at Woodstock 1969) on YouTube

Live video
- "With a Little Help from My Friends" (live at Rockpalast) on YouTube

Joe Cocker US singles chronology
"Marjorine" (1968)	"With a Little Help from My Friends" (1968)	"Feeling Alright" (1969)

English singer Joe Cocker's 1968 version of "With a Little Help from My Friends" for his album of the same name was a radical re-arrangement of the original, inspired by Cocker's influences of Aretha Franklin and Ray Charles. Recorded by Denny Cordell and Tony Visconti and mixed by Tony Visconti, it used a slower tempo and different time signature than the original, and deployed different chords in the middle eight while adding a lengthy instrumental introduction. The recording featured drums by Procol Harum's B.J. Wilson, guitar lines from Jimmy Page, and keyboards by Tommy Eyre as well as prominent backing vocals. After recording the song, Cocker and record producer Denny Cordell brought it to Paul McCartney, who later said of the recording, "it was just mind blowing, totally turned the song into a soul anthem and I was forever grateful for him for doing that."

Cocker's version of the song reached number one on the UK Singles Chart on the week of 6–12 November 1968. The version also peaked at number 68 on the Billboard Hot 100 (US) on the week of 14 December, number two on the Dutch Top 40 (Netherlands) on the week of 9 November, and number one on Swiss Hitparade's top 100 singles chart on the week of 3 December. In Belgium's Ultratop 50 singles charts, it also peaked at number one on the Wallonia chart on the weeks of 14 and 21 December and number eight on the Flanders chart on the week of 7 December.

Cocker performed the song at Woodstock in 1969 and that performance was included in the documentary film, Woodstock. Two weeks later he performed it at the Isle of Wight Festival 1969. This version gained even more fame in 1988 when it was used as the opening theme song for the television series The Wonder Years. In 2002 he would perform the song at the Party at the Palace held at Buckingham Palace Garden in commemoration of the Golden Jubilee of Queen Elizabeth II. In 2014, a BBC poll saw it voted the seventh best cover song ever. In 2001, Cocker's version of the song was inducted into the Grammy Hall of Fame.

==== Personnel ====
- Joe Cocker – lead vocals
- Jimmy Page – guitar
- Chris Stainton – bass
- Tommy Eyre – keyboards
- B.J. Wilson – drums
- Madeline Bell – backing vocals
- Rosetta Hightower – backing vocals
- Patrice Holloway – backing vocals
- Sunny Wheetman – backing vocals

==== Charts ====
Chart (1968)	Peak position
Belgium (Ultratop 50 Wallonia)	1
Belgium (Ultratop 50 Flanders)	8
Canada Top Singles (RPM)	36
Netherlands (Dutch Top 40)	2
New Zealand (Listener)	12
Switzerland (Schweizer Hitparade)	1
UK Singles (Official Charts)	1
US Billboard Hot 100	68
US Cash Box Top 100	54

==== Certifications ====
Region	Certification	Certified units/sales
United Kingdom (BPI)	Silver	200,000^{‡}
^{‡} Sales+streaming figures based on certification alone.

=== Wet Wet Wet version ===
"With a Little Help from My Friends"

Single by Wet Wet Wet

from the album Sgt. Pepper Knew My Father
- B-side: "She's Leaving Home" (performed by Billy Bragg and Cara Tivey; as a double A side)
- Released: 9 May 1988
- Studio: Park Lane (Scotland)
- Genre: Pop rock
- Length: 2:34
- Label: The Precious Organization
- Songwriter: Lennon–McCartney
- Producer: Wet Wet Wet

Wet Wet Wet singles chronology
"Temptation" (1988)	"With a Little Help from My Friends" (1988)	"Sweet Surrender" (1989)

Music video
- "With a Little Help from My Friends" on YouTube

In 1988, Scottish soft rock band Wet Wet Wet covered the song for the Sgt. Pepper's Lonely Hearts Club Band tribute album Sgt. Pepper Knew My Father. The song was released as a single in May 1988 double-A-sided with another cover from the album, "She's Leaving Home" by Billy Bragg and Cara Tivey. Wet Wet Wet's version debuted at number 5 on the UK Singles Chart on 14 May 1988. The song was released in aid of the charity ChildLine.

==== Charts ====
Chart (1988)	Peak position
UK Singles (Official Charts)	1

==== Certifications ====
Certifications for "With a Little Help from My Friends"
Region	Certification	Certified units/sales
United Kingdom (BPI)	Silver	250,000^{^}
^{^} Shipments figures based on certification alone.

=== Sam & Mark version ===
"With a Little Help from My Friends"

Single by Sam & Mark
- B-side: "Measure of a Man"
- Released: 9 February 2004
- Recorded: 2003
- Genre: Pop rock
- Label: 19 Recordings
- Songwriter: Lennon–McCartney
- Producer: David Eriksen

Sam & Mark singles chronology
"With a Little Help from My Friends" (2004)	"The Sun Has Come Your Way" (2004)

The UK duo Sam & Mark released a cover of the song in 2004 after coming third and second in the second and final series of Pop Idol. Their version topped the UK Singles Chart.

==== Track listing ====
1. "With a Little Help from My Friends" – 3:08
2. "Measure of a Man" – 4:00
3. "With a Little Help from My Friends" (music video) – 3:08

==== Personnel ====
- Arrangement – Sindre Hotvedt, David Eriksen
- Conductor – Sindre Hotvedt
- Backing vocals – Håkon Iversen, Mariann Lisland
- Electric piano [Fender Rhodes] – Martin Sjolie
- Assistant engineer – Nick Taylor
- Guitar – Eivind Aarset
- Strings – Sindre Hotvedt, Oslo Session Strings
- Keyboards, drum programming, drums (additional live) – David Eriksen
- Mixing – Niklas Flyckt
- Assistant mixing – Jonas Östman
- Assistant producer – Martin Sjolie
- Producer – David Eriksen
- Recording – David Eriksen
- Mastering – Richard Dowling

==== Charts ====
Chart (2004)	Peak position
Ireland (IRMA)	22
UK Singles (Official Charts)	1

=== Other covers ===
Two versions of the song made the UK Singles Chart in 1967. The Young Idea's version from their album of the same name peaked at number ten and spent six weeks in the listing, while a version by Joe Brown charted at the same time, peaking at number 32 and remaining in the chart for four weeks.

Encouraged by Columbia Records president Clive Davis to update her image, Barbra Streisand recorded three Beatles songs for her 1969 album What About Today? including "With a Little Help from My Friends".

The Canadian band Kick Axe reached number 79 in Canada with their version from their album Welcome to the Club on 18 January 1986.

In 2018, the track was released as a charity benefit by the NHS Voices with all benefits going to the UK National Health Service (NHS). The charity version reached only number 89 and stayed just one week on the UK chart.

== Bibliography ==
- The Beatles (2000). The Beatles Anthology. San Francisco: Chronicle Books. ISBN 0-8118-2684-8.
- Chianello, Joanne (2 October 2009). "Harper gets on stage with a little help from his wife". Ottawa Citizen. Archived from the original on 6 October 2009.
- Dowlding, William J. (1989). Beatlesongs. New York: Simon & Schuster. ISBN 0-671-68229-6.
- Everett, Walter (1999). The Beatles as Musicians: Revolver Through the Anthology. Oxford University Press. ISBN 978-0-19-512941-0.
- Fries, Colin, ed. (30 November 2009). "Chronology of Wakeup Calls" (PDF). National Aeronautics and Space Administration.
- Lewisohn, Mark (1988). The Beatles Recording Sessions. New York: Harmony Books. ISBN 0-517-57066-1.
- MacDonald, Ian (2005). Revolution in the Head: The Beatles' Records and the Sixties (Second Revised ed.). London: Pimlico (Rand). ISBN 1-84413-828-3.
- Matovina, Dan (2000). Without You: The Tragic Story of Badfinger. Frances Glover Books. ISBN 0-9657122-2-2. "Apple's Neil Aspinall remembers, "(...) Badfinger just popped in my head. It was from an old Lennon thing. He was playing the piano and he had a bad finger so he called the piece he was playing 'Bad Finger Boogie' (which evolved into 'With A Little Help From My Friends')"
- Miles, Barry (1997). Paul McCartney: Many Years From Now. New York City: Henry Holt and Company. ISBN 978-0-8050-5249-7.
- "Original liner notes for Capitol's Beach Boys Rarities album". bradelliott.com. 1983.
- "Ringo Starr – With a Little Help from My Friends". The Daily Show with Jon Stewart. 13 January 2010.
- Kilpatrick, Sean (4 October 2009). "Stephen Harper rocks out". thestar.com. Toronto. Archived from the original on 6 October 2009.
- "UpVenue Top 10 Best Music Covers". UpVenue.com. 2010.
