= Colman Andrews =

American writer and editor

Colman Robert Hardy Andrews (born February 18, 1945) is an American writer and editor on food and wine. He is best known for his association with Saveur magazine, which he founded with Dorothy Kalins, Michael Grossman, and Christopher Hirsheimer in 1994 and where he served as editor-in-chief from 2001 until 2006. After resigning from the magazine in 2006, he became the restaurant columnist for Gourmet. In 2010, he helped launch a food and drink website, The Daily Meal, and served as its editorial director until mid-2018. He is now a senior editor specializing in food and travel for 24/7 Tempo. He is considered one of the world's foremost experts on Spanish cuisine, particularly that of the Catalonia region.

== Biography ==
=== Early life ===
Andrews was born on February 18, 1945, in Santa Monica, California to Charles Robert Hardy Douglas Andrews and Irene Colman (née Bressette). He attended Loyola University – now Loyola Marymount University, leaving and enrolling in Los Angeles City College in 1965. He took a job in the bookshop at the Los Angeles County Museum of Art the same year. In 1968, after a year-and-a-half at Los Angeles City College and a year at California State University at Los Angeles, Andrews was accepted at the University of California at Los Angeles. He graduated in 1969 with degrees in history and philosophy.

=== Career ===
Andrews' first restaurant reviewing job was for The Staff, an offshoot of the Los Angeles Free Press. He began to seriously study wine and the writings of the wine writer Roy Brady. Brady became his mentor in wine matters.

Andrews left Atlantic to become the editor of Coast, a Los Angeles-based lifestyle magazine; he held the position until 1975. In 1975, Lois Dwan, restaurant reviewer for Los Angeles Times, asked Andrews to substitute for her while she went on vacation. This began his association with the newspaper. He contributed pieces to Ampersand's Entertainment Guide from 1977 to the mid-1980s. In 1978, Andrews, was hired as an associate editor at New West magazine, a bi-weekly California publication started by Clay Felker as a parallel to his seminal New York magazine. He was promoted a year later to senior editor. During this time he met Ruth Reichl, then the restaurant columnist for the Northern California edition of New West. For a period the two were lovers, their relationship chronicled in Reichl's memoir Comfort Me with Apples.

Andrews left New West in 1980 and began writing for Apartment Life, an urbane lifestyle magazine which became Metropolitan Home. He was the first American reporter to cover the French chef Guy Savoy. Andrews was also contracted to write a book on Catalan cuisine based on an article he'd written for Met Home. The resulting book, Catalan Cuisine, was published in 1988.

After finishing his Catalan book, Andrews worked as a freelancer, writing articles for the Los Angeles Times and for Bon Appetit, Food & Wine, and Travel & Leisure. In 1992, Andrews published his second book, Everything on the Table: Plain Talk About Food and Wine, a collection of new and revised short pieces, and shortly thereafter he began work on a book about the cuisines of Genoa and Nice, Flavors of the Riviera: Discovering Real Mediterranean Cuisine, published in 1996. Meanwhile, in 1994, Andrews had become a co-founder of Saveur magazine, and in late 1995, he moved from Los Angeles to New York City. The magazine covered recipes and formulas as well as the people and cultures behind the food. During his tenure, Andrews won six James Beard Journalism Awards, and in 2000, Saveur became the first food magazine to win the American Society of Magazine Editors' award for General Excellence. The following year, after the magazine changed ownership, Kalins left to work for Newsweek and Andrews took over as editor-in-chief. He left Saveur in 2006, becoming the restaurant columnist for Gourmet where Reichl was editor-in-chief. He also wrote a series of books.
