= Alana Stewart =

American actress and former model (born 20th century)

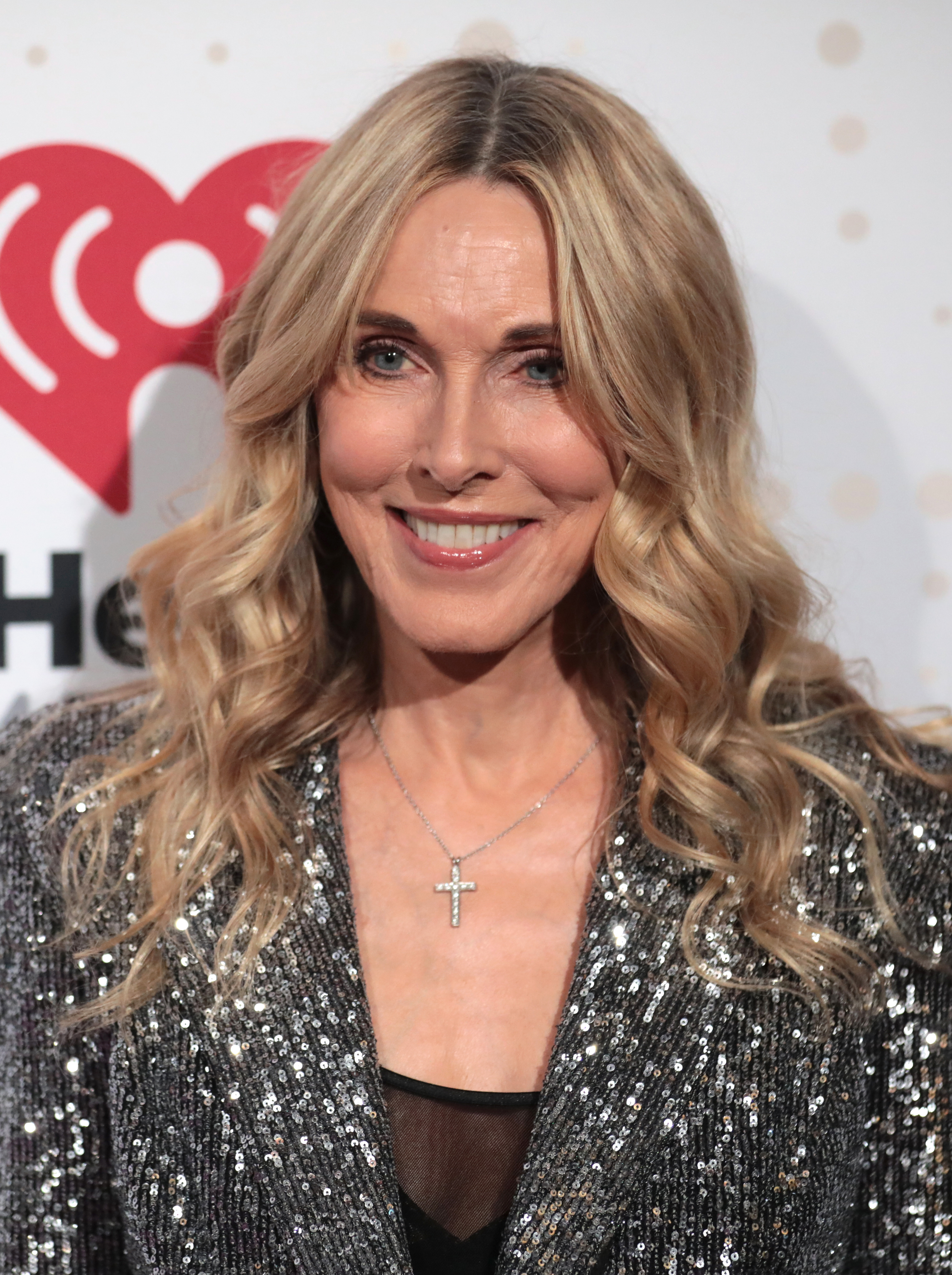
- Stewart in 2023
- Born: Alana Kaye Collins; 20th century San Diego, California, U.S.
- Other names: Alana Collins-Hamilton; Alana Hamilton
- Occupations: Actress, model, writer
- Spouses: George Hamilton (m. 1972; div. 1975) Rod Stewart (m. 1979; div. 1984)
- Children: 3, including Ashley Hamilton and Kimberly Stewart

Alana Hamilton Stewart (/əˈlɑːnə/; née Collins) (born 20th century) is an American actress, model and writer. She has also used her maiden name, Alana Collins, and her names from her first marriage, Alana Collins-Hamilton and Alana Hamilton, professionally.

== Early life and education ==
Born Alana Kaye Collins in San Diego, California, she grew up in Nacogdoches, Texas, and Houston, Texas, before heading to New York to become a model. She said she grew up in poverty. Collins signed with Ford Models and traveled to Los Angeles for many television and commercial appearances.

== Career ==
Stewart began her acting career in the early 1970s. Her first role was a bit part in the 1971 biographical film Evel Knievel, which starred her then-husband, George Hamilton. She later made guest appearances on television shows, including The Bionic Woman, Fantasy Island, Hart to Hart and The Love Boat.

In 1995, she and ex-husband, George Hamilton, hosted their own syndicated talk show, George & Alana. The series was cancelled the following year.

In 2003, Stewart was a contestant in the ABC reality series I'm a Celebrity...Get Me Out of Here!

From 2006 to 2009, Stewart filmed and produced an Emmy Award–nominated, ninety-minute documentary, Farrah's Story, chronicling her friend and fellow model Farrah Fawcett's battle with cancer.

In 2012, she guest-starred in an episode of the Caruso|Portier web series DeVanity as Claudia Muller, the mother of Lara Muller DeVanity and Dr. Portia Muller Roth.

== Personal life ==
Stewart married actor George Hamilton in 1972. They had one child, a son named Ashley Hamilton. The couple divorced in 1975.

In 1979, she married singer Rod Stewart. The couple had two children, Kimberly and Sean. They divorced in 1984, but she retained his surname.

In the early 1990s, Stewart discovered she had the Epstein-Barr virus after suffering from symptoms caused by the virus for two decades. In 1994, she began speaking out about her illness and revealed that she removed her breast implants because she felt they contributed to her illness.

Stewart was a close friend of Farrah Fawcett, who died in 2009 after a long battle with cancer, and as of 2018 she was the president and chief executive officer of the Farrah Fawcett Foundation. Her 2009 New York Times best seller My Journey with Farrah: A Story of Life, Love, and Friendship is dedicated to her journey with Fawcett.

In 2012, she published a book titled Rearview Mirror: A Memoir, detailing her upbringing, her early career as a model, her marriages and subsequent divorces, and the deaths of her mother and Fawcett.

=== Political views ===
In 2014, Stewart, who is a Republican, endorsed her friend, Independent candidate Marianne Williamson, for U.S. Congress in California's 33rd district.

Stewart is a Donald Trump supporter, having voted for him in 2016 and 2020. After Fox News called the 2020 presidential election in Arizona for Joe Biden, she was among the list of conservatives who ceased supporting the news channel and switched to Newsmax.

Stewart opposes restrictions on gun ownership, aside from "stringent background checks". Post-divorce, she has lived alone and keeps her gun on her bedside table.

Stewart was a signatory of the bipartisan letter calling for Walmart to allow sales of the DVD and Blu-ray discs of the 2019 political documentary No Safe Spaces.

== Filmography ==
Film
Year	Title	Role	Notes
1971	Evel Knievel	Nurse #1	
1972	Night Call Nurses	Janis	
1973	Medusa	Eleana	
1975	Funny Lady	Girl with Nick	
1979	Ravagers	Miriam	
1984	Where the Boys Are '84	Maggie	
1984	Swing Shift	Frankie Parker	
1989	Small Sacrifices	Neighbor Woman	
1997	Meet Wally Sparks	Alana Stewart	
1998	Mom, Can I Keep Her?	Eva Blair	direct-to-video
1999	Wasted in Babylon	Lily	
2002	Camel Toe the Movie	Killer	
2002	Naked Movie	The Wife	
2005	Between	Dianne's Mother	
2011	Delivered	Marilyn	
2017	The Fabulous Allan Carr	Herself	documentary
2018	Swiped	Sunny	
Television
Year	Title	Role	Notes
1974–76	Tattletales	Herself	25 episodes
1977	The Love Boat	Mrs. Stanfield	episode: "Julie's Old Flame/The Jinx/The Identical Problem"
1977	The Bionic Woman	Carol	episode: "Over the Hill Spy"
1978	Fantasy Island	Nikki	episode: "Bet a Million/Mr. Irresistible"
1982	Hart to Hart	Claire Austen	episode: "Blue and Broken-Harted"
1984	Masquerade	Christine	episode: "The French Correction"
1985	The Fall Guy	Barbara Hackett	episode: "I Love Paris"
1986	The Love Boat	Miss Enty	episode: "The Art Lover/Couples/Made for Each Other"
1995–96	George & Alana	Herself	180 episodes
2003	I'm a Celebrity...Get Me Out of Here!	Herself	10 episodes (2nd celebrity to leave)
2009	Farrah's Story	Herself	television documentary
2012	DeVanity	Claudia Muller	episode: "Other People's Bodies"
2015	Stewarts & Hamiltons	Herself	8 episodes
