= Lost in Africa =

- Directed by: Stewart Raffill
- Written by: Stewart Raffill
- Produced by: Gerald Green
- Starring: Jennifer McComb; Ashley Hamilton; Timothy Ackroyd; Mohamed Nangurai; Harry Percy
- Cinematography: Roger Olkowski
- Edited by: John Rosenberg
- Music by: Garry Schyman
- Production company: Creative Visions Productions
- Distributed by: Moonstone Entertainment
- Release date: August 3, 1994
- Running time: 100 minutes
- Country: United States
- Language: English

Lost in Africa is a 1994 film directed by Stewart Raffill. It stars Jennifer McComb and Ashley Hamilton.

== Cast ==
- Jennifer McComb as Elizabeth
- Ashley Hamilton as Michael
- Mohamed Nangurai as Rabar
- Timothy Ackroyd as Charles
- J. Jay Saunders as Daryl
- Harry Percy as George
