= Two Fathers' Justice =

- Genre: Drama
- Written by: Brown Meggs
- Directed by: Rod Holcomb
- Starring: Robert Conrad; George Hamilton; Brooke Bundy; Catherine Corkill; Whitney Kershaw; Bo Kaprall; Ted Levine; Dean Hill
- Music by: Jan Hammer
- Country of origin: United States
- Original language: English

Production
- Executive producer: Joan Conrad
- Producer: Robert L. Long
- Cinematography: George Kohut
- Editors: James W. Miller; Robert L. Sinise
- Running time: 120 minutes
- Production company: A. Shane Company

Original release
- Network: NBC
- Release: February 11, 1985

Related
- Two Fathers: Justice for the Innocent

Two Fathers' Justice is a 1985 American made-for-television drama film about two men from different walks of life who have to work together to bring to justice the killers of their children. It stars Robert Conrad and George Hamilton.

== Background ==
Directed by Rod Holcomb and produced by Bob Long, the film was an NBC movie of the week. For actor Richard Kind, this was his first time in film.

== Story ==
A young couple, a girl and guy are about to marry when they are murdered by some drug dealers. Stack (Robert Conrad), the father of the girl, is a tough former steel worker who is from the South Side of Chicago. Bradley (George Hamilton), the father of the boy, is a successful businessman who has his own private jet. Due to the failure of the system to deal with the killers, who avoid justice, these two men from very different backgrounds have to take matters into their own hands.

== Sequel ==
In the sequel Two Fathers: Justice for the Innocent, a hunt takes place some years later when the murderer of their children escapes from prison. Both fathers reunite to find him.
