= That Man George =

- Original theatrical poster
- Directed by: Jacques Deray
- Screenplay by: Jacques Deray; José Giovanni; Henri Lanoë; Suzy Prim
- Based on: The Heisters by Robert Page Jones
- Produced by: Claude Giroux
- Starring: George Hamilton; Claudine Auger
- Cinematography: Henri Raichi
- Music by: Alain Goraguer
- Release date: April 24, 1966
- Running time: 90 minutes
- Country: France
- Language: French

That Man George is a 1966 French crime film starring George Hamilton and Claudine Auger. It was written and directed by Jacques Deray.

It was also known as The Man from Marrakesh.

== Cast ==
- George Hamilton as George
- Claudine Auger as Lila
- Alberto de Mendoza as Travis
- Tiberio Murgia as José
- Daniel Ivernel as Vibert
- Renato Baldini
- Roberto Camardiel
- Giacomo Furia
- George Rigaud

== See also ==
- List of French films of 1966
