= Two Fathers: Justice for the Innocent =

- Genre: Crime drama
- Based on: Characters by Brown Meggs
- Written by: Stephen Zito
- Directed by: Paul Krasny
- Starring: Robert Conrad; George Hamilton
- Music by: Robert Folk
- Country of origin: United States
- Original language: English

Production
- Executive producer: Joan Conrad
- Producer: Shane Conrad
- Cinematography: Robert A. Hudecek
- Editors: John Barton; Paul Krasny
- Running time: 91 minutes
- Production companies: A. Shane Productions; Black Sheep Productions; RHI Entertainment

Original release
- Network: NBC
- Release: January 14, 1994

Related
- Two Fathers' Justice (1985)

Two Fathers: Justice for the Innocent is a 1994 American television crime drama film directed by Paul Krasny and written by Stephen Zito. The film is a sequel to the 1985 television film Two Fathers' Justice, and stars Robert Conrad and George Hamilton, who reprise their roles from the first film. It aired on NBC on January 14, 1994.

== Background ==
The film was written by Stephen Zito and directed by Paul Krasny. It is a sequel to the first film that was released in 1985. Part of the film was shot in the streets where Robert Conrad grew up.

== Plot ==
Both Robert Conrad and George Hamilton reprise the roles they played in Two Fathers' Justice. The story involves the return of two men who are from very different backgrounds. One very working class and the other an upper-class businessman. They are the fathers of a young engaged couple who were murdered by drug dealers. The justice system failed them. Years later one of the killers escapes from prison and is on the run with a former Mafia accountant. The two men (parents of the murder victims) reunite to track the killer down. However in the eight years since the murder Stack's wife has died from cancer and he is now working as a night watchman; Bradley wife has become an alcoholic and he has to convince Stack to help him.
