= Whitney Kershaw =

American singer and actress (born 1962)

- Born: Whitney Wiemer; April 10, 1962 (age 64); Orlando, Florida, U.S.
- Occupation: Actress/Singer
- Years active: 1983–1994

Whitney Kershaw (born April 10, 1962) is an American retired singer and actress, best known for her roles on television. Her most well known role was that of Merilee Gunderson during the first season of Major Dad in 1989 and 1990.

Kershaw originated the role of Sillabub in the Broadway production of Cats.

Additional television credits include Something Wilder, The Wonder Years, Valerie, Jake and the Fatman, Longarm, Simon & Simon, L.A. Law, Hunter, Quicksilver, A Letter to Three Wives, Alfred Hitchcock Presents, HeartBeat, Covenant, Two Fathers' Justice and Knots Landing and for singing the closing theme song for Big Blue Marble, a mid-1970s syndicated children's TV program produced by her father, Robert Wiemer.

She is married to Glenn Kershaw and her eldest daughter Lily is a singer-songwriter based in Los Angeles.
