= KRLA Beat =

American music magazine

- Cover of the 16 July 1966 issue, depicting the Beatles
- Categories: Music magazine
- Publisher: Cecil Tuck
- First issue: October 7, 1964
- Final issue: May 4, 1968
- Company: Beat Publications
- Based in: Los Angeles, U.S.

KRLA Beat was an American rock music magazine that operated between 1964 and 1968. It began in October 1964 as a free newsletter distributed by the Southern Californian radio station KRLA, before being reworked as a more reportage-focused title in February 1965. The music journalism archive Rock's Backpages describes KRLA Beat as "the first American newspaper dedicated to coverage of the top-forty rock-and-roll music scene".

== The British Invasion ==
The magazine was noted for its coverage of British Invasion groups, particularly the Beatles, but also the Rolling Stones, the Kinks and Herman's Hermits. Its access to the Beatles was facilitated by direct contributions from the band's press officer, Tony Barrow. The magazine was also granted exclusive access to the Rolling Stones during their recording sessions in Los Angeles, after the group had become enamoured with RCA Studios in Hollywood.

Whilst acknowledging the cooperation that existed between the magazine and its subjects, KRLA Beat's online history states that "In the hands of Beat writers, many articles remained mostly unaffected by tabloid-style gossip, occasionally reporting negatively about favorite bands of the day." Author Robert Rodriguez describes the editorial approach as "refreshingly honest in its reporting".

== Production and contributors ==
KRLA Beat was published by Cecil Tuck, who had worked for newspapers in Texas before being appointed news director at KRLA. According to the magazine's website, the early, newsletter version of the title ran for 20 issues, published weekly from October 1964 onward. The newsletter was solely the work of Bonnie Golden, formerly an editor at Teen Screen magazine, and distributed free to newsstands, record stores, and the station's listeners.

Following Tuck's relaunching of the title, with an issue dated February 25, 1965, its staff writers included Carol Deck, Louise Criscione, Mike Tuck, Rochelle Reed, and "Eden". The last of these was a pseudonym for Nikki Wine, who went on to produce Casey Kasem's radio show American Top 40. KRLA DJs Dave Hull and Tony Leigh were also credited as contributors, through the publication of their on-air interviews, as was former Beatles publicist Derek Taylor, who briefly hosted a radio show of his own.

Writing in his online "Chart Beat Chat" for Billboard in September 2004, Fred Bronson recalled that he wrote for KRLA Beat as a sixteen-year-old in the mid-1960s. By 1968, the magazine included articles by Jacoba Atlas – later a contributor to Circus, Melody Maker, Los Angeles Free Press and Rolling Stone and to film publications such as Show and Film Comment.

== New direction under Derek Taylor ==
After leaving the Beatles' employ and establishing himself as a successful publicist in California, Taylor became editor of KRLA Beat in 1967. That year, he helped organize the Monterey Pop Festival. Having championed American acts such as the Byrds and the Beach Boys since 1965, he subsequently guided the magazine's direction toward countercultural issues and psychedelia.

In 1968, editorial disagreements between Taylor and Tuck, together with the latter's concerns about increased expenditure on the magazine, forced Taylor's departure. KRLA Beat continued until May 1968. Tuck was forced to shut down the publication due to its precarious financial position.
