= Measure of a Man (Sam and Mark song) =

2004 song by Sam & Mark

Song by Sam & Mark
- A-side: "With a Little Help from My Friends"
- Released: 9 February 2004
- Genre: Pop; pop rock
- Length: 4:00
- Label: 19
- Songwriter(s): Cathy Dennis
- Producer(s): Stephen Lipson

"Measure of a Man" is a song written by Cathy Dennis, produced by Stephen Lipson and recorded by Pop Idol contestants Sam Nixon and Mark Rhodes, collectively known as Sam & Mark, in 2003. It was released as the B-side of the "With a Little Help from My Friends" single on 9 February 2004. The song was also recorded by American Idol runner-up Clay Aiken in the same year for his first solo album of the same name. Aiken's album made it to number one on the Billboard 200.

== Track listing ==
1. "With a Little Help from My Friends" – 3:08
2. "Measure of a Man" – 4:00
3. "With a Little Help from My Friends" (music video)

== Clay Aiken version ==
Clay Aiken released the track on his debut album five months after the conclusion of second season of American Idol. The album of the same name debuted at number one on the Billboard 200. It sold 613,000 copies in its first week. It was number one on the Billboard 200 for two consecutive weeks and received a Multi-Platinum certification 17 November 2003.
