= Judith Sims =

American journalist, music critic and magazine editor

Paul McCartney being interviewed by Sims on March 29, 1967, in London, between recording sessions for "With a Little Help from My Friends".

Judith Sims (c. 1939 – March 25, 1996) was an American journalist, music critic, and magazine editor. She was the editor of the rock magazine TeenSet in the 1960s. Later she was the Los Angeles bureau chief for Rolling Stone.

== Career ==
Judith Sims was the editor of the rock magazine TeenSet during 1965–1969, writing many influential pieces considering groups such as the Beatles, Buffalo Springfield, the Doors and more. During her tenure with TeenSet she toured with the Beatles, covered multiple music scenes, rubbed elbows with Derek Taylor, and considered issues of cultural and race within TeenSet. After TeenSet/AUM she worked publicity for Warner Bros. Records from 1969 to 1972. She contributed to the UK Melody Maker and Disc and Music Echo in the 1970s, and she was the Los Angeles bureau chief for Rolling Stone. She edited the college supplement Ampersand and the film review publication The Movie Magazine. She wrote pieces for the Los Angeles Times, the Los Angeles magazine, and The Washington Post.

Sims strongly advocated copyright protection for writers. She was the president of the Los Angeles chapter of the National Writers Union.

Rolling Stone editor Ben Fong-Torres eulogized her, saying that she had taken TeenSet above the field of teen magazines to become "one of the first publications to reflect the social and musical changes of those times". He remembered how she and he "were partners on every level", flying back and forth between San Francisco and Los Angeles in the early 1970s, until June 1972 when she met her soon-to-be husband. Fong-Torres said that Sims gave him an early journalism platform at TeenSet along with music/film critic Jacoba Atlas (later a television executive producer) and rock journalist Jerry Hopkins. Music critic David Wagner, writing in 1968, agreed that Sims was "an intelligent, clear-eyed interpreter" of the music scene, improving TeenSet until it was the best teen magazine. She is a focus of the book entitled "TeenSet, Teen Fan Magazines, and Rock Journalism: Don't Let the Name Fool You" through the University of Mississippi Press, by Allison Bumsted.

== Personal life ==
Sims lived with her husband in Echo Park, Los Angeles, for two decades, then moved with him to Oregon in the early 1990s. She died of cancer in 1996 in Roseburg, Oregon, at the age of 56.
