= George & Alana =

- Also known as: The George & Alana Show; G&A
- Genre: Talk show
- Presented by: George Hamilton; Alana Stewart
- Country of origin: United States
- Original language: English
- No. of seasons: 1

Production
- Production location: Los Angeles, California
- Camera setup: Multiple
- Running time: 40 minutes
- Production companies: Rysher Productions; George Hamilton Productions; Lighthearted Entertainment

Original release
- Network: Syndicated
- Release: September 18, 1995 – March 29, 1996

George & Alana (also called The George & Alana Show or G&A) is an American daytime talk show that aired in broadcast syndication from September 18, 1995, to March 29, 1996, and was hosted by actor George Hamilton and his former wife Alana Stewart. Repeats continued until early September 1996 for the show's affiliates.

The series was similar in structure to Live with Regis & Kathie Lee and was one of many of a line of shows which failed to topple that series in late-morning syndication. The show was produced and distributed by Rysher Entertainment (now CBS Media Ventures).
