= Ed Cray =

American journalist, biographer, and educator (1933–2019)

- Born: Edward Beryl Cray; June 3, 1933; Cleveland, Ohio, U.S.
- Died: October 8, 2019 (aged 86); Palo Alto, California, U.S.
- Resting place
- Occupations: Journalist; biographer; educator

Edward Beryl Cray (July 3, 1933 – October 8, 2019) was an American journalist, biographer and educator. Cray was best known for his biographies of Woody Guthrie and Earl Warren.

== Bibliography ==
- Cray, Ed (1992) [1968]. The Erotic Muse: American Bawdy Songs (2nd ed.). University of Illinois Press. ISBN 0-252-01781-1.
- Cray, Ed (1997). Chief Justice: A Biography of Earl Warren. Simon & Schuster. ISBN 0-684-80852-8.
- Cray, Ed (2006). Ramblin' Man: The Life and Times of Woody Guthrie. W. W. Norton & Company. ISBN 0-393-04759-8.
