= Sue Cameron =

British journalist and columnist

Sue Cameron is a British journalist and columnist. Cameron wrote primarily for The Daily Telegraph, particularly about the UK Government's relationship with the Civil Service, and is a former presenter of Newsnight, Channel Four News and the ITN Parliament Programme.
