= Ashley Hamilton =

American actor

- Born: Ashley George Hamilton; September 30, 1974 (age 52); Los Angeles, California, U.S.
- Occupations: Actor; musician; comedian
- Years active: 1993–present
- Spouses: Shannen Doherty (m. 1993; div. 1994) Angie Everhart (m. 1996; div. 1997)
- Children: 1
- Parents: George Hamilton (father); Alana Collins (mother)
- Relatives: George Hamilton (paternal grandfather); Kimberly Stewart (half-sister)

Ashley George Hamilton (born September 30, 1974) is an American actor who made his debut in the 1993 film Beethoven's 2nd, and has since starred in films such as Lost in Africa (1994), Off Key (2001), Lost Angeles (2012), Iron Man 3 (2013), and Cats Dancing on Jupiter (2015). He portrayed the role of Cole Deschanel for a short period in the first season of the NBC television series Sunset Beach (1997).

== Early life ==
Hamilton was born in Los Angeles, the son of actors George Hamilton and Alana Collins. He is the former stepson of musician Rod Stewart.

== Career ==
In 1993, Hamilton appeared on Saturday Night Live, and starred in the film Beethoven's 2nd. In 1997, he briefly starred in the television series Sunset Beach as Cole Deschanel, but was let go only a month after the premiere.

In addition to his acting career, Hamilton is a singer and songwriter. He fronted the Los Angeles–based rock band Fine. In 1999 the group released their only album to date, Against the View. In June 2003, Hamilton released a single entitled "Wimmin'", which reached No. 27 in the UK Singles Chart. The song was co-written by British singer Robbie Williams, who also provided some of the vocals on the track. Hamilton co-wrote Williams' 2003 single "Come Undone". Hamilton also claims that he co-wrote Williams' single "She's Madonna" in 2006, but that Williams omitted his name from publishing.

It was announced on August 17, 2009, he would be competing in season 9 of Dancing with the Stars. He was eliminated first on September 23, 2009. Following Dancing with the Stars, Hamilton joined the entertainment news program Extra as a field correspondent.

Since 2007, Hamilton has been performing stand-up comedy at the Hollywood Improv, The Comedy Store, and Room 5 in Los Angeles. In 2013, he appeared as the character Jack Taggert in the Marvel superhero film Iron Man 3. Hamilton also recorded the cover of Sly Fox's "Let's Go All the Way" along with supergroup The Wondergirls and Robbie Williams for Iron Man 3.

In 2019, Hamilton directed and starred in the erotic horror film Gothic Harvest.

== Personal life ==
At 19, Hamilton garnered media attention when he and Shannen Doherty married after knowing one another for two weeks. The marriage lasted five months before the couple divorced. He was then married to actress Angie Everhart for four months, from December 1996 until their divorce in March 1997.

In November 2025, on the podcast Punk Rock Sober, Hamilton revealed he’d been battling a mucosal HPV-related cancer. In March 2026, he continued to speak about his illness and recovery from a drug addiction in an interview on the YouTube channel Soft White Underbelly. In April 2026, Hamilton was rushed to hospital after suffering an overdose.

== Filmography ==
Film and television
| Year | Title | Role | Notes |
|---|---|---|---|
| 1993 | Beethoven's 2nd | Taylor Devereaux | |
| 1994 | Lost in Africa | Michael | |
| 1997 | Sunset Beach | Cole Deschanel | 14 episodes |
| 1998 | Not Even the Trees | Unknown | |
| 2001 | Off Key | Maurice | |
| 2001 | Sluts & Losers | Ben | |
| 2002 | Never Get Outta the Boat | Joe the Drummer | |
| 2003 | Oz | Stanley Bukowski | Episode: "Junkyard Dawgs" |
| 2006 | Dreamweaver | Weaver | Television film |
| 2006 | Voodoo Lagoon | Tom | |
| 2008 | Sunday School Musical | Background Person | |
| 2009 | Cruel and Unusual | Iverson | Short film |
| 2010 | P Lo's House | Ashley | Television film |
| 2012 | Femme Fatales | Devlin Grant | Episode: "Family Business" |
| 2012 | Lost Angeles | Bruce | |
| 2013 | Iron Man 3 | Jack Taggert | |
| 2014 | Phantom Halo | Donny | |
| 2014 | Implant | Bell | Short film |
| 2015 | Cats Dancing on Jupiter | Kurt | |
| 2016 | Rules Don't Apply | Rudolf | |
| 2019 | Gothic Harvest | Gar | |
| 2022 | Sleep No More | Donny | |

== Discography ==
=== With Fine ===
Studio albums

- Against the View (1999)

Singles

- "Wrecking Ball" (1999)

=== Solo ===
Singles

- "Wimmin" (2003), No. 27 UK Singles Chart
