= Jean Benedetti =

- Born: December 30, 1930
- Died: March 27, 2012 (aged 81)

Jean Benedetti (1930–2012) was an actor and playwright best known for his studies of Konstantin Stanislavski.

== Selected works ==
Books

- Gilles de Rais biography (1972)
- Stanislavski: An Introduction (1982)
- Stanislavski: A Biography (1989)
- Stanislavski and The Actor (1998)
- Garrick and the Birth of Modern Theatre (2001)

Plays

- The Good Shoemaker and the Poor Fish Peddler (1965)
