= TeenSet =

Music magazine for teens

- June 1968 cover featuring Jim Morrison
- Editor: Judith Sims
- Categories: Music, celebrity, teen, young adult
- Frequency: monthly
- Circulation: 500,000
- Publisher: Capitol Records
- First issue: October 1964
- Final issue: July 1969
- Country: United States
- Based in: Los Angeles

TeenSet (originally The Teen Set) was an American music and fan magazine published by Capitol Records. Beginning in 1964 as a free album insert for fans of the Beach Boys, the magazine was sold separately in 1965 and it grew in popularity. It was introduced as a vehicle to promote the Beach Boys and other Capitol artists, but in the hands of editor Judith Sims, the magazine broke new ground, rising above its fan club origin. Quickly establishing itself as the gateway to the inner circle of the Beatles at the height of Beatlemania, TeenSet parlayed this trust to introduce their readers to new artists, in the process greatly increasing the visibility of Buffalo Springfield, the Doors, Janis Joplin and the Mothers of Invention. The magazine benefited from articles by music critic Sue Cameron, London correspondent Carol Gold, psychedelic maverick Robert Shea (writing under pseudonyms), and photographs from Jim Marshall and Michael Ochs. It began as an early teen girls' magazine but by 1968 was shifting to focus on late teen girls and young women in their early twenties.

== History ==
=== 1964–65 ===
In March 1964, the Beach Boys released the album Shut Down Volume 2 which came with an inner sleeve announcing the invitation, "Join the Teen Set on Capitol." The inner sleeve gave instructions for joining the Teen Set fan club, based in Hollywood, California. It promised "Details in the next great issue of the Teen Set magazine." The first magazine issue of the Teen Set was ready in October 1964, released as a free insert to the live album Beach Boys Concert. The magazine informed the reader about various aspects of the Beach Boys. None of the articles listed an author. The magazine's chief editor was Brown Meggs, the Capitol executive who had signed the Beatles. Veteran teen magazine journalist and photographer Earl Leaf was hired as guest editor.

The second issue was ready in March 1965, printed in a massive run of 500,000, produced by Lou Kimzey and his Kimtex Corporation. The label told Billboard magazine that it was "the largest teen-oriented advertising-merchandising campaign in the history of CRDC [Capitol Records Distribution Company]." The first 350,000 copies of the magazine were given free with the purchase of a specified teen-oriented Capitol album, including the recent February releases of the Lettermen's Portrait of My Love, and an album by the easy listening Hollyridge Strings (playing orchestral versions of Beatles songs), as well as the March releases of Dick Dale's Live at Ciro's, Bobby Rydell's Somebody Loves You, and The Beach Boys Today! The remaining magazine copies were sold at newsstands for 35¢, and they were popular enough for Capitol to move forward with a quarterly publishing schedule. Capitol later reported that they had sold 90,000 of the 150,000 copies set aside for newsstand sales. Artists profiled in the Teen Set volume 2 were Donna Loren, Bobby Rydell, Peter & Gordon and, of course, the Beach Boys. In August 1965, Kimzey told Billboard that he was editor, replacing the Capitol staff.

The third and fourth issues were published in runs of 175,000 each by Kimtex. Some non-Capitol artists were included. Featured artists in November 1965 included UK acts such as the Beatles, singer Ian Whitcomb, actor/oboist David McCallum and the Rolling Stones, showing that the British Invasion would be sustained by Capitol through TeenSet. Twenty-five-year-old Judith Sims started as editor to produce the November issue, under publisher Robert Bates of Capitol. The magazine geared up for a change from quarterly to monthly publication in 1966.

=== 1966–67 ===
Monthly production began with the February 1966 issue which featured the Beach Boys, the Beatles, Bob Dylan, Sonny & Cher, Herman's Hermits, and an interview with early Beatle drummer Pete Best. The upcoming Elvis Presley film Paradise, Hawaiian Style was teased with photographs taken on location. The price was 35 cents for one issue, or $3 for a yearly subscription, bringing the per-issue price down to 25¢.

Sue Cameron introduced the Mothers of Invention and Buffalo Springfield to TeenSet in the November 1966 issue, an article titled "Hollywood Group Scene" that also included the Association pop-folk group, and the Everpresent Fullness, a band that saw brief success with Warren Zevon's adaptation of the old Jim Jackson blues song "Wild About My Lovin'". Michael Vosse kept up interest in Zappa by featuring him in an article published in January 1967.

In December 1966, TeenSet published "On Tour with the Beatles", showing Sims in close contact with the Beatles as they toured the US. (This turned out to be their final tour.) Sims wrote exciting concert experiences and the daily routine of touring, sharing inside glimpses of the band. Sims later remembered that her position as editor of Capitol's own magazine TeenSet helped her get close to the Beatles who published in the US through Capitol, but she also noted that the major media was uninterested in covering the Beatles' US tour. No reporters had been assigned from Time magazine or Newsweek, so it was just herself, a few other teen magazine editors, and some radio deejays. She wrote that she did not eat with the Beatles "nor, alas, sleep with them." Billboard reported that the radio entourage of the Beatles' US tour was composed of deejays Jerry Leighton, Kenny Everett, Jim Stagg, Jerry Ghan, George Klein, Tim Hudson and a few others. The print media was represented by Sims of TeenSet, Bess Coleman of Teen Life, Marilyn Doerfler of Hearst newspapers, and Arthur Unger of progressive teen magazine Datebook who had recently sparked the "more popular than Jesus" controversy.

In January 1967, Sims apologized to her readers about previously being complicit in hiding the married status of the Beach Boys. The catalyst was a recent announcement by Brian Wilson that all five Beach Boys were married, revealing the mild deception of magazines purposely failing to state that musical artists were married, in order to sustain fan interest.

In November 1966, Buffalo Springfield first played their song "For What It's Worth (Stop, Hey What's That Sound)" at the Whisky a Go Go. Sims heard the song and immediately took a liking to the band, determining to include something about them in every issue. The song played on Los Angeles radio at the end of 1966, then started climbing the charts in early 1967. TeenSet was invaluable in helping to keep the band in the public eye during 1967–1968, featuring the band in a layout published in January 1967. Sims later said, "They just knocked me out. It was obvious they loved playing with each other and respected each other's musicianship. They were a joy to behold."

TeenSet picked up American expatriate Carol Gold as the magazine's London correspondent. Gold caught up with the Jimi Hendrix Experience in April 1967 in London, with the interview published in August.

When Beatles' manager Brian Epstein died in August, Marilyn Doerfler wrote a remembrance of him, published in the December 1967 issue of TeenSet. Doerfler had previously written in July about a poorly conducted publicity appearance by the Monkees, and she had accompanied Sims on the Beatles final tour.

==== WCFL sponsorship ====
In mid-1967, Chicago radio station WCFL sponsored a series of TeenSet issues in the Chicago area, adding their call letters to the top of the magazine as sold in Chicago. The "WCFL Presents" version of TeenSet carried four additional pages of local Chicago music events and advertisements, aimed at the station's fan base. WCFL disc jockey Jim Stagg had previously covered the Beatles final US tour with Sims.

=== 1968–69 ===
In January 1968, TeenSet included "giant wall size" posters of Ringo Starr and Micky Dolenz, and the price had risen to 50¢ per issue. Carol Gold reported on the UK filming of Magical Mystery Tour film which she had watched in September 1967. The magazine was shifting its aim to reach older high school girls and young women in college. Gold's interview of the Bee Gees was published in February.

Around April 1968, Sims interviewed Morrison again at Olivia's in Venice, the restaurant that inspired the Doors' song "Soul Kitchen". Morrison ate liver and onions while describing the recording process of Waiting for the Sun. Published in June, the cover photo showing Morrison later made this edition a collector's item.

Writer Jerry Hopkins interviewed Frank Zappa and the Mothers of Invention, and published stories about them in Rolling Stone and TeenSet. His September 1968 article in TeenSet, "That's Funny, You Don't Look Like The Musician Of The Year", talked about how the group was known for their onstage antics, or "atrocities". Hated by some of their audiences, Hopkins joked that the group was "both hailed and stoned", implying the audience was praising and stoning (throwing rocks at) them. The next month, TeenSet included a foldout poster of Zappa, a psychedelic rendering of multiple exposures.

in 1968, Jacoba Atlas interviewed Jimi Hendrix in Benedict Canyon, providing enough material for a two-part article. The second half of the interview discussed Hendrix's political views including his thoughts about the Black Panther Party and the Black Power movement; it appeared in the January 1969 issue made controversial because the cover showed white singer Grace Slick in blackface giving the Black power salute.

TeenSet sponsored the magazine's "first annual" (only) ice skating Christmas party in late 1968, held at Topanga Plaza Ice Capades Chalet. With three Canadians in the band, Buffalo Springfield appeared very expert and relaxed on the ice compared to Hearts & Flowers and the Merry-Go-Round.

In March 1969, TeenSet published with a question mark next to the magazine name (TeenSet?), which turned out to be the final issue. The cover showed two dolls with pasted-on heads: a naked black G.I. Joe with Jimi Hendrix's head, and a naked Barbie with Mia Farrow's head. This issue hosted an article by Robert Shea writing as "Sandra Glass", illustrated with glossy magazine cut-out collage figures appearing as puppets controlled by strings. An editor's note said that "Miss Glass" had had a recent "fatal accident". The article contained a reference to April Fools' Day, and jokingly concocted a worldwide "Illuminati" conspiracy involving such disparate elements as Nelson Rockefeller, Raquel Welch, Mao Tse-tung, Thuggee Society and Saint Yossarian. Shea also wrote "Morality Is Not Good for You" in the same issue, under the name "Alexander Eulenspiegel". Sims listed this two-page article in the table of contents as "The New Morality. It may be just the absence of the old morality."

In May 1969 the magazine was published with a new name, AUM, an initialism for Adult Underthirty Magazine, also referring to the Hindu meditation word Om. The cover photograph by Ed Caraeff showed four of the GTOs including Pamela Des Barres, each holding a different past issue of TeenSet. The editorial by Sims said the magazine's new title was pronounced "awm". Continuing with the magazine were writers Jacoba Atlas, Jerry Hopkins, "Alexander Eulenspiegel" (Robert Shea) and more. The July issue of AUM was the magazine's final appearance, featuring a cover painting titled "Aquarius Theatre" by the Fool, a Dutch artist duo. Hopkins reported in August that the magazine had been axed by Capitol because of poor sales.

== Legacy ==
After TeenSet and AUM shut down, many of the writers went to Rolling Stone, including editor Sims who was hired as the Los Angeles bureau chief. In 2014, the magazine Flashback published a retrospective titled "TeenSet: The story behind this pioneering 1960s American rock magazine." From 2018 to 2021, TeenSet has been explored by Dr Allison Bumsted in her PhD thesis considering multiple aspects of TeenSet magazine and popular music journalism at Liverpool Hope University. Bumsted looks at 'TeenSet from a new perspective and reconsiders its role in our popular music journalism history.' Although Bumsted published a brief biography of Sims on Rocksbackpages.com, and her book TeenSet, Teen Fan Magazines, and Rock Journalism: Don't Let the Name Fool You will be published by the University of Mississippi Press October 2024.
