= George Hamilton (actor) =

American actor (born 1939)

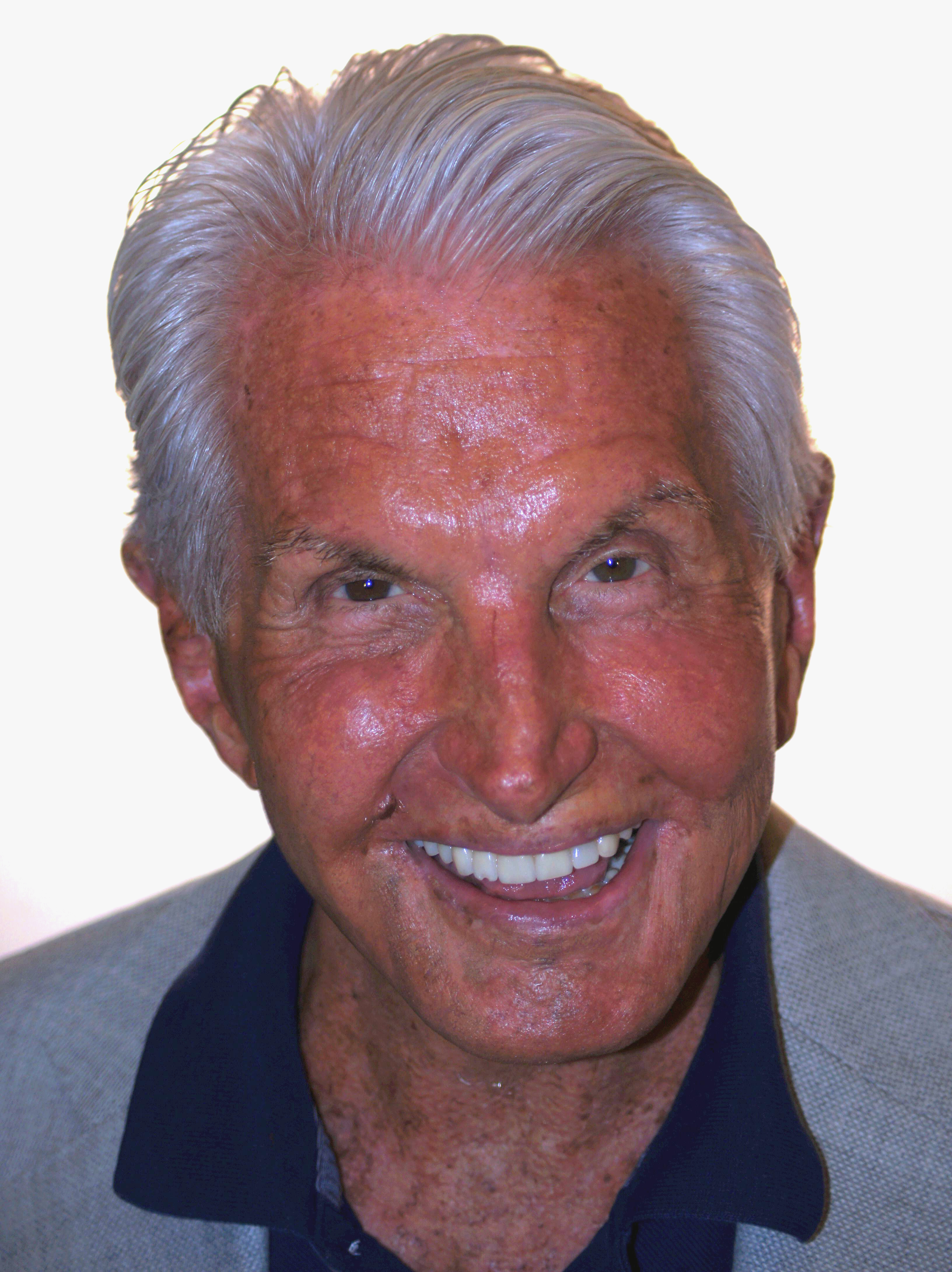
- Hamilton in 2023
- Born: George Stevens Hamilton; August 12, 1939 (age 87); Memphis, Tennessee, U.S.
- Occupation: Actor
- Years active: 1952–present
- Spouse: Alana Stewart (m. 1972; div. 1975)
- Children: 2, including Ashley Hamilton
- Parent: George Hamilton

George Stevens Hamilton (born August 12, 1939) is an American actor.

For his debut performance in Crime and Punishment U.S.A. (1959), Hamilton won a Golden Globe Award and was nominated for a BAFTA Award. He has received one additional BAFTA nomination and two Golden Globe nominations. His early career was dominated by dramatic and leading man roles often based on his good looks and debonair style, while later film roles emphasizing more comedic roles and self-depreciating humor. Additionally, Hamilton was a longtime commercial spokesman for Ritz Crackers. According to Filmink "he managed to survive an incredible amount of flops to not only forge an entirely decent career of sixty plus years, but also evolved into a very good actor."

Hamilton is known for his deeply tanned appearance, with Bo Derek joking about a competition between Hamilton and her late husband John Derek "as to who had the most tan!"

== Early life ==
Hamilton was born in Memphis, Tennessee, and spent his early years with his mother, Ann (née Stevens), in Blytheville, Arkansas. He attended Hawthorne School in Beverly Hills, California. In 1950, his mother sent him to live with his father in the north. He briefly attended a progressive school in New York City before being sent to the Gulf Coast Military Academy in Gulfport, Mississippi.

Hamilton's stepfathers were Carleton Hunt and Jesse Spalding; his stepmother was June Howard, with whom Hamilton said he had repeated sexual relations when he was 12, shortly after she married his father, and again when he was an adult.

== Career ==
=== Early appearances ===
Hamilton's first roles were in television, appearing in shows such as The Veil (playing an Indian), The Adventures of Rin Tin Tin, The Donna Reed Show, and Cimarron City. His first film role was a lead, Crime and Punishment U.S.A. (1959), directed by Denis Sanders. Hamilton signed a five year contract with Denis and Terry Sanders' TD Productions.

=== MGM ===
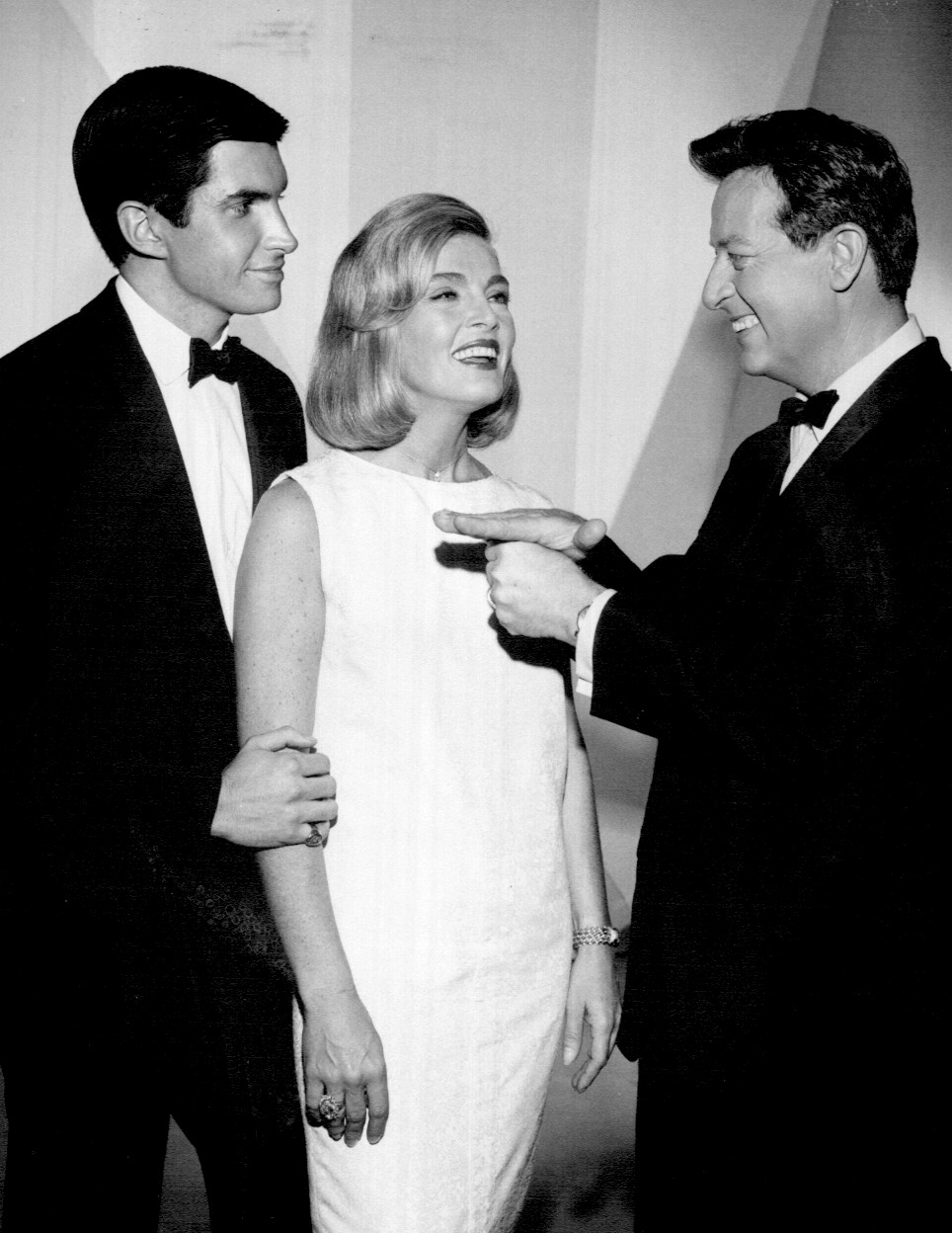
Hamilton (left) with Lizabeth Scott and host Mike Stokey on Stump the Stars, 1963.

Hamilton's work on Crime and Punishment was seen by MGM who cast him in Home from the Hill (1960) and put the actor under contract. He was considered for roles in The Time Machine, Cimarron, Mutiny on the Bounty and Four Horsemen of the Apocalypse. MGM cast Hamilton in support of Natalie Wood and Robert Wagner in the melodrama All the Fine Young Cannibals (1960) and the beach party comedy Where the Boys Are (1960). Hamilton appeared in the lower budgeted Angel Baby (1961), a drama about an evangelist, for Allied Artists, who had to borrow Hamilton from TD Productions. It had minimal commercial or critical impact. The movie was the feature debut of Burt Reynolds, who recalled "George was different. When I came to Hollywood, there were 175 Marlon Brandos, 2,000 Jimmy Deans, and a lot of Carroll Bakers. But nobody wanted to be David Niven, except George." Reynolds later said, "if anybody could have gotten him to be" as "relaxed and self-deprecating on film" as he was in real life "he would have been the next Cary Grant."

For United Artists, Hamilton supported Lana Turner in the melodrama By Love Possessed (1961). MGM tried to change his image by putting him in the Western A Thunder of Drums (1961). In 1961 Hamilton brought suit against TD Productions but eventually settled out of court saying he would pay them $10,000 per picture for the next seven pictures in five years, exclusive of the ones he made for MGM. Hamilton's contract with TD Productions went to his own company, Ash Productions.

Hamilton lobbied hard for the role of the Italian husband in Light in the Piazza (1962), with Olivia de Havilland. The film lost money, but Hamilton received excellent notices. It was shot in Italy, and MGM kept Hamilton in Italy to play a role in Two Weeks in Another Town (1962). Hamilton had a part in The Victors (1963), an anti-war drama from Carl Foreman. His performance was described as "excellent". Hamilton played Moss Hart in Act One (1963),

After making a cameo in Looking for Love (1964), Hamilton appeared in Your Cheatin' Heart (1964), playing Hank Williams. He went to Mexico for Viva Maria! (1965). It was directed by Louis Malle, who cast Hamilton on the strength of his performance in Two Weeks in Another Town. Malle said, "he was a personal choice and I am happy with him...He's more interested in being in the social columns—I don't understand—when he should be one of the greatest of his generation".

Hamilton made That Man George (1965), and appeared in a production of A Farewell to Arms (1966) on TV. He returned to MGM to make Doctor, You've Got to Be Kidding! (1967), a romantic comedy with Sandra Dee, which was mildly popular. At Columbia, he co-starred with Glenn Ford in A Time for Killing (1967).

Hamilton played a cat burglar in MGM's Jack of Diamonds (1967). It was produced by Sandy Howard, who said Hamilton was "a hot commodity these days" because he was dating Lyndon Johnson's daughter. Reports put his fee around this time at $100,000 per movie. He was drafted into the Army but received a 3-A deferral notice on the grounds that he was his mother's sole financial provider. The deferral was highly controversial because it was thought that his relationship with the president's daughter gave him preferential treatment. In 1968, Hamilton made The Power.

=== Television ===
Hamilton went into television in 1969, supporting Lana Turner in the all-star series Harold Robbins' The Survivors (1969–70). When the show was canceled in January 1970, Hamilton went into Paris 7000 (1970). He portrayed a troubleshooter for the U.S. State Department in Paris. This series was canceled in March 1970. He starred in the TV films Togetherness (1970) and The Last of the Powerseekers, a 1971 compilation of two episodes of Robbins' The Survivors.

=== Producer ===
Hamilton moved into producing to give himself greater control over his career. He produced and played the title role in Evel Knievel (1971). Hamilton had the script rewritten by John Milius, and the latter called Hamilton "a wonderful guy, totally underrated. A great con-man, that's what he really is. He always said 'I'll be remembered as a third-rate actor when in fact, I'm a first-rate con man.'" Filmink argued the picture "showed that Hamilton could carry the movie if given a big, broad character to play."

He had a supporting role in The Man Who Loved Cat Dancing, starring Burt Reynolds (1973). He produced and appeared in Medusa (1973). He starred in the TV movie The Dead Don't Die (1975) and had a supporting role in Once Is Not Enough (1975).

On a 1975 episode of Columbo, Hamilton played a psychiatrist who uses hypnosis to commit a murder, whose arrogant assertions in his own defense establish that he was in fact at the scene of the crime. Hamilton also guest-starred on episodes of Police Story, McCloud, Roots, The Eddie Capra Mysteries, Gibbsville, Supertrain, and Sword of Justice.

He had supporting roles in The Strange Possession of Mrs. Oliver (1977), The Happy Hooker Goes to Washington (1977), Killer on Board (1977), Sextette (1978), The Users (1978), From Hell to Victory (1979), Institute for Revenge (1979), and Death Car on the Freeway (1979).

=== Love at First Bite ===
In 1979, he appeared in the surprise hit Love at First Bite, in which he showed a flair for comedy; it was the story of Count Dracula's pursuit of a young Manhattanite model, played by Susan Saint James. The film included scenes with Dracula and his conquest as they dance to "I Love the Nightlife" at a disco. The film's box-office success created a popularity surge for Hamilton, who also served as executive producer.

He returned to TV for The Seekers (1979) and The Great Cash Giveaway Getaway (1979), then did 1981's Zorro, The Gay Blade, which he produced. Zorro was not as popular as Love at First Bite, and film leads dried up quickly, with Hamilton being unable to secure financing for a long-planned biopic of C.C. Julian. Instead, he focused on television with the made-for-television movies Malibu (1983) and Two Fathers' Justice (1985). In the mid-1980s, Hamilton starred in the sixth season of the Aaron Spelling-produced television serial Dynasty. He supported Joan Collins in the miniseries Monte Carlo (1986) and had the lead role in the series Spies (1987). He supported Elizabeth Taylor in Poker Alice (1987).

=== 1990s ===
A break for Hamilton came in 1990 when Francis Ford Coppola cast him as B.J. Harrison, the Corleone family's lawyer, in The Godfather Part III. For the second time, he portrayed a murderer on the television series Columbo, starring as the host of a TV true-crime show in the 1991 episode "Caution: Murder Can Be Hazardous to Your Health". He had been in the 1975 episode "A Deadly State of Mind". Hamilton had small roles in Doc Hollywood (1991), Once Upon a Crime (1992), and Amore! (1993), and guest-starred on Diagnosis: Murder and Dream On. He went to Germany to make At the Edge of Paradise (1993). He did Two Fathers: Justice for the Innocent (1994), Vanished (1995), and Playback (1996); and guest-starred on the shows Bonnie, Hart to Hart, and The Guilt.

He was in Meet Wally Sparks (1997), 8 Heads in a Duffel Bag (1997), and the miniseries Rough Riders (1997), where he portrayed William Randolph Hearst. It was sometimes said that Hamilton resembled Warren Beatty. Beatty's political satire Bulworth (1998) contained a running gag, with Hamilton appearing as himself. Hamilton had a regular role on the TV series Jenny (1997). He was in Casper Meets Wendy (1998), P.T. Barnum (1999), and She's Too Tall (1999). He was a semi-regular celebrity guest on the 1998–99 syndicated version of Match Game.

=== 2000s ===
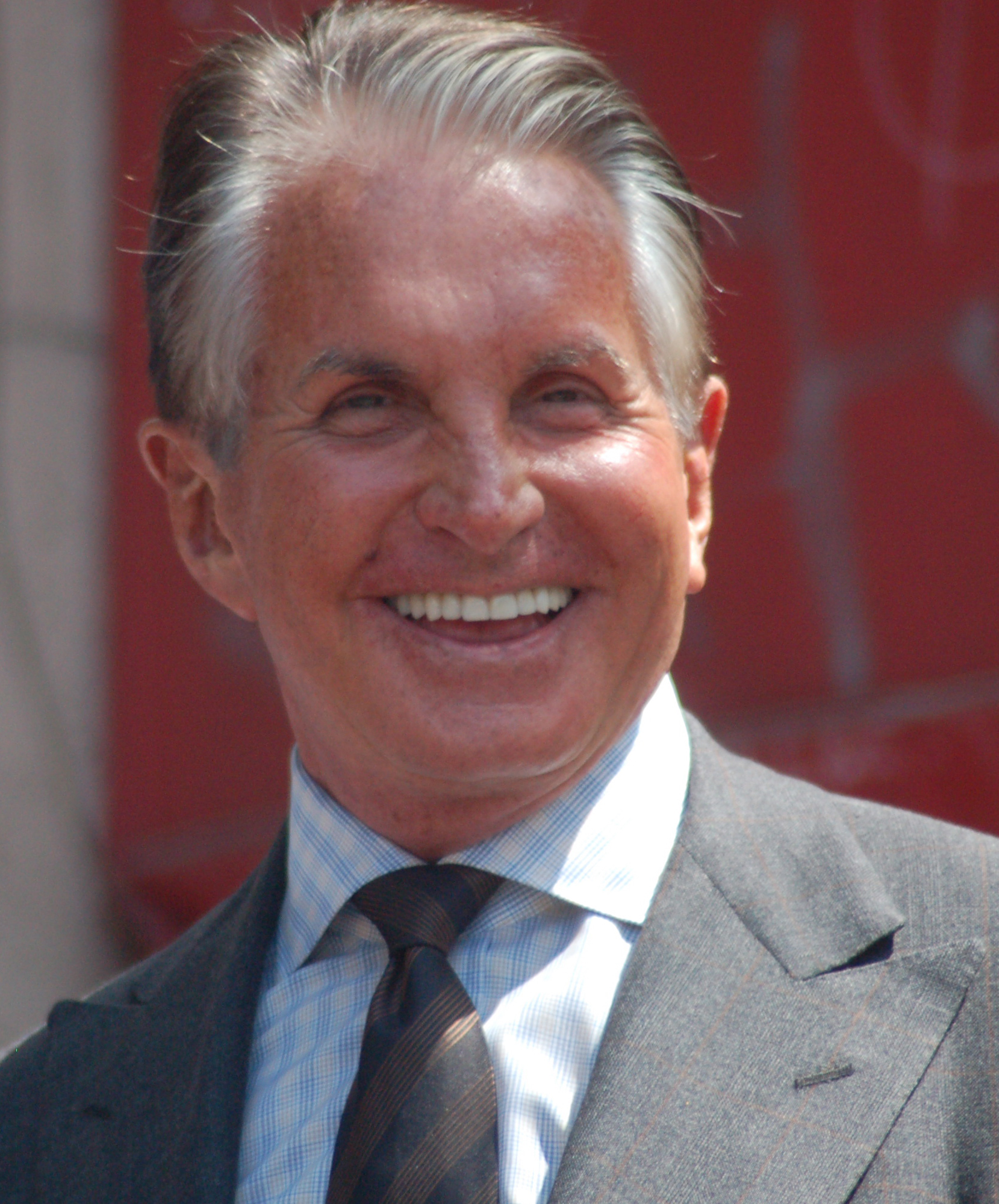
Hamilton receiving a star on the Hollywood Walk of Fame on his 70th birthday, 2009.

In 2001, Hamilton starred on Broadway in the play Chicago as Billy Flynn. He played the role from November 21, 2001, to February 17, 2002; June 4 to July 29, 2002; and September 14 to October 7, 2007.

In 2003, Hamilton hosted The Family, a reality television series, for one season. The program starred 10 members from a traditional Italian-American family, each fighting for a prize of $1 million. In 2006, Hamilton competed in the second season of Dancing with the Stars with professional Edyta Sliwinska. They lasted until the sixth round. At 66 and recovering from knee injuries, Hamilton, unable to match his younger competitors' limber moves, charmed the audience and judges with silly dances that used props, including a Zorro mask and the sword from Zorro, The Gay Blade.

In 2007, according to Reuters, Hamilton was one of the top contenders to replace Bob Barker as host of The Price Is Right, along with Mark Steines and Todd Newton. However, Drew Carey was named as Barker's successor. Hamilton has hosted the live stage adaptation of the show The Price Is Right Live! In August 2008, he co-starred in Coma, a web series on Crackle. Hamilton was executive producer of the 2009 film loosely based on his early life and relationship with his mother, My One and Only.

Hamilton was honored with a star on the Hollywood Walk of Fame on August 12, 2009. In 1999, a Golden Palm Star on the Walk of Stars was dedicated to him. Hamilton appeared as a contestant on the UK edition of I'm a Celebrity...Get Me Out of Here! in November 2009. Hamilton walked out of the jungle on November 30, 2009, telling the other contestants that he wasn't there to win but to have fun. Hamilton was considered one of the favorites to win the series. In 2010, he was chosen as one of David Hasselhoff's roasters in the Comedy Central Roast of David Hasselhoff. Starting in 2011, Hamilton starred as Georges in the national tour of the Tony-winning revival of La Cage aux Folles. He was still starring in the show as of June 2012.

In 2015, George and his ex-wife Alana Hamilton appeared in Season 4/Episode 10 of Celebrity Wife Swap. Alana swapped with Angela "Big Ang" Raiola of Mob Wives and her husband Neil Murphy. In 2016, Hamilton appeared in commercials for KFC as the "Extra Crispy Colonel", a deeply tanned version of the company's mascot Colonel Sanders, a role which he returned to in 2018. On July 6, 2018, Hamilton portrayed the Colonel on General Hospital.

== Business endeavors ==
In the late 1980s, Hamilton launched the George Hamilton Skin Care System and the George Hamilton Sun Care System and tanning salons. A cigar lounge bearing his name opened in the late 1990s at the New York, New York, hotel in Las Vegas and other locations, along with a line of cigars bearing his name. A 1998 article in Cigar Aficionado called Hamilton's style "Cary Grant meets Pat Riley".

In April 2006, Hamilton served as grand marshal for the 79th Annual Shenandoah Apple Blossom Festival in Winchester, Virginia.

== Friendship and business dealings with Imelda Marcos ==
Beginning in 1979, Hamilton had a "prominent friendship" with Imelda Marcos, the first lady of the Philippines and the wife of Philippine dictator and kleptocrat Ferdinand Marcos. Hamilton was named as an unindicted co-conspirator in a federal fraud and racketeering case against the Marcoses, which claimed that the Marcoses used Hamilton as a front to move money and had funneled more than $12 million through Hamilton’s personal accounts before they went into exile in 1986, with Saudi businessman and arms dealer Adnan Khashoggi acting at the behest of the Marcoses in some of these schemes. Ferdinand died before going to trial and Imelda was acquitted.

Hamilton unsuccessfully sought to keep sealed hundreds of pages of records and testimony, arguing that a release would be a violation of his privacy; his efforts were rejected by U.S. District Judge Mariana Pfaelzer and later by the Ninth Circuit Court of Appeals, which called Hamilton "a noted man-about-town" who should expect to be the object of publicity.

== Personal life ==
In 1966, Hamilton had a relationship with Lynda Bird Johnson, the daughter of U.S. President Lyndon B. Johnson.

From 1972 to 1976, Hamilton was married to actress Alana Stewart. Their son, Ashley George, was born in 1974. The divorced Hamiltons reunited in the mid-1990s to co-host the daytime talk show George & Alana, and again in 2015, as stars of the reality show Stewarts & Hamiltons.

From 1995 to 1999, Hamilton dated Kimberly Blackford, whom he met in Fort Lauderdale when she was a swimsuit model. In December 1999, Kimberly gave birth to their son.

As a contestant in I'm a Celebrity in 2009, Hamilton revealed he had dated at least four Miss Worlds. In 2019, Hamilton said he was romantically unattached but enjoyed dating different ladies.

According to Burt Reynolds's autobiography, Hamilton has a healthy sense of humor, even when the humor is directed at him. Reynolds wrote that he made up a birthday card for Hamilton with a composite photograph of Tony Curtis and Anthony Perkins, titled "To George, love from Mum and Dad". Hamilton found the card hilarious and showed it to everybody.

The 2009 comedy film, My One and Only, is loosely based on stories about his early life on the road with his mother and brother. It features anecdotes that Hamilton told Merv Griffin.

== Filmography ==
=== Film ===
- Lone Star (1952) as Noah (uncredited)
- Crime and Punishment U.S.A. (1959) as Robert
- Home from the Hill (1960) as Theron Hunnicutt
- All the Fine Young Cannibals (1960) as Tony McDowall
- Where the Boys Are (1960) as Ryder Smith
- Angel Baby (1961) as Paul Strand
- By Love Possessed (1961) as Warren Winner
- A Thunder of Drums (1961) as Lt. Curtis McQuade
- The Light in the Piazza (1962) as Fabrizio Naccarelli
- Two Weeks in Another Town (1962) as Davie Drew
- The Victors (1963) as Cpl. Theodore Trower
- Act One (1963) as Moss Hart
- Looking for Love (1964) as himself (cameo)
- Your Cheatin' Heart (1964) as Hank Williams
- Viva Maria! (1965) as Flores
- That Man George (1966) as George
- Doctor, You've Got to Be Kidding! (1967) as Harlan Wycliff
- A Time for Killing (1967) as Capt. Dorrit Bentley
- Jack of Diamonds (1967) as Jeff Hill
- The Power (1968) as Prof. Jim Tanner
- Togetherness (1970) as Jack DuPont
- Elvis: That's the Way It Is (1970) as himself (uncredited)
- Evel Knievel (1971) as Evel Knievel
- The Man Who Loved Cat Dancing (1973) as Willard Crocker
- Medusa (1973) as Jeffrey
- Once Is Not Enough (1975) as David Milford
- The Happy Hooker Goes to Washington (1977) as Ward Thompson
- The Magnificent Hustle (1978) as Donald Hightower
- Sextette (1978) as Vance Norton
- From Hell to Victory (1979) as Maurice Bernard
- Love at First Bite (1979) as Count Vladimir Dracula
- Death Car on the Freeway (1979) as Ray Jeffries
- Zorro, The Gay Blade (1981) as Zorro The Gay Blade / Don Diego Vega / Bunny Wigglesworth
- The Godfather Part III (1990) as B. J. Harrison
- Doc Hollywood (1991) as Doctor Halberstrom
- Once Upon a Crime (1992) as Alfonso de la Pena
- Amore! (1993) as Rudolpho Carbonera
- Double Dragon (1994) as Channel 102 News Anchor (uncredited)
- Playback (1996) as Gil Braman
- Meet Wally Sparks (1997) as himself
- 8 Heads in a Duffel Bag (1997) as Dick Bennett
- Bulworth (1998) as himself (uncredited)
- Casper Meets Wendy (1998) as Desmond Spellman
- She's Too Tall (1999) as Alonso Palermo
- Off Key (2001) as Armand
- Crocodile Dundee in Los Angeles (2001) as himself (cameo)
- Reflections of Evil (2002) as Duncan Carlyle
- Hollywood Ending (2002) as Ed
- Pets (2002) as Von Steiger ('The Hand')
- The Little Unicorn (2002) as The Great Allonso
- The L.A. Riot Spectacular (2005) as The King of Beverly Hills
- Rumor Has It... (2005) as himself (cameo) (uncredited)
- Melvin Smarty (2012) as Hitman / Mexican Colonel
- Silver Skies (2015) as Phil
- The Congressman (2016) as Laird Devereaux
- Swiped (2018) as Phil Singer
- All Terrain (2022) as Graverly

=== Television ===
- The Donna Reed Show (one episode, 1959) as Herbie Shields
- The Rogues (one episode, 1964) as Jamie
- Burke's Law (TV series) Who Killed Mother Goose? (one episode, 1965) as Little John
- A Farewell to Arms (1966) (miniseries) as Lt. Frederick Henry
- Harold Robbins' The Survivors (1969) as Duncan Carlyle
- Paris 7000 (1970) (canceled after 10 episodes) as Jack Brennan
- The Last of the Powerseekers (1971) as Duncan Carlyle
- The Dead Don't Die (1975) as Don Drake
- Columbo: A Deadly State of Mind (1975) as Dr. Marcus Collier
- Roots (1977) (miniseries) as Stephen Bennett
- McCloud: The Great Taxicab Stampede (1977) as Keith Hampton
- The Strange Possession of Mrs. Oliver (1977) as Greg Oliver
- Killer on Board (1977) as Glenn Lyle
- The Users (1978) as Adam Baker
- The Eddie Capra Mysteries (1978 – Episode: "Nightmare at Pendragon Castle") as Leo Gerling
- The Seekers (1979) (miniseries) as Lt. Hamilton Stovall
- Institute for Revenge (1979) as Alan Roberto
- Express to Terror (1979) as David Belnik
- Death Car on the Freeway (1979) as Ray Jeffries
- The Great Cash Giveaway Getaway (1980) as Hightower
- The Fantastic Miss Piggy Show (1982) (TV special) as himself
- Malibu (1983) (miniseries) as Jay Pomerantz
- Two Fathers' Justice (1985) as Trent Bradley
- Dynasty (cast member from 1985 to 1986) as Joel Abrigore
- Monte Carlo (1986) (miniseries) as Harry Price
- Spies (1987) as Ian Stone
- Poker Alice (1987) as Cousin John Moffit
- Columbo: Caution: Murder Can Be Hazardous to Your Health (1991) as Wade Anders
- The House on Sycamore Street (1992) as J.D. Gantry / Harry Lennox
- Birds of a Feather: It Happened in Hollywood (1993) as himself
- Paradise at the End of the Mountains (1993) as Earl Henry von Hohenlodern
- Two Fathers: Justice for the Innocent (1994) as Bradley
- The Bold and the Beautiful (1994)
- George & Alana (1995–1996) as himself
- Vanished (1995) as Malcolm Patterson
- The Guilt (1996) as Alan Van Buren
- Hart to Hart: Till Death Do Us Hart (1996) as Karl Von Ostenberg
- Rough Riders (1997) (miniseries) as William Randolph Hearst
- Miss USA & Miss Universe (1997) as Host
- Jenny (1997–1998) as Guy Hathaway
- Baywatch (1 episode, 1999) as Earl
- P.T. Barnum (1999) as Francis Olmsted
- Nash Bridges (2000) as Raymond Peck
- The Family (2003) as Host
- Las Vegas (guest appearance 2004) as Bernard Taylor
- Too Cool for Christmas (2004) as Santa Claus
- Joey (2005) as himself
- Dancing with the Stars (2006) as Contestant
- I'm a Celebrity...Get Me Out of Here! (2009) as himself
- Comedy Central Roast of David Hasselhoff (2010) as himself – Roaster
- Hot in Cleveland (2013) as Robin
- Stewarts & Hamiltons (8 episodes, 2015) as himself
- Celebrity Wife Swap (1 episode, 2015) as himself
- 2 Broke Girls (1 episode, 2016) as Bob
- American Housewife (recurring, 2017–2019) as Spencer Blitz
- General Hospital (July 6, 2018) as Colonel Sanders
- Grace and Frankie (1 episode, 2019) as Jack Patterson

== Books ==
- Life's Little Pleasures (co-authored with Alysse Minkoff) (1998) ISBN 978-1575440866
- Don't Mind if I Do (co-authored with William Stadiem) (2009) ISBN 978-1416545071

== In literature ==
In the comic strip Doonesbury, Hamilton is the namesake of the fictional "George Hamilton Cocoa Butter Open", described as the Le Mans of the (also fictional) professional tanning circuit, and "Tanmaster Hamilton" is the idol of character Zonker Harris who competes on that circuit.
