= Jacoba Atlas =

American writer and television producer

- Education: University of California; UCLA School of Theater, Film and Television
- Occupations: Journalist, music critic, novelist, screenwriter
- Awards: Peabody Award; Emmy Award; CableACE Award

Jacoba Atlas is an American executive producer in television, also publishing as a journalist, music critic, novelist, screenwriter and documentary filmmaker. She won a Peabody Award, an Emmy Award and a CableACE Award for Survivors of the Holocaust (1996), a TV documentary made for TBS.

Atlas was a rock critic and film critic in the 1970s, serving as the West Coast correspondent of Melody Maker in the UK. She wrote for KRLA Beat, the Los Angeles Free Press and several other publications. She moved to television, working for NBC News in the 1980s, rising to senior producer on the Today show. She co-founded VU Productions with Pat Mitchell in 1990, writing and producing documentaries. Turner Broadcasting System hired her as an executive, after which she was an executive producer for CNN, then vice president at PBS in the 2000s.

In 2019, Atlas made Pushout: The Criminalization of Black Girls in Schools, airing on PBS.

== Early life and education ==
Atlas is the daughter of Jewish dramatist Dorothy Cohen and Guggenheim Fellow playwright, Hollywood screenwriter Leopold Atlas. Her father was investigated as a Communist by the House Un-American Activities Committee, and was blacklisted. He testified and named 37 names in 1953. Atlas was seven years old when her father died in 1954 of a heart attack. She attended the University of California, Berkeley, during the Free Speech Movement, then shifted to the UCLA School of Theater, Film and Television for graduate studies. In 1976, she wrote a dissertation on labor unions in the Hollywood film industry.

== Writing career ==
Atlas first published as a journalist. She wrote an article about hippies in the KRLA Beat in August 1967. She praised Harry Nilsson in early 1968. For TeenSet magazine in 1968 she interviewed Jimi Hendrix at his "rented house in Benedict Canyon," recognized by Atlas as the house where the Beatles rested between concert legs in 1965. She wrote reviews of the Doors in 1968 and Steppenwolf in 1969 for Hullabaloo, an early name for Circus rock magazine. She published frequently in Melody Maker in the UK – she was their West Coast correspondent – including a piece based on a lengthy, relaxed interview with neighbor Joni Mitchell at her Laurel Canyon home in early 1970. Atlas described her own Laurel Canyon house as small, with an inoperative fireplace, in an area recently plagued by smog.

Atlas previewed the upcoming Nilsson Sings Newman album in 1969 for Melody Maker, reviewed the Doors again in 1971 for New Musical Express, and she wrote about the increasing number of women in hard rock for Billboard, calling out Grace Slick, the Ace of Cups and Fanny, among others. For Melody Maker in 1972 she talked to Helen Reddy about "I Am Woman", and to John Prine about his Diamonds in the Rough album. In 1974 she wrote about Neil Sedaka's UK popularity for Melody Maker. She reviewed concerts by Aretha Franklin, the Rolling Stones, the Band, Leon Russell, and wrote about a "disastrous appearance" by Joe Cocker. She profiled Neil Young and James Taylor. Other interviews she conducted were with Delaney & Bonnie, Smokey Robinson, Ry Cooder, producer Terry Melcher of the Byrds, Maria Muldaur, the American Breed, Robert Plant, Kris Kristofferson, Rita Coolidge, jazz saxophonist Charles Lloyd, singer Brenton Wood, composer Tim Hardin, protest singer Phil Ochs, English rocker Arthur Brown, Gram Parsons, Arlo Guthrie, Elton John, the Four Seasons, Rod McKuen, Johnny Mathis, Jethro Tull, Dennis Wilson, Leonard Cohen and the Jackson 5.

She also wrote for the Los Angeles Free Press, starting with an interview with director Robert Altman discussing his 1970 film M*A*S*H. Atlas wrote articles based on interviews with actors Mae West and George C. Scott, and an investigative piece about the backstory of the 1974 film Chinatown: the California water wars. For Film Comment in 1975, she interviewed Mel Brooks. Atlas was the film critic for the Free Press in the mid-1970s. She interviewed Goldie Hawn for Parents magazine in 1978. She contributed reviews to Ampersand college entertainment magazine.

In 1989 through Dutton, Atlas published a fiction novel, Palace of Light, with characters placed within union politics in the early years of Hollywood. In 1994, she wrote A Century of Women, published through TBS Books as a companion to the Turner Broadcasting System television series of the same name.

== Television ==
Atlas first worked in the television industry as a research assistant to Rona Barrett on Good Morning America in 1976. She was hired by NBC News, rising to spend five years as senior producer on the Today show. In October 1990, Atlas co-founded VU Productions with Pat Mitchell, to create non-fiction content for Gary David Goldberg's Ubu Productions. In 1991, for VU Productions, Atlas co-wrote with Mitchell the screenplay for Danger: Kids at Work, a TV movie starring Amy Irving. Under VU Productions, Atlas and Mitchell produced A Century of Women in 1994 for Turner Broadcasting System (TBS), a six-hour miniseries documentary broadcast in two episodes, narrated by Jane Fonda. A Century of Women was nominated for an Emmy Award in 1995.

In 1996, TBS tapped Atlas to manage the production of Survivors of the Holocaust, with executive producer Steven Spielberg joining Mitchell. The documentary won two Emmy Awards, the first for "Outstanding Informational Special", given to the filmmakers, including Atlas, Mitchell, Spielberg and director Allan Holzman, and the second for "Outstanding Individual Achievement – Informational Programming" given to Holzman for his editing of the film. It also won a Peabody Award and a CableACE Award, the latter presented to the filmmakers at the 18th CableACE Awards in 1996. Atlas supervised an independent documentary, Dying to Tell the Story (1998), about photojournalist Dan Eldon who was killed at 22 in Somalia.

After TBS, Atlas worked for CNN, rising to the position of vice president and supervising producer. She helped launch CNN NewsStand, a news magazine, and was executive producer. With CNN, she produced the documentary Soldiers of Peace: A Children's Crusade (1999), describing children in Colombia working toward peace. Starting in June 2000 at PBS, Atlas was senior vice president overseeing content for six years under president Mitchell, a role she shared with John Wilson: Atlas was based on the West Coast while Wilson was in Florida. In June 2006, Atlas left PBS when they closed operations in Los Angeles.

Atlas collaborated with Tavis Smiley on a series of documentaries for PBS. Atlas was involved with seven broadcasts, including: "A Call to Conscience" (2010), "Too Important to Fail" (2011), "Education Under Arrest" (2013), and "Getting Ahead" (2016). One of the series was about Venezuelan conductor Gustavo Dudamel.

Atlas wrote and directed Pushout: The Criminalization of Black Girls in Schools, based on the 2016 book of the same name written by Monique W. Morris. The documentary was broadcast in 2019 by PBS, telling about African American girls disproportionately sent to the juvenile justice system.

== Awards and recognition ==
Atlas won a Peabody Award, a CableACE Award and an Emmy Award for the TBS movie Survivors of the Holocaust (1996). She was nominated for two more Emmys: in 1995 for A Century of Women, and in 1999 for Dying to Tell the Story.

== Filmography ==
- 2019: Pushout: The Criminalization of Black Girls in Schools
- 2016: Defying the Nazis: The Sharps' War
- 2016: Tavis Smiley Reports: Getting Ahead
- 2013: Tavis Smiley Reports: Education Under Arrest
- 2013: Walking the Camino: Six Ways to Santiago
- 2012: Tavis Smiley Reports: Dudamel: Conducting a Life
- 2011: Extraordinary Moms
- 2011: Miss Representation
- 2011: Tavis Smiley Reports: Too Important to Fail
- 2010: Tavis Smiley Reports: A Call to Conscience
- 2009–2015: Craft in America
- 1999: Soldiers of Peace: A Children's Crusade
- 1998: Warner Bros. 75th Anniversary: No Guts, No Glory
- 1998: Assassinated: The Last Days of King & Kennedy
- 1998: Dying to Tell the Story
- 1997: The Coming Plague
- 1996: The Good, the Bad & the Beautiful
- 1996: Survivors of the Holocaust
- 1995: Anatomy of Love
- 1994: A Century of Women
- 1992: The Home Show
- 1991: Danger: Kids at Work
