= Seraphim Records =

Seraphim Records is the sister label of Angel Records.

== History ==
Seraphim Records was founded in 1966 as the sister label of Angel Records; re-releasing prior recordings by the Angel label at bargain prices. It continued in this practice through the 1980s. The very first release was of stereophonic recordings by Sir Thomas Beecham and the Royal Philharmonic Orchestra, including several pieces previously unreleased.

Seraphim has specialized in reissues of historic EMI/HMV recordings, including many originally released on 78-rpm records. In 1967, Seraphim reissued some of the 1937–39 recordings by Arturo Toscanini and the BBC Symphony Orchestra. Operatic reissues included Pietro Mascagni's historic 1940 recording of his opera Cavalleria rusticana, complete with the original spoken introduction (in Italian) by the composer. In 1972, a complete recording of Richard Wagner's Ring Cycle was released on Seraphim with Wilhelm Furtwängler conducting the Rome Symphony Orchestra.

In the compact disc era, EMI used the Seraphim label primarily for reissues of stereophonic recordings originally released on LP. Some early digital recordings from the 1980s were also reissued on the label.

In 2013, EMI's classical-music operations were sold to Warner Music Group after EMI Records was absorbed by Universal Music. The status of which company currently controls the Seraphim label is unclear.

== See also ==
- List of record labels
- Angel Records
