= Fine (band) =

American band

- Labels: Elektra; Flip
- Past members: Ashley Hamilton; Milo De Cruz; Michael Chaves; Chris Lloyd

Fine (also stylized as F.I.N.E.) were a Los Angeles–based rock band of the late 1990s led by Ashley Hamilton.

== Discography ==
- Against the View – February 23, 1999
  - single – Wrecking Ball 1999
