= List of the Beatles' live performances =

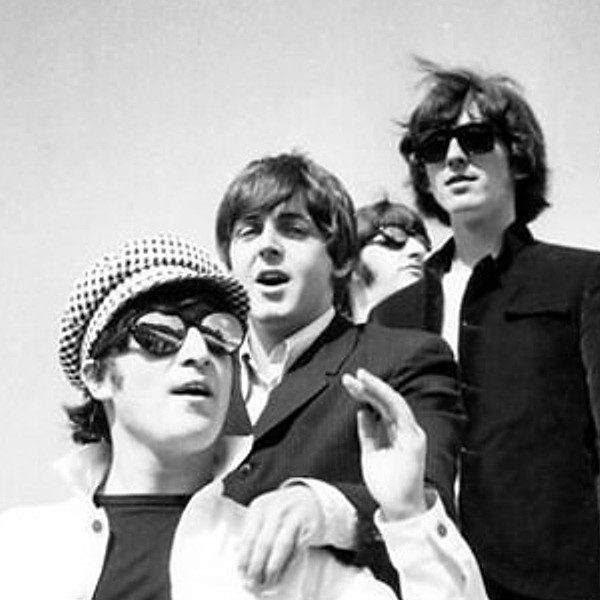
The Beatles arriving for concerts in Madrid, July 1965

From 1961 to 1966, the English rock band the Beatles performed all over the Western world. They began performing live as the Beatles on 15 August 1960 at The Jacaranda in Liverpool and continued in various clubs during their visit to Hamburg, West Germany, until 1962, with a line-up of John Lennon, Paul McCartney, George Harrison, Pete Best, and Stuart Sutcliffe. Following Sutcliffe's departure, the Beatles continued performing throughout 1962, most notably at The Cavern Club in Liverpool, where they were discovered by Brian Epstein and George Martin. After replacing Best with Ringo Starr, the Beatles performed a series of concert tours throughout the UK in 1963, before they left for the US in early 1964. As Beatlemania and the British Invasion came into full force, they began a world tour and continued to perform in the UK and US throughout 1965, including a well-known performance at Shea Stadium in New York City.

In 1966, following a controversial tour of Germany, Japan and the Philippines and a tour of the US (which was plagued with backlash due to Lennon's "more popular than Jesus" comment), the Beatles ceased performing live due to being fed up with touring and became a studio-only band. Their last commercial performance was at San Francisco's Candlestick Park on 29 August. It marked the end of a four-year period dominated by almost nonstop touring that included over 1,400 concert appearances internationally. The group made no more public appearances until 30 January 1969, when they performed an unannounced rooftop concert at their Apple Corps headquarters in London. Numerous documentaries about their live performances have been made before and after their break-up, including The Beatles at Shea Stadium (1965) and The Beatles: Eight Days a Week (2016).

Below is a list of all known live performances the Beatles undertook during their career as a band. Any appearances with members that differ from the best-known line-up (Lennon, McCartney, Harrison and Starr) are marked accordingly.

== List of live performances ==
=== 1960 ===
The band played a farewell show at The Jacaranda in Liverpool before driving to Hamburg from outside the venue the next day. The show was the band's first live performance after changing their name from the Silver Beetles to the Beatles, it was also Pete Best's first live performance with the band. The full line-up was John Lennon, Paul McCartney, George Harrison, Stuart Sutcliffe and Pete Best.

Date	Town or city	Country	Venue	Notes
14 August 1960	Liverpool	England	The Jacaranda	
17 August 1960	Hamburg	Germany	Indra Club	

=== 1961 ===
At the beginning of 1961, the Beatles' lineup was John Lennon, Paul McCartney, George Harrison, Stuart Sutcliffe, and Pete Best. Sutcliffe left the band in June or July 1961; McCartney switched from rhythm guitar and piano to bass after Sutcliffe left.

Date	Town or city	Country	Venue	Notes
5 January 1961	Litherland	England	Litherland Town Hall	
6 January 1961	Bootle	England	St John's Hall	
7 January 1961	Aintree	England	Aintree Institute	
7 January 1961	Seaforth	England	Lathom Hall	
8 January 1961	Liverpool	England	The Casbah Coffee Club	
13 January 1961	Aintree	England	Aintree Institute	
14 January 1961	Aintree	England	Aintree Institute	
15 January 1961	Liverpool	England	The Casbah Coffee Club	
18 January 1961	Aintree	England	Aintree Institute	
19 January 1961	Crosby	England	Alexandra Hall	
20 January 1961	Seaforth	England	Lathom Hall	
21 January 1961	Seaforth	England	Lathom Hall	
25 January 1961	Huyton	England	Hambleton Hall	
26 January 1961	Litherland	England	Litherland Town Hall	
27 January 1961	Aintree	England	Aintree Institute	
28 January 1961	Seaforth	England	Lathom Hall	
29 January 1961	Liverpool	England	The Casbah Coffee Club	
30 January 1961	Seaforth	England	Lathom Hall	
1 February 1961	Huyton	England	Hambleton Hall	
2 February 1961	Litherland	England	Litherland Town Hall	
3 February 1961	Bootle	England	St John's Hall	
4 February 1961	Seaforth	England	Lathom Hall	
5 February 1961	Walton	England	Blair Hall	
6 February 1961	Seaforth	England	Lathom Hall	
7 February 1961	Liverpool	England	Merseyside Civil Service Club	
8 February 1961	Aintree	England	Aintree Institute	
9 February 1961	Liverpool	England	The Cavern Club (Note: Between February 1961 and August 1963, the Beatles made a total of at least 275 appearances at the Cavern, more than any other venue.)	
10 February 1961	Aintree	England	Aintree Institute	
11 February 1961	Liverpool	England	Cassanova Club	
12 February 1961	Liverpool	England	The Casbah Coffee Club	
14 February 1961	Liverpool	England	Cassanova Club	
15 February 1961	Huyton	England	Hambleton Hall	
16 February 1961	Liverpool	England	Litherland Town Hall	
17 February 1961	Liverpool	England	St John's Hall	
18 February 1961	Aintree	England	Aintree Institute	
19 February 1961	Liverpool	England	The Casbah Coffee Club	
21 February 1961	Liverpool	England	The Cavern Club	
22 February 1961	Huyton	England	Hambleton Hall	
24 February 1961	Wallasey	England	Grosvenor Ballroom	
25 February 1961	Liverpool	England	Lathom Hall	
26 February 1961	Liverpool	England	The Casbah Coffee Club	
28 February 1961	Liverpool	England	The Cavern Club	
1 March 1961	Aintree	England	Aintree Institute	
2 March 1961	Liverpool	England	Litherland Town Hall	
3 March 1961	Bootle	England	St John's Hall	
4 March 1961	Aintree	England	Aintree Institute	
5 March 1961	Liverpool	England	The Casbah Coffee Club	
6 March 1961	Liverpool	England	Liverpool Jazz Society	
7 March 1961	Liverpool	England	Cassanova Club	
8 March 1961	Huyton	England	Hambleton Hall	
10 March 1961	Wallasey	England	Grosvenor Ballroom	
11 March 1961	Aintree	England	Aintree Institute	
12 March 1961	Liverpool	England	The Casbah Coffee Club	
13 March 1961	Liverpool	England	The Cavern Club	
14 March 1961	Liverpool	England	The Cavern Club	
15 March 1961	Liverpool	England	Liverpool Jazz Society	
16 March 1961	Liverpool	England	The Cavern Club	
17 March 1961	Liverpool	England	Mossway Hall	
19 March 1961	Liverpool	England	The Casbah Coffee Club	
20 March 1961	Huyton	England	Hambleton Hall	
21 March 1961	Liverpool	England	The Cavern Club	
22 March 1961	Liverpool	England	The Cavern Club	
24 March 1961	Liverpool	England	The Cavern Club	
26 March 1961	Liverpool	England	The Casbah Coffee Club	
27 March 1961	Hamburg	West Germany	Top Ten Club	
28 March 1961	Hamburg	West Germany	Top Ten Club	
29 March 1961	Hamburg	West Germany	Top Ten Club	
30 March 1961	Hamburg	West Germany	Top Ten Club	
31 March 1961	Hamburg	West Germany	Top Ten Club	
1 April 1961	Hamburg	West Germany	Top Ten Club	
2 April 1961	Hamburg	West Germany	Top Ten Club	
3 April 1961	Hamburg	West Germany	Top Ten Club	
4 April 1961	Hamburg	West Germany	Top Ten Club	
5 April 1961	Hamburg	West Germany	Top Ten Club	
6 April 1961	Hamburg	West Germany	Top Ten Club	
7 April 1961	Hamburg	West Germany	Top Ten Club	
8 April 1961	Hamburg	West Germany	Top Ten Club	
9 April 1961	Hamburg	West Germany	Top Ten Club	
10 April 1961	Hamburg	West Germany	Top Ten Club	
11 April 1961	Hamburg	West Germany	Top Ten Club	
12 April 1961	Hamburg	West Germany	Top Ten Club	
13 April 1961	Hamburg	West Germany	Top Ten Club	
14 April 1961	Hamburg	West Germany	Top Ten Club	
15 April 1961	Hamburg	West Germany	Top Ten Club	
16 April 1961	Hamburg	West Germany	Top Ten Club	
17 April 1961	Hamburg	West Germany	Top Ten Club	
18 April 1961	Hamburg	West Germany	Top Ten Club	
19 April 1961	Hamburg	West Germany	Top Ten Club	
20 April 1961	Hamburg	West Germany	Top Ten Club	
21 April 1961	Hamburg	West Germany	Top Ten Club	
22 April 1961	Hamburg	West Germany	Top Ten Club	
23 April 1961	Hamburg	West Germany	Top Ten Club	
24 April 1961	Hamburg	West Germany	Top Ten Club	
25 April 1961	Hamburg	West Germany	Top Ten Club	
26 April 1961	Hamburg	West Germany	Top Ten Club	
27 April 1961	Hamburg	West Germany	Top Ten Club	
28 April 1961	Hamburg	West Germany	Top Ten Club	
29 April 1961	Hamburg	West Germany	Top Ten Club	
30 April 1961	Hamburg	West Germany	Top Ten Club	
1 May 1961	Hamburg	West Germany	Top Ten Club	
2 May 1961	Hamburg	West Germany	Top Ten Club	
3 May 1961	Hamburg	West Germany	Top Ten Club	
4 May 1961	Hamburg	West Germany	Top Ten Club	
5 May 1961	Hamburg	West Germany	Top Ten Club	
6 May 1961	Hamburg	West Germany	Top Ten Club	
7 May 1961	Hamburg	West Germany	Top Ten Club	
8 May 1961	Hamburg	West Germany	Top Ten Club	
9 May 1961	Hamburg	West Germany	Top Ten Club	
10 May 1961	Hamburg	West Germany	Top Ten Club	
11 May 1961	Hamburg	West Germany	Top Ten Club	
12 May 1961	Hamburg	West Germany	Top Ten Club	
13 May 1961	Hamburg	West Germany	Top Ten Club	
14 May 1961	Hamburg	West Germany	Top Ten Club	
15 May 1961	Hamburg	West Germany	Top Ten Club	
16 May 1961	Hamburg	West Germany	Top Ten Club	
17 May 1961	Hamburg	West Germany	Top Ten Club	
18 May 1961	Hamburg	West Germany	Top Ten Club	
19 May 1961	Hamburg	West Germany	Top Ten Club	
20 May 1961	Hamburg	West Germany	Top Ten Club	
21 May 1961	Hamburg	West Germany	Top Ten Club	
22 May 1961	Hamburg	West Germany	Top Ten Club	
23 May 1961	Hamburg	West Germany	Top Ten Club	
24 May 1961	Hamburg	West Germany	Top Ten Club	
25 May 1961	Hamburg	West Germany	Top Ten Club	
26 May 1961	Hamburg	West Germany	Top Ten Club	
27 May 1961	Hamburg	West Germany	Top Ten Club	
28 May 1961	Hamburg	West Germany	Top Ten Club	
29 May 1961	Hamburg	West Germany	Top Ten Club	
30 May 1961	Hamburg	West Germany	Top Ten Club	
31 May 1961	Hamburg	West Germany	Top Ten Club	
1 June 1961	Hamburg	West Germany	Top Ten Club	
2 June 1961	Hamburg	West Germany	Top Ten Club	
3 June 1961	Hamburg	West Germany	Top Ten Club	
4 June 1961	Hamburg	West Germany	Top Ten Club	
5 June 1961	Hamburg	West Germany	Top Ten Club	
6 June 1961	Hamburg	West Germany	Top Ten Club	
7 June 1961	Hamburg	West Germany	Top Ten Club	
8 June 1961	Hamburg	West Germany	Top Ten Club	
9 June 1961	Hamburg	West Germany	Top Ten Club	
10 June 1961	Hamburg	West Germany	Top Ten Club	
11 June 1961	Hamburg	West Germany	Top Ten Club	
12 June 1961	Hamburg	West Germany	Top Ten Club	
13 June 1961	Hamburg	West Germany	Top Ten Club	
14 June 1961	Hamburg	West Germany	Top Ten Club	
15 June 1961	Hamburg	West Germany	Top Ten Club	
16 June 1961	Hamburg	West Germany	Top Ten Club	
17 June 1961	Hamburg	West Germany	Top Ten Club	
18 June 1961	Hamburg	West Germany	Top Ten Club	
19 June 1961	Hamburg	West Germany	Top Ten Club	
20 June 1961	Hamburg	West Germany	Top Ten Club	
21 June 1961	Hamburg	West Germany	Top Ten Club	
22 June 1961	Hamburg	West Germany	Top Ten Club	
23 June 1961	Hamburg	West Germany	Top Ten Club	
24 June 1961	Hamburg	West Germany	Top Ten Club	
25 June 1961	Hamburg	West Germany	Top Ten Club	
26 June 1961	Hamburg	West Germany	Top Ten Club	
27 June 1961	Hamburg	West Germany	Top Ten Club	
28 June 1961	Hamburg	West Germany	Top Ten Club	
29 June 1961	Hamburg	West Germany	Top Ten Club	
30 June 1961	Hamburg	West Germany	Top Ten Club	
1 July 1961	Hamburg	West Germany	Top Ten Club	
2 July 1961	Hamburg	West Germany	Top Ten Club	
13 July 1961	Liverpool	England	St. John's Hall	
14 July 1961	Liverpool	England	The Cavern Club	
15 July 1961	Liverpool	England	Holyoake Hall	
16 July 1961	Walton	England	Blair Hall	
17 July 1961	Liverpool	England	Litherland Town Hall	
19 July 1961	Liverpool	England	The Cavern Club	
20 July 1961	Liverpool	England	St. John's Hall	
21 July 1961	Aintree	England	Aintree Institute	
22 July 1961	Liverpool	England	Holyoake Hall	
23 July 1961	Walton	England	Blair Hall	
24 July 1961	Liverpool	England	Litherland Town Hall	
25 July 1961	Liverpool	England	The Cavern Club	
26 July 1961	Liverpool	England	The Cavern Club	
27 July 1961	Liverpool	England	St. John's Hall	
28 July 1961	Aintree	England	Aintree Institute	
29 July 1961	Walton	England	Blair Hall	
30 July 1961	Walton	England	Blair Hall	
31 July 1961	Liverpool	England	Litherland Town Hall	
2 August 1961	Liverpool	England	The Cavern Club	
3 August 1961	Liverpool	England	St. John's Hall	
4 August 1961	Aintree	England	Aintree Institute	
5 August 1961	Liverpool	England	The Cavern Club	
6 August 1961	Liverpool	England	The Casbah Coffee Club	
7 August 1961	Liverpool	England	Litherland Town Hall	
8 August 1961	Liverpool	England	The Cavern Club	
9 August 1961	Liverpool	England	The Cavern Club	
10 August 1961	Liverpool	England	St. John's Hall	
11 August 1961	Liverpool	England	The Cavern Club	
12 August 1961	Aintree	England	Aintree Institute	
13 August 1961	Liverpool	England	The Casbah Coffee Club	
14 August 1961	Liverpool	England	The Cavern Club	
16 August 1961	Liverpool	England	The Cavern Club	
17 August 1961	Liverpool	England	St John's Hall	Johnny Gustafson guested on bass, allowing Paul McCartney wander in the crowd as he sang.
18 August 1961	Aintree	England	Aintree Institute	
19 August 1961	Aintree	England	Aintree Institute	
20 August 1961	Huyton	England	Hambleton Hall	
21 August 1961	Liverpool	England	The Cavern Club	
23 August 1961	Liverpool	England	The Cavern Club	
24 August 1961	Liverpool	England	St. John's Hall	
25 August 1961	Liverpool	England	The Cavern Club	
26 August 1961	Aintree	England	Aintree Institute	
27 August 1961	Liverpool	England	The Casbah Coffee Club	
28 August 1961	Liverpool	England	The Cavern Club	
29 August 1961	Liverpool	England	The Cavern Club	
30 August 1961	Liverpool	England	The Cavern Club	
31 August 1961	Liverpool	England	St. John's Hall	
1 September 1961	Liverpool	England	The Cavern Club	
2 September 1961	Aintree	England	Aintree Institute	
3 September 1961	Huyton	England	Hambleton Hall	
5 September 1961	Liverpool	England	The Cavern Club	
6 September 1961	Liverpool	England	The Cavern Club	
7 September 1961	Liverpool	England	Litherland Town Hall	
8 September 1961	Liverpool	England	St. John's Hall	
9 September 1961	Aintree	England	Aintree Institute	
10 September 1961	Liverpool	England	The Casbah Coffee Club	
11 September 1961	Liverpool	England	The Cavern Club	
13 September 1961	Liverpool	England	The Cavern Club	
14 September 1961	Liverpool	England	Litherland Town Hall	
15 September 1961	Wallasey	England	Grosvenor Ballroom	
16 September 1961	Aintree	England	Aintree Institute	
17 September 1961	Huyton	England	Hambleton Hall	
19 September 1961	Liverpool	England	The Cavern Club	
20 September 1961	Liverpool	England	The Cavern Club	
21 September 1961	Liverpool	England	Litherland Town Hall	
22 September 1961	Liverpool	England	Village Hall	
23 September 1961	Aintree	England	Aintree Institute	
24 September 1961	Liverpool	England	The Casbah Coffee Club	
25 September 1961	Liverpool	England	The Cavern Club	
27 September 1961	Liverpool	England	The Cavern Club	
28 September 1961	Liverpool	England	Litherland Town Hall	
29 September 1961	Liverpool	England	Village Hall	
15 October 1961	Maghull	England	Albany Cinema	
16 October 1961	Liverpool	England	The Cavern Club	
17 October 1961	Liverpool	England	David Lewis Club	
18 October 1961	Liverpool	England	The Cavern Club	
19 October 1961	Liverpool	England	Litherland Town Hall	
20 October 1961	Liverpool	England	Village Hall	
21 October 1961	Liverpool	England	The Cavern Club	
22 October 1961	Liverpool	England	The Casbah Coffee Club	
24 October 1961	Liverpool	England	The Cavern Club	
25 October 1961	Liverpool	England	The Cavern Club	
26 October 1961	Liverpool	England	The Cavern Club	
27 October 1961	Liverpool	England	Village Hall	
28 October 1961	Aintree	England	Aintree Institute	
29 October 1961	Huyton	England	Hambleton Hall	
30 October 1961	Liverpool	England	The Cavern Club	
31 October 1961	Liverpool	England	Litherland Town Hall	
1 November 1961	Liverpool	England	The Cavern Club	
3 November 1961	Liverpool	England	The Cavern Club	
4 November 1961	Liverpool	England	The Cavern Club	
7 November 1961	Liverpool	England	Merseyside Civil Service Club	
7 November 1961	Liverpool	England	The Cavern Club	
8 November 1961	Liverpool	England	The Cavern Club	
9 November 1961	Liverpool	England	The Cavern Club	
10 November 1961	Liverpool	England	Liverpool Town Hall	
10 November 1961	New Brighton	England	Tower Ballroom	
10 November 1961	Liverpool	England	Village Hall	
11 November 1961	Aintree	England	Aintree Institute	
12 November 1961	Liverpool	England	Hambleton Hall	
13 November 1961	Liverpool	England	The Cavern Club	
14 November 1961	Liverpool	England	Merseyside Civil Service Club	
14 November 1961	Liverpool	England	The Cavern Club	
15 November 1961	Liverpool	England	The Cavern Club	
17 November 1961	Liverpool	England	Village Hall	
17 November 1961	Liverpool	England	The Cavern Club	
18 November 1961	Liverpool	England	The Cavern Club	
19 November 1961	Liverpool	England	The Casbah Coffee Club	
21 November 1961	Liverpool	England	Merseyside Civil Service Club	
21 November 1961	Liverpool	England	The Cavern Club	
22 November 1961	Liverpool	England	The Cavern Club	
23 November 1961	Liverpool	England	The Cavern Club	
24 November 1961	Liverpool	England	The Casbah Coffee Club	
24 November 1961	New Brighton	England	Tower Ballroom	
26 November 1961	Liverpool	England	Hambleton Hall	
27 November 1961	Liverpool	England	The Cavern Club	
28 November 1961	Liverpool	England	Merseyside Civil Service Club	
29 November 1961	Liverpool	England	The Cavern Club	
1 December 1961	New Brighton	England	Tower Ballroom	
1 December 1961	Liverpool	England	The Cavern Club	
2 December 1961	Liverpool	England	The Cavern Club	
3 December 1961	Liverpool	England	The Casbah Coffee Club	
5 December 1961	Liverpool	England	The Cavern Club	
6 December 1961	Liverpool	England	The Cavern Club	
8 December 1961	Liverpool	England	The Cavern Club	
8 December 1961	New Brighton	England	Tower Ballroom	
9 December 1961	Aldershot	England	Palais Ballroom	
9 December 1961	London	England	The Gardenia Club	
10 December 1961	Liverpool	England	Hambleton Hall	
11 December 1961	Liverpool	England	The Cavern Club	
13 December 1961	Liverpool	England	The Cavern Club	
15 December 1961	New Brighton	England	Tower Ballroom	
15 December 1961	Liverpool	England	The Cavern Club	
16 December 1961	Liverpool	England	The Cavern Club	
17 December 1961	Liverpool	England	The Cavern Club	
18 December 1961	Liverpool	England	The Cavern Club	
19 December 1961	Liverpool	England	The Cavern Club	
20 December 1961	Liverpool	England	The Cavern Club	
21 December 1961	Liverpool	England	The Cavern Club	
23 December 1961	Liverpool	England	The Cavern Club	
26 December 1961	New Brighton	England	Tower Ballroom	
27 December 1961	Liverpool	England	The Cavern Club	
29 December 1961	Liverpool	England	The Cavern Club	
30 December 1961	Liverpool	England	The Cavern Club	

=== 1962 ===
All 1962 live performances listed include Pete Best up until 15 August 1962. Ringo Starr joins officially as of 18 August.

Date	Town or city	Country	Venue	Notes
3 January 1962	Liverpool	England	The Cavern Club	
5 January 1962	Liverpool	England	The Cavern Club	
6 January 1962	Liverpool	England	The Cavern Club	
7 January 1962	Liverpool	England	The Casbah Coffee Club	
9 January 1962	Liverpool	England	The Cavern Club	
10 January 1962	Liverpool	England	The Cavern Club	
11 January 1962	Liverpool	England	The Cavern Club	
12 January 1962	New Brighton	England	Tower Ballroom	
13 January 1962	Huyton	England	Hambleton Hall	
14 January 1962	Liverpool	England	The Casbah Coffee Club	
15 January 1962	Liverpool	England	The Cavern Club	
17 January 1962	Liverpool	England	The Cavern Club	
19 January 1962	New Brighton	England	Tower Ballroom	
20 January 1962	Liverpool	England	The Cavern Club	
21 January 1962	Liverpool	England	The Casbah Coffee Club	
22 January 1962	Southport	England	Kingsway Theater	
24 January 1962	Liverpool	England	The Cavern Club	
26 January 1962	New Brighton	England	Tower Ballroom	
27 January 1962	Aintree	England	Aintree Institute	
28 January 1962	Liverpool	England	The Casbah Coffee Club	
29 January 1962	Southport	England	Kingsway Theater	
30 January 1962	Liverpool	England	The Cavern Club	
31 January 1962	Liverpool	England	The Cavern Club	
1 February 1962	Liverpool	England	Thistle Cafe	
2 February 1962	Manchester	England	Oasis Club	
3 February 1962	Liverpool	England	The Cavern Club	
4 February 1962	Liverpool	England	The Casbah Coffee Club	
5 February 1962	Liverpool	England	The Cavern Club	
7 February 1962	Liverpool	England	The Cavern Club	
9 February 1962	Birkenhead	England	Birkenhead Technical College	
10 February 1962	Birkenhead	England	St. John's Church	
11 February 1962	Liverpool	England	The Casbah Coffee Club	
13 February 1962	Liverpool	England	The Cavern Club	
14 February 1962	Liverpool	England	The Cavern Club	
15 February 1962	New Brighton	England	Tower Ballroom	
16 February 1962	Birkenhead	England	Birkenhead Technical College	
17 February 1962	Liverpool	England	The Cavern Club	
18 February 1962	Liverpool	England	The Casbah Coffee Club	
19 February 1962	Liverpool	England	The Cavern Club	
20 February 1962	Southport	England	Floral Hall	
21 February 1962	Liverpool	England	The Cavern Club	
23 February 1962	New Brighton	England	Tower Ballroom	
24 February 1962	Hoylake	England	YMCA	
25 February 1962	Liverpool	England	The Casbah Coffee Club	
26 February 1962	Southport	England	Kingsway Theater	
27 February 1962	Liverpool	England	The Cavern Club	
28 February 1962	Liverpool	England	The Cavern Club	
1 March 1962	Liverpool	England	Storyville Jazz Club	
2 March 1962	Bootle	England	St. John's Hall	
3 March 1962	Liverpool	England	The Cavern Club	
4 March 1962	Liverpool	England	The Casbah Coffee Club	
5 March 1962	Southport	England	Kingsway Theater	
6 March 1962	Liverpool	England	The Cavern Club	
8 March 1962	Liverpool	England	Storyville Jazz Club	
9 March 1962	Liverpool	England	The Cavern Club	
10 March 1962	Birkenhead	England	St. Paul's Church	
11 March 1962	Liverpool	England	The Casbah Coffee Club	
12 March 1962	Southport	England	Kingsway Theater	
13 March 1962	Liverpool	England	The Cavern Club	
14 March 1962	Liverpool	England	The Cavern Club	
15 March 1962	Liverpool	England	Storyville Jazz Club	
16 March 1962	Liverpool	England	The Cavern Club	
17 March 1962	Liverpool	England	Village Hall	
18 March 1962	Liverpool	England	The Casbah Coffee Club	
19 March 1962	Southport	England	Kingsway Theater	
20 March 1962	Liverpool	England	The Cavern Club	
21 March 1962	Liverpool	England	The Cavern Club	
22 March 1962	Liverpool	England	The Cavern Club	
23 March 1962	Liverpool	England	The Cavern Club	
24 March 1962	Heswall	England	Heswall Jazz Club	
25 March 1962	Liverpool	England	The Casbah Coffee Club	
26 March 1962	Liverpool	England	The Cavern Club	
28 March 1962	Liverpool	England	The Cavern Club	
29 March 1962	Liverpool	England	Odd Spot Club	
30 March 1962	Liverpool	England	The Cavern Club	
31 March 1962	Stroud	England	Subscription Rooms	
1 April 1962	Liverpool	England	The Casbah Coffee Club	
2 April 1962	Liverpool	England	Pavilion Theater	
4 April 1962	Liverpool	England	The Cavern Club	
5 April 1962	Liverpool	England	The Cavern Club	
6 April 1962	New Brighton	England	Tower Ballroom	
7 April 1962	Liverpool	England	The Casbah Coffee Club	
8 April 1962	Liverpool	England	The Casbah Coffee Club	
13 April 1962	Hamburg	West Germany	Star-Club	
14 April 1962	Hamburg	West Germany	Star-Club	
15 April 1962	Hamburg	West Germany	Star-Club	
16 April 1962	Hamburg	West Germany	Star-Club	
17 April 1962	Hamburg	West Germany	Star-Club	
18 April 1962	Hamburg	West Germany	Star-Club	
19 April 1962	Hamburg	West Germany	Star-Club	
20 April 1962	Hamburg	West Germany	Star-Club	
21 April 1962	Hamburg	West Germany	Star-Club	
22 April 1962	Hamburg	West Germany	Star-Club	
23 April 1962	Hamburg	West Germany	Star-Club	
24 April 1962	Hamburg	West Germany	Star-Club	
25 April 1962	Hamburg	West Germany	Star-Club	
26 April 1962	Hamburg	West Germany	Star-Club	
27 April 1962	Hamburg	West Germany	Star-Club	
28 April 1962	Hamburg	West Germany	Star-Club	
29 April 1962	Hamburg	West Germany	Star-Club	
30 April 1962	Hamburg	West Germany	Star-Club	
1 May 1962	Hamburg	West Germany	Star-Club	
2 May 1962	Hamburg	West Germany	Star-Club	
3 May 1962	Hamburg	West Germany	Star-Club	
4 May 1962	Hamburg	West Germany	Star-Club	
5 May 1962	Hamburg	West Germany	Star-Club	
6 May 1962	Hamburg	West Germany	Star-Club	
7 May 1962	Hamburg	West Germany	Star-Club	
8 May 1962	Hamburg	West Germany	Star-Club	
9 May 1962	Hamburg	West Germany	Star-Club	
10 May 1962	Hamburg	West Germany	Star-Club	
11 May 1962	Hamburg	West Germany	Star-Club	
12 May 1962	Hamburg	West Germany	Star-Club	
13 May 1962	Hamburg	West Germany	Star-Club	
14 May 1962	Hamburg	West Germany	Star-Club	
15 May 1962	Hamburg	West Germany	Star-Club	
16 May 1962	Hamburg	West Germany	Star-Club	
17 May 1962	Hamburg	West Germany	Star-Club	
18 May 1962	Hamburg	West Germany	Star-Club	
19 May 1962	Hamburg	West Germany	Star-Club	
20 May 1962	Hamburg	West Germany	Star-Club	
21 May 1962	Hamburg	West Germany	Star-Club	
22 May 1962	Hamburg	West Germany	Star-Club	
23 May 1962	Hamburg	West Germany	Star-Club	
24 May 1962	Hamburg	West Germany	Star-Club	
25 May 1962	Hamburg	West Germany	Star-Club	
26 May 1962	Hamburg	West Germany	Star-Club	
27 May 1962	Hamburg	West Germany	Star-Club	
28 May 1962	Hamburg	West Germany	Star-Club	
29 May 1962	Hamburg	West Germany	Star-Club	
30 May 1962	Hamburg	West Germany	Star-Club	
31 May 1962	Hamburg	West Germany	Star-Club	
9 June 1962	Liverpool	England	The Cavern Club	
11 June 1962	Liverpool	England	The Cavern Club	
12 June 1962	Liverpool	England	The Cavern Club	
13 June 1962	Liverpool	England	The Cavern Club	
15 June 1962	Liverpool	England	The Cavern Club	
16 June 1962	Liverpool	England	The Cavern Club	
19 June 1962	Liverpool	England	The Cavern Club	
20 June 1962	Liverpool	England	The Cavern Club	
21 June 1962	New Brighton	England	Tower Ballroom	
22 June 1962	Liverpool	England	The Cavern Club	
23 June 1962	Northwich	England	Northwich Memorial Hall	
24 June 1962	Liverpool	England	The Casbah Coffee Club	
25 June 1962	St. Helens	England	Plaza Ballroom	
27 June 1962	Liverpool	England	The Cavern Club	
28 June 1962	Birkenhead	England	Majestic Ballroom	
29 June 1962	New Brighton	England	Tower Ballroom	
30 June 1962	Heswall	England	Heswall Jazz Club	
1 July 1962	Liverpool	England	The Cavern Club	
2 July 1962	St. Helens	England	Plaza Ballroom	
3 July 1962	Liverpool	England	The Cavern Club	
4 July 1962	Liverpool	England	The Cavern Club	
5 July 1962	Birkenhead	England	Majestic Ballroom	
6 July 1962	River Mersey	England	MV Royal Iris	
7 July 1962	Port Sunlight	England	Hulme Hall	
8 July 1962	Liverpool	England	The Cavern Club	
9 July 1962	St. Helens	England	Plaza Ballroom	
10 July 1962	Liverpool	England	The Cavern Club	
11 July 1962	Liverpool	England	The Cavern Club	
12 July 1962	Birkenhead	England	Majestic Ballroom	
13 July 1962	New Brighton	England	Tower Ballroom	
14 July 1962	Rhyl	Wales	Regent Dansette Ballroom	
15 July 1962	Liverpool	England	The Cavern Club	
16 July 1962	St. Helens	England	Plaza Ballroom	
17 July 1962	Swindon	England	McIlroys Ballroom	
18 July 1962	Liverpool	England	The Cavern Club	
19 July 1962	Birkenhead	England	Majestic Ballroom	
20 July 1962	Warrington	England	Bell Hall	
21 July 1962	New Brighton	England	Tower Ballroom	
22 July 1962	Liverpool	England	The Cavern Club	
23 July 1962	Southport	England	Kingsway Theater	
24 July 1962	Liverpool	England	The Cavern Club	
25 July 1962	Liverpool	England	Cabaret Club	
26 July 1962	Southport	England	Cambridge Hall	
27 July 1962	New Brighton	England	Tower Ballroom	
28 July 1962	Birkenhead	England	Majestic Ballroom	
30 July 1962	Bootle	England	St. John's Hall	
1 August 1962	Liverpool	England	The Cavern Club	
3 August 1962	Liverpool	England	Grafton Rooms	
4 August 1962	Bebington	England	Victoria Hall	
5 August 1962	Liverpool	England	The Cavern Club	
7 August 1962	Liverpool	England	The Cavern Club	
8 August 1962	Doncaster	England	Co-Op Ballroom	
9 August 1962	Liverpool	England	The Cavern Club	
10 August 1962	River Mersey	England	MV Royal Iris	
11 August 1962	Liverpool	England	Odd Spot Club	
12 August 1962	Liverpool	England	The Cavern Club	
13 August 1962	Crewe	England	Majestic Ballroom	
15 August 1962	Liverpool	England	The Cavern Club	Last performance with Pete Best
16 August 1962	Chester	England	Riverpark Ballroom	Temporary replacement on drums – Johnny Hutchinson
17 August 1962	New Brighton	England	Tower Ballroom	Temporary replacement on drums – Johnny Hutchinson
18 August 1962	Port Sunlight	England	Hulme Hall	Ringo Starr's first official performance as a Beatle following the dismissal of Pete Best
19 August 1962	Liverpool	England	The Cavern Club	
20 August 1962	Crewe	England	Majestic Ballroom	
22 August 1962	Liverpool	England	The Cavern Club	
23 August 1962	Chester	England	Riverpark Ballroom	
24 August 1962	Birkenhead	England	Majestic Ballroom	
25 August 1962	Fleetwood	England	Marine Hall	
26 August 1962	Liverpool	England	The Cavern Club	
27 August 1962	Liverpool	England	The Cavern Club	
28 August 1962	Liverpool	England	The Cavern Club	
29 August 1962	Morecambe	England	Floral Hall Ballroom	
30 August 1962	Chester	England	Riverpark Ballroom	
31 August 1962	Lydney	England	Lydney Town Hall	
1 September 1962	Stroud	England	Subscription Rooms	
2 September 1962	Liverpool	England	The Cavern Club	
3 September 1962	Widnes	England	Queen's Hall	
5 September 1962	Liverpool	England	The Cavern Club	
6 September 1962	Liverpool	England	Rialto Ballroom	
7 September 1962	Irby	England	Village Hall	
8 September 1962	Birkenhead	England	YMCA	
9 September 1962	Liverpool	England	The Cavern Club	
10 September 1962	Widnes	England	Queen's Hall	
12 September 1962	Liverpool	England	The Caven Club	
13 September 1962	Chester	England	Riverpark Ballroom	
14 September 1962	New Brighton	England	Tower Ballroom	
15 September 1962	Northwich	England	Northwich Memorial Hall	
16 September 1962	Liverpool	England	The Cavern Club	
17 September 1962	Widnes	England	Queen's Hall	
19 September 1962	Liverpool	England	The Cavern Club	
20 September 1962	Liverpool	England	The Cavern Club	
21 September 1962	New Brighton	England	Tower Ballroom	
22 September 1962	Birkenhead	England	Majestic Ballroom	
23 September 1962	Liverpool	England	The Cavern Club	
25 September 1962	Heswall	England	Heswall Jazz Club	
26 September 1962	Liverpool	England	The Cavern Club	
28 September 1962	Liverpool	England	The Royal Iris (Cruise)	
29 September 1962	Manchester	England	Oasis Club	
30 September 1962	Liverpool	England	The Cavern Club	
2 October 1962	Liverpool	England	The Cavern Club	
3 October 1962	Liverpool	England	The Cavern Club	
4 October 1962	Liverpool	England	The Cavern Club	
5 October 1962	Nuneaton	England	Co-operative Hall	
6 October 1962	Port Sunlight	England	Hulme Hall	
7 October 1962	Liverpool	England	The Cavern Club	
10 October 1962	Liverpool	England	The Cavern Club	
11 October 1962	Liverpool	England	Rialto Ballroom	
12 October 1962	New Brighton	England	Tower Ballroom	
13 October 1962	Liverpool	England	The Cavern Club	
15 October 1962	Birkenhead	England	Majestic Ballroom	
16 October 1962	Runcorn	England	La Scala Ballroom	
17 October 1962	Liverpool	England	The Cavern Club	
19 October 1962	Liverpool	England	The Cavern Club	
20 October 1962	Hull	England	Majestic Ballroom	
21 October 1962	Liverpool	England	The Cavern Club	
22 October 1962	Widnes	England	Queen's Hall	
26 October 1962	Preston	England	Preston Public Hall	
27 October 1962	Port Sunlight	England	Hulme Hall	
28 October 1962	Liverpool	England	Empire Theater	
1 November 1962	Hamburg	West Germany	Star-Club	
2 November 1962	Hamburg	West Germany	Star-Club	
3 November 1962	Hamburg	West Germany	Star-Club	
4 November 1962	Hamburg	West Germany	Star-Club	
5 November 1962	Hamburg	West Germany	Star-Club	
6 November 1962	Hamburg	West Germany	Star-Club	
7 November 1962	Hamburg	West Germany	Star-Club	
8 November 1962	Hamburg	West Germany	Star-Club	
9 November 1962	Hamburg	West Germany	Star-Club	
10 November 1962	Hamburg	West Germany	Star-Club	
11 November 1962	Hamburg	West Germany	Star-Club	
12 November 1962	Hamburg	West Germany	Star-Club	
13 November 1962	Hamburg	West Germany	Star-Club	
14 November 1962	Hamburg	West Germany	Star-Club	
17 November 1962	Coventry	England	Matrix Hall	
18 November 1962	Liverpool	England	The Cavern Club	
19 November 1962	Smethwick	England	Smethwick Baths Ballroom	
20 November 1962	Southport	England	Floral Hall	
21 November 1962	Liverpool	England	The Cavern Club	
22 November 1962	Birkenhead	England	Majestic Ballroom	
23 November 1962	New Brighton	England	Tower Ballroom	
24 November 1962	Prestatyn	Wales	Royal Lido Ballroom	
25 November 1962	Liverpool	England	The Cavern Club	
28 November 1962	Liverpool	England	527 Club	
29 November 1962	Birkenhead	England	Majestic Ballroom	
30 November 1962	Newton-le-Willows	England	Earlestown Town Hall	
1 December 1962	Northwich	England	Northwich Memorial Hall	
2 December 1962	Peterborough	England	Embassy Cinema	
5 December 1962	Liverpool	England	The Cavern Club	
6 December 1962	Southport	England	Club Django	
7 December 1962	New Brighton	England	Tower Ballroom	
8 December 1962	Manchester	England	Oasis Club	
9 December 1962	Liverpool	England	The Cavern Club	
10 December 1962	Liverpool	England	The Cavern Club	
11 December 1962	Runcorn	England	La Scala Ballroom	
12 December 1962	Liverpool	England	The Cavern Club	
13 December 1962	Bedford	England	Bedford Corn Exchange	
14 December 1962	Shrewsbury	England	Shrewsbury Music Hall	
15 December 1962	Birkenhead	England	Majestic Ballroom	
16 December 1962	Liverpool	England	The Cavern Club	
18 December 1962	Hamburg	West Germany	Star-Club	
19 December 1962	Hamburg	West Germany	Star-Club	
20 December 1962	Hamburg	West Germany	Star-Club	
21 December 1962	Hamburg	West Germany	Star-Club	
22 December 1962	Hamburg	West Germany	Star-Club	
23 December 1962	Hamburg	West Germany	Star-Club	
24 December 1962	Hamburg	West Germany	Star-Club	
25 December 1962	Hamburg	West Germany	Star-Club	
26 December 1962	Hamburg	West Germany	Star-Club	
27 December 1962	Hamburg	West Germany	Star-Club	
28 December 1962	Hamburg	West Germany	Star-Club	
29 December 1962	Hamburg	West Germany	Star-Club	
30 December 1962	Hamburg	West Germany	Star-Club	
31 December 1962	Hamburg	West Germany	Star-Club	

=== 1963 ===
Date	Town or city	Country	Venue
Winter 1963 Scotland Tour
3 January 1963	Elgin	Scotland	Two Red Shoes
4 January 1963	Dingwall	Scotland	Dingwall Town Hall
5 January 1963	Bridge of Allan	Scotland	Museum Hall
6 January 1963	Aberdeen	Scotland	Beach Ballroom
Winter 1963 UK Tour
10 January 1963	Liverpool	England	Grafton Rooms
11 January 1963	Liverpool	England	The Cavern Club
11 January 1963	Old Hill	England	Plaza Ballroom
12 January 1963	Chatham	England	Invicta Ballroom
14 January 1963	Ellesmere Port	England	Civic Hall
17 January 1963	Liverpool	England	The Cavern Club
17 January 1963	Birkenhead	England	Majestic Ballroom
18 January 1963	Morecambe	England	Floral Hall
19 January 1963	Whitchurch	England	Town Hall
20 January 1963	Liverpool	England	The Cavern Club
23 January 1963	Liverpool	England	The Cavern Club
24 January 1963	Mold	Wales	Assembly Hall
25 January 1963	Darwen	England	Co-Operative Hall
26 January 1963	Macclesfield	England	El Rio Club
26 January 1963	Stoke-on-Trent	England	King's Hall
27 January 1963	Manchester	England	Three Coins Club
28 January 1963	Newcastle upon Tyne	England	Majestic Ballroom
30 January 1963	Liverpool	England	The Cavern Club
31 January 1963	Birkenhead	England	Majestic Ballroom
1 February 1963	Tamworth	England	Assembly Rooms
1 February 1963	Sutton Coldfield	England	Maney Hall
2 February 1963	Bradford	England	Gaumont Theater
3 February 1963	Liverpool	England	The Cavern Club
4 February 1963	Liverpool	England	The Cavern Club
Winter 1963 Helen Shapiro Tour, Part 1 2–9 February 1963
Winter 1963 UK Tour
5 February 1963	Doncaster	England	Gaumont Theatre
6 February 1963	Bedford	England	Gaumont Theatre
7 February 1963	Wakefield	England	ABC Cinema
8 February 1963	Carlisle	England	Regal
9 February 1963	Sunderland	England	Empire Theatre
12 February 1963	Oldham	England	Astoria Ballroom
13 February 1963	Hull	England	Majestic Ballroom
14 February 1963	Liverpool	England	Locarno Ballroom
15 February 1963	Birmingham	England	Ritz
16 February 1963	Oxford	England	Carfax Assembly
18 February 1963	Widnes	England	Queen's Hall
19 February 1963	Liverpool	England	The Cavern Club
20 February 1963	Doncaster	England	Swimming Baths
21 February 1963	Birkenhead	England	Majestic Ballroom
22 February 1963	Manchester	England	Oasis Club
Winter 1963 Helen Shapiro Tour, Part 2 23 February – 3 March 1963
Winter 1963 UK Tour
23 February 1963	Mansfield	England	Granada
24 February 1963	Coventry	England	Coventry Theatre
26 February 1963	Taunton	England	Gaumont Theatre
27 February 1963	York	England	Rialto
28 February 1963	Shrewsbury	England	Granada
1 March 1963	Southport	England	Odeon
2 March 1963	Sheffield	England	Sheffield City Hall
3 March 1963	Hanley	England	Gaumont Theatre
4 March 1963	St. Helens	England	Plaza Ballroom
7 March 1963	Nottingham	England	Elizabethan Ballroom
8 March 1963	Harrogate	England	Royal Hall
Spring 1963 Tommy Roe / Chris Montez Tour
9 March 1963	East Ham	England	Granada Cinema
10 March 1963	Birmingham	England	Birmingham Hippodrome
12 March 1963	Bedford	England	Granada Cinema
13 March 1963	York	England	Rialto Theater
14 March 1963	Wolverhampton	England	Gaumont Theater
15 March 1963	Bristol	England	Colston Hall
16 March 1963	Sheffield	England	Sheffield City Hall
17 March 1963	Peterborough	England	Embassy Cinema
18 March 1963	Gloucester	England	Regal Cinema
19 March 1963	Cambridge	England	Regal Cinema
20 March 1963	Romford	England	ABC Cinemas
21 March 1963	Croydon	England	ABC Cinemas
22 March 1963	Doncaster	England	ABC Cinemas
23 March 1963	Newcastle upon Tyne	England	Newcastle City Hall
24 March 1963	Liverpool	England	Empire Theater
26 March 1963	Mansfield	England	Granada Theater
27 March 1963	Northampton	England	ABC Cinemas
28 March 1963	Exeter	England	ABC Cinemas
29 March 1963	London	England	Lewisham Odeon
30 March 1963	Portsmouth	England	Guildhall
31 March 1963	Leicester	England	De Montfort Hall
Spring 1963 UK Tour
2 April 1963	Sheffield	England	Azena Ballroom, Sheffield
4 April 1963	Stowe	England	Roxburgh Hall, Stowe School
6 April 1963	Buxton	England	Pavilion Gardens
7 April 1963	Portsmouth	England	The Ocean View Hotel
8 April 1963	Leyton	England	Leyton Baths
9 April 1963	London	England	Gaumont State Cinema
10 April 1963	Birkenhead	England	Majestic Ballroom
11 April 1963	Middleton	England	Co-Operative Hall
12 April 1963	Liverpool	England	The Cavern Club
15 April 1963	Tenbury Wells	England	Riverside Dancing Club
17 April 1963	Luton	England	Majestic Ballroom
18 April 1963	London	England	Royal Albert Hall
19 April 1963	Stoke-on-Trent	England	King's Hall
20 April 1963	Frodsham	England	Mersey View Pleasure Grounds
21 April 1963	London	England	Empire Pool
21 April 1963	London	England	Pigalle Club
23 April 1963	Southport	England	Floral Hall
24 April 1963	London	England	Majestic Ballroom
25 April 1963	Croydon	England	Fairfield Halls
26 April 1963	Shrewsbury	England	Shrewsbury Music Hall
27 April 1963	Northwich	England	Memorial Hall
11 May 1963	Nelson	England	Imperial Ballroom
14 May 1963	Sunderland	England	Rink Ballroom
15 May 1963	Chester	England	Royalty Theatre
17 May 1963	Norwich	England	Grosvenor Rooms
28 May 1963	Worcester		Gaumont Theater
Spring 1963 Roy Orbison/The Beatles Tour 18 May – 9 June 1963
Summer 1963 UK Tour
10 June 1963	Bath	England	Pavilion
12 June 1963	Liverpool	England	Grafton Rooms
13 June 1963	Stockport	England	Palace Theatre Club
13 June 1963	Manchester	England	Southern Sporting Club
14 June 1963	New Brighton	England	Tower Ballroom
15 June 1963	Salisbury	England	City Hall
16 June 1963	Romford	England	Odeon Cinema
21 June 1963	Guildford	England	Odeon Cinema
22 June 1963	Abergavenny	Wales	Abergavenny Town Hall
25 June 1963	Middlesbrough	England	Astoria Ballroom
26 June 1963	Newcastle upon Tyne	England	Majestic Ballroom
28 June 1963	Leeds	England	Queen's Hall
30 June 1963	Great Yarmouth	England	ABC Cinema
5 July 1963	Old Hill	England	Plaza Ballroom
6 July 1963	Northwich	England	Memorial Hall
7 July 1963	Blackpool	England	ABC Theatre
8 July 1963	Margate	England	Winter Gardens
9 July 1963	Margate	England	Winter Gardens
10 July 1963	Margate	England	Winter Gardens
11 July 1963	Margate	England	Winter Gardens
12 July 1963	Margate	England	Winter Gardens
13 July 1963	Margate	England	Winter Gardens
14 July 1963	Blackpool	England	ABC Theatre
19 July 1963	Rhyl	Wales	Ritz Ballroom
20 July 1963	Rhyl	Wales	Ritz Ballroom
21 July 1963	Blackpool	England	Queen's Theatre
22 July 1963	Weston-super-Mare	England	Odeon Theatre
23 July 1963	Weston-super-Mare	England	Odeon Theatre
24 July 1963	Weston-super-Mare	England	Odeon Theatre
25 July 1963	Weston-super-Mare	England	Odeon Theatre
26 July 1963	Weston-super-Mare	England	Odeon Theatre
27 July 1963	Weston-super-Mare	England	Odeon Theatre
28 July 1963	Great Yarmouth	England	ABC Cinema
31 July 1963	Nelson	England	Imperial Ballroom
2 August 1963	Liverpool	England	Grafton Rooms
3 August 1963	Liverpool	England	The Cavern Club
4 August 1963	Blackpool	England	Queen's Theatre
5 August 1963	Urmston	England	Abbotsfield Park
6 August 1963	St Helier	Jersey	The Springfield Ballroom
7 August 1963	St Helier	Jersey	The Springfield Ballroom
8 August 1963	Saint Peter Port	Guernsey	Candie Gardens
9 August 1963	St Helier	Jersey	The Springfield Ballroom
10 August 1963	St Helier	Jersey	The Springfield Ballroom
11 August 1963	Blackpool	England	ABC Theatre
12 August 1963	Llandudno	Wales	Odeon Cinema
13 August 1963	Llandudno	Wales	Odeon Cinema
14 August 1963	Llandudno	Wales	Odeon Cinema
15 August 1963	Llandudno	Wales	Odeon Cinema
16 August 1963	Llandudno	Wales	Odeon Cinema
17 August 1963	Llandudno	Wales	Odeon Cinema
18 August 1963	Torquay	England	Princess Theatre
19 August 1963	Bournemouth	England	Gaumont
20 August 1963	Bournemouth	England	Gaumont
21 August 1963	Bournemouth	England	Gaumont
22 August 1963	Bournemouth	England	Gaumont
23 August 1963	Bournemouth	England	Gaumont
24 August 1963	Bournemouth	England	Gaumont
25 August 1963	Blackpool	England	ABC Theatre
26 August 1963	Southport	England	Odeon Cinema
27 August 1963	Southport	England	Odeon Cinema
28 August 1963	Southport	England	Odeon Cinema
29 August 1963	Southport	England	Odeon Cinema
30 August 1963	Southport	England	Odeon Cinema
31 August 1963	Southport	England	Odeon Cinema
4 September 1963	Worcester	England	Gaumont
5 September 1963	Taunton	England	Gaumont
6 September 1963	Luton	England	Odeon Cinema
7 September 1963	Croydon	England	Fairfield Halls
8 September 1963	Blackpool	England	ABC Theatre
13 September 1963	Preston	England	Public Hall
14 September 1963	Northwich	England	Memorial Hall
15 September 1963	London	England	Royal Albert Hall
Autumn 1963 Scotland Mini-Tour
5 October 1963	Glasgow	Scotland	Odeon
6 October 1963	Kirkcaldy	Scotland	Carlton
7 October 1963	Dundee	Scotland	Caird Hall
Autumn 1963 UK Tour
11 October 1963	Trentham	England	Trentham Gardens
13 October 1963	London	England	London Palladium
15 October 1963	Southport	England	Floral Hall
19 October 1963	Buxton	England	Pavilion Gardens Ballroom
Autumn 1963 Sweden Tour
25 October 1963	Karlstad	Sweden	Sundsta-aulan
26 October 1963	Stockholm	Sweden	Kungliga tennishallen
27 October 1963	Gothenburg	Sweden	Cirkus
28 October 1963	Borås	Sweden	Boråshallen
29 October 1963	Eskilstuna	Sweden	Sporthallen
Autumn 1963 UK Tour continued
1 November 1963	Cheltenham	England	Odeon
2 November 1963	Sheffield	England	Sheffield City Hall
3 November 1963	Leeds	England	Odeon
4 November 1963	London	England	Royal Variety Performance, Prince of Wales Theatre
5 November 1963	Slough	England	Adelphi
6 November 1963	Northampton	England	ABC Cinemas – Northampton
7 November 1963	Dublin	Ireland	Adelphi
8 November 1963	Belfast	Northern Ireland	Ritz
9 November 1963	East Ham	England	Granada
10 November 1963	Birmingham	England	Hippodrome
13 November 1963	Plymouth	England	ABC Cinemas
14 November 1963	Exeter	England	ABC Cinemas
15 November 1963	Bristol	England	Colston Hall
16 November 1963	Bournemouth	England	Bournemouth Winter Gardens
17 November 1963	Coventry	England	Coventry Theatre
19 November 1963	Wolverhampton	England	Gaumont
20 November 1963	Manchester	England	Manchester Apollo (ABC Cinema in 1963)
21 November 1963	Carlisle	England	ABC Cinemas
22 November 1963	Stockton-on-Tees	England	Globe
23 November 1963	Newcastle upon Tyne	England	Newcastle City Hall
24 November 1963	Hull	England	ABC Cinemas
26 November 1963	Cambridge	England	Regal
27 November 1963	York	England	Rialto
28 November 1963	Lincoln	England	ABC Cinemas
29 November 1963	Huddersfield	England	ABC Cinemas
30 November 1963	Sunderland	England	Empire
1 December 1963	Leicester	England	De Montfort Hall
2 December 1963	London	England	Grosvenor House Hotel
3 December 1963	Portsmouth	England	Guildhall
7 December 1963	Liverpool	England	Empire Theatre
7 December 1963	Liverpool	England	Odeon
8 December 1963	Lewisham	England	Odeon
9 December 1963	Southend-on-Sea	England	Odeon
10 December 1963	Doncaster	England	Gaumont
11 December 1963	Scarborough	England	Futurist Theatre
12 December 1963	Nottingham	England	Odeon
13 December 1963	Southampton	England	Gaumont
14 December 1963	London	England	Wimbledon Palais
The Beatles 1963 Christmas Shows
21 December 1963	Bradford	England	Gaumont
22 December 1963	Liverpool	England	Empire Theatre
24 December 1963	London	England	Finsbury Park Astoria Theatre
26 December 1963	London	England	Finsbury Park Astoria Theatre
27 December 1963	London	England	Finsbury Park Astoria Theatre
28 December 1963	London	England	Finsbury Park Astoria Theatre
30 December 1963	London	England	Finsbury Park Astoria Theatre
31 December 1963	London	England	Finsbury Park Astoria Theatre

=== 1964 ===
Date	Town or city	Country	Venue	Notes
The Beatles 1963 Christmas Shows (continued)
1 January 1964	London	England	Finsbury Park Astoria Theatre	
2 January 1964	London	England	Finsbury Park Astoria Theatre	
3 January 1964	London	England	Finsbury Park Astoria Theatre	
4 January 1964	London	England	Finsbury Park Astoria Theatre	
6 January 1964	London	England	Finsbury Park Astoria Theatre	
7 January 1964	London	England	Finsbury Park Astoria Theatre	
8 January 1964	London	England	Finsbury Park Astoria Theatre	
9 January 1964	London	England	Finsbury Park Astoria Theatre	
10 January 1964	London	England	Finsbury Park Astoria Theatre	
11 January 1964	London	England	Finsbury Park Astoria Theatre	
Winter 1964 London Show
12 January 1964	London	England	Palladium	
Winter 1964 France Shows
15 January 1964	Versailles	France	Cinema Cyrano	The first concert of the Beatles in France was on 15 January 1964 at the Cinema Cyrano to an audience limited to 1367 people. Music producer Bruno Coquatrix wanted the Beatles to "test themselves" at the Cyrano, which occasionally turned into a performance hall, before beginning their residency at the Olympia Hall, where they performed one to two concerts per day.
16 January 1964	Paris	France	Olympia Hall	The first concert of the Beatles in France was on 15 January 1964 at the Cinema Cyrano to an audience limited to 1367 people. Music producer Bruno Coquatrix wanted the Beatles to "test themselves" at the Cyrano, which occasionally turned into a performance hall, before beginning their residency at the Olympia Hall, where they performed one to two concerts per day.
17 January 1964	Paris	France	Olympia Hall	The first concert of the Beatles in France was on 15 January 1964 at the Cinema Cyrano to an audience limited to 1367 people. Music producer Bruno Coquatrix wanted the Beatles to "test themselves" at the Cyrano, which occasionally turned into a performance hall, before beginning their residency at the Olympia Hall, where they performed one to two concerts per day.
18 January 1964	Paris	France	Olympia Hall	The first concert of the Beatles in France was on 15 January 1964 at the Cinema Cyrano to an audience limited to 1367 people. Music producer Bruno Coquatrix wanted the Beatles to "test themselves" at the Cyrano, which occasionally turned into a performance hall, before beginning their residency at the Olympia Hall, where they performed one to two concerts per day.
19 January 1964	Paris	France	Olympia Hall	The first concert of the Beatles in France was on 15 January 1964 at the Cinema Cyrano to an audience limited to 1367 people. Music producer Bruno Coquatrix wanted the Beatles to "test themselves" at the Cyrano, which occasionally turned into a performance hall, before beginning their residency at the Olympia Hall, where they performed one to two concerts per day.
20 January 1964	Paris	France	Olympia Hall	The first concert of the Beatles in France was on 15 January 1964 at the Cinema Cyrano to an audience limited to 1367 people. Music producer Bruno Coquatrix wanted the Beatles to "test themselves" at the Cyrano, which occasionally turned into a performance hall, before beginning their residency at the Olympia Hall, where they performed one to two concerts per day.
21 January 1964	Paris	France	Olympia Hall	The first concert of the Beatles in France was on 15 January 1964 at the Cinema Cyrano to an audience limited to 1367 people. Music producer Bruno Coquatrix wanted the Beatles to "test themselves" at the Cyrano, which occasionally turned into a performance hall, before beginning their residency at the Olympia Hall, where they performed one to two concerts per day.
22 January 1964	Paris	France	Olympia Hall	The first concert of the Beatles in France was on 15 January 1964 at the Cinema Cyrano to an audience limited to 1367 people. Music producer Bruno Coquatrix wanted the Beatles to "test themselves" at the Cyrano, which occasionally turned into a performance hall, before beginning their residency at the Olympia Hall, where they performed one to two concerts per day.
23 January 1964	Paris	France	Olympia Hall	The first concert of the Beatles in France was on 15 January 1964 at the Cinema Cyrano to an audience limited to 1367 people. Music producer Bruno Coquatrix wanted the Beatles to "test themselves" at the Cyrano, which occasionally turned into a performance hall, before beginning their residency at the Olympia Hall, where they performed one to two concerts per day.
24 January 1964	Paris	France	Olympia Hall	The first concert of the Beatles in France was on 15 January 1964 at the Cinema Cyrano to an audience limited to 1367 people. Music producer Bruno Coquatrix wanted the Beatles to "test themselves" at the Cyrano, which occasionally turned into a performance hall, before beginning their residency at the Olympia Hall, where they performed one to two concerts per day.
25 January 1964	Paris	France	Olympia Hall	The first concert of the Beatles in France was on 15 January 1964 at the Cinema Cyrano to an audience limited to 1367 people. Music producer Bruno Coquatrix wanted the Beatles to "test themselves" at the Cyrano, which occasionally turned into a performance hall, before beginning their residency at the Olympia Hall, where they performed one to two concerts per day.
26 January 1964	Paris	France	Olympia Hall	The first concert of the Beatles in France was on 15 January 1964 at the Cinema Cyrano to an audience limited to 1367 people. Music producer Bruno Coquatrix wanted the Beatles to "test themselves" at the Cyrano, which occasionally turned into a performance hall, before beginning their residency at the Olympia Hall, where they performed one to two concerts per day.
27 January 1964	Paris	France	Olympia Hall	The first concert of the Beatles in France was on 15 January 1964 at the Cinema Cyrano to an audience limited to 1367 people. Music producer Bruno Coquatrix wanted the Beatles to "test themselves" at the Cyrano, which occasionally turned into a performance hall, before beginning their residency at the Olympia Hall, where they performed one to two concerts per day.
29 January 1964	Paris	France	Olympia Hall	The first concert of the Beatles in France was on 15 January 1964 at the Cinema Cyrano to an audience limited to 1367 people. Music producer Bruno Coquatrix wanted the Beatles to "test themselves" at the Cyrano, which occasionally turned into a performance hall, before beginning their residency at the Olympia Hall, where they performed one to two concerts per day.
30 January 1964	Paris	France	Olympia Hall	The first concert of the Beatles in France was on 15 January 1964 at the Cinema Cyrano to an audience limited to 1367 people. Music producer Bruno Coquatrix wanted the Beatles to "test themselves" at the Cyrano, which occasionally turned into a performance hall, before beginning their residency at the Olympia Hall, where they performed one to two concerts per day.
31 January 1964	Paris	France	Olympia Hall	The first concert of the Beatles in France was on 15 January 1964 at the Cinema Cyrano to an audience limited to 1367 people. Music producer Bruno Coquatrix wanted the Beatles to "test themselves" at the Cyrano, which occasionally turned into a performance hall, before beginning their residency at the Olympia Hall, where they performed one to two concerts per day.
1 February 1964	Paris	France	Olympia Hall	The first concert of the Beatles in France was on 15 January 1964 at the Cinema Cyrano to an audience limited to 1367 people. Music producer Bruno Coquatrix wanted the Beatles to "test themselves" at the Cyrano, which occasionally turned into a performance hall, before beginning their residency at the Olympia Hall, where they performed one to two concerts per day.
2 February 1964	Paris	France	Olympia Hall	The first concert of the Beatles in France was on 15 January 1964 at the Cinema Cyrano to an audience limited to 1367 people. Music producer Bruno Coquatrix wanted the Beatles to "test themselves" at the Cyrano, which occasionally turned into a performance hall, before beginning their residency at the Olympia Hall, where they performed one to two concerts per day.
3 February 1964	Paris	France	Olympia Hall	The first concert of the Beatles in France was on 15 January 1964 at the Cinema Cyrano to an audience limited to 1367 people. Music producer Bruno Coquatrix wanted the Beatles to "test themselves" at the Cyrano, which occasionally turned into a performance hall, before beginning their residency at the Olympia Hall, where they performed one to two concerts per day.
4 February 1964	Paris	France	Olympia Hall	The first concert of the Beatles in France was on 15 January 1964 at the Cinema Cyrano to an audience limited to 1367 people. Music producer Bruno Coquatrix wanted the Beatles to "test themselves" at the Cyrano, which occasionally turned into a performance hall, before beginning their residency at the Olympia Hall, where they performed one to two concerts per day.
Winter 1964 US Tour	Paris	France	Olympia Hall	The first concert of the Beatles in France was on 15 January 1964 at the Cinema Cyrano to an audience limited to 1367 people. Music producer Bruno Coquatrix wanted the Beatles to "test themselves" at the Cyrano, which occasionally turned into a performance hall, before beginning their residency at the Olympia Hall, where they performed one to two concerts per day.
9 February 1964	New York	United States	The Ed Sullivan Show, CBS Studio 50	
11 February 1964	Washington, D.C.	United States	Washington Coliseum	
12 February 1964	New York	United States	Carnegie Hall	
16 February 1964	Miami	United States	The Ed Sullivan Show, Deauville Hotel	
Spring 1964 UK Tour
19 April 1964	London	England	Around The Beatles TV special, IBC Studios	
26 April 1964	London	England	Empire Pool	
29 April 1964	Edinburgh	Scotland	ABC Cinemas	
30 April 1964	Glasgow	Scotland	Odeon Cinemas	
31 May 1964	London	England	Prince of Wales Theatre	
Spring / Summer 1964 World Tour 4 June – 16 August 1964
Summer 1964 European Tour
4 June 1964	Copenhagen	Denmark	K.B. Hallen	Jimmie Nicol on drums; Ringo Starr absent due to tonsillitis.
5 June 1964	Hillegom	Netherlands	Treslong. TV appearance for VARA.	Jimmie Nicol on drums; Ringo Starr absent due to tonsillitis.
6 June 1964	Amsterdam	Netherlands	Roundtrip through the canals	Jimmie Nicol on drums; Ringo Starr absent due to tonsillitis.
6 June 1964	Blokker	Netherlands	Veilinghallen	Jimmie Nicol on drums; Ringo Starr absent due to tonsillitis.
Summer 1964 Asian Tour
10 June 1964	Kowloon	British Hong Kong	Princess Theatre	Jimmie Nicol on drums; Ringo Starr absent due to tonsillitis.
Summer 1964 Australasian Tour
12 June 1964	Adelaide	Australia	Centennial Hall	Jimmie Nicol on drums; Ringo Starr absent due to tonsillitis.
13 June 1964	Adelaide	Australia	Centennial Hall	Jimmie Nicol on drums; Ringo Starr absent due to tonsillitis.
15 June 1964	Melbourne	Australia	Festival Hall	Ringo Starr returns.
16 June 1964	Melbourne	Australia	Festival Hall	
17 June 1964	Melbourne	Australia	Festival Hall	
18 June 1964	Sydney	Australia	Sydney Stadium	
19 June 1964	Sydney	Australia	Sydney Stadium	
20 June 1964	Sydney	Australia	Sydney Stadium	
22 June 1964	Wellington	New Zealand	Wellington Town Hall	
23 June 1964	Wellington	New Zealand	Wellington Town Hall	
24 June 1964	Auckland	New Zealand	Auckland Town Hall	
25 June 1964	Auckland	New Zealand	Auckland Town Hall	
26 June 1964	Dunedin	New Zealand	Dunedin Town Hall	
27 June 1964	Christchurch	New Zealand	Majestic Theatre	
29 June 1964	Brisbane	Australia	Brisbane Festival Hall	
30 June 1964	Brisbane	Australia	Brisbane Festival Hall	
Summer 1964 UK Tour
12 July 1964	Brighton	England	Hippodrome Theatre	
19 July 1964	Blackpool	England	ABC Cinema	
23 July 1964	London	England	London Palladium	
26 July 1964	Blackpool	England	Blackpool Opera House	
28 July 1964	Stockholm	Sweden	Johanneshovs Isstadion	
29 July 1964	Stockholm	Sweden	Johanneshovs Isstadion	
2 August 1964	Bournemouth	England	Gaumont	
9 August 1964	Scarborough	England	Futurist Theatre	
16 August 1964	Blackpool	England	Blackpool Opera House	
Summer 1964 United States and Canada Tour
19 August 1964	Daly City	United States	Cow Palace	
20 August 1964 (two shows)	Las Vegas	United States	Convention Hall	
21 August 1964	Seattle	United States	Seattle Center Coliseum	
22 August 1964	Vancouver	Canada	Empire Stadium	
23 August 1964	Los Angeles	United States	Hollywood Bowl	
26 August 1964	Denver	United States	Red Rocks Amphitheatre	
27 August 1964	Cincinnati	United States	Cincinnati Gardens	
28 August 1964	New York	United States	Forest Hills Stadium	
29 August 1964	New York	United States	Forest Hills Stadium	
30 August 1964	Atlantic City	United States	Convention Hall	
2 September 1964	Philadelphia	United States	Convention Hall	
3 September 1964 (two shows)	Indianapolis	United States	Indiana State Fairgrounds Coliseum	
4 September 1964	Milwaukee	United States	Milwaukee Arena	
5 September 1964	Chicago	United States	International Amphitheatre	
6 September 1964 (two shows)	Detroit	United States	Olympia Stadium	
7 September 1964 (two shows)	Toronto	Canada	Maple Leaf Gardens	
8 September 1964 (two shows)	Montreal	Canada	Montreal Forum	
11 September 1964	Jacksonville	United States	Gator Bowl Stadium	
12 September 1964	Boston	United States	Boston Garden	
13 September 1964 (two shows)	Baltimore	United States	Baltimore Civic Center	
14 September 1964	Pittsburgh	United States	Civic Arena	
15 September 1964	Cleveland	United States	Public Auditorium	
16 September 1964	New Orleans	United States	City Park Stadium	
17 September 1964	Kansas City	United States	Municipal Stadium	
18 September 1964	Dallas	United States	Dallas Memorial Auditorium	
20 September 1964	New York	United States	Paramount Theater	
1964 Autumn UK Tour
9 October 1964	Bradford	England	Gaumont	
10 October 1964	Leicester	England	De Montfort Hall	
11 October 1964	Birmingham	England	Birmingham Odeon	
13 October 1964	Wigan	England	ABC Cinemas	
14 October 1964	Manchester	England	Manchester Apollo ABC Cinema in 1964	
15 October 1964	Stockton-on-Tees	England	Globe	
16 October 1964	Hull	England	ABC Cinemas	
19 October 1964	Edinburgh	Scotland	ABC Cinemas	
20 October 1964	Dundee	Scotland	Caird Hall	
21 October 1964	Glasgow	Scotland	Odeon	
22 October 1964	Leeds	England	Odeon	
23 October 1964	Kilburn	England	Gaumont State Cinema	
24 October 1964	Walthamstow	England	Granada	
25 October 1964	Brighton	England	Hippodrome	
28 October 1964	Exeter	England	ABC Cinemas	
29 October 1964	Plymouth	England	ABC Cinemas	
30 October 1964	Bournemouth	England	Gaumont	
31 October 1964	Ipswich	England	Gaumont	
1 November 1964	Finsbury Park	England	Astoria Theatre	
2 November 1964	Belfast	Northern Ireland	King's Hall	
4 November 1964	Luton	England	Ritz	
5 November 1964	Nottingham	England	Odeon	
6 November 1964	Southampton	England	Gaumont	
7 November 1964	Cardiff	Wales	Capitol Centre	
8 November 1964	Liverpool	England	Liverpool Empire Theatre	
9 November 1964	Sheffield	England	City Hall	
10 November 1964	Bristol	England	Colston Hall	
The Beatles 1964 Christmas Shows
24 December 1964	London	England	Hammersmith Odeon	
26 December 1964	London	England	Hammersmith Odeon	
28 December 1964	London	England	Hammersmith Odeon	
29 December 1964	London	England	Hammersmith Odeon	
30 December 1964	London	England	Hammersmith Odeon	
31 December 1964	London	England	Hammersmith Odeon	

=== 1965 ===
Date	Town or city	Country	Venue
The Beatles 1964 Christmas Shows (continued)
1 January 1965	London	England	Hammersmith Odeon
2 January 1965	London	England	Hammersmith Odeon
4 January 1965	London	England	Hammersmith Odeon
5 January 1965	London	England	Hammersmith Odeon
6 January 1965	London	England	Hammersmith Odeon
7 January 1965	London	England	Hammersmith Odeon
8 January 1965	London	England	Hammersmith Odeon
9 January 1965	London	England	Hammersmith Odeon
11 January 1965	London	England	Hammersmith Odeon
12 January 1965	London	England	Hammersmith Odeon
13 January 1965	London	England	Hammersmith Odeon
14 January 1965	London	England	Hammersmith Odeon
15 January 1965	London	England	Hammersmith Odeon
16 January 1965	London	England	Hammersmith Odeon
Spring 1965 Wembley Show
11 April 1965	London	England	Empire Pool
1965 European tour 20 June – 3 July 1965
20 June 1965 (two shows)	Paris	France	Palais des Sports
22 June 1965 (two shows)	Lyon	France	Palais d'Hiver
24 June 1965 (two shows)	Milan	Italy	Velodromo Vigorelli
26 June 1965 (two shows)	Genoa	Italy	Palasport di Genova
27 June 1965 (two shows)	Rome	Italy	Teatro Adriano
28 June 1965 (two shows)	Rome	Italy	Teatro Adriano
30 June 1965	Nice	France	Palais des Expositions
2 July 1965	Madrid	Spain	Plaza de Toros de Las Ventas
3 July 1965	Barcelona	Spain	La Monumental
Summer 1965 United Kingdom show
1 August 1965	Blackpool	England	ABC Theatre
1965 US tour 15–31 August 1965
15 August 1965	New York	United States	Shea Stadium
17 August 1965 (two shows)	Toronto	Canada	Maple Leaf Gardens
18 August 1965	Atlanta	United States	Atlanta Stadium
19 August 1965 (two shows)	Houston	United States	Sam Houston Coliseum
20 August 1965 (two shows)	Chicago	United States	Comiskey Park
21 August 1965	Bloomington (Minneapolis area)	United States	Metropolitan Stadium
22 August 1965 (two shows)	Portland	United States	Memorial Coliseum
28 August 1965	San Diego	United States	Balboa Stadium
29 August 1965	Los Angeles	United States	Hollywood Bowl
30 August 1965	Los Angeles	United States	Hollywood Bowl
31 August 1965 (two shows)	Daly City (San Francisco area)	United States	Cow Palace
1965 UK Tour
3 December 1965	Glasgow	Scotland	Odeon
4 December 1965	Newcastle	England	Newcastle City Hall
5 December 1965	Liverpool	England	Liverpool Empire Theatre
7 December 1965	Manchester	England	Manchester Apollo ABC Cinema in 1965
8 December 1965	Sheffield	England	The Gaumont
9 December 1965	Birmingham	England	Birmingham Odeon
10 December 1965	London	England	Hammersmith Odeon
11 December 1965	Finsbury Park	England	Astoria Theatre
12 December 1965	Cardiff	Wales	Capitol Theatre

=== 1966 ===
Date	Town or city	Country	Venue
Spring 1966 NME Poll-Winners Concert
1 May 1966	London	England	Empire Pool
Summer 1966 tour of Germany, Japan and the Philippines
24 June 1966 (two shows)	Munich	West Germany	Circus Krone Building
25 June 1966 (two shows)	Essen	West Germany	Grugahalle
26 June 1966 (two shows)	Hamburg	West Germany	Ernst Merck Halle
30 June 1966	Tokyo	Japan	Nippon Budokan
1 July 1966 (two shows)	Tokyo	Japan	Nippon Budokan
2 July 1966 (two shows)	Tokyo	Japan	Nippon Budokan
4 July 1966 (two shows)	Manila	Philippines	Rizal Memorial Football Stadium
Summer 1966 US tour 12–29 August 1966
12 August 1966 (two shows)	Chicago	United States	International Amphitheatre
13 August 1966 (two shows)	Detroit	United States	Olympia Stadium
14 August 1966	Cleveland	United States	Cleveland Stadium
15 August 1966	Washington, D.C.	United States	District of Columbia Stadium
16 August 1966	Philadelphia	United States	John F. Kennedy Stadium
17 August 1966 (two shows)	Toronto	Canada	Maple Leaf Gardens
18 August 1966	Boston	United States	Suffolk Downs Racetrack
19 August 1966 (two shows) (Note: The evening performance was originally cancelled, but went ahead after all.)	Memphis	United States	Mid-South Coliseum
21 August 1966 (Note: The Cincinnati show had been scheduled for 20 August but was postponed due to rain.)	Cincinnati	United States	Crosley Field
21 August 1966	St. Louis	United States	Civic Center Busch Memorial Stadium
23 August 1966	New York	United States	Shea Stadium
25 August 1966 (two shows)	Seattle	United States	Seattle Center Coliseum
28 August 1966	Los Angeles	United States	Dodger Stadium
29 August 1966	San Francisco	United States	Candlestick Park

=== 1969 ===
Date	Town or city	Country	Venue
30 January 1969	London	England	Apple Corps headquarters rooftop (with keyboardist Billy Preston)

== See also ==
- The Beat Ballad Show Tour, May 1960
- The Beatles' 1964 North American tour
- The Beatles' 1965 US tour
- The Beatles' 1966 US tour
- Outline of the Beatles
- The Beatles timeline
