= Liverpool Olympia =

Theatre in Liverpool, England

Coordinates: 53.4155°N 2.9577°W

- Interactive map of Liverpool Olympia
- Former names: Eventim Olympia (2018-); Locarno Ballroom (1948–64); Mecca Bingo Hall (1964–90)
- Address: W Derby Rd; Liverpool L6 9BY; England
- Owner: Argent Leisure
- Operator: Ghostwriter Consultancy and Events
- Capacity: 1,960

Construction
- Opened: 24 April 1905
- Architect: Frank Matcham

Listed Building – Grade II*
- Official name: Olympia Social Club
- Designated: 14 March 1975
- Reference no.: 1062584

Website
- Venue Website

The Liverpool Olympia (Known for sponsorship reasons as the Eventim Olympia) is a venue in Liverpool, England, situated on West Derby Road next to The Grafton Ballroom.

== History ==
The Liverpool Olympia was built in 1905 For Moss Empires Ltd by architect Frank Matcham as a purpose built indoor circus and variety theatre. The theatre was a response to the enormous success of Thomas Barrasford's Royal Hippodrome Theatre (4,000 capacity, built 1902, demolished 1984) which stood a very short distance away; the Olympia never managed to meet the success of the Hippodrome, and never managed a profit.

It is one of very few of its kind left in the country. Performing animals would appear in the auditorium by being lifted from the basement where they lived. Evidence of the lift mechanism and living areas for elephants and lions can still be found under the theatre. The roof space still holds pulley, and wheel mechanisms used by trapeze artists (including the famous Henderson family). The ornate interior still reflects the building's past with elephants, lions set into Indian wall Panelling.

The auditorium is one of the largest in Liverpool; in its heyday it could accommodate 3,750 people in the stalls and on 3 balconies. The unusual proscenium stage was at the same level as the stalls, with an orchestra riser against the back wall. The stage had a 15-metre (49 ft) wide Proscenium, was 12 metres (39 ft) deep, and had a height of 21 metres (69 ft).

The theatre was purchased by ABC theatre company, and converted into a Cinema in 1930. and was used up to the Second World War in 1939. Throughout the war, the Olympia was used as a Royal Naval Depot.

After the war, the Olympia did not re-open and was sold to Mecca Leisure Group in 1948. The Olympia was converted to a Ballroom, and was renamed the Locarno. The Locarno was then converted into a bingo hall between 1964 and 1982 before being closed and re-opening between 1987 and 1990.

== Today ==
The Olympia reopened in the 1990s, and after substantial renovations is currently used as a venue for all kinds of events including boxing, dance showcases, music concerts and more recently wrestling events (including Ring of Honor's 2006 and 2007 shows in the UK, TNA's 2008 UK tour and also 1PW's The New Divide show). The Olympia is owned by the same company as The Grafton Ballrooms next door.

The Olympia was designated by English Heritage as a Grade II* listed building in 1975.
