= Aintree Institute =

Former meeting hall and entertainment venue in Liverpool, England

Coordinates: 53.4646°N 2.9568°W

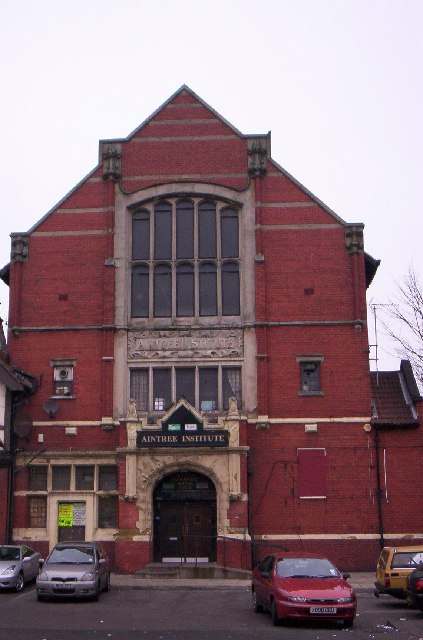
- The Institute in 2006
- Interactive map of Aintree Institute
- Location: Walton, Liverpool, England
- Type: Live music
- Events: Beat, Rock 'n' roll, Rock

The Aintree Institute was a live music venue in Walton, Liverpool, England. From the late 1950s, the venue was associated with Liverpool's growing Merseybeat scene.

== History ==
The institute was founded in the 1890s by Sir William Pickles Hartley. In an initial meeting in 1892, Hartley offered £1,000 (approximately £60,000 in 2005) towards a project that would see "all the Churches, from the Roman Catholic Church and the Church of England down to the very smallest mission room ... enter into a Christlike compact to fight against evil in every form." After the institute's establishment, the hall was used by the Aintree Photographic Society as a club house and exhibition venue.

During the Second World War, black people were prohibited from entering the hall. This was the result of a shooting and stabbing incident involving drunken black GIs.

In the early 1960s, promoter Bill Kelly (also of Lathom Hall) hosted concerts at the Institute billed as "sensational jive dances". The Beatles headlined a number of these evenings, billed as "The Dynamic Beatles" or the "Great Boppin' Beatles". The Beatles performed a total of 31 shows at the venue between 7 January 1961 and 27 January 1962. While at the club, it was common for some concertgoers to throw chairs at each other and at the band. The Beatles' final concert at the venue paid £15 (approximately £230 in 2005), but Brian Epstein was furious when Kelly paid the group in loose change. Epstein felt this was an insult to the band, and never booked the band with Kelly again.

The Aintree was demolished in 2007.
