= The Grafton Ballroom =

Entertainment venue in Liverpool, England

Coordinates: 53.41466°N 2.95834°W

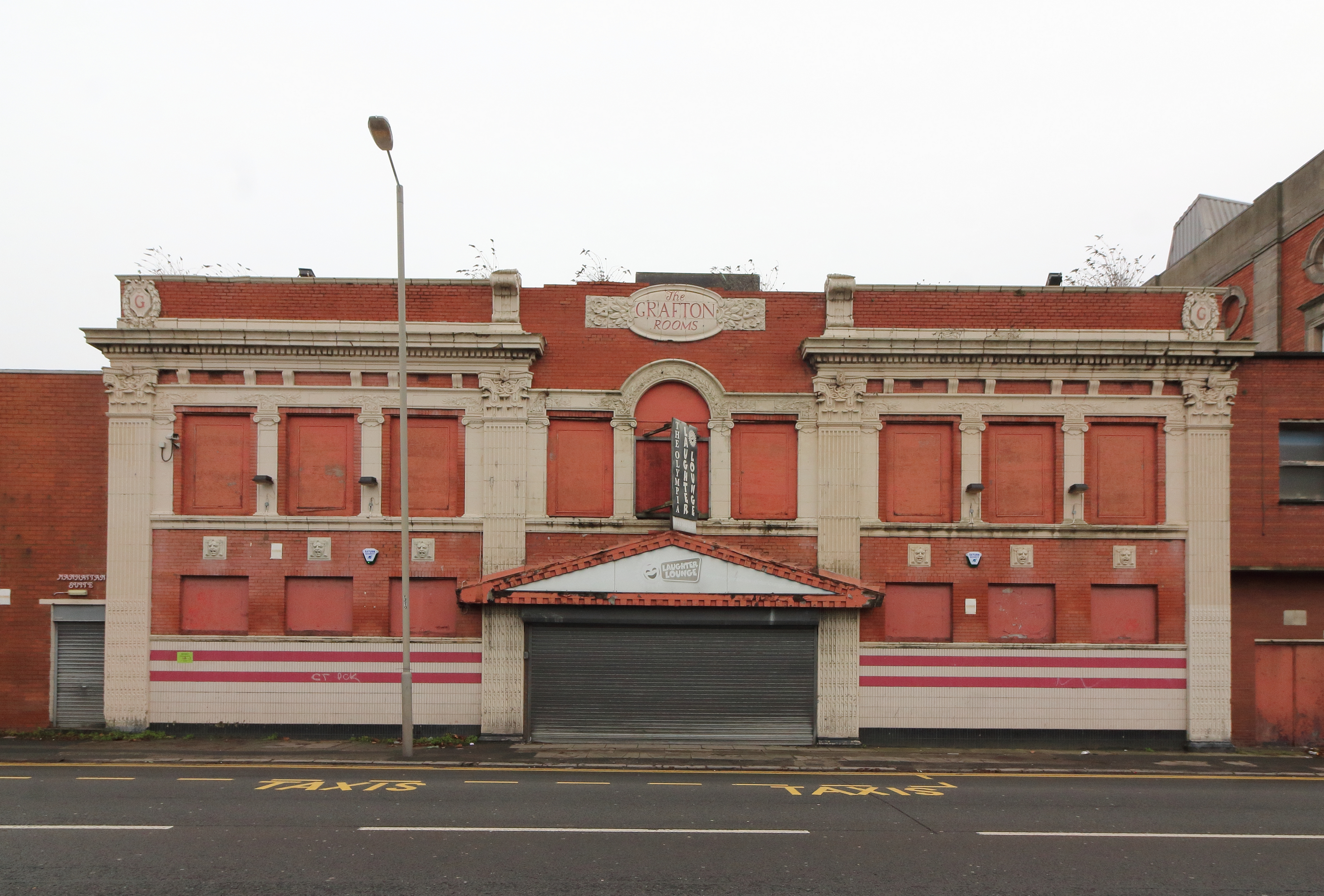
The Grafton Rooms, West Derby Road.

The Grafton Ballroom was an entertainment centre in Liverpool, England that opened on 9 February 1924. It was a purpose-built dance hall able to accommodate 1,200 dancers. It was built next to the Locarno Ballroom which is now known as the Liverpool Olympia. It has for several years been under the same ownership as the Olympia.

Joe Loss, Victor Silvester, Henry Hall, Duke Ellington, Anathema and The Beatles have all played The Grafton.

In September 2008, the Grafton closed as a dance venue. The building also briefly operated as a comedy club. On 27 January 2013, a section of the front facia of the building collapsed and fell into the street. It was made safe by Merseyside Fire and Rescue Service. There were no reports of injuries.

In March 2025, plans were greenlit for the demolition of the building to build 80 new modern apartments.The Edwardian Neoclassical frontage of the building is to be retained and incorporated. As of November 2025, demolition has started.
