= Subscription Rooms =

Public building in Stroud, Gloucestershire, England

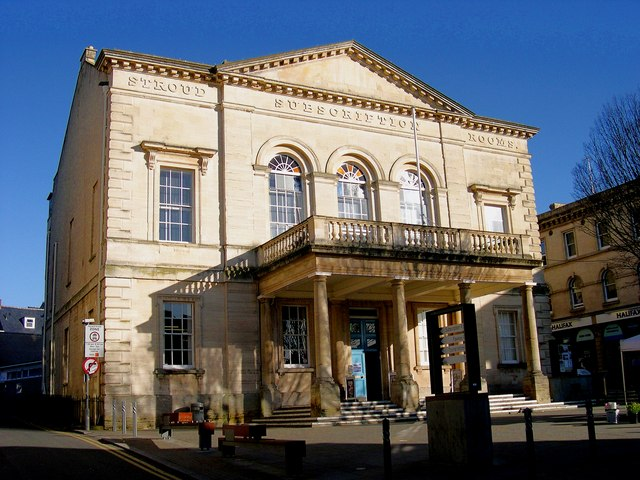
- Interactive map of the Subscription Rooms area

General information
- Location: George Street, Stroud, England
- Coordinates: 51.744949°N 2.217078°W
- Opened: 1833
- Owner: Stroud Subscription Rooms Trust

Technical details
- Material: Cotswold stone

Design and construction
- Architect: Charles Baker
- Designations: Grade II listed

Website
- www.thesubrooms.co.uk/home/

The Subscription Rooms is a building on George Street at the centre of the town of Stroud, Gloucestershire, England, erected in 1833 under the architect Charles Baker of Painswick. Funding for its erection was obtained through public subscription, hence its name.

The Rooms provide a venue for a variety of entertainment including music, dance, theatre, visual arts, spoken word, exhibitions and workshops. The Beatles performed there on 31 March 1962.

The building previously housed the Tourist Information Centre.

The two-storey, detached building is Grade II listed, giving it legal protection against unauthorised alteration or demolition. It is made from Cotswold stone, with a three-story extension to the rear, in brick. The frontage has a portico with Tuscan columns and balustraded balcony, facing onto a forecourt.

The building was owned by Stroud District Council, but in July 2017 they announced plans to sell it, by tender, with a guide price of £690,000 and with consideration given to letting. In 2019 it passed into the ownership of the Stroud Subscription Rooms Trust (Charity No. 1180350).
