= Northwich Memorial Hall =

Former theater in England

Northwich Memorial Hall was a theatre and concert venue in Northwich, Cheshire, England. The hall was built in 1960 to commemorate the victory in World War II. Notable artists that performed at the venue include The Beatles, The Who and Thin Lizzy. The hall closed in March 2013, and was demolished shortly after.

It was replaced by a new multi-purpose theatre, concert venue, gym and swimming pool in May 2015. Reflecting the building's history as the Memorial Hall and the demolished Magistrates Court adjacent to it, the new building was named Northwich Memorial Court. It's currently operated by Brio Leisure on behalf of Cheshire West and Chester Council.
