= Lathom Hall =

Music venue in Seaforth, Merseyside, England

Coordinates: 53°27′54″N 3°00′55″W

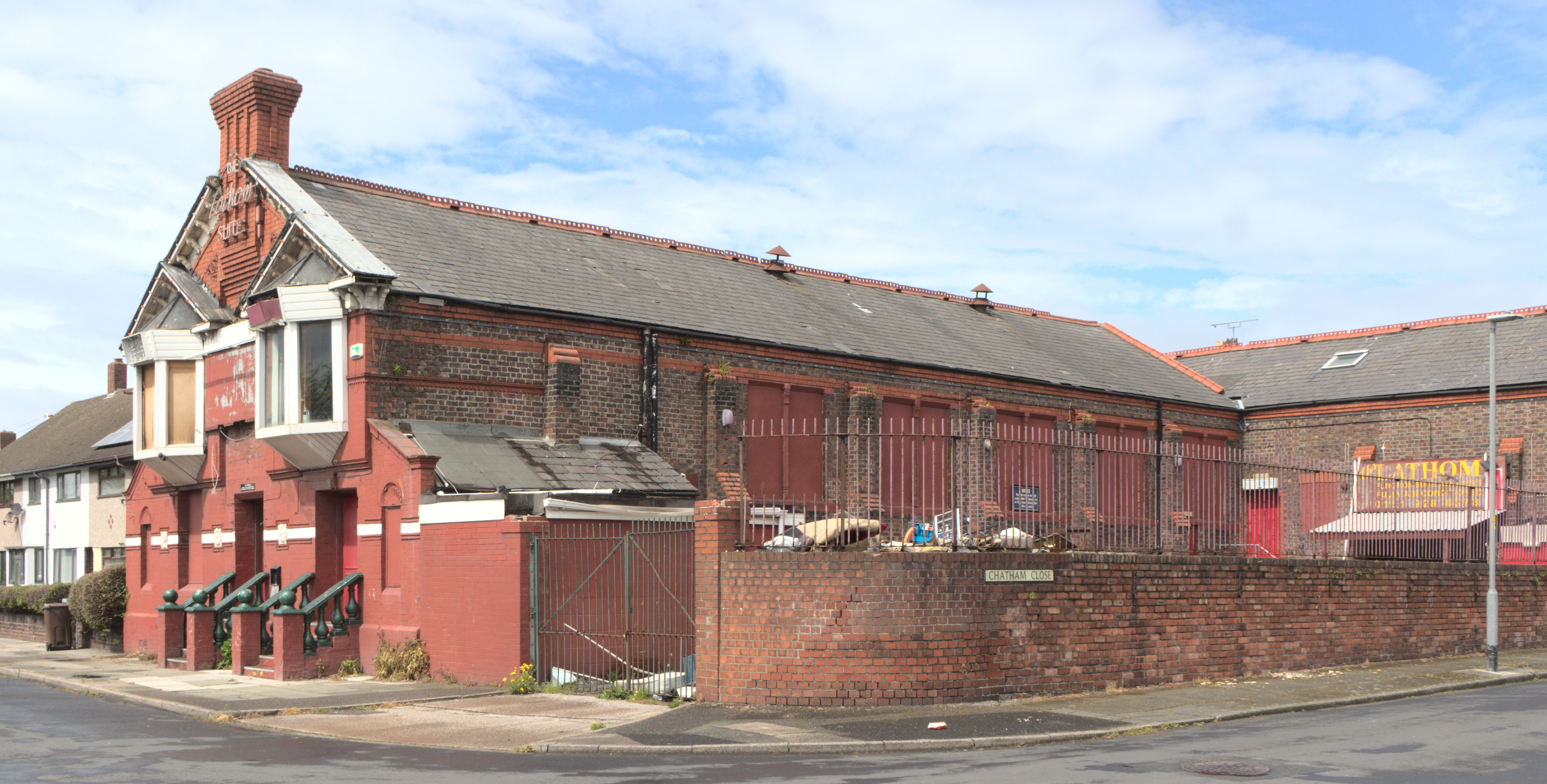

Lathom Hall is a former cinema and music venue in Seaforth, England. Built in 1884, the venue became synonymous with Merseybeat in the 1960s.

== Music venue ==
On 14 May 1960, the Silver Beatles auditioned at the hall during the interval of a performance by Cliff Roberts and the Rockers, Dick Dale and the Deltones, and King Size Taylor and the Dominoes. One report suggests that the venue's promoter, Brian Kelly, curtailed the group's set after just two songs as they performed so badly. Conversely, the Bootle Times reported that the group were "sensational". After the performances, a fight broke out backstage after bassist Stuart Sutcliffe was told to "cut [his] hair" as he looked like a girl. Despite this and their group's performance, Kelly booked the group for the following weekend's dance, promoting them as "Silver Beetles" in the headline slot. The group later failed to notify Kelly that they could not play at the performance, having received an offer to tour Scotland with Johnny Gentle, leaving him to explain to the audience why the advertised act would not appear.

Nevertheless, the group were booked for a number of subsequent concerts in early 1961, by which time they had changed their name to The Beatles. Kelly paid the group an average of £8 0s 10d per concert, equivalent to approximately £120 in 2005. The group's final appearance at the hall was on 25 February, George Harrison's 18th birthday.

Stuart Sutcliffe, who was the band's bassist at this time, would go on to die of a brain aneurysm 16 months later in Hamburg. A definitive cause is unknown, but it has been linked to the traumatic head injury he received during a fight outside Lathom Hall following one of the Beatles' performances in January 1961. According to former manager Allan Williams, Sutcliffe was either kicked in the head or thrown head first against a brick wall. Lennon and Best went to his aid fighting off his attackers before dragging him to safety. Sutcliffe had a fractured skull, and Lennon broke his little finger. Sutcliffe refused medical attention at the time and failed to keep an X-ray appointment at Sefton General Hospital.

== Legacy ==
After the popularity of Merseybeat subsided, the hall started to be used as a Royal Navy club before lying derelict for a number of years. In 1989, it was purchased by Brian Corrigan, who renovated the hall and reopened it as a bar and function venue decorated with Merseybeat memorabilia.
